= 1832 United States presidential election in Vermont =

- November 2 – December 5, 1832
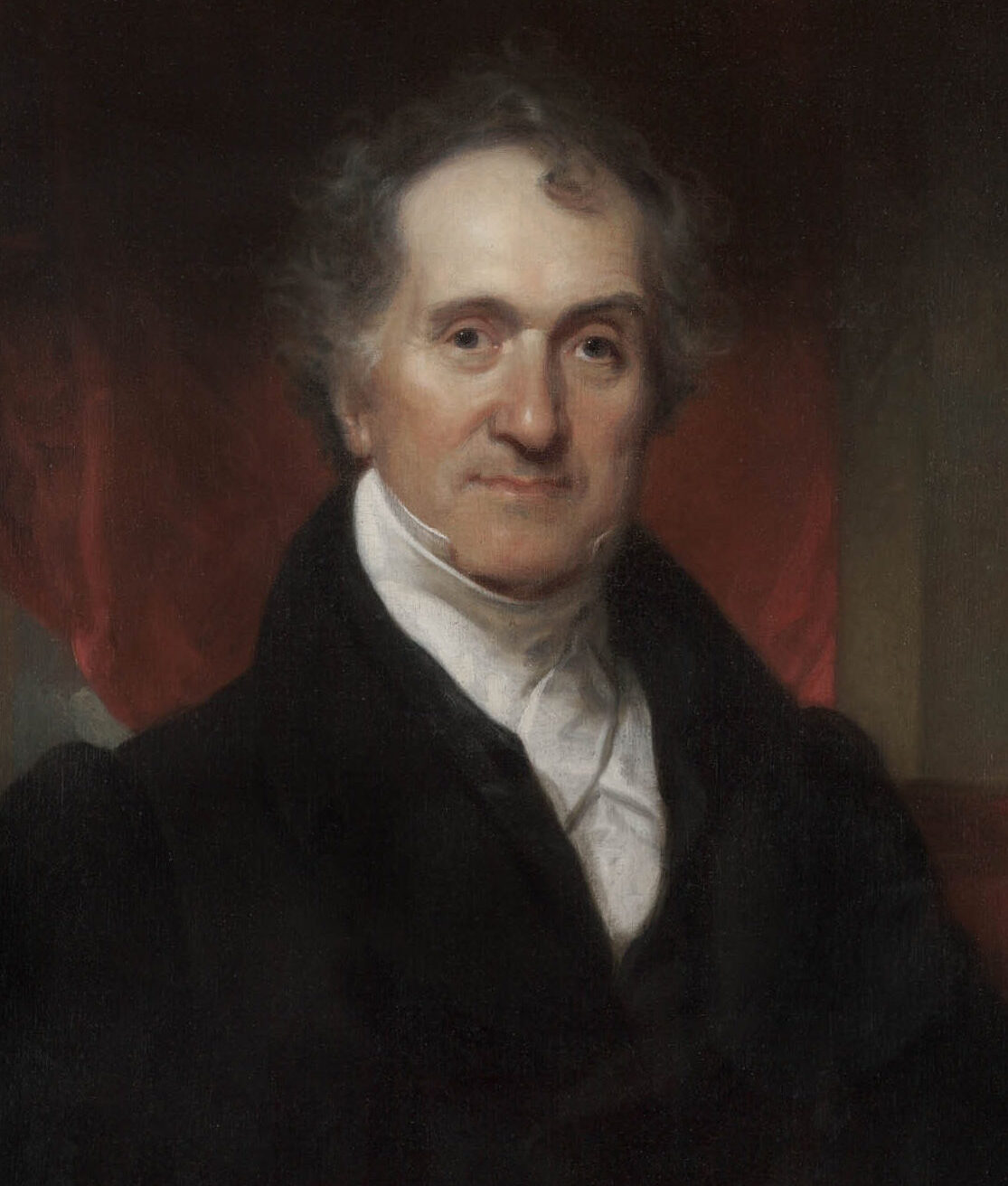

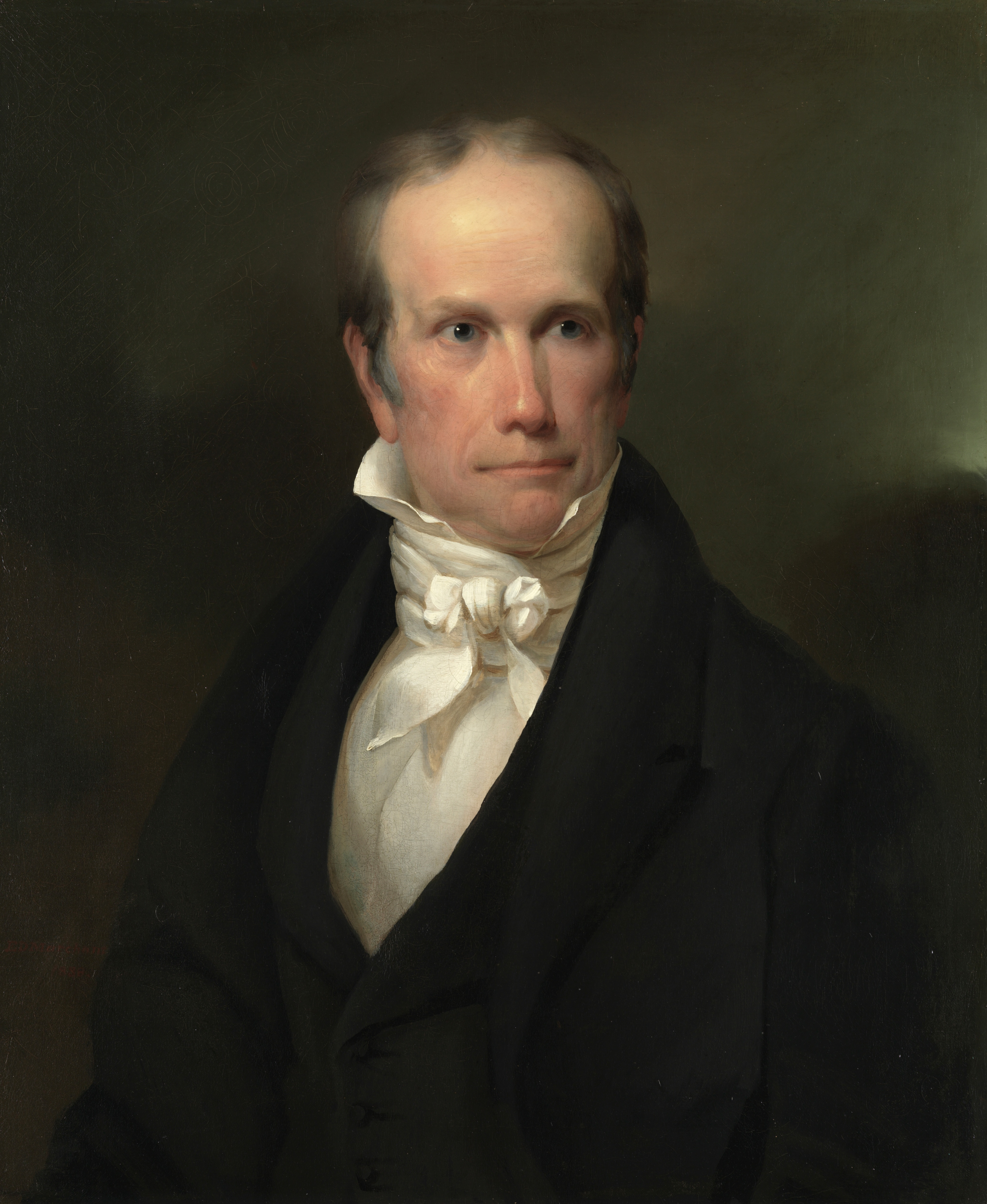

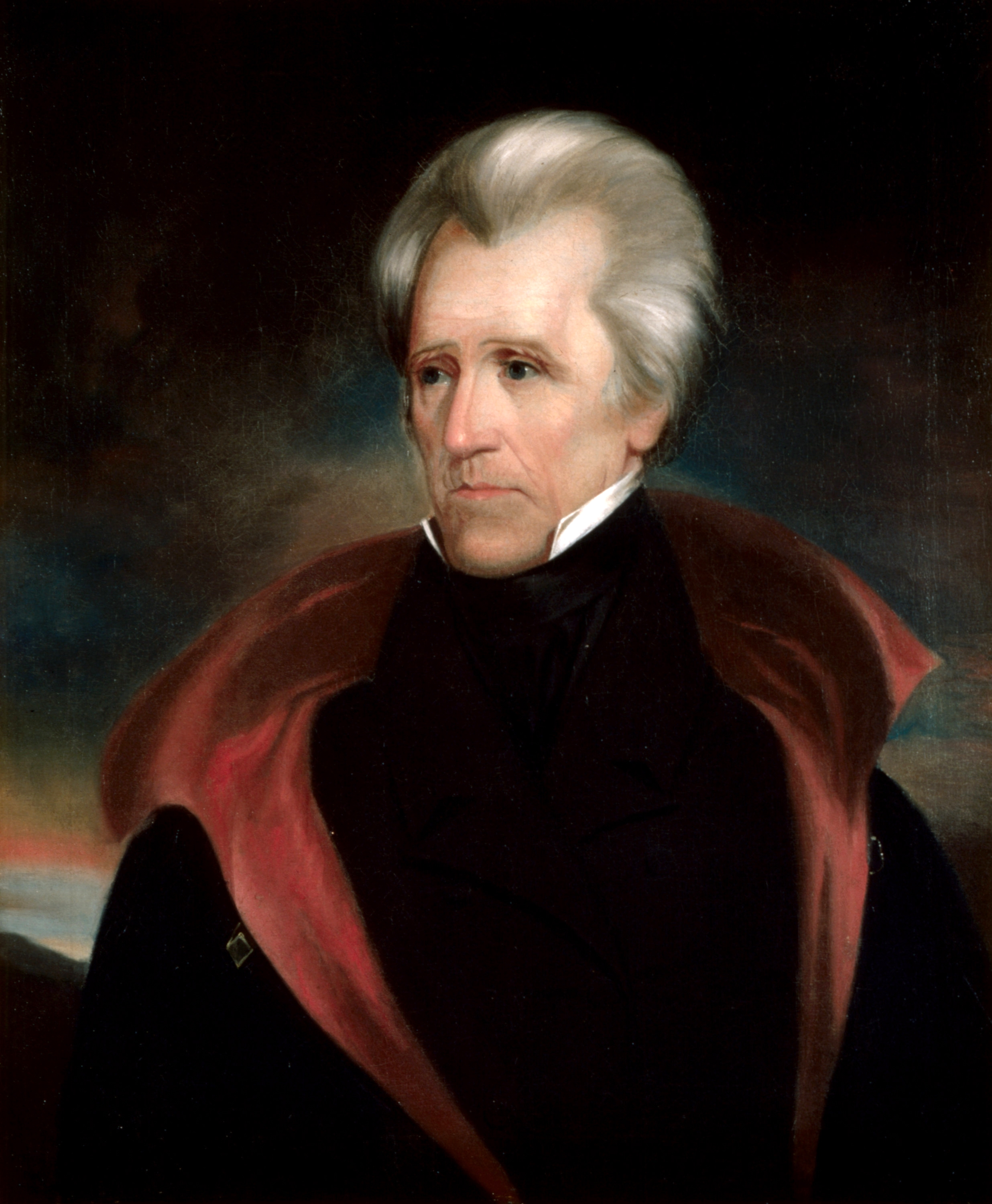
Nominee	William Wirt	Henry Clay	Andrew Jackson
Party	Anti-Masonic	National Republican	Democratic
Home state	Maryland	Kentucky	Tennessee
Running mate	Amos Ellmaker	John Sergeant	Martin Van Buren
Electoral vote	7	0	0
Popular vote	13,106	11,152	7,870
Percentage	40.79%	34.71%	24.50%
County results
Wirt
30–40%
40–50%
50–60%
70–80%
Clay
40–50%
50–60%
Jackson
40–50%
President before election
Andrew Jackson
Democratic
Elected President
Andrew Jackson
Democratic

The 1832 United States presidential election in Vermont took place between November 2 and December 5, 1832, as part of the 1832 United States presidential election. Voters chose seven representatives, or electors to the Electoral College, who voted for President and Vice President.

Vermont voted for the Anti-Masonic Party candidate, William Wirt, over the National Republican candidate, Henry Clay, and the Democratic Party candidate, Andrew Jackson. Vermont was the only state in the country that Wirt carried in 1832, by a margin of 6.08%. As of 2017, Wirt's performance remains the best-ever by a third-party presidential candidate in any Northeastern state, constitutes the solitary occasion a third-party candidate has carried any New England state, (Note: The only subsequent occasion a third-party candidate has carried any indisputably "Northeastern" state was when former President Theodore Roosevelt won Pennsylvania under the Progressive Party banner in 1912, although another ex-President, Millard Fillmore, carried border state Maryland (sometimes classified as Northeastern) in 1856 under the "Know Nothing" banner.) and the only time a person from Maryland (Note: Wirt was not on the ballot at all in his home state.) has ever won an electoral vote for the presidency from pledged electors. (Spiro Agnew of Maryland would in 1968 and 1972 win the electoral vote for the vice presidency.)

While Vermont was the only state that voted for Wirt, it would only prove to be his second strongest in terms of popular vote percentage, the first being Pennsylvania with 42.04 percentage points. In Pennsylvania, no ticket for Henry Clay was run, allowing Wirt to consolidate the Anti-Jackson vote.

== Results ==
1832 United States presidential election in Vermont
Party	Candidate	Votes	Percentage	Electoral votes
Anti-Masonic	William Wirt	13,106	40.79%	7
National Republican	Henry Clay	11,152	34.71%	0
Democratic	Andrew Jackson (incumbent)	7,870	24.50%	0
Totals		32,128	100.0%	7

== See also ==
- United States presidential elections in Vermont
