= 1832 United States presidential election in South Carolina =

- November 2 – December 5, 1832
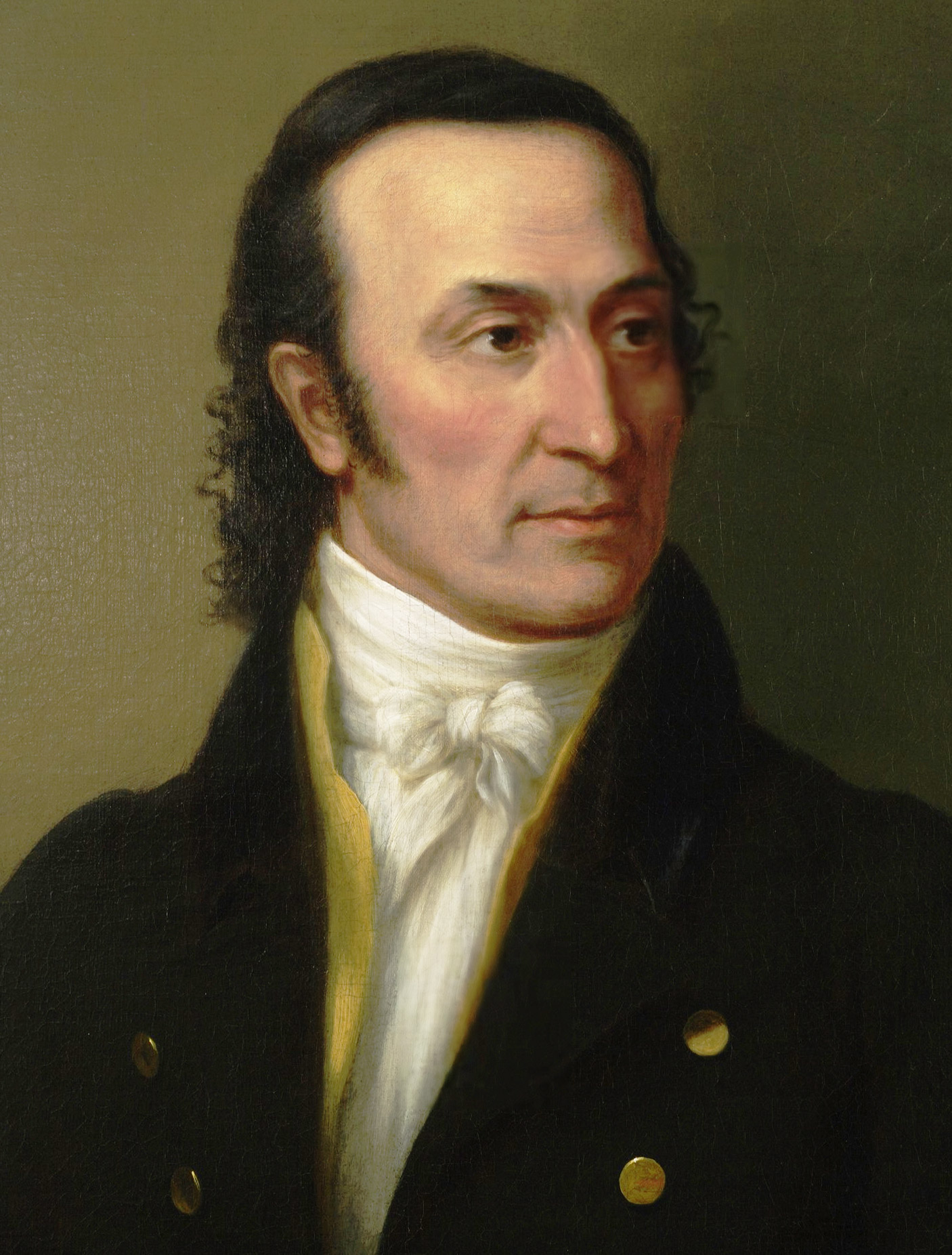
| Nominee | John Floyd |
| Party | Nullifier |
| Home state | Virginia |
| Running mate | Henry Lee |
| Electoral vote | 11 |
President before election
Andrew Jackson
Democratic
Elected President
Andrew Jackson
Democratic

The 1832 United States presidential election in South Carolina took place between November 2 and December 5, 1832, as part of the 1832 United States presidential election. The state legislature chose 11 representatives, or electors to the Electoral College, who voted for President and Vice President.

South Carolina cast 11 electoral votes for the Nullifier Party candidate, John Floyd. These electors were elected by the South Carolina General Assembly, the state legislature, rather than by popular vote. South Carolina and Kentucky were the only 2 states Jackson lost in 1832 that he had won the previous cycle.

== Results ==
1832 United States presidential election in South Carolina
| Party | Candidate | Votes | Percentage | Electoral votes |
|---|---|---|---|---|
| Nullifier | John Floyd | – | – | 11 |
| Totals | | – | – | 11 |

== See also ==
- United States presidential elections in South Carolina
