= 1832 United States presidential election in Maryland =

- November 2 – December 5, 1832
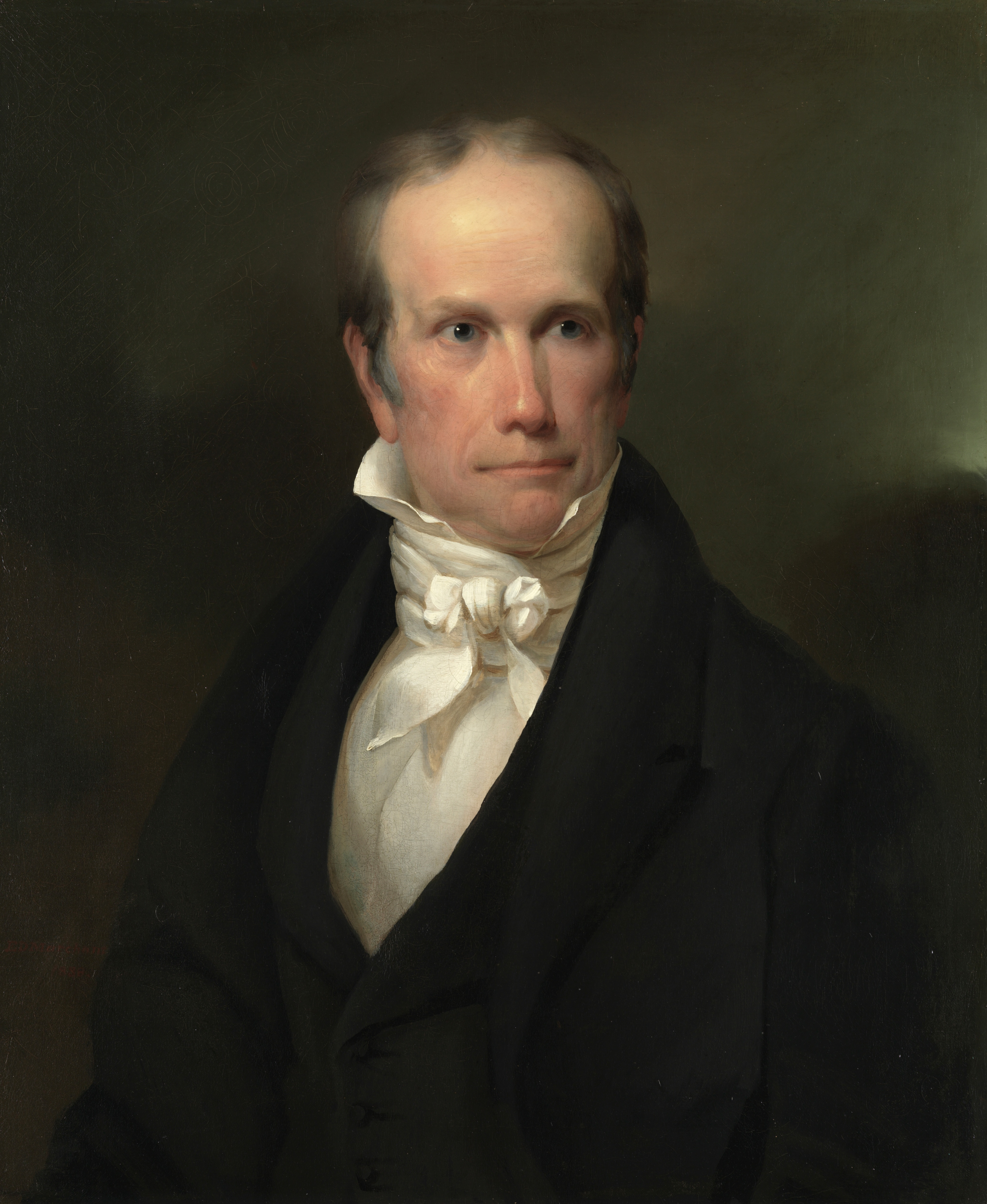

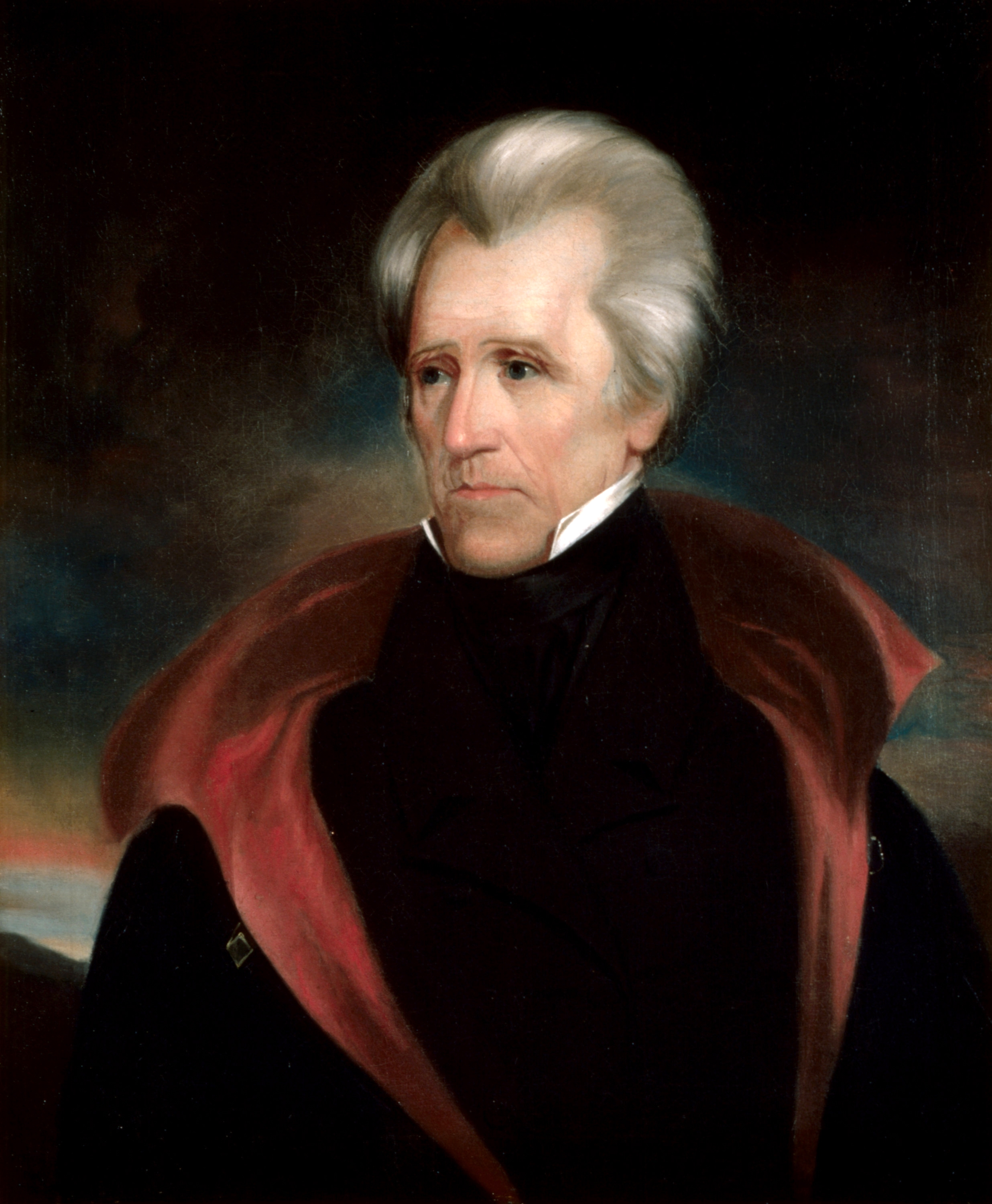
Nominee	Henry Clay	Andrew Jackson
Party	National Republican	Democratic
Home state	Kentucky	Tennessee
Running mate	John Sergeant	Martin Van Buren
Electoral vote	5 (Note: Two electors failed to cast their votes for Henry Clay. Otherwise, he would have had 7 electoral votes.)	3
Popular vote	19,160	19,156
Percentage	50.0052%	49.9948%
County results
Clay
50–60%
60–70%
70–80%
90–100%
Jackson
50–60%
60–70%
President before election
Andrew Jackson
Democratic
Elected President
Andrew Jackson
Democratic

The 1832 United States presidential election in Maryland took place between November 2 and December 5, 1832, as part of the 1832 United States presidential election. Voters chose 10 representatives, or electors to the Electoral College, who voted for President and Vice President.

While Maryland voted for the National Republican candidate, Henry Clay, over the Democratic Party candidate, Andrew Jackson, by a mere four votes, this is irrelevant because electors were not awarded based on the statewide vote. They were chosen in four district elections. A total of ten electoral votes were allocated, with five going to Clay and three to Jackson, while two electors failed to cast votes. In terms of raw votes cast, Clay's four-vote margin is the smallest between two major candidates in any state in any presidential election in United States history. This is the only time a Democrat won re-election without carrying the state's popular vote either time.

== Results ==
1832 United States presidential election in Maryland
Party	Candidate	Votes	Percentage	Electoral votes
National Republican	Henry Clay	19,160	50.0052%	5
Democratic	Andrew Jackson (incumbent)	19,156	49.9948%	3
Totals		38,316	100.0%	8

=== Results by electoral district ===
1832 United States presidential election in Maryland District 1 – Western (4 Electors) (Note: Allegany, Anne Arundel, Calvert, Charles, Frederick, Montgomery, Prince George's, St. Mary's, and Washington counties)
Party	Candidate	Votes	Percentage	Electoral votes
National Republican	Henry Clay	8,458	62.398%	4
Democratic	Andrew Jackson (incumbent)	5,097	37.602%	0
Totals		13,555	100.0%	4

1832 United States presidential election in Maryland District 2 – Baltimore City (2 Electors)
Party	Candidate	Votes	Percentage	Electoral votes
Democratic	Andrew Jackson (incumbent)	5,025	54.190%	2
National Republican	Henry Clay	4,248	45.810%	0
Totals		9,273	100.0%	2

1832 United States presidential election in Maryland District 3 – Baltimore County (1 Elector)
Party	Candidate	Votes	Percentage	Electoral votes
Democratic	Andrew Jackson and Martin Van Buren	2,198	75.663%	1
Democratic	Andrew Jackson and Philip P. Barbour	707	24.337%	0
National Republican	Henry Clay	0	0%	0
Totals		2,905	100.0%	1

1832 United States presidential election in Maryland District 4 – Eastern (3 Electors) (Note: Caroline, Cecil, Dorchester, Harford, Kent, Queen Anne's, Somerset, Talbot, Worcester counties)
Party	Candidate	Votes	Percentage	Electoral votes
National Republican	Henry Clay	6,454	51.291%	3
Democratic	Andrew Jackson (incumbent)	6,129	48.709%	0
Totals		12,583	100.0%	3

=== Results by county ===
County	Henry Clay National Republican		Andrew Jackson Democratic		Margin		Total votes cast
County	#	%	#	%	#	%	Total votes cast
Allegany	624	43.36%	815	56.64%	191	13.27%	1439
Anne Arundel	904	54.56%	753	45.44%	151	9.11%	1657
Baltimore (City and County)	4248	34.88%	7930	65.12%	−3682	−30.24%	12178
Calvert	401	60.21%	265	39.79%	136	20.42%	666
Caroline	556	53.98%	474	46.02%	82	7.96%	1030
Cecil	812	42.49%	1099	57.51%	−287	−15.02%	1911
Charles	515	56.04%	404	43.96%	111	12.08%	919
Dorchester	958	59.06%	664	40.94%	294	18.13%	1622
Frederick	2670	99.48%	14	0.52%	2656	98.96%	2684
Harford	893	44.08%	1133	55.92%	−240	−11.85%	2026
Kent	448	54.50%	374	45.50%	74	9.00%	896
Montgomery	718	79.16%	189	20.84%	529	58.32%	907
Prince George's	641	57.64%	471	42.36%	170	15.29%	1122
Queen Anne's	560	46.51%	644	53.49%	−84	−6.98%	1204
St. Mary's	621	70.89%	255	29.11%	366	41.78%	876
Somerset	719	60.47%	470	39.53%	249	20.94%	1189
Talbot	629	60.25%	415	39.75%	214	20.50%	1044
Washington	1364	41.40%	1931	58.60%	−567	−17.21%	3295
Worcester	879	50.66%	856	49.34%	23	1.33%	1735
Total	19160	50.01%	19156	49.99%	4	0.01%	38316

==== Counties that flipped from National Republican to Democratic ====
- Harford
- Queen Anne's

==== Counties that flipped from Democratic to National Republican ====
- Worcester

== See also ==
- United States presidential elections in Maryland
- 1832 United States presidential election
- 1832 United States elections
