= 1832 Democratic National Convention =

U.S. political event held in Baltimore, Maryland

- 1832 presidential election
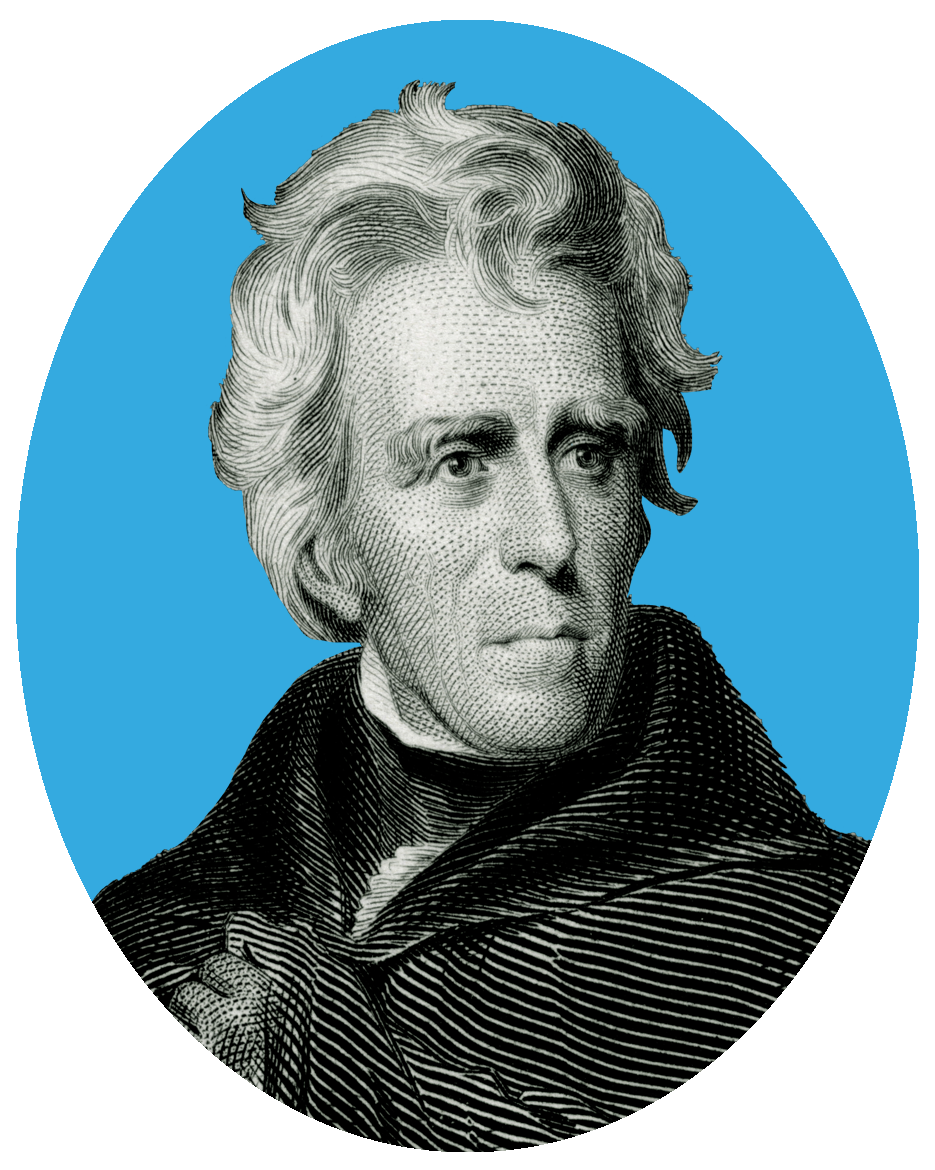
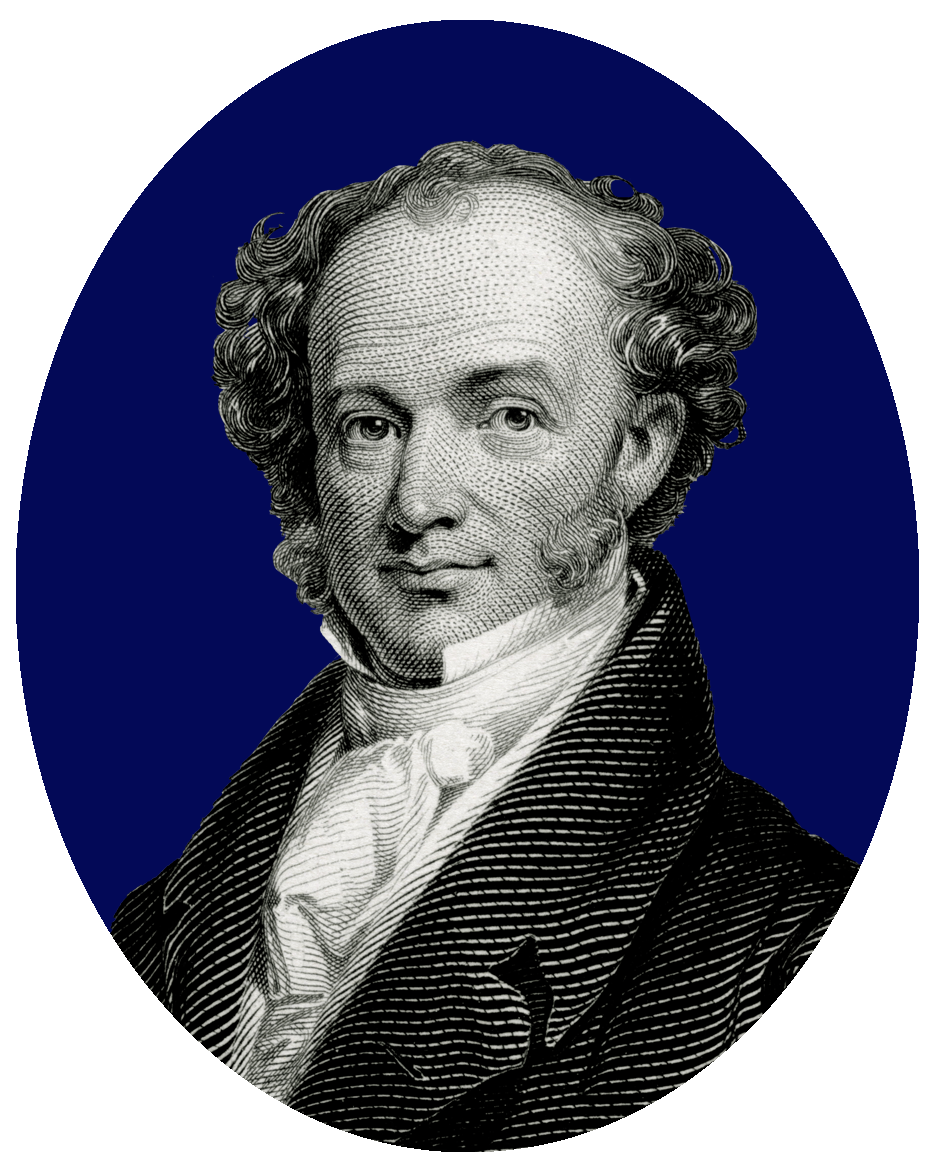
- Nominees; Jackson and Van Buren

Convention
- Date(s): May 21–23, 1832
- City: Baltimore, Maryland
- Venue: "The Athenaeum" (first), St. Paul and East Lexington Streets; Warfield's Church (First Universalist)

Candidates
- Presidential nominee: Andrew Jackson of Tennessee
- Vice-presidential nominee: Martin Van Buren of New York

Voting
- Total delegates: 283
- Results (president): Jackson (TN): 283 (100%)
- Results (vice president): Van Buren (NY): 208 (73.5%); Barbour (VA): 49 (17.3%); Johnson (KY): 26 (9.2%)

The 1832 Democratic National Convention was held from May 21 to May 23, 1832, in Baltimore, Maryland. In the first presidential nominating convention ever held by the Democratic Party, incumbent President Andrew Jackson was nominated for a second term, while former Secretary of State Martin Van Buren was nominated for vice president.

The Anti-Masonic Party and the National Republican Party had held the first presidential nominating conventions in 1831, and Jackson's "Kitchen Cabinet" helped organize a Democratic convention in 1832.

As the party leaders assumed that Jackson would be nominated for president, the primary purpose of the convention was to find a new running mate: Vice President John C. Calhoun had fallen out with Jackson following the Petticoat affair and the Nullification Crisis, and would subsequently resign the office in order to take a Senate seat.

The convention, which was presided over by Governor Robert Lucas, hosted delegates from every state except Missouri; Jackson won the presidential nomination unanimously.

With Jackson's strong endorsement, Van Buren easily won the vice presidential nomination on the first ballot, defeating former Representative Philip P. Barbour of Virginia and Representative Richard Mentor Johnson of Kentucky. The Democratic ticket of Jackson and Van Buren went on to win the 1832 presidential election.

== Background ==
In the summer of 1822, "Richmond Junto" leader Thomas Ritchie of Virginia began raising the idea of a national convention to resolve the issue of nomination; ultimately, the congressional nominating caucus was appealed to by the devotees of Treasury Secretary William H. Crawford's candidacy. Following that defeat in the election of 1824, early in 1827, Van Buren privately made the argument to Richie for an exclusive national convention of Republicans to ensure Jackson's nomination. However, it did not immediately come to fruition while state conventions and legislatures took up Jackson as their presidential candidate for the election of 1828 with Vice President John C. Calhoun as his running mate. Such a type of national convention would occur after the election.

Calhoun soon became politically estranged from President Jackson, due in part to an 1830 letter written by Crawford stating that Calhoun, as Secretary of War under President James Monroe, pushed for a reprimand of then-General Jackson for his actions in the 1818 invasion of Florida. The Petticoat affair in which Calhoun's wife, Floride, was a central figure further alienated Jackson from the vice president and his supporters. The final blow to the relationship came in January 1832, when Calhoun, as President of the Senate, sank Van Buren's nomination as Minister to Great Britain by casting a tie-breaking vote in the United States Senate. Consequently, Calhoun was replaced as the party's 1832 vice presidential nominee by Van Buren. Later that year, on December 28, he resigned as vice president, after having been elected to the U.S. Senate. There he continued to be a proponent of the doctrine of nullification in opposition to Jackson.

The proposal for the convention began with members of Jackson's "Kitchen Cabinet", his coterie of informal advisers and confidants. Major William Berkeley Lewis wrote on May 25, 1831, to Amos Kendall, who was then in New Hampshire. He proposed that the New Hampshire legislature call for a national gathering of Republican supporters of the Jackson administration to nominate a candidate for the vice presidency, and asked Kendall to pass the idea to Isaac Hill. After the New Hampshire legislature issued the call for a general convention, the Washington Globe, the principal Jacksonian newspaper, (Note: The Globe was established in 1830 in Washington, D.C., with Amos Kendall's influence, and was edited by Francis Preston Blair. It supplanted General Duff Green's United States Telegraph, which was associated with John Calhoun.) seconded the recommendation on July 6, 1831:

The recommendation of a Convention at Baltimore to nominate a candidate for the Vice-Presidency deserves a serious consideration. It is probably the best plan which can be adopted to produce entire unanimity in the Republican party, and secure its lasting ascendancy.

Lewis later recalled warning former Secretary of War and delegate John Eaton the day before the convention not to vote for anyone there except Van Buren unless he was prepared to "quarrel with the General [Jackson]."

== Proceedings ==
The convention was called to order by Frederick A. Sumner of New Hampshire, who said of the origins and purpose of the convention:

Gentlemen—The proposition for calling a general convention of delegates, to act on the nomination of a candidate for president, and to select a suitable candidate for vice-president of the United States, originated in the state of New Hampshire, by the friends of democracy in that state; and it appears that the proposition, although opposed by the enemies of the democratic party, has found favor in nearly and perhaps all the States of the Union ... The object of the representatives of the people of New Hampshire who called this convention was not to impose on the people as candidate for either of the two offices in this government, any local favorite; but to concentrate the opinion of all the states ... They believed that the example of this convention would operate favorably in future elections; that the people would be disposed after seeing the good effects of this convention in conciliating the different and distant sections of the country, to continue this mode of nomination.

Delegates from all states except Missouri were present. Governor Robert Lucas of Ohio served as the chairman and convention president. Peter Vivian Daniel, James Fenner, John M. Barclay, and Augustin Smith Clayton were chosen as convention vice presidents. John Adams Dix was appointed secretary at the first meeting, with other additional secretaries thereafter. A resolution was passed by the convention requiring two-thirds majority support of the delegates for a nomination.

An address by the Republican delegates of New York gave a history of previous national political activity in the United States. They denounced the National Republicans as Federalists under a new designation and they denounced the Nullifiers while they declared that their own party held the middle ground between the positions of the other two. The address described what they claimed were political similarities between Andrew Jackson and Thomas Jefferson and it defended the policies of Jackson's administration. It characterized Van Buren as a strict constructionist and welcomed his nomination.

The convention concluded by adopting a resolution calling for an address or report from the delegations to their constituents.

== Presidential nomination ==
Jackson was nominated via a resolution passed by the convention, affirming the nominations which Jackson had previously received from multiple state legislatures.

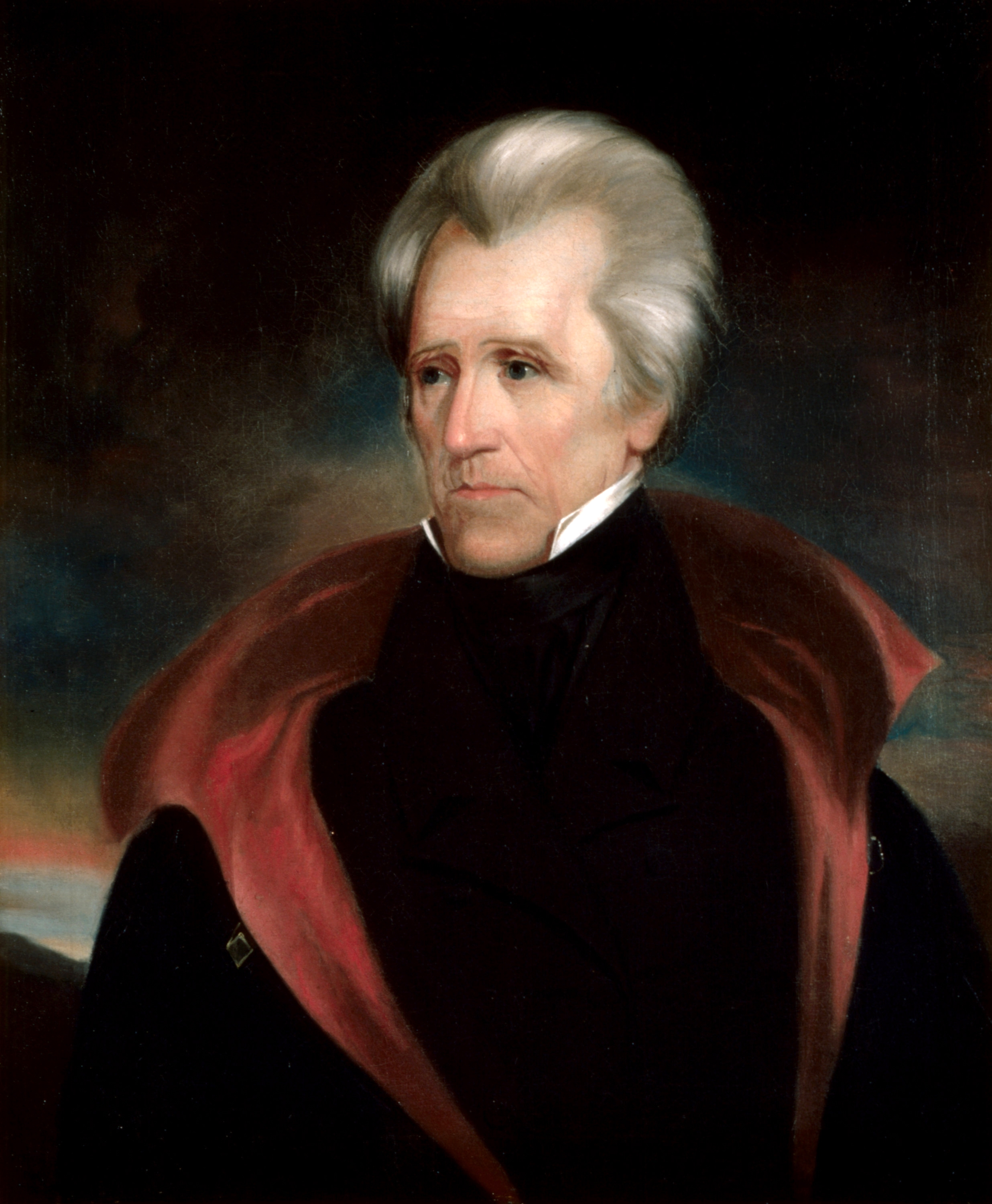
President
Andrew Jackson
of Tennessee

== Vice presidential nomination ==
=== Vice presidential candidates ===
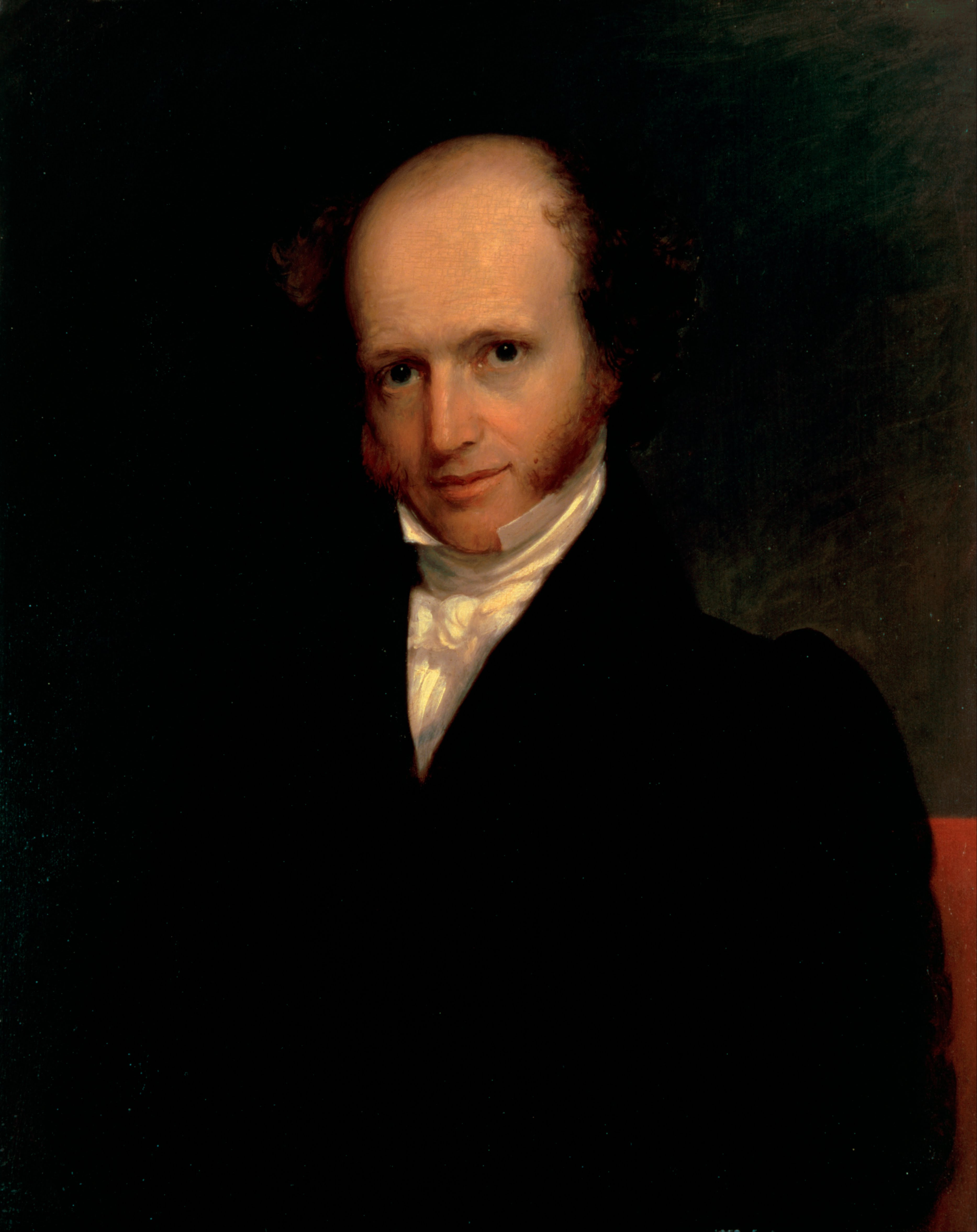
Former ambassador of the United States to the United Kingdom
Martin Van Buren
of New York

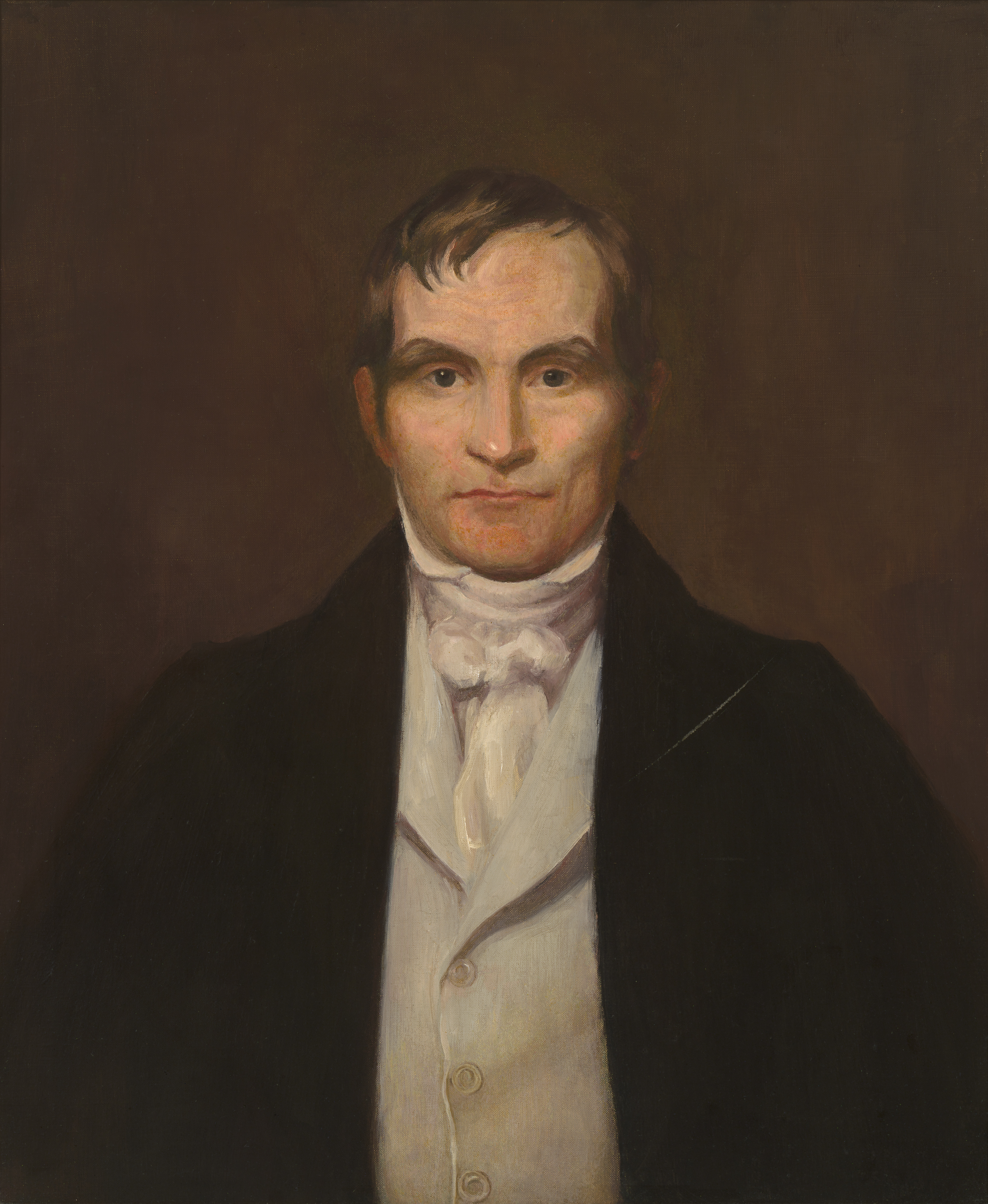
District Court Judge
Philip P. Barbour
of Virginia

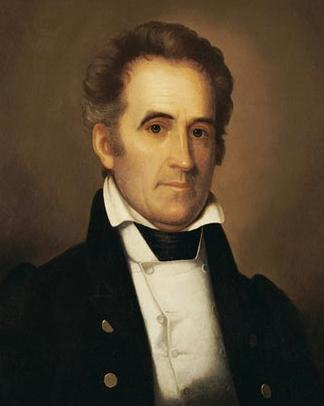
Representative
Richard M. Johnson
of Kentucky

Martin Van Buren was nominated for vice president on the first ballot after receiving 208 votes of the 283 cast, 19 more than the two-thirds majority required to win.

Vice Presidential Ballot
Candidate	1st
Van Buren	208
Barbour	49
Johnson	26
Not Represented	5

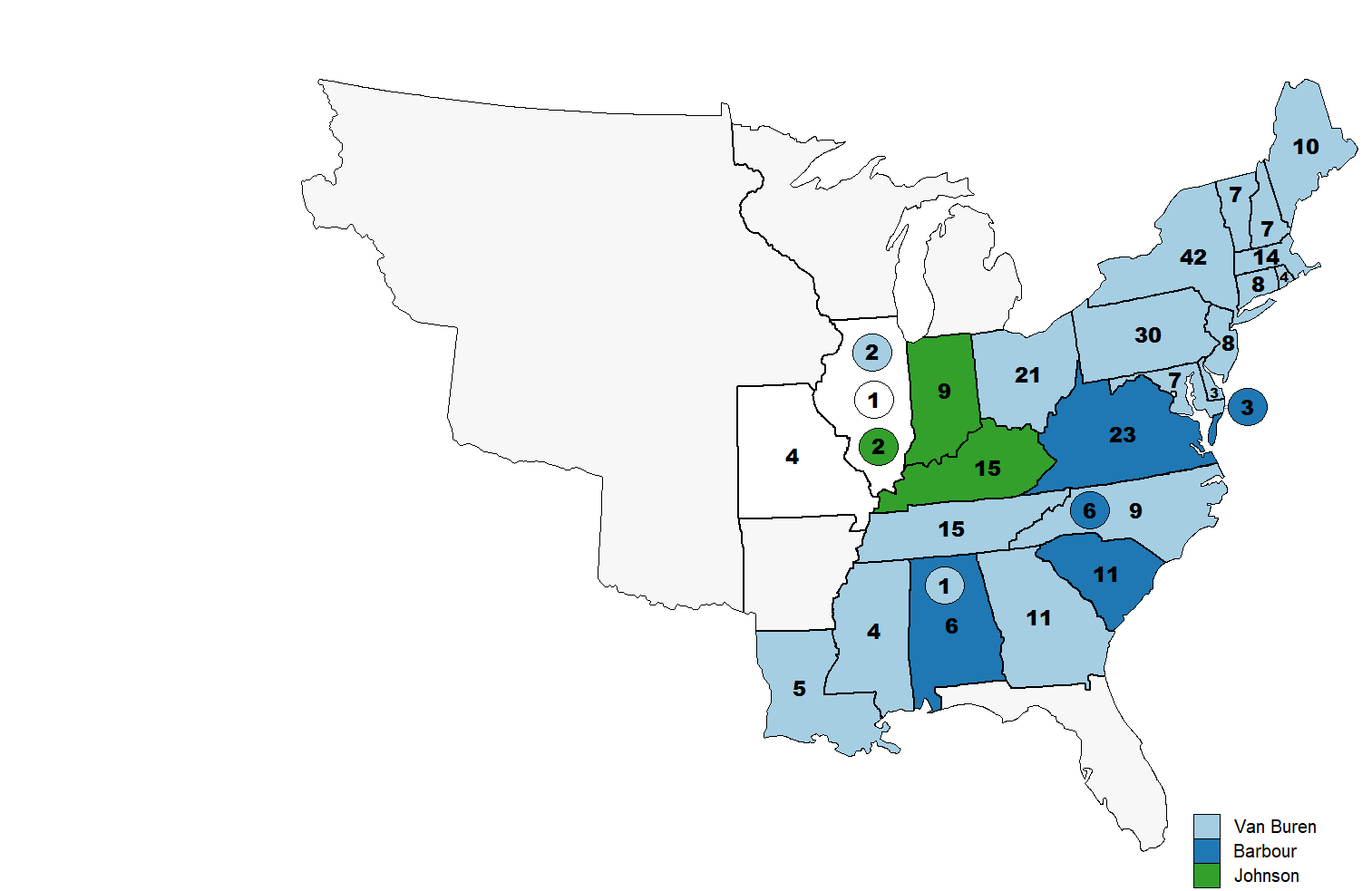
1st Vice Presidential Ballot

== General election ==
Andrew Jackson and Martin Van Buren defeated their main competitors, Henry Clay and John Sergeant of the National Republican Party, by a large electoral vote margin in the election of 1832.

== See also ==
- History of the United States Democratic Party
- List of Democratic National Conventions
- U.S. presidential nomination convention
- 1832 United States presidential election

== Notes ==
Preceded by -	Democratic National Conventions	Succeeded by 1835; Baltimore, Maryland
