= 1832 United States presidential election in New York =

- November 6, 1832
- Turnout: 84.2% ▲4.0 pp
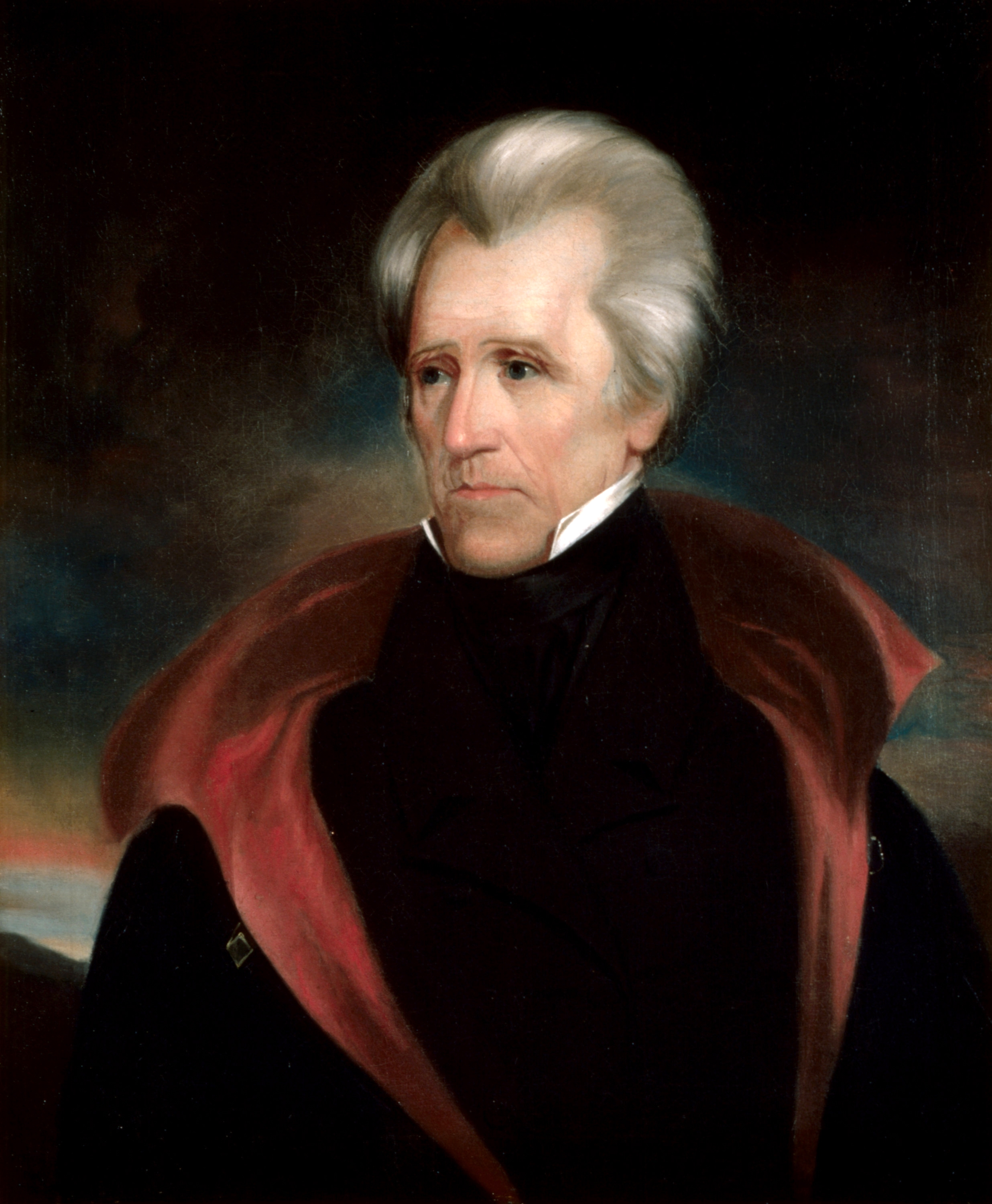

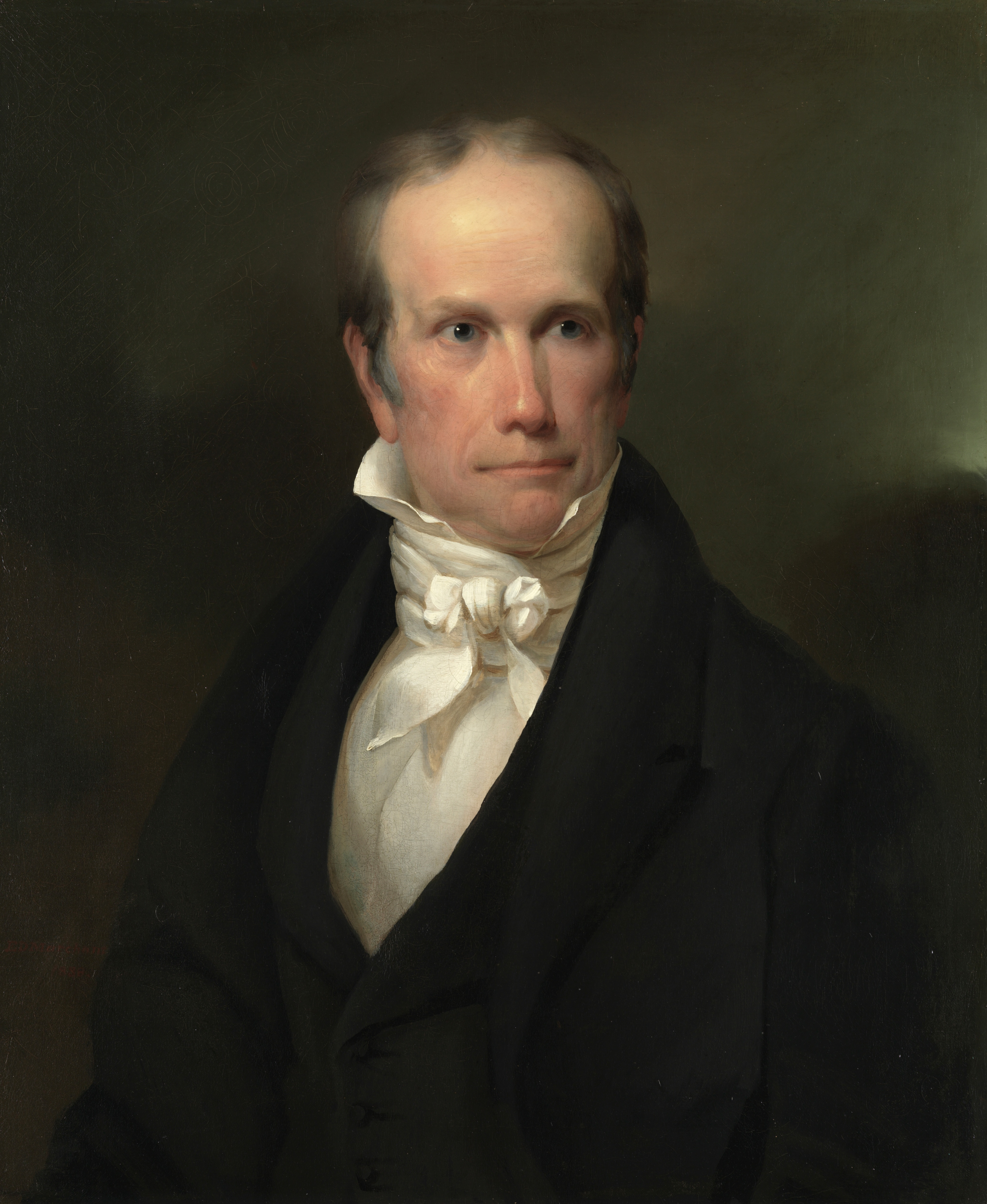
Nominee	Andrew Jackson	Henry Clay
Party	Democratic	National Republican
Alliance		Anti-Masonic
Home state	Tennessee	Kentucky
Running mate	Martin Van Buren	John Sergeant
Electoral vote	42	0
Popular vote	168,497	154,896
Percentage	52.10%	47.90%
County results
Jackson
50–60%
60–70%
70–80%
Clay
50–60%
60–70%
70–80%

The 1832 United States presidential election in New York took place on November 6, 1832, as part of the 1832 United States presidential election. Voters chose 42 representatives, or electors to the electoral college, who voted for president and vice president.

Andrew Jackson was the incumbent president, seeking re-election to a second term on the Democratic Party ticket. Following the results of the previous election, the Adams Republican Party in New York experienced a rapid decline in morale, and leadership of the Anti-Jacksonian opposition fell to the new Anti-Masonic Party. The Anti-Masons nominated former United States Attorney General William Wirt at their national convention in Baltimore in September 1831. Many were hopeful that Wirt would be selected by the National Republican Convention when it met in December, but the party instead nominated Senator Henry Clay of Kentucky. Eager to avoid a split in the Anti-Jacksonian forces, New York Anti-Masonic leaders negotiated a fusion ticket of electors nominated jointly by both parties who were pledged to support whichever candidate stood the best chance of defeating Jackson in the electoral college. On election day, Jackson defeated the fusion ticket by a margin of 4.2 percent.

== Results ==
1832 United States presidential election in New York
Party	Candidate	Votes	Percentage	Electoral votes
Democratic	Andrew Jackson (incumbent)	168,497	52.10%	42
National Republican	Henry Clay	154,896	47.90%	0
Totals		323,393	100.0%	42

=== Results by county ===
County	Andrew Jackson Democratic		Henry Clay National Republican		Margin		Total votes cast
County	#	%	#	%	#	%	Total votes cast
Albany	4,432	50.56%	4,333	47.90%	99	1.13%	8,765
Allegany	2,111	47.49%	2,334	52.51%	-223	-5.02%	4,445
Broome	1,421	45.65%	1,692	54.35%	-271	-8.71%	3,113
Cattaraugus	1,355	43.22%	1,780	56.78%	-425	-13.56%	3,135
Cayuga	4,463	53.23%	3,921	46.77%	542	6.46%	8,384
Chautauqua	2,254	36.21%	3,970	63.79%	-1,716	-27.57%	6,224
Chenango	3,704	52.59%	3,339	47.41%	365	5.18%	7,043
Clinton	1,719	61.17%	1,091	38.83%	628	22.35%	2,810
Columbia	3,965	51.85%	3,682	48.15%	283	3.70%	7,647
Cortland	1.923	48.83%	2,015	51.17%	-92	-2.34%	3,938
Delaware	2,919	59.94%	1,951	40.06%	968	19.88%	4,870
Dutchess	4,893	54.71%	4,051	45.29%	842	9.41%	8,944
Erie	1,813	29.54%	4,324	70.46%	-2,511	-40.92%	6,137
Essex	1,347	43.52%	1,748	56.48%	-401	-12.96%	3,095
Franklin	878	45.21%	1,064	54.79%	-186	-9.58%	1,942
Genesee	3,212	36.33%	5,628	63.67%	-2,416	-27.33%	8,840
Greene	3,080	58.18%	2,214	41.82%	866	16.36%	5,294
Herkimer	3,649	58.69%	2,568	41.31%	1,081	17.39%	6,217
Jefferson	4,381	49.78%	4,420	50.22%	-39	-0.44%	8,801
Kings	1,741	57.94%	1,264	42.06%	477	15.87%	3,005
Lewis	1,466	63.85%	830	36.15%	636	27.70%	2,296
Livingston	1,760	37.36%	2,951	62.64%	-1,191	-25.28%	4,711
Madison	3,496	49.39%	3,582	50.61%	-86	-1.22%	7,078
Monroe	3,458	41.34%	4,906	58.66%	-1,448	-17.31%	8,364
Montgomery (Note: Includes Hamilton County)	4,589	56.67%	3,509	43.33%	1,080	13.34%	8,098
New York	18,020	59.03%	12,506	40.97%	5,514	18.06%	30,526
Niagara	1,309	37.66%	2,167	62.34%	-858	-24.68%	3,476
Oneida	6,414	51.70%	5,991	48.30%	423	3.41%	12,405
Onondaga	5,362	52.92%	4,770	47.08%	592	5.84%	10,132
Ontario	2,440	36.90%	4,172	63.10%	-1,732	-26.19%	6,612
Orange	4,234	59.48%	2,884	40.52%	1,350	18.97%	7,118
Orleans	1,424	46.23%	1,656	53.77%	-232	-7.53%	3,080
Oswego	2,565	51.88%	2,379	48.12%	186	3.76%	4,944
Otsego	4,956	54.90%	4,072	45.10%	884	9.79%	9,028
Putnam	1,191	64.03%	669	35.97%	522	28.06%	1,860
Queens	1,655	54.17%	1,400	45.83%	255	8.35%	3,055
Rensselaer	4,819	53.15%	4,247	46.85%	572	6.31%	9,066
Richmond	574	51.67%	537	48.33%	37	3.33%	1,111
Rockland	975	71.32%	392	28.68%	583	42.65%	1,367
Saratoga	3,547	50.55%	3,470	49.45%	77	1.10%	7,017
Schenectady	1,288	53.62%	1,114	46.38%	174	7.24%	2,402
Schoharie	2,746	62.01%	1,682	37.99%	1,064	24.03%	4,428
Seneca	2,053	53.96%	1,752	46.04%	301	7.91%	3,805
St. Lawrence	3,318	54.39%	2,782	45.61%	536	8.79%	6,100
Steuben	3,966	66.79%	1,972	33.21%	1,994	33.58%	5,938
Suffolk	2,580	63.85%	1,461	36.15%	1,119	27.69%	4,041
Sullivan	1,267	53.60%	1,097	46.40%	170	7.19%	2,364
Tioga	3,155	62.56%	1,888	37.44%	1,267	25.12%	5,043
Tompkins	3,336	52.28%	3,045	47.72%	291	4.56%	6,381
Ulster	3,971	65.64%	2,079	34.36%	1,892	31.27%	6,050
Warren	1,257	65.61%	659	34.39%	598	31.21%	1,916
Washington	2,175	32.23%	4,573	67.77%	-2,398	-35.54%	6,748
Wayne	2,812	51.06%	2,695	48.94%	117	2.12%	5,507
Westchester	3,133	57.74%	2,293	42.26%	840	15.48%	5,426
Yates	1,926	59.24%	1,325	40.76%	601	18.49%	3,251
Total	168,497	52.10%	154,896	47.90%	13,601	4.21%	323,393

== See also ==
- United States presidential elections in New York
