= 1832 United States presidential election in Kentucky =

- November 2 – December 5, 1832
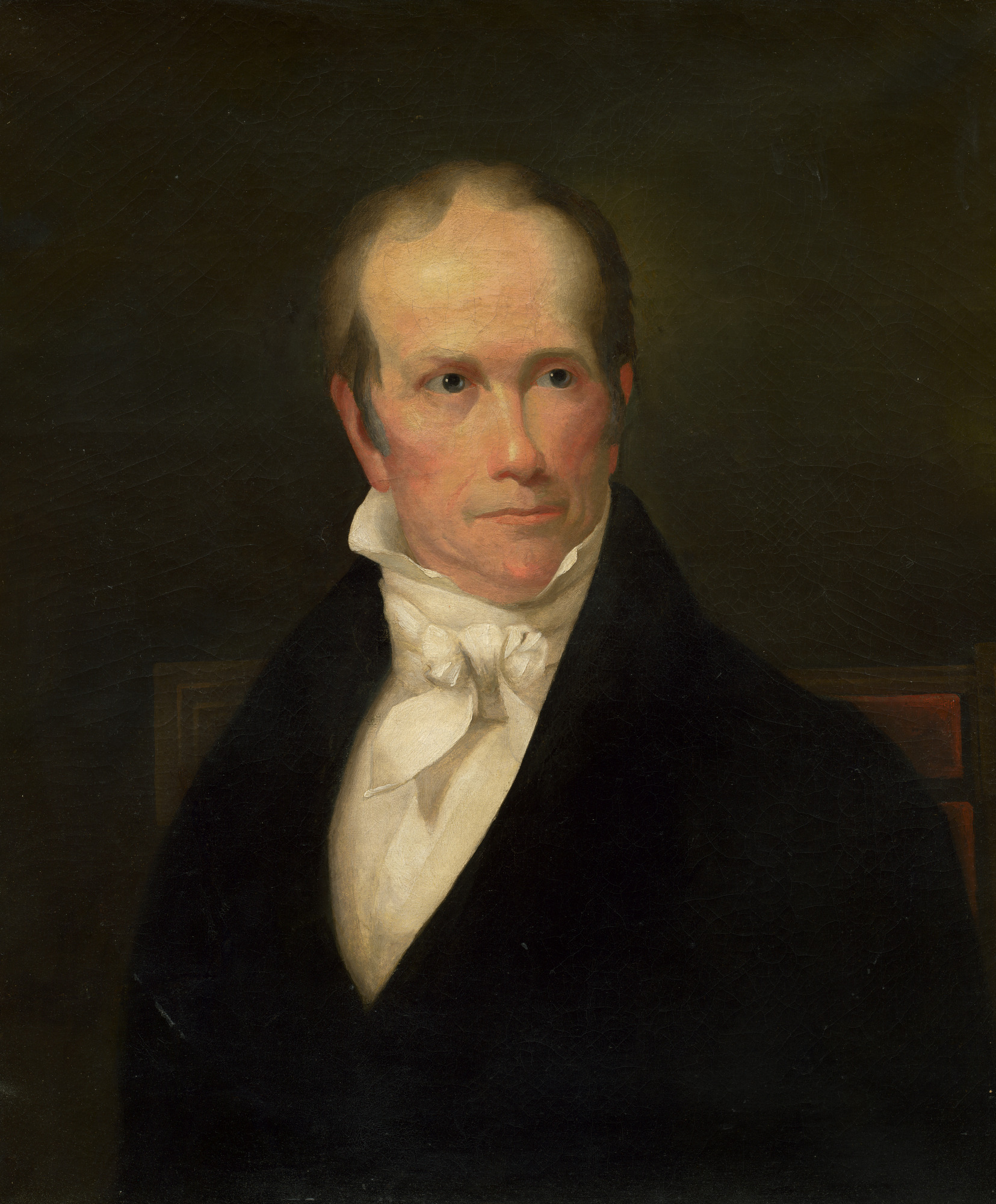

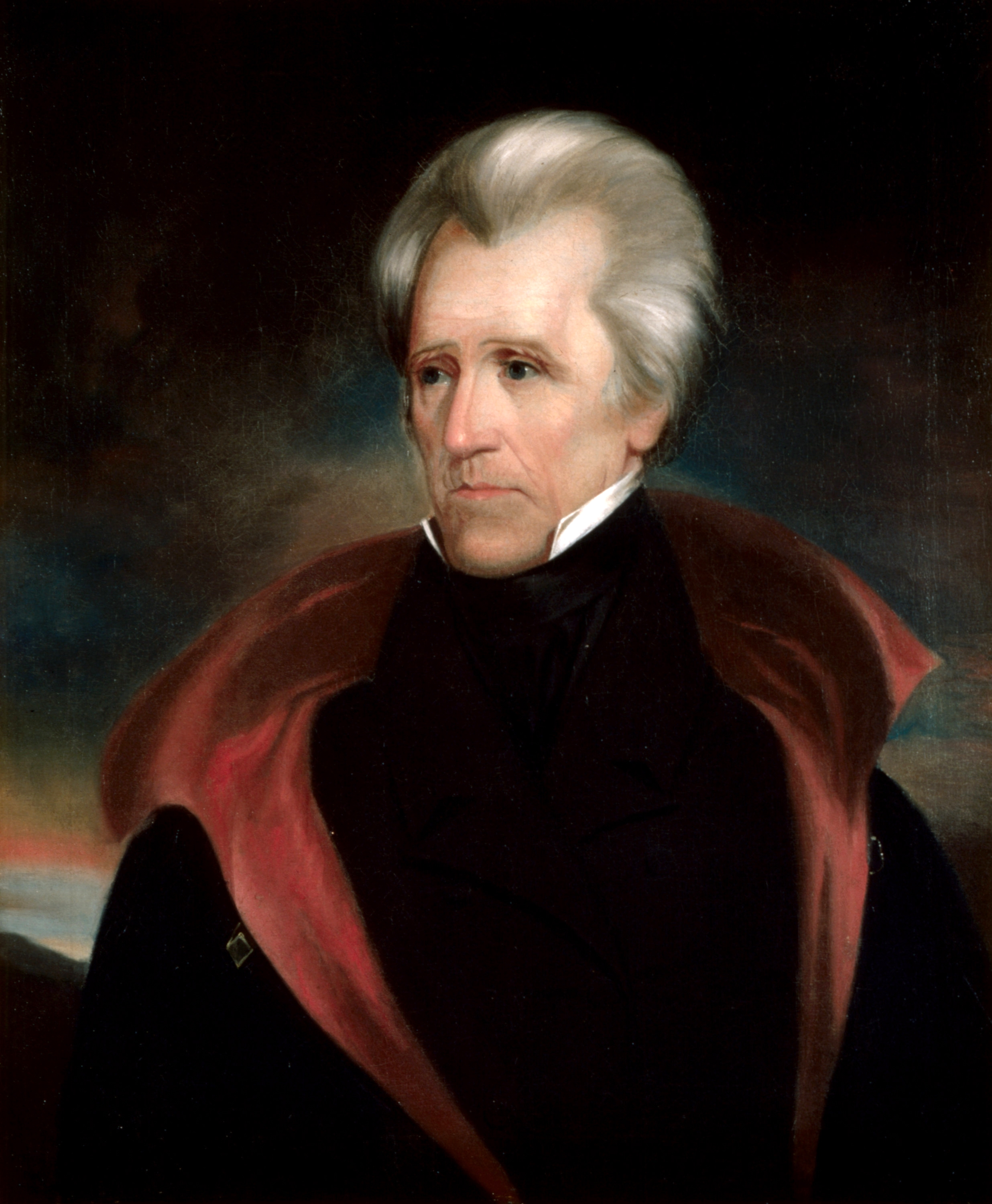
Nominee	Henry Clay	Andrew Jackson
Party	National Republican	Democratic
Home state	Kentucky	Tennessee
Running mate	John Sergeant	Martin Van Buren
Electoral vote	15	0
Popular vote	43,449	36,292
Percentage	54.49%	45.51%
County results
Clay
50–60%
60–70%
70–80%
80–90%
Jackson
50–60%
60–70%
70–80%
80–90%
No Data/Vote

The 1832 United States presidential election in Kentucky took place between November 2 and December 5, 1832, as part of the 1832 United States presidential election. Voters chose 15 representatives, or electors to the Electoral College, who voted for President and Vice President.

Kentucky voted for the National Republican candidate, Henry Clay, over the Democratic Party candidate, Andrew Jackson. Clay won Kentucky by a margin of 8.98%. His victory was likely influenced by the home state advantage he received from his native state. Kentucky and South Carolina were the only two states Jackson lost in 1832 that he had won in the previous cycle.

== Results ==
1832 United States presidential election in Kentucky
Party	Candidate	Votes	Percentage	Electoral votes
National Republican	Henry Clay	43,449	54.49%	15
Democratic	Andrew Jackson (incumbent)	36,292	45.51%	0
Totals		79,741	100.0%	15

== See also ==
- United States presidential elections in Kentucky
