= Henry Lee (economist) =

U.S. political economist (1782–1867)

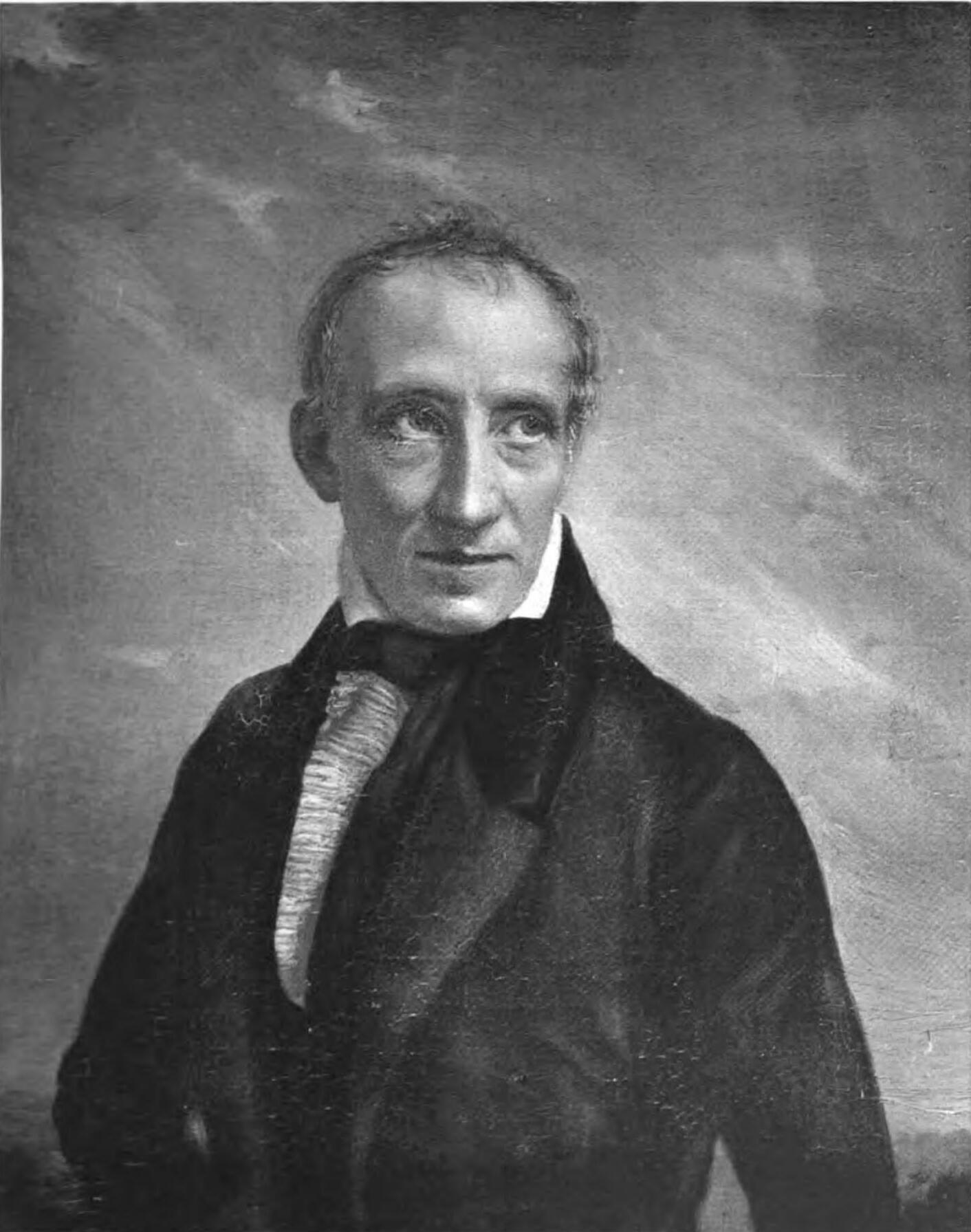

Personal details
- Born: February 4, 1782 Beverly, Massachusetts, U.S.
- Died: February 6, 1867 (aged 85) Boston, Massachusetts, U.S.
- Party: Federalist (before 1832); Nullifier (1832)
- Spouse: Mary Jackson Lee
- Children: 6

Henry Lee (February 4, 1782 – February 6, 1867) was a merchant, political economist and politician from Massachusetts whose writings were popular in England. He was the Nullifier Party's nominee for vice president of the United States in 1832, coming in third place out of four major candidates.

== Economics ==
Henry Lee established himself as a merchant in Boston as one of the owners of the firm H & J Lee & Company. After the economic collapse in 1811, the firm folded and Lee traveled to Calcutta, India for four years. He returned to Boston and became an importer of Indian goods, a business in which he had to pay a 30% tariff and compete with the local Boston Manufacturing Company (of which he later became a shareholder). When the textile business dried up, he began importing indigo, iron and sugar and sold salt to the Du Pont Company for the manufacture of munitions. He dedicated himself to the study of political economy and to the collection of financial and commercial statistics and exchanged correspondences with contemporary British economists such as McCulloch, Tooke, Villiers and Cobden, who considered him an authority. He assisted Albert Gallatin in preparing an analysis of the impact of the tariff on free trade in 1831 and became an advocate of free trade. He was a frequent contributor to the "Free Trade Advocate" and other periodicals and author of the book "Boston Reports" in 1827.

== Politics ==
As a free trade proponent, Lee became an ardent Federalist and in 1830 ran a spirited, but losing campaign, against tariff proponent Nathan Appleton for a United States House seat. Appleton would go on to help write the Tariff of 1832 and the Tariff of 1842.

Though his 1830 race was unsuccessful, it gained him further notoriety as a free trade supporter and so when the new Independent Democratic or Nullifier Party, which strongly opposed tariffs, met on November 20, 1832, in Charleston, South Carolina, Lee was well-known voice for the cause. Henry Lee was thus nominated as the party's candidate for Vice President of the United States in the 1832 election. Lee and his running-mate John Floyd received 11 electoral votes in the Election, coming in third place. The ticket won only one state, South Carolina, in the midst of the Nullification Crisis, and though he was on the ticket, Henry Lee was not a supporter of nullification. At the time, South Carolina was the only state which did not select its presidential electors via popular vote and so it was the legislature that awarded the electors to Floyd and Lee.

Following the 1832 election, Lee returned to his life as a merchant. He and his wife Mary Jackson Lee had six children. His two sons became prominent members of Boston society, both serving as colonels in the Civil War.

Lee died in Boston on February 6, 1867.

== Bibliography ==
- Francis Rollins Morse (1926). Henry and Mary Lee, letters and journals: with other family letters, 1802-1860. Privately printed.
- Henry Lee (1828). Report of a Committee of the Citizens of Boston and Vicinity Opposed to a Further Increase of Duties on Importations. Clayton & Van Norden.
- Henry Lee (1832). Report of a Committee of the Citizens of Boston and Vicinity Opposed to a Further Increase of Duties on Importations. From the Press of Nathan Hale. pp. 3–.
- Hambden (anonymous) (1832). Strictures on Mr. Lee's exposition of evidence on the Sugar Duty, in behalf of the Committee appointed by the Free-Trade Convention. pp. 1–.
- Hambden (anonymous) (1831). First reflections on reading the President's message to Congress of Dec. 7, 1830. Published originally in the National Intelligencer.

Party political offices
New political party	Nullifier nominee for Vice President of the United States; 1828	Succeeded by John Tyler; Endorsed
