= 1832 United States presidential election in Pennsylvania =

- November 2 – December 5, 1832
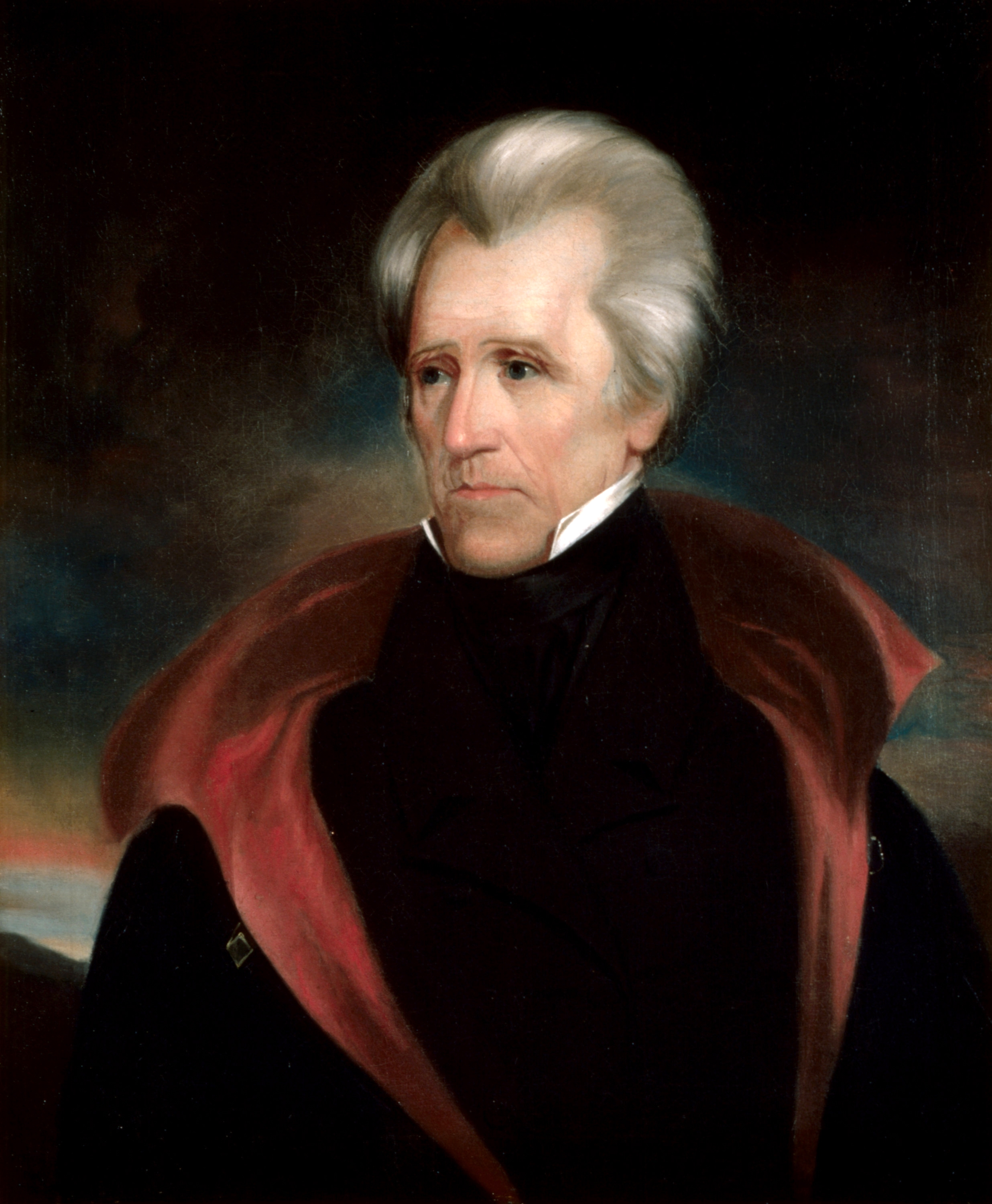

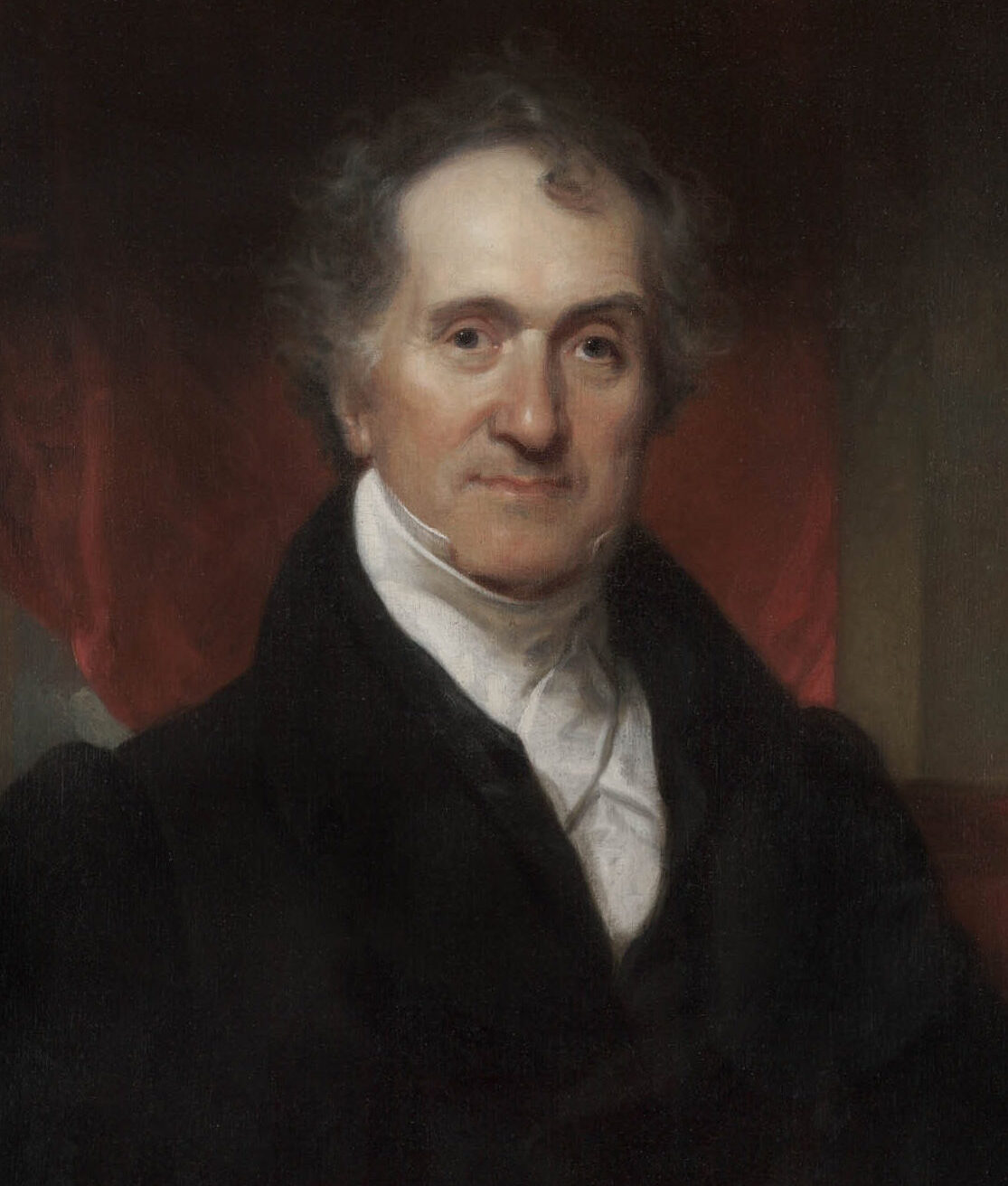
Nominee	Andrew Jackson	William Wirt
Party	Democratic	Anti-Masonic
Alliance		National Republican
Home state	Tennessee	Maryland
Running mate	William Wilkins (Note: Although Martin Van Buren was Jackson's running mate nationally, the 30 Pennsylvania electors voted for William Wilkins for vice president)	Amos Ellmaker
Electoral vote	30	0
Popular vote	91,949	66,689
Percentage	57.96%	42.04%
County results
Jackson
50–60%
60–70%
70–80%
80–90%
90–100%
Wirt
50–60%
60–70%
President before election
Andrew Jackson
Democratic
Elected President
Andrew Jackson
Democratic

A presidential election was held in Pennsylvania between November 2 and December 5, 1832, as part of the 1832 United States presidential election. Voters chose 30 representatives, or electors to the electoral college, who voted for president and vice president.

== Background ==
Andrew Jackson carried Pennsylvania by overwhelming margins in each of his two previous campaigns in 1824 and 1828. Due to the unpopularity of the National Republican Party in the state, the new Anti-Masonic Party took the leading role in opposition to Jackson in Pennsylvania. They nominated former United States Attorney General William Wirt for president at their 1831 national convention in Baltimore. As their own candidate, Henry Clay, stood little chance to carry the state, Pennsylvania's National Republicans chose to cross-endorse Wirt and the Anti-Masonic candidates rather than risk dividing Anti-Jacksonian voters and allowing Jackson to win by a plurality.

The result of the October gubernatorial election encouraged the Anti-Masons, as their candidate, Joseph Ritner, came within 3,000 votes of defeating the Jacksonian nominee. However, in the November presidential election, Jackson handily defeated the "Union ticket" of the Anti-Masons and the National Republicans by a margin of 15 percent. As the intended nominee of the Union ticket, Wirt polled his greatest share of the vote in any state, in spite of his failure to carry Pennsylvania; national partisan polarization hurt the Union ticket, as many German Jacksonians who supported Ritner for governor were unwilling to vote against Jackson in the presidential election. The victorious Democratic electors voted for Jackson as president and William Wilkins as vice president, the state convention having refused to ratify the nomination of Jackson's national running mate, Martin Van Buren. It was also the last time to date Union County, Pennsylvania voted Democratic.

== Results ==
1832 United States presidential election in Pennsylvania
Party	Candidate	Votes	Percentage	Electoral votes
Democratic	Andrew Jackson (incumbent)	91,949	57.96%	30
Anti-Masonic	William Wirt	66,689	42.04%	0
Totals		158,638	100.0%	30

== See also ==
- United States presidential elections in Pennsylvania
