= Elections in Kentucky =

Elections in the U.S. state of Kentucky are held regularly. Politics in Kentucky has historically been very competitive. The state leaned toward the Democratic Party during the 1860s after the Whig Party dissolved. During the Civil War, the southeastern part of the state aligned with the Union and tended to support Republican candidates thereafter, while the central and western portions remained heavily Democratic even into the following decades. Kentucky would be part of the Democratic Solid South until the mid-20th century.

As of April 2024, 48.05 percent of the state's voters were officially registered as Republicans, while 40.05 percent were registered Democrats, whose members tend to be conservative. Some 11.90 percent were registered with another political party or as Independents. Despite past Democratic voter registration advantage, the state has elected Republican candidates for federal office routinely since the beginning of the 21st century.

In a 2020 study, Kentucky was ranked as the 8th hardest state for citizens to vote in.

== Voter registration ==
Current voter registration by county. Republican: 40–50%; 50–60%; 60–70%; 70–80%; 80–90%; Democratic: 40–50%; 50–60%; 60–70%; 70–80%

On October 1, 2026, the state had 3,389,224 registered voters, who were registered with the following parties.

Party	Registration	
Party	Voters	%
Republican	1,626,732	48.00
Democratic	1,373,500	40.53
Independent	182,601	5.39
Libertarian	15,948	0.47
Green	2,627	0.08
Constitution	1,666	0.05
Socialist Workers	757	0.02
Kentucky	462	0.01
Reform	254	0.01
"Other"	184,677	5.45
Total	3,389,224	100.0

== Ballot access ==
Kentucky law divides political parties into three classes, depending on the percentage of the statewide vote they received in the previous presidential election. The three classes are political parties, political organizations, and political groups. Candidates from each class are subject to differing rules of ballot access.

=== Political parties ===
Political parties are the first class of parties and must receive ten percent of the statewide vote in the previous presidential election. Political party candidates are required to be nominated by primary elections, which are operated by the state. Kentucky has closed primaries, meaning that only voters registered with a party may vote in its primary election.

Following the 2024 presidential election, there were two political parties in Kentucky:

- Republican Party of Kentucky
- Kentucky Democratic Party

=== Political organizations ===
Political organizations are the second class of parties and must receive two percent of the statewide vote in the previous presidential election. Political organizations may elect to hold a primary election privately funded by the party, or to nominate a slate of candidates for office by statewide convention. Political organization candidates who are denied nomination by the party may nonetheless run for office by petition with the amount of signatures required for political group candidates.

Following the 2024 presidential election, there were zero political organizations in Kentucky.

Former political organizations include:

- Libertarian Party of Kentucky (2017–2020)
- Reform Party of Kentucky (1997–2000)

=== Political groups ===
Political groups are the third class of parties who did not receive at least two percent of the statewide vote in the previous presidential election. Political groups are not automatically given ballot access; political group candidates must instead run for office by petition. Independent candidates must run for office in the same manner.

The Kentucky State Board of Elections currently recognizes six political groups for the purpose of tracking voter registration:

- Libertarian Party of Kentucky
- Green Party of Kentucky
- Constitution Party of Kentucky
- Socialist Workers Party of Kentucky
- The Kentucky Party
- Reform Party of Kentucky

The number of signatures required of candidates for each office are as follows:

Independent candidate signature requirements
President US Senate Governor Other statewide office (Note: Secretary of State, Attorney General, Auditor of Public Accounts, State Treasurer, or Commissioner of Agriculture.)	5,000
US House	400
County officer (Note: Judge/Executive, Commissioner, County Clerk, Attorney, Jailer, Coroner, Surveyor, Property Valuation Administrator, Sheriff, or Circuit Clerk.) State legislator (Note: Member of the Kentucky Senate or House of Representatives.) Commonwealth’s Attorney	100
Officer of a division less than a county (Note: Constable, Magistrate, or Justice of the Peace.)	20
City officer (Note: Mayor or City Councilman. However, only four cities in Kentucky conduct partisan elections: Hopkinsville, Irvine, Shively, and Wingo.)	2

== Presidential elections ==
United States presidential election results for Kentucky
Year	Republican / Whig		Democratic		Third party(ies)	
Year	No.	%	No.	%	No.	%
1824	0	0.00%	6,356	27.23%	16,982	72.77%
1828	31,468	44.46%	39,308	55.54%	0	0.00%
1832	43,449	54.49%	36,292	45.51%	0	0.00%
1836	36,861	52.59%	33,229	47.41%	0	0.00%
1840	58,488	64.20%	32,616	35.80%	0	0.00%
1844	61,249	54.09%	51,988	45.91%	0	0.00%
1848	67,145	57.46%	49,720	42.54%	0	0.00%
1852	57,428	51.44%	53,949	48.32%	266	0.24%
1856	0	0.00%	74,642	52.54%	67,416	47.46%
1860	1,364	0.93%	25,651	17.54%	119,201	81.52%
1864	27,787	30.17%	64,301	69.83%	0	0.00%
1868	39,566	25.45%	115,889	74.55%	0	0.00%
1872	88,766	46.44%	99,995	52.32%	2,374	1.24%
1876	97,568	37.44%	160,060	61.41%	2,998	1.15%
1880	106,490	39.87%	148,875	55.74%	11,739	4.39%
1884	118,690	42.93%	152,961	55.32%	4,830	1.75%
1888	155,138	44.98%	183,830	53.30%	5,900	1.71%
1892	135,462	39.74%	175,461	51.48%	29,941	8.78%
1896	218,171	48.93%	217,894	48.86%	9,863	2.21%
1900	227,132	48.51%	235,126	50.21%	6,007	1.28%
1904	205,457	47.13%	217,170	49.82%	13,319	3.06%
1908	235,711	48.03%	244,092	49.74%	10,916	2.22%
1912	115,512	25.46%	219,584	48.40%	118,602	26.14%
1916	241,854	46.50%	269,990	51.91%	8,225	1.58%
1920	452,480	49.26%	456,497	49.69%	9,659	1.05%
1924	398,966	48.93%	374,855	45.98%	41,511	5.09%
1928	558,734	59.36%	381,070	40.48%	1,470	0.16%
1932	394,716	40.15%	580,574	59.06%	7,773	0.79%
1936	369,702	39.92%	541,944	58.51%	14,560	1.57%
1940	410,384	42.30%	557,322	57.45%	2,457	0.25%
1944	392,448	45.22%	472,589	54.45%	2,884	0.33%
1948	341,210	41.48%	466,756	56.74%	14,692	1.79%
1952	495,029	49.84%	495,729	49.91%	2,390	0.24%
1956	572,192	54.30%	476,453	45.21%	5,160	0.49%
1960	602,607	53.59%	521,855	46.41%	0	0.00%
1964	372,977	35.65%	669,659	64.01%	3,469	0.33%
1968	462,411	43.79%	397,541	37.65%	195,941	18.56%
1972	676,446	63.37%	371,159	34.77%	19,894	1.86%
1976	531,852	45.57%	615,717	52.75%	19,573	1.68%
1980	635,274	49.07%	616,417	47.61%	42,936	3.32%
1984	822,782	60.04%	539,589	39.37%	8,090	0.59%
1988	734,281	55.52%	580,368	43.88%	7,868	0.59%
1992	617,178	41.34%	665,104	44.55%	210,618	14.11%
1996	623,283	44.88%	636,614	45.84%	128,811	9.28%
2000	872,492	56.50%	638,898	41.37%	32,797	2.12%
2004	1,069,439	59.54%	712,733	39.68%	13,907	0.77%
2008	1,048,462	57.37%	751,985	41.15%	27,140	1.49%
2012	1,087,190	60.47%	679,370	37.78%	31,488	1.75%
2016	1,202,971	62.52%	628,854	32.68%	92,325	4.80%
2020	1,326,646	62.05%	772,474	36.13%	38,889	1.82%
2024	1,337,494	64.40%	704,043	33.90%	35,289	1.70%

Since 1952, voters in the Commonwealth supported the three Democratic candidates elected to the White House, all from Southern states: Lyndon B. Johnson from Texas in 1964, Jimmy Carter from Georgia in 1976, and Bill Clinton from Arkansas in 1992 and 1996. But by the 21st century, the state had become a Republican stronghold in federal elections, supporting that party's presidential candidates by double-digit margins since 2000.

From 1964 through 2004, Kentucky voted for the eventual winner of the presidential election each time, until losing its bellwether status in the 2008 election. That year Republican John McCain won Kentucky, carrying it 57 percent to 41 percent, but lost the national popular and electoral votes to Democrat Barack Obama. Further hampering Kentucky's status as a bellwether state, 116 of Kentucky's 120 counties supported Republican Mitt Romney in the 2012 election, who lost to Barack Obama nationwide.

== See also ==
- 2024 Kentucky elections
- United States presidential elections in Kentucky
- Elections in the United States
