= United States presidential elections in Kentucky =

Presidential elections in Kentucky
- Number of elections: 59
- Voted Democratic: 26
- Voted Republican: 17
- Voted Whig: 5
- Voted Democratic-Republican: 9
- Voted other: 2 (Note: John Bell, 1860; George Washington, 1792.)
- Voted for winning candidate: 38
- Voted for losing candidate: 21

Following is a table of United States presidential elections in Kentucky, ordered by year. Since its admission to statehood in 1792, Kentucky has participated in every U.S. presidential election. Prior to the election of 1792, Kentucky was part of Virginia, and residents of the area voted as part of that state.

Winners of the state are in bold.

== Elections from 1864 to present ==
View source data.

Year	Winner (nationally)	Votes	Percent	Runner-up (nationally)	Votes	Percent	Other national candidates (Note: For purposes of these lists, other national candidates are defined as those who won at least one electoral vote, or won at least ten percent of the vote in multiple states.)	Votes	Percent	Electoral Votes	Notes
2024	**Donald Trump**	1,337,494	64.47	Kamala Harris	704,043	33.94	—			8	
2020	Joe Biden	772,474	36.15	**Donald Trump**	1,326,646	62.09	—			8	
2016	**Donald Trump** (Note: Won the electoral college while losing the popular vote)	1,202,971	62.52	Hillary Clinton	628,854	32.68	—			8	
2012	Barack Obama	679,370	37.80	**Mitt Romney**	1,087,190	60.49	—			8	
2008	Barack Obama	751,985	41.17	**John McCain**	1,048,462	57.40	—			8	
2004	**George W. Bush**	1,069,439	59.55	John Kerry	712,733	39.69	—			8	
2000	**George W. Bush**	872,492	56.50	Al Gore	638,898	41.37	—			8	
1996	**Bill Clinton**	636,614	45.84	Bob Dole	623,283	44.88	Ross Perot	120,396	8.67	8	
1992	**Bill Clinton**	665,104	44.55	George H. W. Bush	617,178	41.34	Ross Perot	203,944	13.66	8	
1988	**George H. W. Bush**	734,281	55.52	Michael Dukakis	580,368	43.88	—			9	
1984	**Ronald Reagan**	822,785	60.04	Walter Mondale	539,589	39.37	—			9	
1980	**Ronald Reagan**	635,274	49.07	Jimmy Carter	616,417	47.61	John B. Anderson	31,127	2.40	9	
1976	**Jimmy Carter**	615,717	52.75	Gerald Ford	531,852	45.57	—			9	
1972	**Richard Nixon**	676,446	63.37	George McGovern	371,159	34.77	—			9	
1968	**Richard Nixon**	462,411	43.79	Hubert Humphrey	397,541	37.65	George Wallace	193,098	18.29	9	
1964	**Lyndon B. Johnson**	669,659	64.01	Barry Goldwater	372,977	35.65	—			9	
1960	John F. Kennedy	521,855	46.41	**Richard Nixon**	602,607	53.59	—			10	
1956	**Dwight D. Eisenhower**	572,192	54.30	Adlai Stevenson II	476,453	45.21	T. Coleman Andrews/ Unpledged Electors (Note: Was allied with a slate of unpledged electors in Louisiana, Mississippi and South Carolina)	—	—	10	
1952	Dwight D. Eisenhower	495,029	49.84	**Adlai Stevenson II**	495,729	49.91	—			10	
1948	**Harry S. Truman**	466,756	56.74	Thomas E. Dewey	341,210	41.48	Strom Thurmond	10,411	1.27	11	
1944	**Franklin D. Roosevelt**	472,589	54.45	Thomas E. Dewey	392,448	45.22	—			11	
1940	**Franklin D. Roosevelt**	557,222	57.44	Wendell Willkie	410,384	42.30	—			11	
1936	**Franklin D. Roosevelt**	541,944	58.51	Alf Landon	369,702	39.92	—			11	
1932	**Franklin D. Roosevelt**	580,574	59.06	Herbert Hoover	394,716	40.15	—			11	
1928	**Herbert Hoover**	558,064	59.33	Al Smith	381,070	40.51	—			13	
1924	**Calvin Coolidge**	398,966	48.93	John W. Davis	374,855	45.98	Robert M. La Follette	38,465	4.72	13	
1920	Warren G. Harding	452,480	49.25	**James M. Cox**	456,497	49.69	Parley P. Christensen	—	—	13	
1916	**Woodrow Wilson**	269,990	51.91	Charles E. Hughes	241,854	46.50	—			13	
1912	**Woodrow Wilson**	219,484	48.48	Theodore Roosevelt	101,766	22.48	William H. Taft	115,510	25.52	13	
1908	William H. Taft	235,711	48.03	**William Jennings Bryan**	244,092	49.74	—			13	
1904	Theodore Roosevelt	205,457	47.13	**Alton B. Parker**	217,170	49.82	—			13	
1900	William McKinley	227,132	48.51	**William Jennings Bryan**	235,126	50.21	—			13	
1896	**William McKinley**	218,171	48.93	William Jennings Bryan	217,894	48.86	—			13	Electoral vote split twelve to one.
1892	**Grover Cleveland**	175,461	51.48	Benjamin Harrison	135,462	39.74	James B. Weaver	23,500	6.89	13	
1888	Benjamin Harrison	155,138	44.98	**Grover Cleveland**	183,830	53.30	—			13	
1884	**Grover Cleveland**	152,961	55.32	James G. Blaine	118,690	42.93	—			13	
1880	James A. Garfield	106,490	39.87	**Winfield S. Hancock**	148,875	55.74	James B. Weaver	11,506	4.31	12	
1876	Rutherford B. Hayes	97,568	37.44	**Samuel J. Tilden**	160,060	61.41	—			12	
1872	Ulysses S. Grant	88,766	46.44	**Horace Greeley**	99,995	52.32	—			12	
1868	Ulysses S. Grant	39,566	25.5	**Horatio Seymour**	115,889	74.5	—			11	
1864	Abraham Lincoln	27,787	30.2	**George B. McClellan**	64,301	69.8	—			11	

== Election of 1860 ==
The election of 1860 was a complex realigning election in which the breakdown of the previous two-party alignment culminated in four parties each competing for influence in different parts of the country. The result of the election, with the victory of an ardent opponent of slavery, spurred the secession of eleven states and brought about the American Civil War.

Year	Winner (nationally)	Votes	Percent	Runner-up (nationally)	Votes	Percent	Runner-up (nationally)	Votes	Percent	Runner-up (nationally)	Votes	Percent	Electoral Votes
1860	Abraham Lincoln	1,364	0.9	Stephen A. Douglas	25,651	17.5	John C. Breckinridge	53,143	36.3	**John Bell**	66,058	45.2	12

== Elections from 1828 to 1856 ==
Year	Winner (nationally)	Votes	Percent	Runner-up (nationally)	Votes	Percent	Other national candidates	Votes	Percent	Electoral Votes	Notes
1856	**James Buchanan**	74,642	52.54	John C. Frémont	no ballots		Millard Fillmore	67,416	47.46	12	
1852	Franklin Pierce	53,494	48.32	**Winfield Scott**	57,428	51.44	John P. Hale	266	0.24	12	
1848	**Zachary Taylor**	67,145	57.46	Lewis Cass	49,720	42.54	Martin Van Buren	no ballots		12	
1844	James K. Polk	51,988	45.91	**Henry Clay**	61,249	54.09	—			12	
1840	**William Henry Harrison**	58,488	64.20	Martin Van Buren	32,616	35.80	—			15	
1836	Martin Van Buren	33,229	47.41	**William Henry Harrison**	36,861	52.59	various (Note: Three other candidates ran and received electoral votes nationally as part of the unsuccessful Whig strategy to defeat Martin Van Buren by running four candidates with local appeal in different regions of the country. The others were Hugh Lawson White, Daniel Webster, and Willie Person Mangum. None of these candidates appeared on the ballot in Kentucky.)			15	
1832	Andrew Jackson	36,292	45.51	**Henry Clay**	43,449	54.49	William Wirt	no ballots		15	
1828	**Andrew Jackson**	39,308	55.54	John Quincy Adams	31,468	44.46	—			14	

== Election of 1824 ==
The election of 1824 was a complex realigning election following the collapse of the prevailing Democratic-Republican Party, resulting in four different candidates each claiming to carry the banner of the party, and competing for influence in different parts of the country. The election was the only one in history to be decided by the House of Representatives under the provisions of the Twelfth Amendment to the United States Constitution after no candidate secured a majority of the electoral vote. It was also the only presidential election in which the candidate who received a plurality of electoral votes (Andrew Jackson) did not become president, a source of great bitterness for Jackson and his supporters, who proclaimed the election of Adams a corrupt bargain.

Year	Winner (nationally)	Votes	Percent	Runner-up (nationally)	Votes	Percent	Runner-up (nationally)	Votes	Percent	Runner-up (nationally)	Votes	Percent	Electoral Votes
1824	Andrew Jackson	6,356	27.23	John Quincy Adams	no ballots		**Henry Clay**	16,982	72.77	William H. Crawford	no ballots		14

== Elections from 1792 to 1820 ==
In the election of 1820, incumbent President James Monroe ran effectively unopposed, winning all twelve of Kentucky's electoral votes, and all electoral votes nationwide except one vote in New Hampshire. To the extent that a popular vote was held, it was primarily directed to filling the office of vice president.

Year	Winner (nationally)	Runner-up (nationally)	Electoral Votes	Notes
1820	**James Monroe**	-	12	Monroe effectively ran unopposed.
1816	**James Monroe**	Rufus King	12	
1812	**James Madison**	DeWitt Clinton	12	
1808	**James Madison**	Charles C. Pinckney	7	
1804	**Thomas Jefferson**	Charles C. Pinckney	8	
1800	**Thomas Jefferson**	John Adams	4	
1796	John Adams	**Thomas Jefferson**	4	
1792	**George Washington**	—	4	Washington effectively ran unopposed.

== See also ==
- Elections in Kentucky
