= 1816 United States presidential election in Kentucky =

- November 11–13, 1816
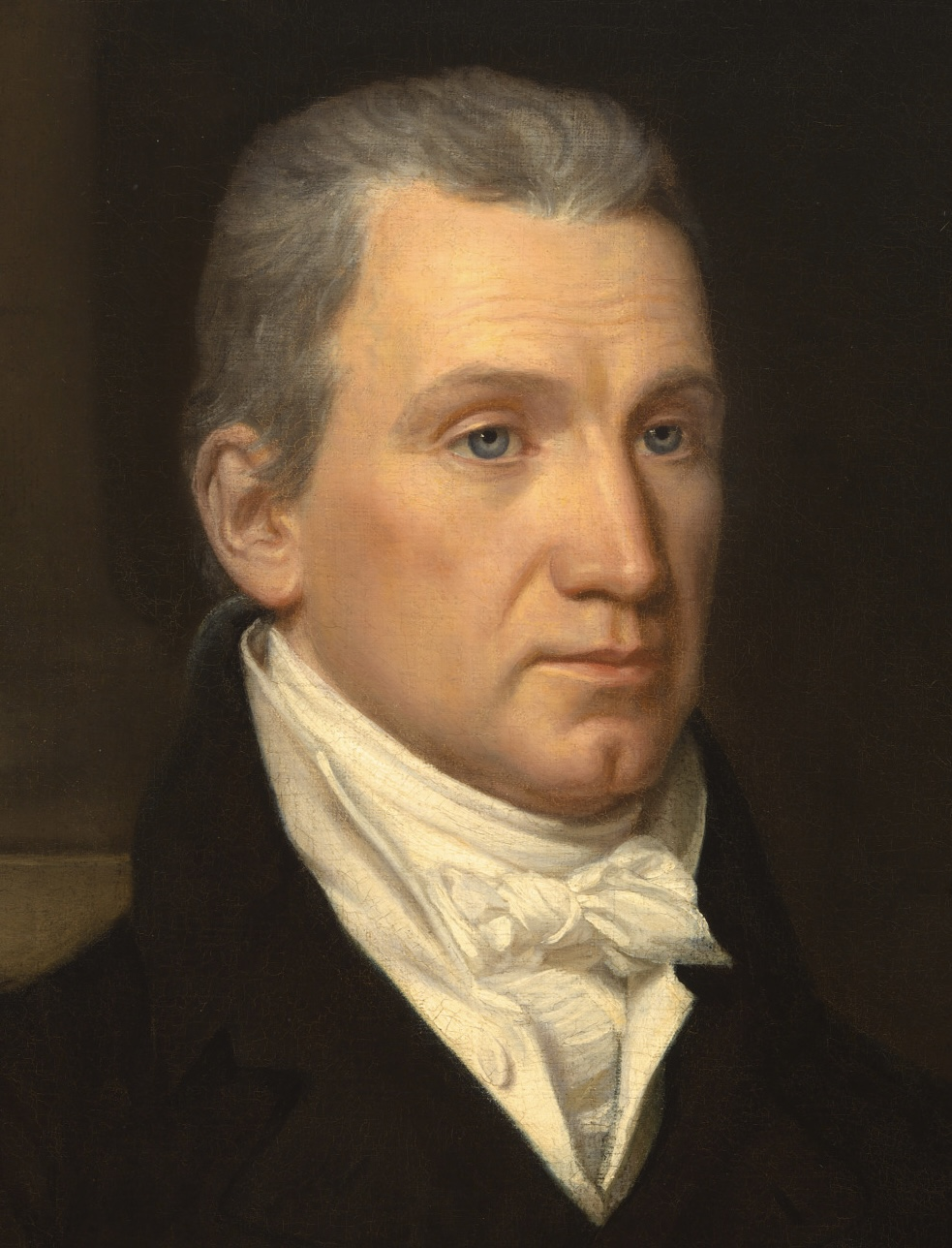
Nominee	James Monroe
Party	Democratic-Republican
Home state	Virginia
Running mate	Daniel D. Tompkins
Electoral vote	12
Popular vote	1,864
Percentage	100.0%
President before election
James Madison
Democratic-Republican
Elected President
James Monroe
Democratic-Republican

A presidential election was held in Kentucky from November 11–13, 1816 as part of the 1816 United States presidential election. The Democratic-Republican ticket of the U.S. secretary of state James Monroe and the governor of New York Daniel D. Tompkins was elected unopposed. The Federalist Party failed to nominate a candidate. Monroe won the national election handily, defeating the senior U.S. senator from New York Rufus King, who received 34 votes from unpledged electors despite not being a candidate. In Kentucky, 30 candidates ran in three four-member electoral districts, all pledged to Monroe; complete popular vote returns for all but the 2nd district have been lost.

== General election ==
=== Summary ===
Kentucky chose twelve electors from three electoral districts, each represented by four members. Returns from the 1st district have been lost. From the 3rd district, only the returns from Fayette County survive. In contrast, returns from all but two counties in the 2nd district have been located.

Nineteenth century election laws required voters to vote directly for members of the Electoral College rather than for president. This sometimes resulted in small differences in the number of votes cast for electors pledged to the same presidential candidate if some voters did not vote for all the electors nominated by a party. In Kentucky, voters in each district had the option to vote for four out of between seven and fifteen candidates—all Democratic-Republicans pledged to Monroe and Tompkins. The below table calculates Monroe's statewide popular vote by adding the votes for the most popular elector in each district. In counties where the district winner received fewer votes than one or several candidates, this method may understate Monroe's statewide total.

1816 United States presidential election in Kentucky
Party	Candidate	Votes	%
Democratic-Republican	James Monroe Daniel D. Tompkins	1,864	100.00
Total votes		1,864	100.00

=== Results by district ===
The below table counts the result for the most popular elector pledged to Monroe in each district with surviving returns. It thus differs slightly from the county results table, which calculates the Democratic-Republican vote from the results for the most popular Monroe elector in each county.

District	Electoral votes	James Monroe Democratic-Republican			Total
District	Electoral votes	Votes	Percent	Electoral votes	Total
Kentucky–1	4	**		4	**
Kentucky–2	4	1,508	100.00	4	1,508
Kentucky–3	4	356	100.00	4	356
TOTAL	12	1,864	100.00	12	1,864

==== District 1 ====
Adair — Allen — Barren — Breckinridge — Butler — Caldwell — Christian — Cumberland — Daviess — Green — Grayson — Hardin — Henderson — Hopkins — Livingston — Logan — Muhlenberg — Ohio — Pulaski — Union — Warren — Wayne

1816 United States presidential election in Kentucky's 1st electoral district (Note: No surviving returns)
Party	Candidate	Votes
Democratic-Republican	Robert Ewing	**
Democratic-Republican	Samuel Caldwell	**
Democratic-Republican	Samuel Murrell	**
Democratic-Republican	Alexander Adair	**
Democratic-Republican	Simeon Buford	**
Democratic-Republican	Robert E. Yates	**
Democratic-Republican	William W. Baptist	**
Democratic-Republican	Presley O'Bannon	**
Democratic-Republican	Henry Towns	**
Democratic-Republican	John W. Powell	**
Democratic-Republican	William Harris	**
Democratic-Republican	John W. Delany	**
Democratic-Republican	Henry Dixon	**
Democratic-Republican	John P. Oldham	**
Democratic-Republican	John DeWitt	**
Total		**

==== District 2 ====
Bullitt — Casey — Clay — Estill — Franklin — Gallatin — Garrard — Henry — Jefferson — Knox — Lincoln — Madison — Mercer — Nelson — Rockcastle — Shelby — Washington

1816 United States presidential election in Kentucky's 2nd electoral district
Party	Candidate	Votes
Democratic-Republican	William Lee	1,508
Democratic-Republican	Willis A. Logan	1,454
Democratic-Republican	Richard Taylor	1,344
Democratic-Republican	William Irvine	1,139
Democratic-Republican	Robert B. McAfee	803
Democratic-Republican	Joseph Pollard	444
Democratic-Republican	David Oliver	409
Total		>1,508

==== District 3 ====
Bath — Boone — Bourbon — Bracken — Campbell — Clark — Fayette — Fleming — Floyd — Greenup — Harrison — Jessamine — Lewis — Mason — Montgomery — Nicholas — Pendleton — Scott — Woodford

1816 United States presidential election in Kentucky's 3rd electoral district (Note: This table reflects the popular vote in Fayette County, the only county comprising the 3rd district with surviving returns. Although Thomas D. Owings outran Duval Payne by two votes in this county, Payne and not Owings was elected by the district.)
Party	Candidate	Votes
Democratic-Republican	Thomas Bodley	356
Democratic-Republican	Hubbard Taylor	234
Democratic-Republican	Robert Trimble	200
Democratic-Republican	Thomas D. Owings	142
Democratic-Republican	Duval Payne	140
Democratic-Republican	Walker Baylor	100
Democratic-Republican	John Jouitt	42
Democratic-Republican	William Moore	12
Total		>356

=== Results by county ===
The below table counts the result for the most popular elector pledged to Monroe in each county with surviving returns. It thus differs slightly from the district results table, which calculates the Democratic-Republican vote from the results for the most popular Monroe elector in each district.

County	D	James Monroe Democratic-Republican		Total
County	D	Votes	Percent	Total
Adair	1	**		**
Allen	1	**		**
Barren	1	**		**
Bath	3	**		**
Boone	3	**		**
Bourbon	3	**		**
Bracken	3	**		**
Breckinridge	1	**		**
Bullitt	2	35	100.00	35
Butler	1	**		**
Caldwell	1	**		**
Campbell	3	**		**
Christian	1	**		**
Clark	3	**		**
Casey	2	57	100.00	57
Clay	2	47	100.00	47
Cumberland	1	**		**
Daviess	1	**		**
Estill	2	26	100.00	26
Fayette	3	356	100.00	356
Fleming	3	**		**
Floyd	3	**		**
Franklin	2	260	100.00	260
Gallatin	2	78	100.00	78
Garrard	2	73	100.00	73
Grayson	1	**		**
Green	1	**		**
Greenup	3	**		**
Hardin	1	**		**
Harrison	3	**		**
Henderson	1	**		**
Henry	2	157	100.00	157
Hopkins	1	**		**
Jefferson	2	391	100.00	391
Jessamine	3	**		**
Knox	2	**		**
Lewis	3	**		**
Lincoln	2	136	100.00	136
Livingston	1	**		**
Logan	1	**		**
Madison	2	202	100.00	202
Mason	3	**		**
Mercer	2	152	100.00	152
Montgomery	3	**		**
Nelson	2	90	100.00	90
Muhlenberg	1	**		**
Nicholas	3	**		**
Ohio	1	**		**
Pendleton	3	**		**
Pulaski	1	**		**
Rockcastle	2	39	100.00	39
Scott	3	**		**
Shelby	2	134	100.00	134
Union	1	**		**
Warren	1	**		**
Washington	2	**		**
Wayne	1	**		**
Woodford	3	**		**
District total	1	**		**
District total	2	1,877	100.00	1,877
District total	3	356	100.00	356
TOTAL		2,233	100.00	2,233

=== Electoral college ===
1816 United States Electoral College vote in Kentucky
For President				For Vice President			
Candidate	Party	Home state	Electoral vote	Candidate	Party	Home state	Electoral vote
James Monroe	Democratic-Republican	Virginia	12	Daniel D. Tompkins	Democratic-Republican	New York	12
Total			12	Total			12

== See also ==
- United States presidential elections in Kentucky
