= 1848 United States presidential election in Kentucky =

- November 7, 1848
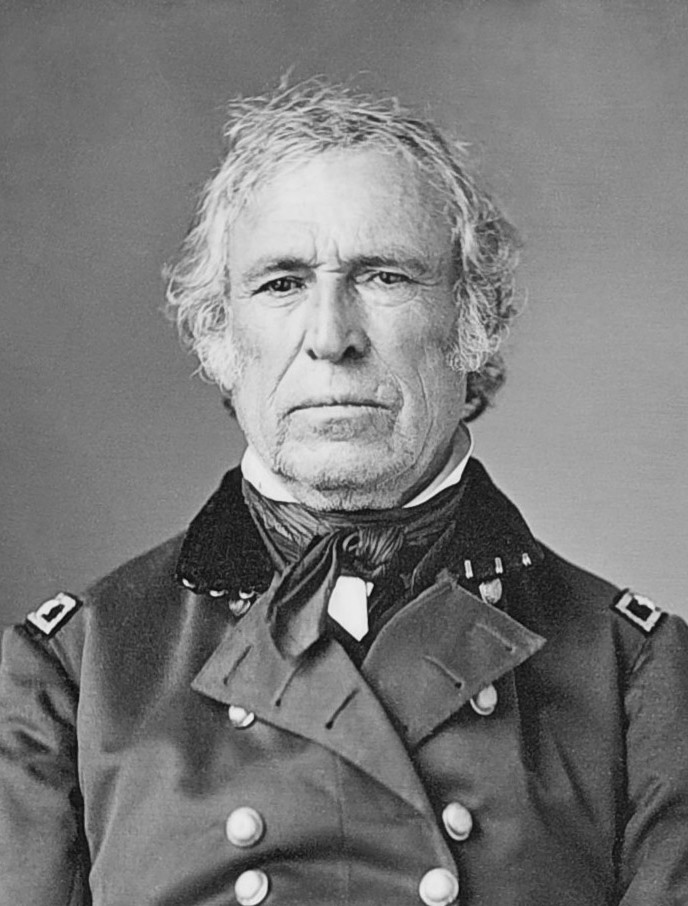

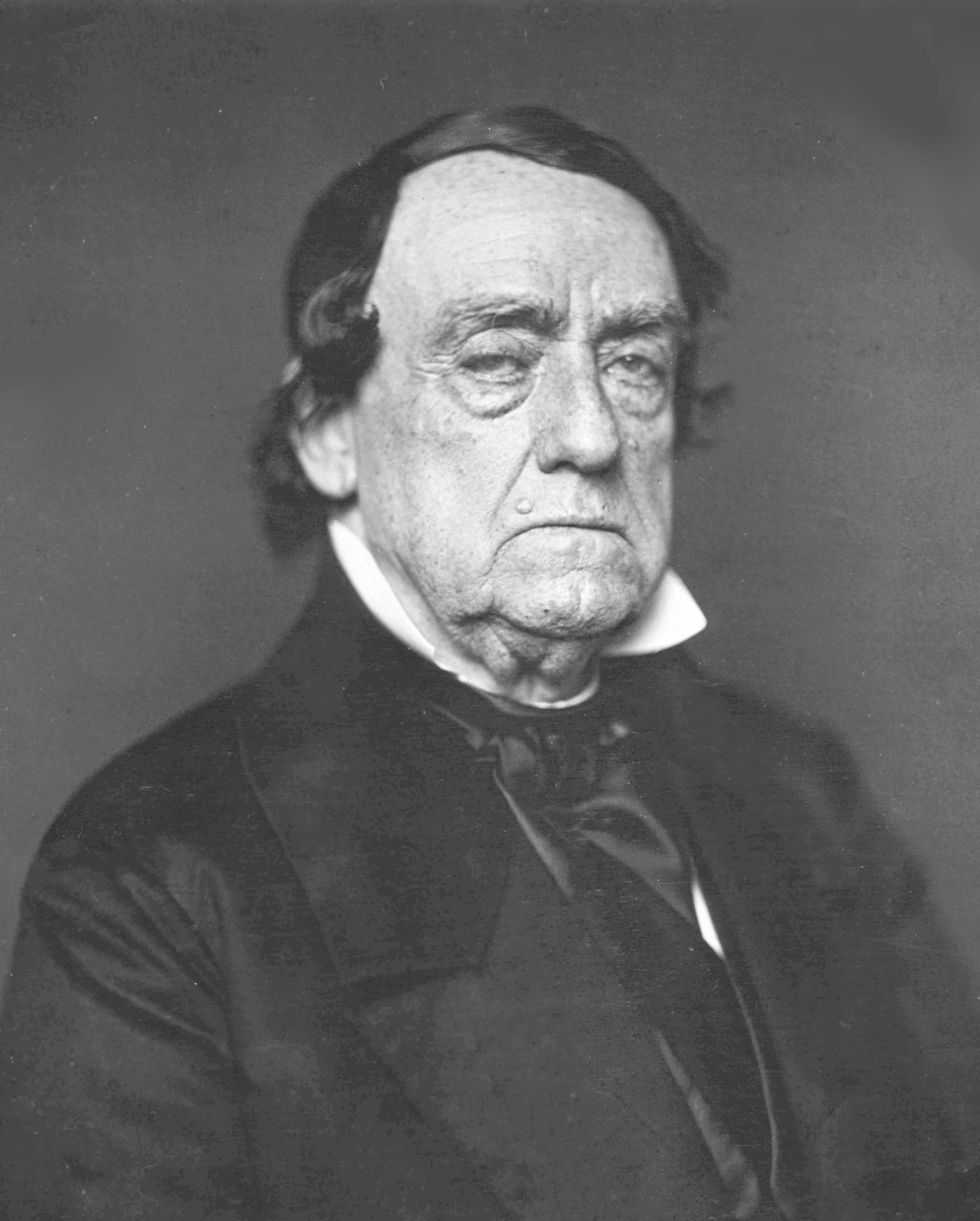
| Nominee | Zachary Taylor | Lewis Cass |
| Party | Whig | Democratic |
| Home state | Louisiana | Michigan |
| Running mate | Millard Fillmore | William O. Butler |
| Electoral vote | 12 | 0 |
| Popular vote | 67,145 | 49,720 |
| Percentage | 57.46% | 42.54% |
County results
Taylor
50–60%
60–70%
70–80%
80–90%
Cass
50–60%
60–70%
70–80%
80–90%
No returns
President before election
James K. Polk
Democratic
Elected President
Zachary Taylor
Whig

The 1848 United States presidential election in Kentucky took place on November 7, 1848, as part of the 1848 United States presidential election. Voters chose 12 representatives, or electors to the Electoral College, who voted for President and Vice President.

Kentucky voted for the Whig candidate, Zachary Taylor, over Democratic candidate Lewis Cass. Taylor won Kentucky by a margin of 14.92%.

== Results ==
1848 United States presidential election in Kentucky
| Party | Candidate | Running mate | Popular vote | | Electoral vote | |
| Party | Candidate | Running mate | Count | % | Count | % |
|---|---|---|---|---|---|---|
| Whig | Zachary Taylor of Louisiana | Millard Fillmore of New York | 67,145 | 57.46% | 12 | 100.00% |
| Democratic | Lewis Cass of Michigan | William O. Butler of Kentucky | 49,720 | 42.54% | 0 | 0.00% |
| Total | | | 116,865 | 100.00% | 12 | 100.00% |

== See also ==
- United States presidential elections in Kentucky
