= 1860 United States presidential election in Kentucky =

- November 6, 1860
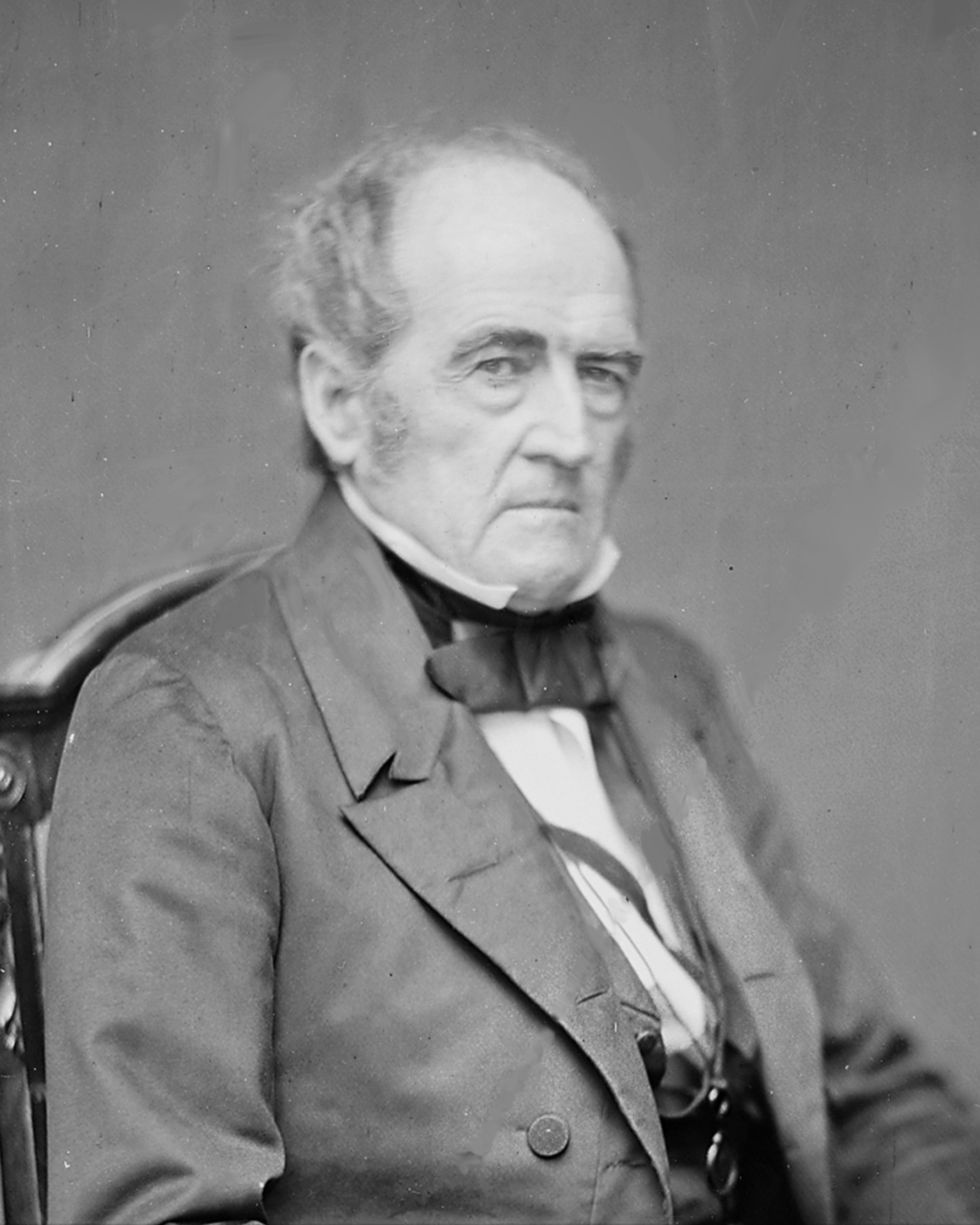

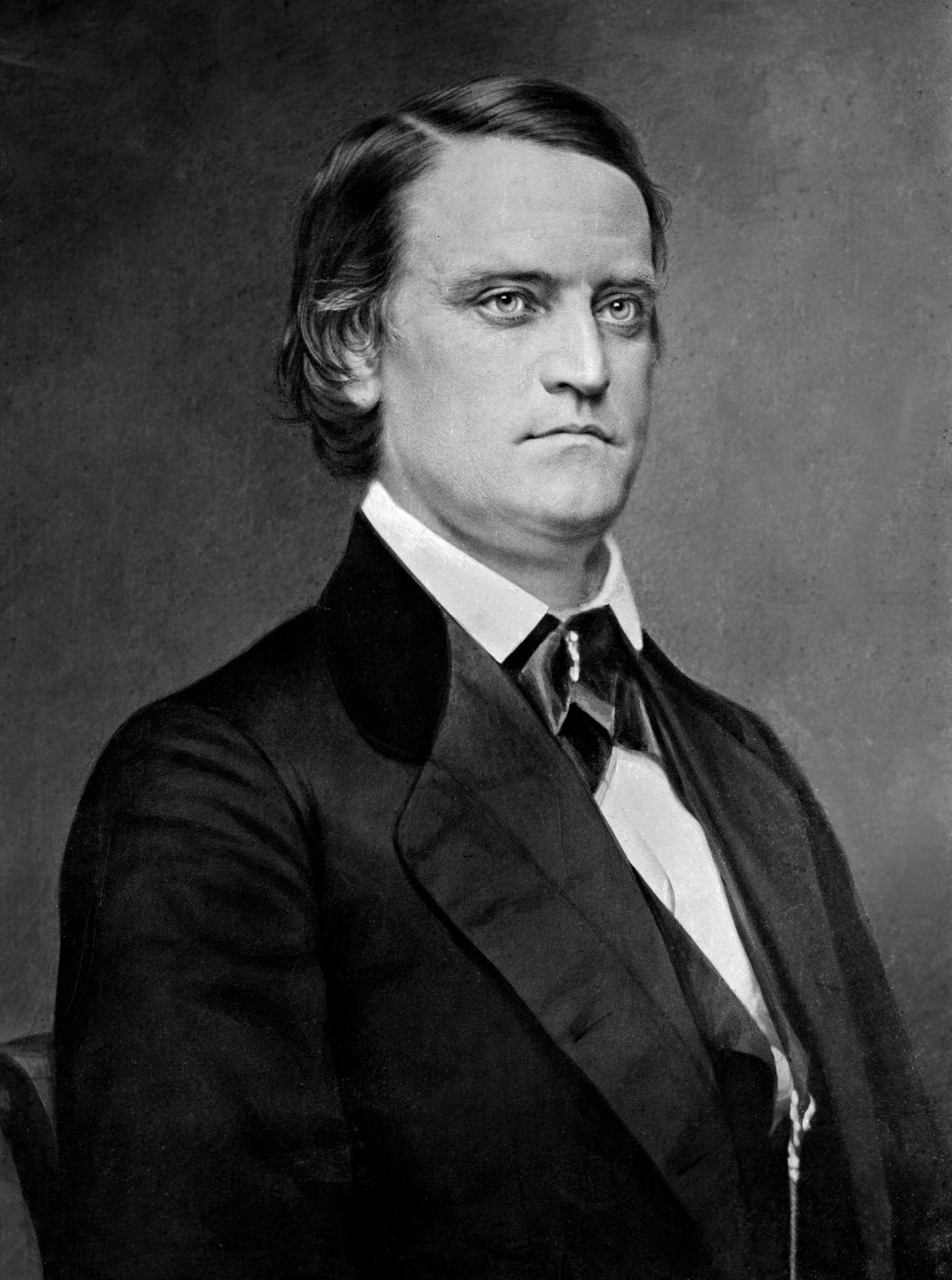

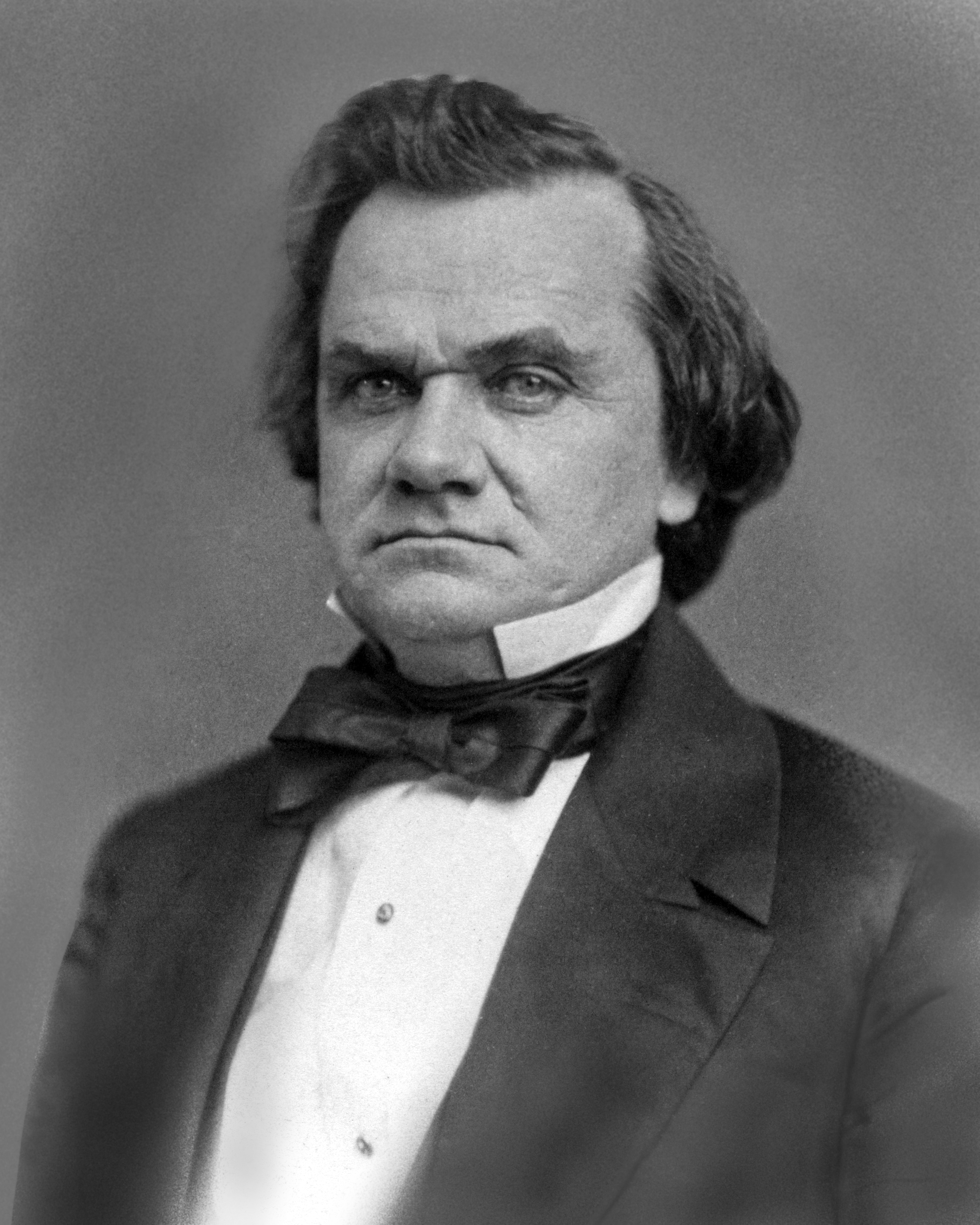
Nominee	John Bell	John C. Breckinridge	Stephen A. Douglas
Party	Constitutional Union	Southern Democratic	Democratic
Home state	Tennessee	Kentucky	Illinois
Running mate	Edward Everett	Joseph Lane	Herschel V. Johnson
Electoral vote	12	0	0
Popular vote	66,058	53,143	25,651
Percentage	45.18%	36.35%	17.54%
County results
Bell
30–40%
40–50%
50–60%
60–70%
70–80%
Breckinridge
40–50%
50–60%
60–70%
70–80%
80–90%
90–100%
Douglas
30–40%
40–50%
50–60%
President before election
James Buchanan
Democratic
Elected President
Abraham Lincoln
Republican

The 1860 United States presidential election in Kentucky took place on November 6, 1860, as part of the 1860 United States presidential election. Kentucky voters chose 12 representatives, or electors, to the Electoral College, who voted for president and vice president.

Kentucky was won by the Constitutional Union nominee Senator John Bell of Tennessee and his running mate Governor of Massachusetts Edward Everett. They defeated the Southern Democratic nominee Vice President of the United States and Kentucky native John C. Breckinridge and his running mate Senator Joseph Lane of Oregon as well as Democratic nominee 15th Senator Stephen A. Douglas of Illinois and his running mate 41st Governor of Georgia Herschel V. Johnson, with 17.54% of the popular vote. Bell won the state by a margin of 8.83%.

Despite Republican candidate and former Illinois representative Abraham Lincoln having been born and raised for the first five years of his life in Kentucky, he came in a distant fourth, failing to win 1% of the vote. Additionally, he failed to win LaRue County, the location of his birth. As of the 2024 presidential election, this is the last election in which Clay County and Owsley County voted for a Democratic candidate.

Lincoln's support came from German-Americans and the mountainous counties.

== Results ==
1860 United States presidential election in Kentucky
Party	Candidate	Votes	%
Constitutional Union	John Bell	66,058	45.18%
Southern Democratic	John C. Breckinridge	53,143	36.35%
Democratic	Stephen A. Douglas	25,651	17.54%
Republican	Abraham Lincoln	1,364	0.93%
Total votes		146,216	100%

=== Results By County ===
1860 United States Presidential Election in Kentucky (by county)
County	John Bell Constitutional Union		John C. Breckinridge Southern Democratic		Stephen A. Douglas Democratic		Abraham Lincoln Republican		Total votes cast
County	#	%	#	%	#	%	#	%	Total votes cast
Adair	403	36.40%	348	31.44%	355	32.07%	1	0.09%	1,107
Allen	507	44.47%	229	20.09%	404	35.44%	0	0.00%	1,140
Anderson	296	26.96%	670	61.02%	132	12.02%	0	0.00%	1,098
Ballard	481	39.92%	452	37.51%	271	22.49%	1	0.08%	1,205
Barren	1,086	57.74%	289	15.36%	492	26.16%	14	0.74%	1,881
Bath	694	40.47%	878	51.20%	143	8.34%	0	0.00%	1,715
Boone	881	47.65%	739	39.97%	228	12.33%	1	0.05%	1,849
Bourbon	966	55.11%	755	43.07%	29	1.65%	3	0.17%	1,753
Boyd	488	60.10%	191	23.52%	115	14.16%	18	2.22%	812
Boyle	697	64.36%	331	30.56%	52	4.80%	3	0.28%	1,083
Bracken	881	49.63%	644	36.28%	246	13.86%	4	0.23%	1,775
Breathitt	113	19.72%	459	80.10%	1	0.17%	0	0.00%	573
Breckinridge	956	58.94%	281	17.32%	382	23.55%	3	0.18%	1,622
Bullitt	451	45.42%	96	9.67%	444	44.71%	2	0.20%	993
Butler	500	52.91%	119	12.59%	321	33.97%	5	0.53%	945
Caldwell	446	40.00%	618	55.43%	48	4.30%	3	0.27%	1,115
Calloway	274	21.14%	904	69.75%	118	9.10%	0	0.00%	1,296
Campbell	854	32.25%	520	19.64%	960	36.25%	314	11.86%	2,648
Carroll	436	40.45%	572	53.06%	70	6.49%	0	0.00%	1,078
Carter	301	28.29%	616	57.89%	146	13.72%	1	0.09%	1,064
Casey	541	58.36%	176	18.99%	202	21.79%	8	0.86%	927
Christian	954	52.05%	411	22.42%	467	25.48%	1	0.05%	1,833
Clark	959	67.97%	391	27.71%	60	4.25%	1	0.07%	1,411
Clay	341	42.31%	353	43.80%	108	13.40%	4	0.50%	806
Clinton	261	36.71%	192	27.00%	255	35.86%	3	0.42%	711
Crittenden	553	44.20%	630	50.36%	67	5.36%	1	0.08%	1,251
Cumberland	584	67.51%	82	9.48%	192	22.20%	7	0.81%	865
Daviess	1,074	47.42%	654	28.87%	530	23.40%	7	0.31%	2,265
Edmonson	185	35.85%	179	34.69%	137	26.55%	15	2.91%	516
Estill	433	42.45%	512	50.20%	19	1.86%	56	5.49%	1,020
Fayette	1,411	54.99%	1,051	40.96%	99	3.86%	5	0.19%	2,566
Fleming	907	49.40%	827	45.04%	100	5.45%	2	0.11%	1,836
Floyd	64	9.51%	609	90.49%	0	0.00%	0	0.00%	673
Franklin	790	45.56%	907	52.31%	37	2.13%	0	0.00%	1,734
Fulton	300	42.02%	307	43.00%	107	14.99%	0	0.00%	714
Gallatin	383	45.76%	420	50.18%	34	4.06%	0	0.00%	837
Garrard	730	66.91%	195	17.87%	145	13.29%	21	1.92%	1,091
Grant	677	45.19%	709	47.33%	112	7.48%	0	0.00%	1,498
Graves	660	32.59%	1,225	60.49%	140	6.91%	0	0.00%	2,025
Grayson	497	44.73%	387	34.83%	219	19.71%	8	0.72%	1,111
Green	420	42.99%	367	37.56%	188	19.24%	2	0.20%	977
Greenup	795	64.22%	350	28.27%	89	7.19%	4	0.32%	1,238
Hancock	397	44.51%	427	47.87%	65	7.29%	3	0.34%	892
Hardin	1,029	49.21%	144	6.89%	912	43.62%	6	0.29%	2,091
Harlan	329	54.92%	264	44.07%	4	0.67%	2	0.33%	599
Harrison	960	41.20%	1,272	54.59%	98	4.21%	0	0.00%	2,330
Hart	535	37.15%	153	10.63%	751	52.15%	1	0.07%	1,440
Henderson	846	54.23%	498	31.92%	211	13.53%	5	0.32%	1,560
Henry	672	36.58%	773	42.08%	390	21.23%	2	0.11%	1,837
Hickman	284	29.31%	618	63.78%	66	6.81%	1	0.10%	969
Hopkins	731	46.56%	666	42.42%	171	10.89%	2	0.13%	1,570
Jackson	140	35.90%	136	34.87%	13	3.33%	101	25.90%	390
Jefferson	4,896	51.19%	1,122	11.73%	3,441	35.97%	106	1.11%	9,565
Jessamine	603	50.17%	559	46.51%	37	3.08%	3	0.25%	1,202
Johnson	22	3.30%	618	92.79%	26	3.90%	0	0.00%	666
Kenton	1,327	37.32%	650	18.28%	1,312	36.90%	267	7.51%	3,556
Knox	579	66.02%	211	24.06%	76	8.67%	11	1.25%	877
LaRue	401	45.26%	32	3.61%	450	50.79%	3	0.34%	886
Laurel	385	49.81%	370	47.87%	8	1.03%	10	1.29%	773
Lawrence	433	45.20%	515	53.76%	10	1.04%	0	0.00%	958
Letcher	91	24.40%	281	75.34%	1	0.27%	0	0.00%	373
Lewis	506	45.54%	501	45.09%	73	6.57%	31	2.79%	1,111
Lincoln	743	61.97%	380	31.69%	72	6.01%	4	0.33%	1,199
Livingston	460	50.77%	350	38.63%	96	10.60%	0	0.00%	906
Logan	1,490	74.35%	169	8.43%	342	17.07%	3	0.15%	2,004
Lyon	304	40.75%	431	57.77%	11	1.47%	0	0.00%	746
Madison	1,038	49.59%	914	43.67%	56	2.68%	85	4.06%	2,093
Magoffin	173	35.45%	311	63.73%	4	0.82%	0	0.00%	488
Marion	475	28.61%	281	16.93%	904	54.46%	0	0.00%	1,660
Marshall	176	16.30%	797	73.80%	107	9.91%	0	0.00%	1,080
Mason	1,305	54.90%	799	33.61%	247	10.39%	26	1.09%	2,377
McCracken	710	57.17%	244	19.65%	280	22.54%	8	0.64%	1,242
McLean	242	45.15%	132	24.63%	162	30.22%	0	0.00%	536
Meade	664	59.18%	152	13.55%	305	27.18%	1	0.09%	1,122
Mercer	608	33.30%	992	54.33%	224	12.27%	2	0.11%	1,826
Metcalfe	527	65.79%	34	4.24%	237	29.59%	3	0.37%	801
Monroe	494	51.30%	324	33.64%	142	14.75%	3	0.31%	963
Montgomery	540	50.09%	489	45.36%	49	4.55%	0	0.00%	1,078
Morgan	189	19.59%	776	80.41%	0	0.00%	0	0.00%	965
Muhlenberg	741	54.77%	51	3.77%	557	41.17%	4	0.30%	1,353
Nelson	609	38.47%	333	21.04%	641	40.49%	0	0.00%	1,583
Nicholas	690	40.47%	988	57.95%	26	1.52%	1	0.06%	1,705
Ohio	677	46.31%	201	13.75%	582	39.81%	2	0.14%	1,462
Oldham	372	39.74%	299	31.94%	263	28.10%	2	0.21%	936
Owen	539	23.01%	1,760	75.15%	43	1.84%	0	0.00%	2,342
Owsley	330	46.74%	370	52.41%	5	0.71%	1	0.14%	706
Pendleton	758	42.16%	807	44.88%	231	12.85%	2	0.11%	1,798
Perry	128	30.12%	293	68.94%	3	0.71%	1	0.47%	425
Pike	73	9.11%	726	90.64%	1	0.12%	1	0.12%	801
Powell	161	46.13%	184	52.72%	4	1.15%	0	0.00%	349
Pulaski	877	42.04%	1,098	52.64%	56	2.68%	55	2.64%	2,086
Rockcastle	374	53.13%	257	36.51%	9	1.28%	64	9.09%	704
Rowan	121	36.34%	189	56.76%	23	6.91%	0	0.00%	333
Russell	427	55.10%	299	38.58%	48	6.19%	1	0.13%	775
Scott	734	37.56%	1,176	60.18%	44	2.25%	0	0.00%	1,954
Shelby	1,176	58.86%	594	29.73%	228	11.41%	0	0.00%	1,998
Simpson	404	44.06%	319	34.79%	194	21.16%	0	0.00%	917
Spencer	334	45.63%	94	12.84%	304	41.53%	0	0.00%	732
Taylor	312	33.88%	151	16.40%	457	49.62%	1	0.11%	921
Todd	642	60.17%	274	25.68%	147	13.78%	4	0.37%	1,067
Trigg	623	43.05%	646	44.64%	177	12.23%	1	0.07%	1,447
Trimble	258	27.92%	581	62.88%	84	9.09%	1	0.11%	924
Union	651	41.36%	464	29.48%	459	29.16%	0	0.00%	1,574
Warren	1,126	58.46%	182	9.45%	615	31.93%	3	0.16%	1,926
Washington	318	26.09%	290	23.79%	610	50.04%	1	0.08%	1,219
Wayne	603	46.03%	695	53.05%	7	0.53%	5	0.38%	1,310
Webster	205	21.44%	575	60.15%	176	18.41%	0	0.00%	956
Whitley	519	60.49%	318	37.06%	14	1.63%	7	0.82%	858
Wolfe	109	23.64%	352	76.36%	0	0.00%	0	0.00%	461
Woodford	633	52.93%	547	45.74%	16	1.34%	0	0.00%	1,196
Total	66,058	45.18%	53,143	36.35%	25,641	17.54%	1,364	0.93%	146,206

== See also ==
- United States presidential elections in Kentucky

== Works cited ==
- Abbott, Richard (1986). The Republican Party and the South, 1855-1877: The First Southern Strategy. University of North Carolina Press. ISBN 0807816809.
