= 1944 United States presidential election in Kentucky =

- November 7, 1944

All 11 Kentucky votes to the Electoral College

Nominee	Franklin D. Roosevelt	Thomas E. Dewey
Party	Democratic	Republican
Home state	New York	New York
Running mate	Harry S. Truman	John W. Bricker
Electoral vote	11	0
Popular vote	472,589	392,448
Percentage	54.45%	45.22%
County results
Roosevelt
50–60%
60–70%
70–80%
80–90%
Dewey
50–60%
60–70%
70–80%
80–90%
90–100%
President before election
Franklin D. Roosevelt
Democratic
Elected President
Franklin D. Roosevelt
Democratic

The 1944 United States presidential election in Kentucky took place on November 7, 1944, as part of the 1944 United States presidential election. Kentucky voters chose 11 representatives, or electors, to the Electoral College, who voted for president and vice president.

Kentucky was won by incumbent President Franklin D. Roosevelt (D–New York), running with Senator Harry S. Truman, with 54.45 percent of the popular vote, against Governor Thomas E. Dewey (R–New York), running with Governor John W. Bricker, with 45.22 percent of the popular vote.

== Results ==
1944 United States presidential election in Kentucky
Party	Candidate	Votes	%
Democratic	Franklin D. Roosevelt (inc.)	472,589	54.45%
Republican	Thomas E. Dewey	392,448	45.22%
Prohibition	Claude A. Watson	2,023	0.23%
Socialist	Norman Thomas	535	0.06%
Socialist Labor	Edward A. Teichert	326	0.04%
Total votes		867,921	100%

=== Results by county ===
County	Franklin Delano Roosevelt Democratic		Thomas Edmund Dewey Republican		Various candidates Other parties		Margin		Total votes cast
County	#	%	#	%	#	%	#	%	Total votes cast
Adair	2,411	41.23%	3,414	58.39%	22	0.38%	-1,003	-17.15%	5,847
Allen	1,742	35.65%	3,120	63.86%	24	0.49%	-1,378	-28.20%	4,886
Anderson	2,148	60.02%	1,409	39.37%	22	0.61%	739	20.65%	3,579
Ballard	2,845	81.50%	637	18.25%	9	0.26%	2,208	63.25%	3,491
Barren	4,439	57.64%	3,262	42.36%	0	0.00%	1,177	15.28%	7,701
Bath	2,184	57.88%	1,581	41.90%	8	0.21%	603	15.98%	3,773
Bell	4,616	48.72%	4,822	50.90%	36	0.38%	-206	-2.17%	9,474
Boone	2,451	62.51%	1,457	37.16%	13	0.33%	994	25.35%	3,921
Bourbon	3,828	65.97%	1,957	33.72%	18	0.31%	1,871	32.24%	5,803
Boyd	8,130	54.06%	6,868	45.66%	42	0.28%	1,262	8.39%	15,040
Boyle	3,490	61.02%	2,195	38.38%	34	0.59%	1,295	22.64%	5,719
Bracken	1,915	56.04%	1,483	43.40%	19	0.56%	432	12.64%	3,417
Breathitt	2,922	69.85%	1,230	29.40%	31	0.74%	1,692	40.45%	4,183
Breckinridge	2,889	46.46%	3,292	52.94%	37	0.60%	-403	-6.48%	6,218
Bullitt	2,092	70.30%	876	29.44%	8	0.27%	1,216	40.86%	2,976
Butler	1,153	25.54%	3,354	74.30%	7	0.16%	-2,201	-48.76%	4,514
Caldwell	2,444	52.04%	2,242	47.74%	10	0.21%	202	4.30%	4,696
Calloway	4,888	81.12%	1,121	18.60%	17	0.28%	3,767	62.51%	6,026
Campbell	12,959	48.59%	13,647	51.17%	64	0.24%	-688	-2.58%	26,670
Carlisle	2,057	80.10%	505	19.67%	6	0.23%	1,552	60.44%	2,568
Carroll	2,662	77.65%	755	22.02%	11	0.32%	1,907	55.63%	3,428
Carter	2,733	39.84%	4,117	60.01%	10	0.15%	-1,384	-20.17%	6,860
Casey	1,520	28.10%	3,869	71.53%	20	0.37%	-2,349	-43.43%	5,409
Christian	6,260	57.96%	4,506	41.72%	35	0.32%	1,754	16.24%	10,801
Clark	3,608	64.85%	1,929	34.67%	27	0.49%	1,679	30.18%	5,564
Clay	1,185	21.57%	4,307	78.38%	3	0.05%	-3,122	-56.82%	5,495
Clinton	564	17.71%	2,618	82.20%	3	0.09%	-2,054	-64.49%	3,185
Crittenden	1,544	36.25%	2,690	63.16%	25	0.59%	-1,146	-26.91%	4,259
Cumberland	717	21.43%	2,619	78.27%	10	0.30%	-1,902	-56.84%	3,346
Daviess	8,143	56.73%	6,135	42.74%	77	0.54%	2,008	13.99%	14,355
Edmonson	1,016	29.38%	2,433	70.36%	9	0.26%	-1,417	-40.98%	3,458
Elliott	1,721	77.00%	514	23.00%	0	0.00%	1,207	54.00%	2,235
Estill	2,000	44.28%	2,493	55.19%	24	0.53%	-493	-10.91%	4,517
Fayette	13,567	55.15%	10,857	44.14%	174	0.71%	2,710	11.02%	24,598
Fleming	2,612	49.36%	2,666	50.38%	14	0.26%	-54	-1.02%	5,292
Floyd	7,729	70.74%	3,197	29.26%	0	0.00%	4,532	41.48%	10,926
Franklin	6,356	75.24%	2,050	24.27%	42	0.50%	4,306	50.97%	8,448
Fulton	2,973	81.68%	654	17.97%	13	0.36%	2,319	63.71%	3,640
Gallatin	1,360	72.03%	516	27.33%	12	0.64%	844	44.70%	1,888
Garrard	1,764	46.18%	2,042	53.46%	14	0.37%	-278	-7.28%	3,820
Grant	2,413	59.62%	1,621	40.05%	13	0.32%	792	19.57%	4,047
Graves	8,057	78.70%	2,172	21.22%	9	0.09%	5,885	57.48%	10,238
Grayson	2,436	40.03%	3,629	59.64%	20	0.33%	-1,193	-19.61%	6,085
Green	1,809	42.88%	2,379	56.39%	31	0.73%	-570	-13.51%	4,219
Greenup	3,821	50.66%	3,718	49.30%	3	0.04%	103	1.37%	7,542
Hancock	1,129	45.00%	1,365	54.40%	15	0.60%	-236	-9.41%	2,509
Hardin	4,436	60.82%	2,831	38.81%	27	0.37%	1,605	22.00%	7,294
Harlan	8,000	57.81%	5,815	42.02%	23	0.17%	2,185	15.79%	13,838
Harrison	3,706	71.38%	1,466	28.24%	20	0.39%	2,240	43.14%	5,192
Hart	3,138	50.93%	3,014	48.91%	10	0.16%	124	2.01%	6,162
Henderson	5,887	68.49%	2,683	31.22%	25	0.29%	3,204	37.28%	8,595
Henry	3,548	70.08%	1,497	29.57%	18	0.36%	2,051	40.51%	5,063
Hickman	2,005	77.06%	588	22.60%	9	0.35%	1,417	54.46%	2,602
Hopkins	7,352	65.80%	3,795	33.96%	27	0.24%	3,557	31.83%	11,174
Jackson	328	8.39%	3,578	91.56%	2	0.05%	-3,250	-83.16%	3,908
Jefferson	80,236	56.66%	60,905	43.01%	480	0.34%	19,331	13.65%	141,621
Jessamine	2,426	57.11%	1,790	42.14%	32	0.75%	636	14.97%	4,248
Johnson	2,222	32.32%	4,642	67.53%	10	0.15%	-2,420	-35.21%	6,874
Kenton	17,524	57.96%	12,654	41.85%	58	0.19%	4,870	16.11%	30,236
Knott	3,867	82.81%	803	17.19%	0	0.00%	3,064	65.61%	4,670
Knox	2,385	31.51%	5,178	68.40%	7	0.09%	-2,793	-36.90%	7,570
Larue	2,065	56.72%	1,550	42.57%	26	0.71%	515	14.14%	3,641
Laurel	2,104	29.39%	5,051	70.54%	5	0.07%	-2,947	-41.16%	7,160
Lawrence	2,408	46.89%	2,715	52.87%	12	0.23%	-307	-5.98%	5,135
Lee	1,072	42.04%	1,468	57.57%	10	0.39%	-396	-15.53%	2,550
Leslie	499	15.70%	2,679	84.30%	0	0.00%	-2,180	-68.60%	3,178
Letcher	4,599	53.04%	4,055	46.77%	16	0.18%	544	6.27%	8,670
Lewis	1,434	30.40%	3,275	69.43%	8	0.17%	-1,841	-39.03%	4,717
Lincoln	3,087	52.13%	2,793	47.16%	42	0.71%	294	4.96%	5,922
Livingston	1,686	58.30%	1,202	41.56%	4	0.14%	484	16.74%	2,892
Logan	5,110	69.63%	2,211	30.13%	18	0.25%	2,899	39.50%	7,339
Lyon	1,743	65.06%	924	34.49%	12	0.45%	819	30.57%	2,679
Madison	5,769	51.02%	5,468	48.36%	70	0.62%	301	2.66%	11,307
Magoffin	2,031	48.75%	2,135	51.25%	0	0.00%	-104	-2.50%	4,166
Marion	2,996	63.83%	1,673	35.64%	25	0.53%	1,323	28.18%	4,694
Marshall	2,947	68.95%	1,316	30.79%	11	0.26%	1,631	38.16%	4,274
Martin	571	21.64%	2,067	78.33%	1	0.04%	-1,496	-56.69%	2,639
Mason	3,810	53.62%	3,256	45.83%	39	0.55%	554	7.80%	7,105
McCracken	10,846	71.73%	4,190	27.71%	84	0.56%	6,656	44.02%	15,120
McCreary	880	20.46%	3,419	79.49%	2	0.05%	-2,539	-59.03%	4,301
McLean	2,222	55.59%	1,752	43.83%	23	0.58%	470	11.76%	3,997
Meade	1,828	63.47%	1,040	36.11%	12	0.42%	788	27.36%	2,880
Menifee	976	63.09%	568	36.72%	3	0.19%	408	26.37%	1,547
Mercer	3,086	59.97%	2,039	39.62%	21	0.41%	1,047	20.35%	5,146
Metcalfe	1,694	42.22%	2,306	57.48%	12	0.30%	-612	-15.25%	4,012
Monroe	1,101	23.18%	3,648	76.82%	0	0.00%	-2,547	-53.63%	4,749
Montgomery	2,334	61.05%	1,481	38.74%	8	0.21%	853	22.31%	3,823
Morgan	3,242	72.63%	1,217	27.26%	5	0.11%	2,025	45.36%	4,464
Muhlenberg	3,657	44.04%	4,618	55.61%	29	0.35%	-961	-11.57%	8,304
Nelson	3,648	62.78%	2,136	36.76%	27	0.46%	1,512	26.02%	5,811
Nicholas	1,813	62.84%	1,059	36.71%	13	0.45%	754	26.14%	2,885
Ohio	3,131	40.89%	4,494	58.69%	32	0.42%	-1,363	-17.80%	7,657
Oldham	1,908	64.74%	1,021	34.65%	18	0.61%	887	30.10%	2,947
Owen	3,157	83.08%	627	16.50%	16	0.42%	2,530	66.58%	3,800
Owsley	325	13.77%	2,033	86.11%	3	0.13%	-1,708	-72.34%	2,361
Pendleton	2,096	51.25%	1,977	48.34%	17	0.42%	119	2.91%	4,090
Perry	5,527	56.04%	4,333	43.94%	2	0.02%	1,194	12.11%	9,862
Pike	9,757	54.52%	8,092	45.21%	48	0.27%	1,665	9.30%	17,897
Powell	1,023	52.98%	902	46.71%	6	0.31%	121	6.27%	1,931
Pulaski	3,934	31.91%	8,318	67.47%	76	0.62%	-4,384	-35.56%	12,328
Robertson	855	60.51%	556	39.35%	2	0.14%	299	21.16%	1,413
Rockcastle	1,327	25.84%	3,802	74.03%	7	0.14%	-2,475	-48.19%	5,136
Rowan	1,944	51.51%	1,815	48.09%	15	0.40%	129	3.42%	3,774
Russell	1,185	28.09%	3,019	71.56%	15	0.36%	-1,834	-43.47%	4,219
Scott	3,627	69.11%	1,589	30.28%	32	0.61%	2,038	38.83%	5,248
Shelby	4,415	68.49%	1,997	30.98%	34	0.53%	2,418	37.51%	6,446
Simpson	2,821	73.27%	1,012	26.29%	17	0.44%	1,809	46.99%	3,850
Spencer	1,443	68.85%	646	30.82%	7	0.33%	797	38.02%	2,096
Taylor	2,475	48.19%	2,622	51.05%	39	0.76%	-147	-2.86%	5,136
Todd	2,990	68.36%	1,363	31.16%	21	0.48%	1,627	37.20%	4,374
Trigg	2,511	65.10%	1,332	34.53%	14	0.36%	1,179	30.57%	3,857
Trimble	1,916	86.70%	264	11.95%	30	1.36%	1,652	74.75%	2,210
Union	3,489	78.65%	935	21.08%	12	0.27%	2,554	57.57%	4,436
Warren	7,528	60.18%	4,944	39.52%	37	0.30%	2,584	20.66%	12,509
Washington	2,283	49.05%	2,353	50.56%	18	0.39%	-70	-1.50%	4,654
Wayne	2,022	39.88%	3,048	60.12%	0	0.00%	-1,026	-20.24%	5,070
Webster	3,324	64.06%	1,840	35.46%	25	0.48%	1,484	28.60%	5,189
Whitley	2,352	26.94%	6,378	73.05%	1	0.01%	-4,026	-46.11%	8,731
Wolfe	1,450	61.94%	889	37.98%	2	0.09%	561	23.96%	2,341
Woodford	2,154	60.81%	1,374	38.79%	14	0.40%	780	22.02%	3,542
Totals	472,589	54.45%	392,448	45.22%	2,887	0.33%	80,141	9.23%	867,924

==== Counties that flipped from Democratic to Republican ====
- Bell
- Breckinridge
- Fleming
- Garrard
- Lawrence
- Magoffin
- Washington
