= 1824 United States presidential election in Kentucky =

- October 26 – December 2, 1824
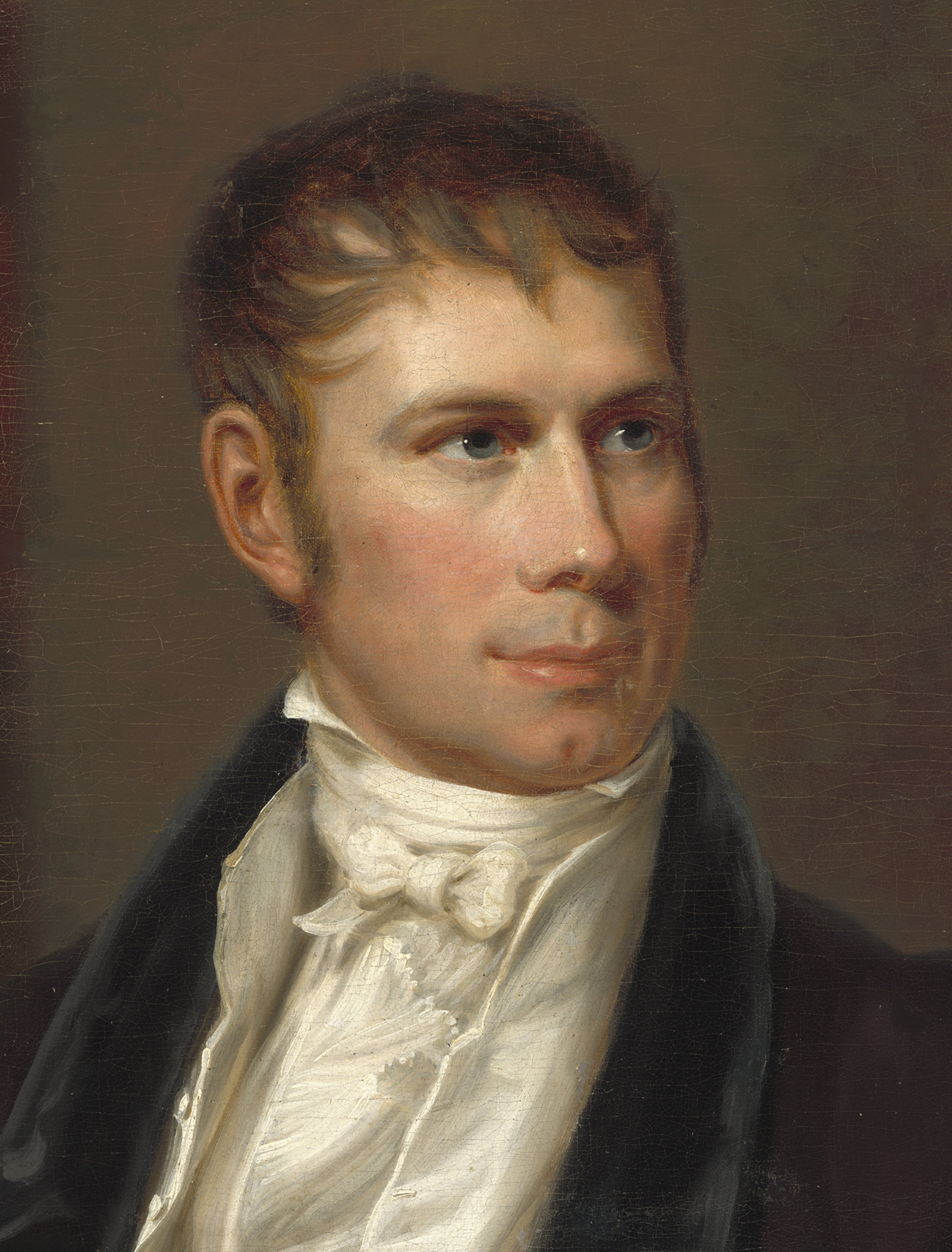

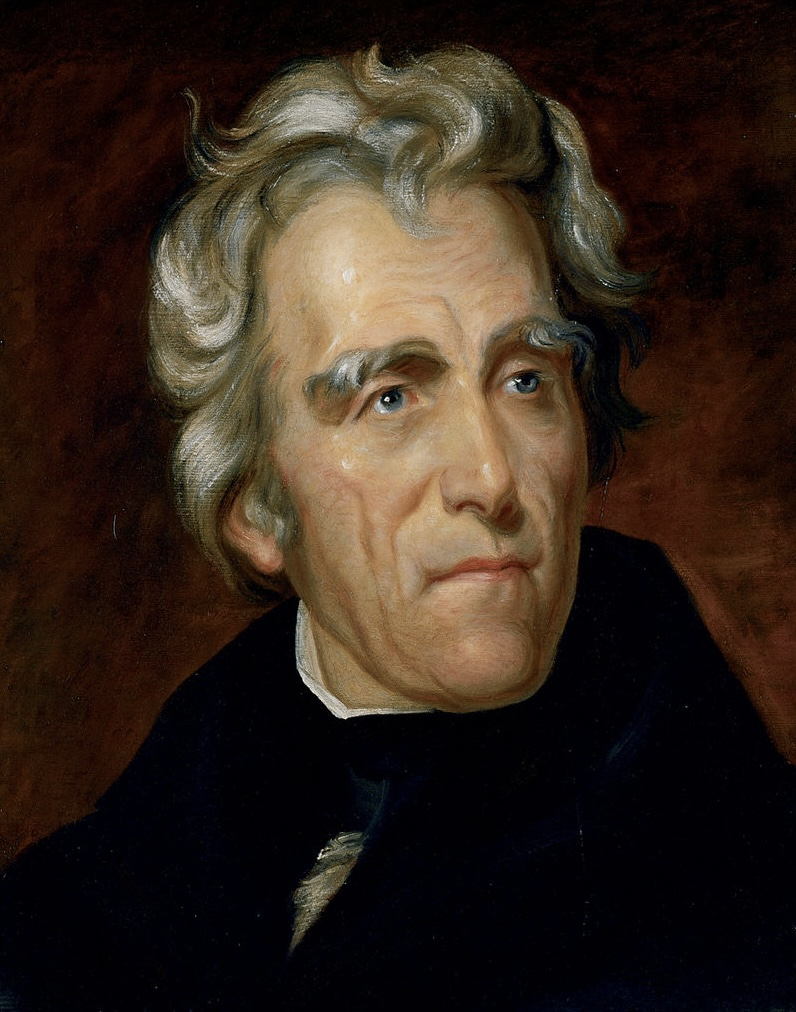
Nominee	Henry Clay	Andrew Jackson
Party	Democratic-Republican	Democratic-Republican
Home state	Kentucky	Tennessee
Running mate	Nathan Sanford	John C. Calhoun
Electoral vote	14	0
Popular vote	17,207	6,658
Percentage	71.73%	27.76%

Clay
50–60%
60–70%
70–80%
80–90%
90–100%
Jackson
50–60%
60–70%
70–80%
80–90%
90–100%

The 1824 United States presidential election in Kentucky took place between October 26 and December 2, 1824, as part of the 1824 United States presidential election. Voters chose 14 representatives, or electors to the Electoral College, who voted for President and Vice President.

During this election, the Democratic-Republican Party was the only major national party, and four different candidates from this party sought the presidency. Kentucky voted for Henry Clay over Andrew Jackson, John Quincy Adams, and William H. Crawford. Clay won Kentucky, his home state, by a wide margin of 43.46%.

Kentucky was divided into three electoral districts for this election, with electors chosen through block voting. District 1 elected four electors, while Districts 2 and 3 elected five electors each.

== Results ==
1824 United States presidential election in Kentucky
Party	Candidate	Votes	Percentage	Electoral votes
Democratic-Republican	Henry Clay	17,207	71.73%	14
Democratic-Republican	Andrew Jackson	6,658	27.76%	0
Democratic-Republican	John Quincy Adams	120	0.50%	0
Democratic-Republican	William H. Crawford	3	0.01%	0
Totals		23,988	100.0%	14

=== Results by electoral district ===
Results by District
District	Henry Clay Democratic-Republican			Andrew Jackson Democratic-Republican			John Quincy Adams Democratic-Republican			William H. Crawford Democratic-Republican			Margin		Total votes cast
District	#	%	Electors	#	%	Electors	#	%	Electors	#	%	Electors	#	%	Total votes cast
1	3,861	71.47%	4	1,473	27.27%	0	65	1.20%	0	3	0.06%	0	2,320	42.94%	5,402
2	6,165	69.46%	5	2,711	30.54%	0	no candidates			no ballots			3,454	38.92%	8,876
3	7,181	73.95%	5	2,474	25.48%	0	55	0.57%	0	no candidates			4,652	47.90%	9,710
Total	17,207	71.73%	14	6,658	27.76%	0	120	0.50%	0	3	0.01%	0	10,426	43.46%	23,988

== See also ==
- United States presidential elections in Kentucky
