= 1840 United States presidential election in Kentucky =

- November 2, 1840
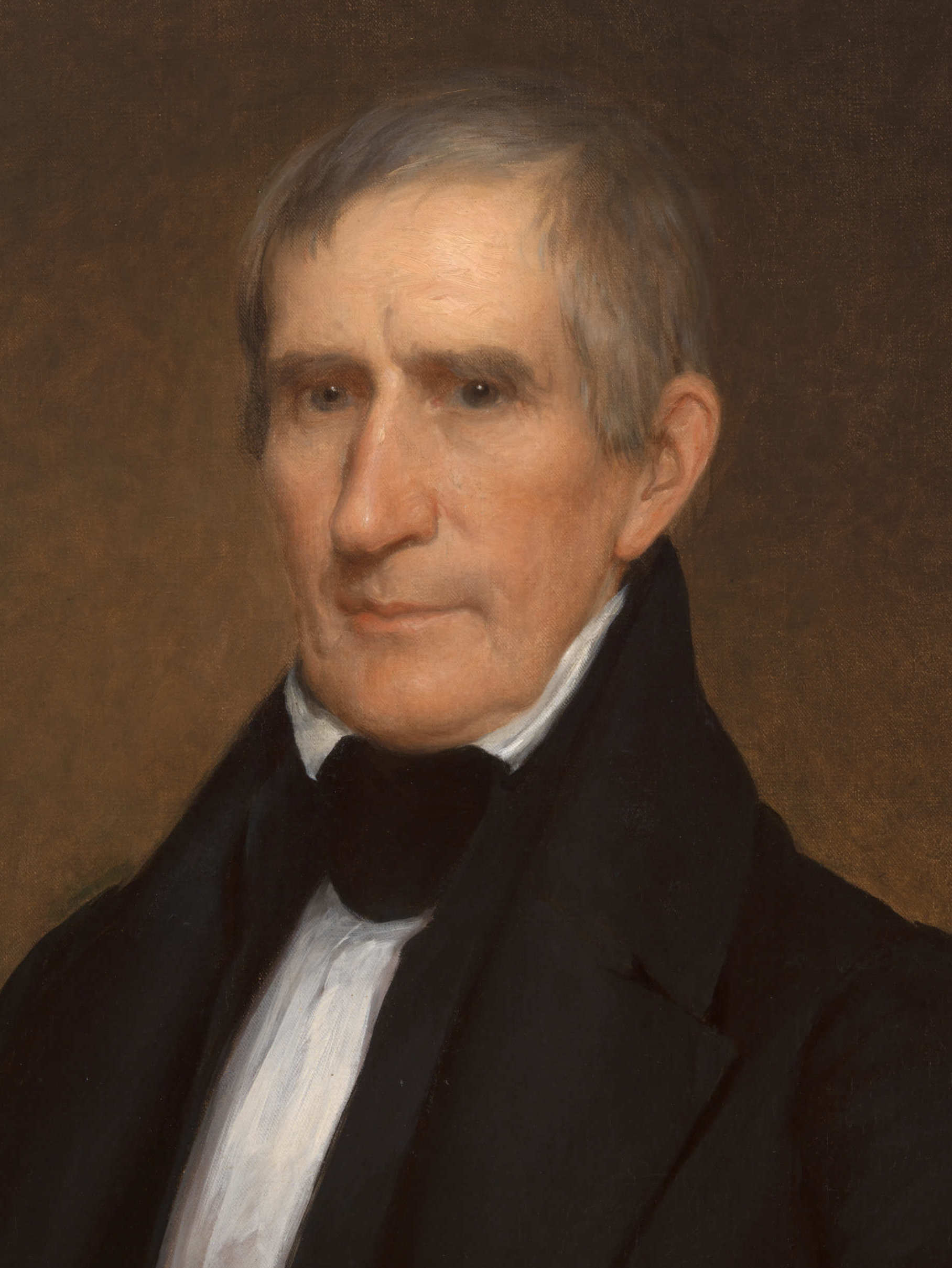

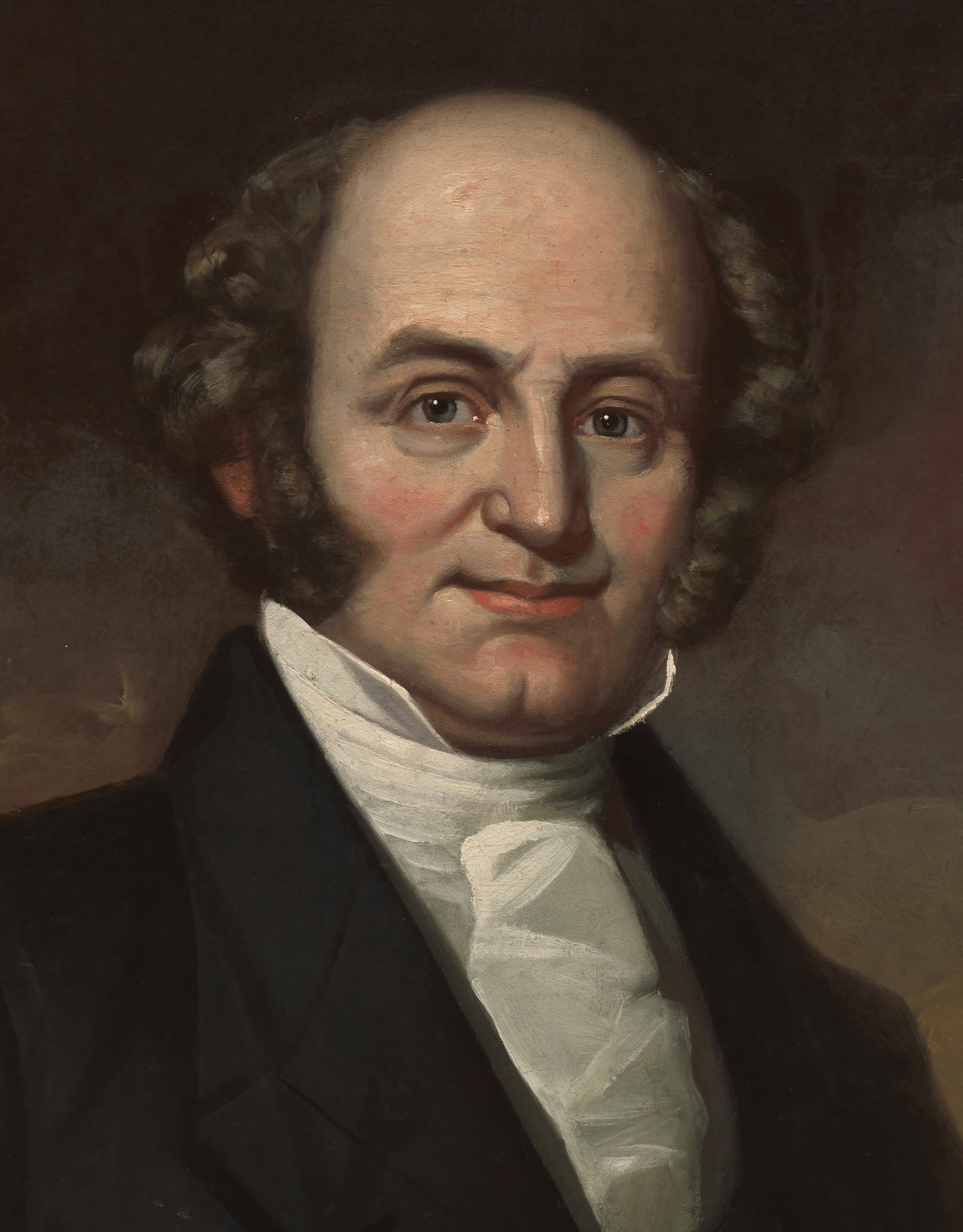
Nominee	William Henry Harrison	Martin Van Buren
Party	Whig	Democratic
Home state	Ohio	New York
Running mate	John Tyler	none
Electoral vote	15	0
Popular vote	58,488	32,616
Percentage	64.20%	35.80%
County results
Harrison
50–60%
60–70%
70–80%
80–90%
90–100%
Van Buren
50–60%
60–70%
70–80%
80–90%
President before election
Martin Van Buren
Democratic
Elected President
William Henry Harrison
Whig

The 1840 United States presidential election in Kentucky was held on November 2, 1840, as part of the 1840 United States presidential election. Voters chose 15 representatives, or electors to the Electoral College, who voted for President and Vice President.

Kentucky voted for the Whig candidate, William Henry Harrison, over Democratic candidate Martin Van Buren. Harrison won Kentucky by a margin of 28.4%.

With 64.20% of the popular vote, Kentucky would prove to be Harrison's strongest state in the 1840 election.

== Results ==
1840 United States presidential election in Kentucky
Party	Candidate	Running mate	Popular vote		Electoral vote	
Party	Candidate	Running mate	Count	%	Count	%
Whig	William Henry Harrison of Ohio	John Tyler of Virginia	58,488	64.20%	15	100.00%
Democratic	Martin Van Buren of New York	Richard Mentor Johnson of Kentucky	32,616	35.80%	0	0.00%
Total			91,104	100.00%	15	100.00%

== See also ==
- United States presidential elections in Kentucky
