= 1828 United States presidential election in Kentucky =

- October 31 – December 2, 1828

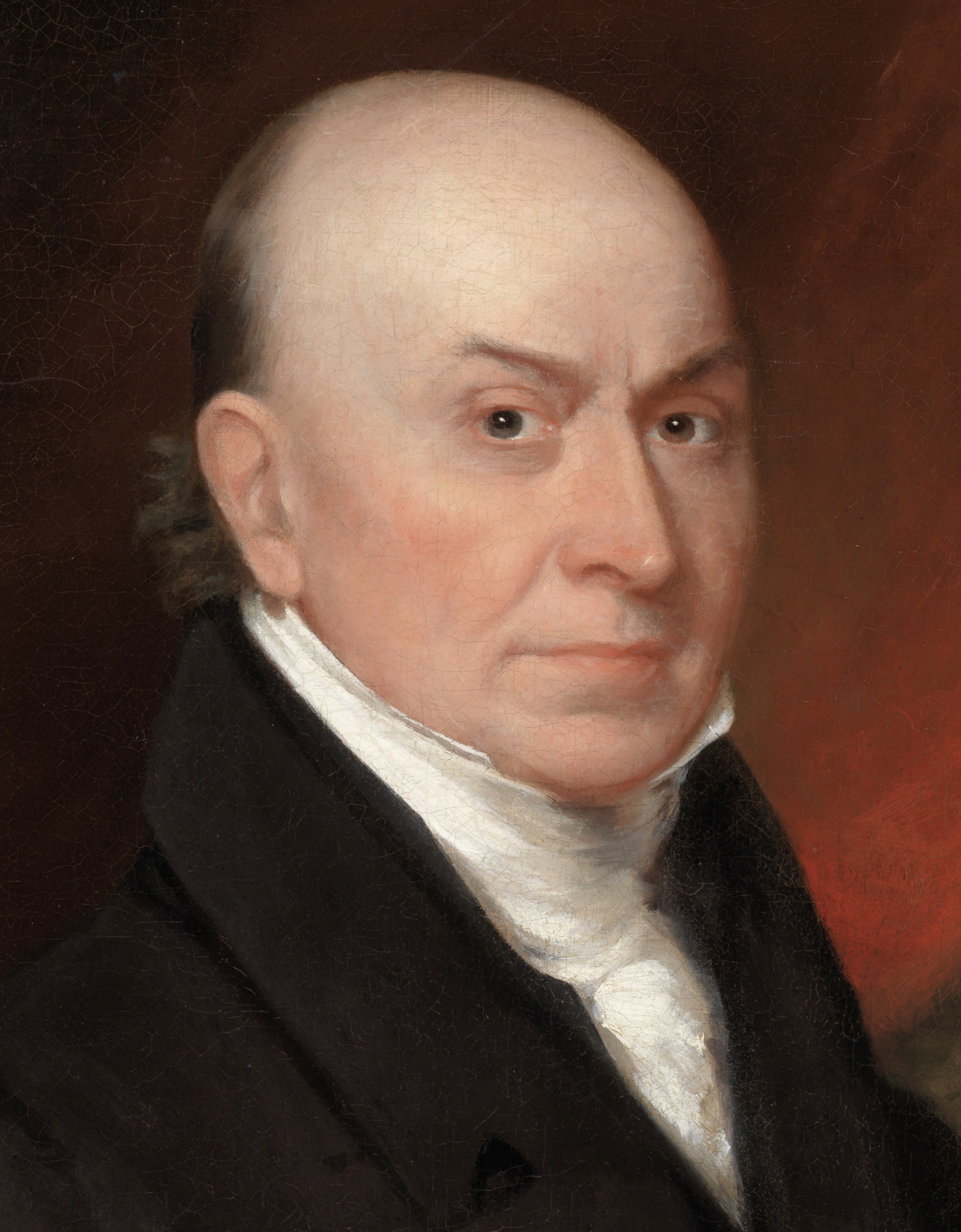
Nominee	Andrew Jackson	John Quincy Adams
Party	Democratic	National Republican
Home state	Tennessee	Massachusetts
Running mate	John C. Calhoun	Richard Rush
Electoral vote	14	0
Popular vote	39,308	31,468
Percentage	55.54%	44.46%
County results
Jackson
50–60%
60–70%
70–80%
80–90%
90–100%
Adams
50–60%
60–70%
70–80%
80–90%
Tie
50%

The 1828 United States presidential election in Kentucky took place between October 31 and December 2, 1828, as part of the 1828 United States presidential election. Voters chose 14 representatives, or electors to the Electoral College, who voted for President and Vice President.

Kentucky voted for the Democratic candidate, Andrew Jackson, over the National Republican candidate, John Quincy Adams. Jackson won Kentucky by a margin of 11.08%.

This would be the only time Democrats would win Kentucky until 1856, after the Whig Party had collapsed.

== Results ==
1828 United States presidential election in Kentucky
Party	Candidate	Votes	Percentage	Electoral votes
Democratic	Andrew Jackson	39,308	55.54%	14
National Republican	John Quincy Adams (incumbent)	31,468	44.46%	0
Totals		70,776	100.0%	14

== See also ==
- United States presidential elections in Kentucky
