= 1844 United States presidential election in Kentucky =

- November 4, 1844
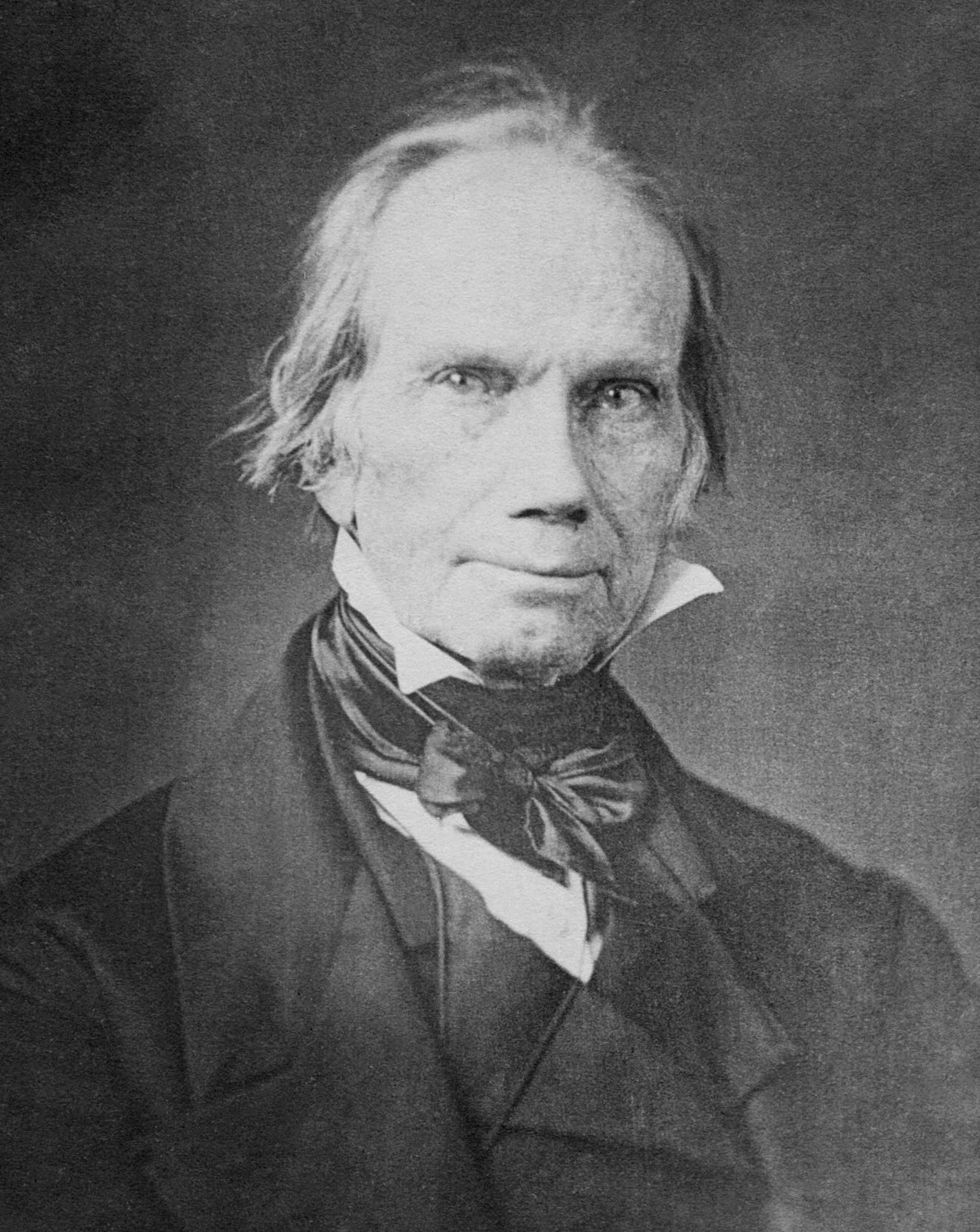

| Nominee | Henry Clay | James K. Polk |
| Party | Whig | Democratic |
| Home state | Kentucky | Tennessee |
| Running mate | Theodore Frelinghuysen | George M. Dallas |
| Electoral vote | 12 | 0 |
| Popular vote | 61,249 | 51,988 |
| Percentage | 54.09% | 45.91% |
County results
Clay
50–60%
60–70%
70–80%
80–90%
Polk
50–60%
60–70%
70–80%
80–90%
President before election
John Tyler
Independent
Elected President
James K. Polk
Democratic

The 1844 United States presidential election in Kentucky was held on November 4, 1844, as part of the 1844 United States presidential election. Voters chose 12 representatives, or electors to the Electoral College, who voted for President and Vice President.

Kentucky voted for the Whig candidate, Henry Clay, over Democratic candidate James K. Polk. Clay won his home state by a margin of 8.18%.

With 54.09% of the popular vote, Clay's home state would be his third strongest victory after Rhode Island and Vermont.

== Results ==
1844 United States presidential election in Kentucky
| Party | Candidate | Running mate | Popular vote | | Electoral vote | |
| Party | Candidate | Running mate | Count | % | Count | % |
|---|---|---|---|---|---|---|
| Whig | Henry Clay of Kentucky | Theodore Frelinghuysen of New York | 61,249 | 54.09% | 12 | 100.00% |
| Democratic | James K. Polk of Tennessee | George M. Dallas of Pennsylvania | 51,988 | 45.91% | 0 | 0.00% |
| Total | | | 113,237 | 100.00% | 12 | 100.00% |

== See also ==
- United States presidential elections in Kentucky
