= 1872 United States presidential election in Kentucky =

- November 5, 1872
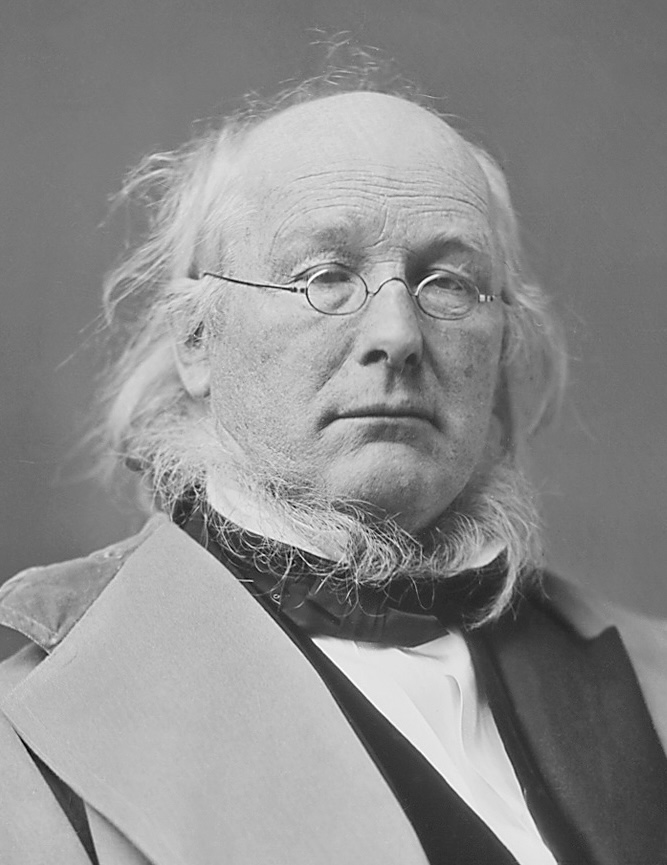

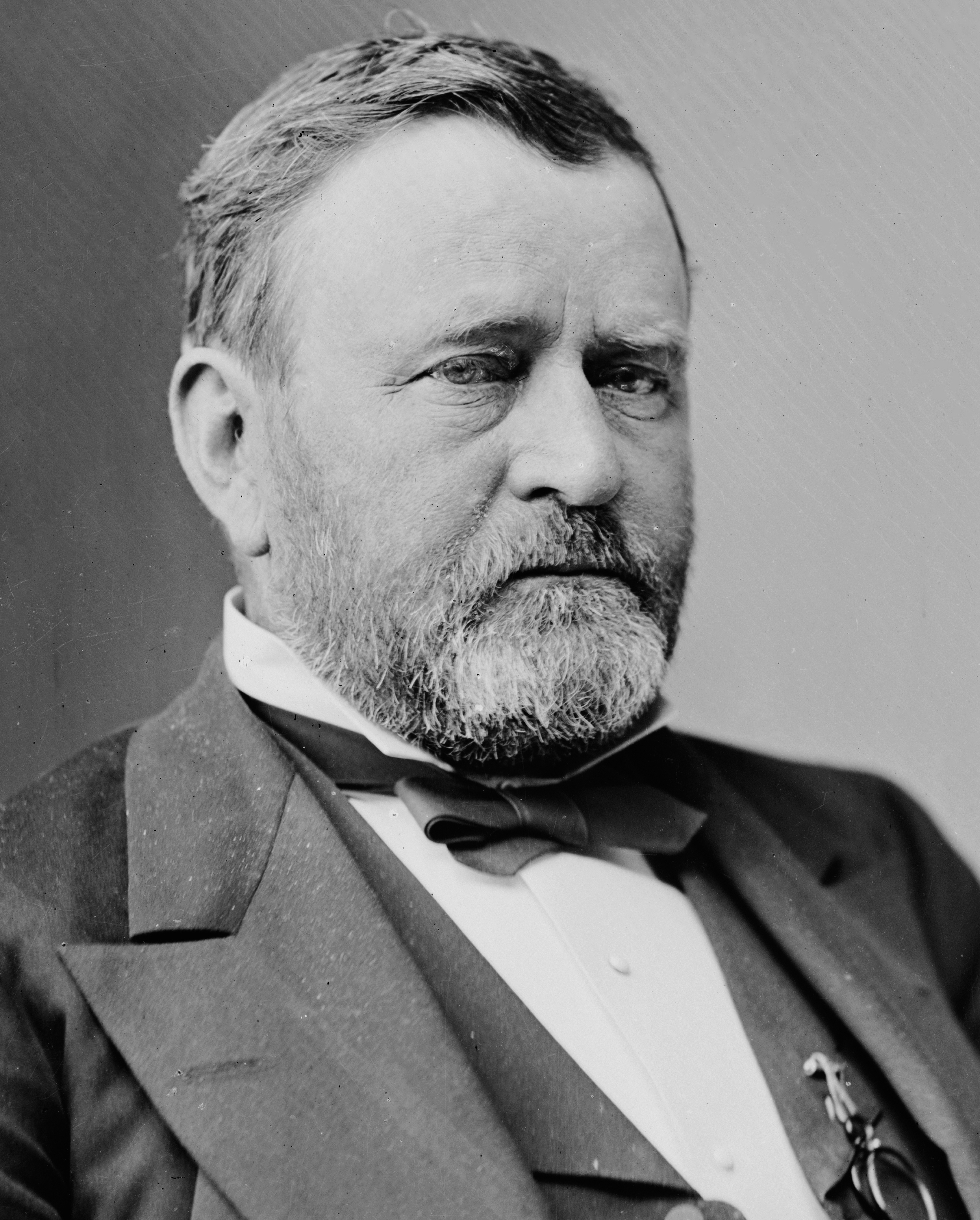

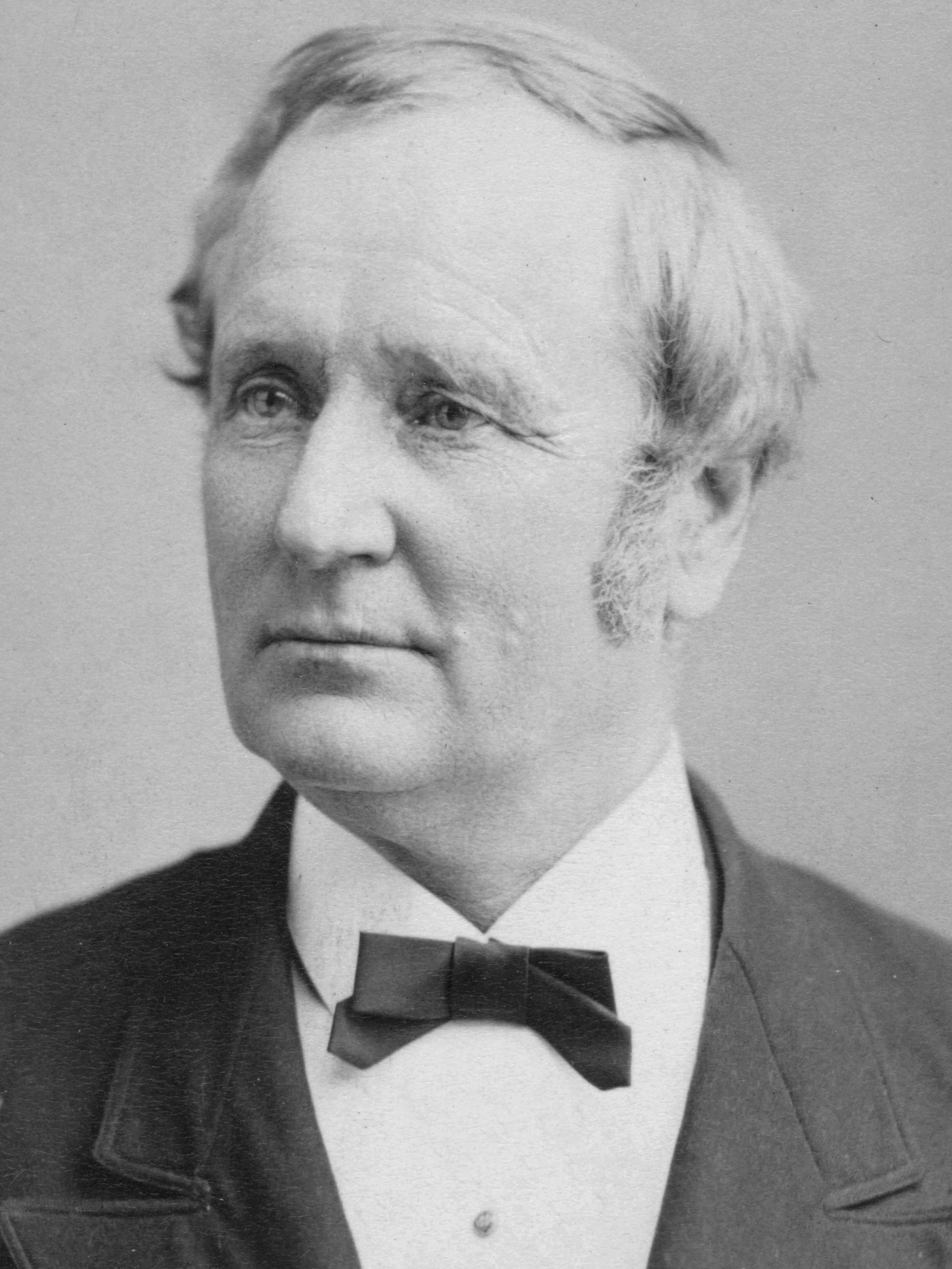

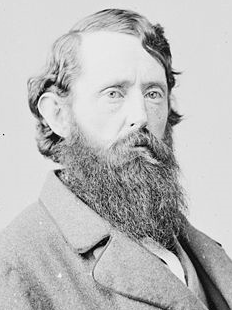
Nominee	Horace Greeley	Ulysses S. Grant
Party	Liberal Republican	Republican
Home state	New York	Illinois
Running mate	Benjamin G. Brown	Henry Wilson
Electoral vote	0 (Note: Greeley died after the election, but prior to the Electoral College meeting, and was thus ineligible for the office of President. Greeley had won 12 pledged electors, of which all cast their votes for other Democrats.)	0
Popular vote	99,995	88,766
Percentage	52.32%	46.44%
Nominee	Thomas A. Hendricks (Given electoral votes due to death of Greeley)	Benjamin Gratz Brown (Given electoral votes due to death of Greeley)
Party	Democratic	Liberal Republican
Home state	Indiana	Missouri
Electoral vote	8	4
County results
Greeley
40–50%
50–60%
60–70%
70–80%
80–90%
Grant
40–50%
50–60%
60–70%
70–80%
80–90%
President before election
Ulysses S. Grant
Republican
Elected President
Ulysses S. Grant
Republican

The 1872 United States presidential election in Kentucky took place on November 5, 1872, as part of the 1872 United States presidential election. Voters chose 12 representatives, or electors to the Electoral College, who voted for president and vice president.

Kentucky voted for the Liberal Republican candidate, Horace Greeley, over Republican candidate, Ulysses S. Grant. Greeley won Kentucky by a margin of 5.88%. However, Greeley died prior to the Electoral College meeting, meaning for Kentucky's 12 electors could vote for the candidate of their choice: eight voted for Indiana Senator Thomas A. Hendricks, while four voted for Greeley's running mate, Benjamin Gratz Brown.

This is the last time a Republican won two terms without ever carrying the state.

== Results ==
1872 United States presidential election in Kentucky
Party	Candidate	Running mate	Popular vote		Electoral vote	
Party	Candidate	Running mate	Count	%	Count	%
Democratic	Thomas A. Hendricks of Indiana	N/A of N/A	–	–	8	66.67%
Liberal Republican	Benjamin G. Brown of Missouri	N/A of N/A	–	–	4	33.33%
Liberal Republican	Horace Greeley of New York	Benjamin Gratz Brown of Missouri	99,995	52.32%	0	0.00%
Republican	Ulysses S. Grant of Illinois	Henry Wilson of Massachusetts	88,776	46.44%	0	0.00%
Straight-Out Democratic	Charles O'Conor	John Quincy Adams II	2,374	1.24%	0	0.00%
Total			191,135	100.00%	12	100.00%

== See also ==
- United States presidential elections in Kentucky
