= 1940 United States presidential election in Kentucky =

- November 5, 1940

All 11 Kentucky votes to the Electoral College

Nominee	Franklin D. Roosevelt	Wendell Willkie
Party	Democratic	Republican
Home state	New York	New York
Running mate	Henry A. Wallace	Charles L. McNary
Electoral vote	11	0
Popular vote	557,332	410,384
Percentage	57.45%	42.30%
County results
Roosevelt
50–60%
60–70%
70–80%
80–90%
Willkie
40–50%
50–60%
60–70%
70–80%
80–90%
President before election
Franklin D. Roosevelt
Democratic
Elected President
Franklin D. Roosevelt
Democratic

The 1940 United States presidential election in Kentucky took place on November 5, 1940, as part of the 1940 United States presidential election. Kentucky voters chose 11 representatives, or electors, to the Electoral College, who voted for president and vice president.

Kentucky was won by incumbent President Franklin D. Roosevelt (D–New York), running with Secretary Henry A. Wallace, with 57.45 percent of the popular vote, against Wendell Willkie (R–New York), running with Minority Leader Charles L. McNary, with 42.30 percent of the popular vote.

== Results ==
1940 United States presidential election in Kentucky
Party	Candidate	Votes	%
Democratic	Franklin D. Roosevelt (inc.)	557,322	57.45%
Republican	Wendell Willkie	410,384	42.30%
Prohibition	Roger Babson	1,443	0.15%
Socialist	Norman Thomas	1,014	0.10%
Total votes		970,163	100.00%

=== Results by county ===
County	Franklin Delano Roosevelt Democratic		Wendell Lewis Willkie Republican		Various candidates Other parties		Margin		Total votes cast
County	#	%	#	%	#	%	#	%	Total votes cast
Adair	2,711	42.37%	3,674	57.42%	13	0.20%	-963	-15.05%	6,398
Allen	2,036	38.49%	3,232	61.11%	21	0.40%	-1,196	-22.61%	5,289
Anderson	2,515	66.73%	1,244	33.01%	10	0.27%	1,271	33.72%	3,769
Ballard	3,212	80.89%	758	19.09%	1	0.03%	2,454	61.80%	3,971
Barren	4,888	60.11%	3,233	39.76%	11	0.14%	1,655	20.35%	8,132
Bath	2,528	60.54%	1,636	39.18%	12	0.29%	892	21.36%	4,176
Bell	5,910	54.23%	4,962	45.53%	27	0.25%	948	8.70%	10,899
Boone	2,518	64.76%	1,357	34.90%	13	0.33%	1,161	29.86%	3,888
Bourbon	4,254	61.38%	2,673	38.57%	4	0.06%	1,581	22.81%	6,931
Boyd	9,868	57.16%	7,322	42.41%	75	0.43%	2,546	14.75%	17,265
Boyle	4,081	64.28%	2,257	35.55%	11	0.17%	1,824	28.73%	6,349
Bracken	1,961	55.69%	1,551	44.05%	9	0.26%	410	11.64%	3,521
Breathitt	3,977	71.14%	1,602	28.66%	11	0.20%	2,375	42.49%	5,590
Breckinridge	3,296	50.01%	3,258	49.43%	37	0.56%	38	0.58%	6,591
Bullitt	2,388	74.46%	813	25.35%	6	0.19%	1,575	49.11%	3,207
Butler	1,455	31.47%	3,163	68.40%	6	0.13%	-1,708	-36.94%	4,624
Caldwell	2,858	55.71%	2,246	43.78%	26	0.51%	612	11.93%	5,130
Calloway	5,793	86.49%	896	13.38%	9	0.13%	4,897	73.11%	6,698
Campbell	14,801	49.63%	14,916	50.02%	103	0.35%	-115	-0.39%	29,820
Carlisle	2,366	82.21%	500	17.37%	12	0.42%	1,866	64.84%	2,878
Carroll	2,915	78.15%	804	21.55%	11	0.29%	2,111	56.60%	3,730
Carter	3,403	42.83%	4,520	56.88%	23	0.29%	-1,117	-14.06%	7,946
Casey	1,862	32.37%	3,874	67.34%	17	0.30%	-2,012	-34.97%	5,753
Christian	6,599	54.17%	5,566	45.69%	16	0.13%	1,033	8.48%	12,181
Clark	3,970	64.82%	2,136	34.87%	19	0.31%	1,834	29.94%	6,125
Clay	1,632	27.08%	4,395	72.92%	0	0.00%	-2,763	-45.84%	6,027
Clinton	755	22.69%	2,573	77.31%	0	0.00%	-1,818	-54.63%	3,328
Crittenden	1,834	41.01%	2,624	58.68%	14	0.31%	-790	-17.67%	4,472
Cumberland	872	25.58%	2,533	74.30%	4	0.12%	-1,661	-48.72%	3,409
Daviess	9,344	62.19%	5,633	37.49%	49	0.33%	3,711	24.70%	15,026
Edmonson	1,332	33.86%	2,589	65.81%	13	0.33%	-1,257	-31.95%	3,934
Elliott	2,013	76.05%	634	23.95%	0	0.00%	1,379	52.10%	2,647
Estill	2,587	47.16%	2,889	52.66%	10	0.18%	-302	-5.50%	5,486
Fayette	15,834	55.69%	12,514	44.01%	84	0.30%	3,320	11.68%	28,432
Fleming	2,999	51.11%	2,855	48.65%	14	0.24%	144	2.45%	5,868
Floyd	9,100	71.03%	3,711	28.97%	0	0.00%	5,389	42.07%	12,811
Franklin	6,956	78.18%	1,927	21.66%	14	0.16%	5,029	56.52%	8,897
Fulton	3,592	81.79%	791	18.01%	9	0.20%	2,801	63.78%	4,392
Gallatin	1,473	74.70%	495	25.10%	4	0.20%	978	49.59%	1,972
Garrard	2,162	50.07%	2,148	49.75%	8	0.19%	14	0.32%	4,318
Grant	2,729	63.93%	1,535	35.96%	5	0.12%	1,194	27.97%	4,269
Graves	9,786	81.99%	2,122	17.78%	27	0.23%	7,664	64.21%	11,935
Grayson	2,678	45.69%	3,156	53.85%	27	0.46%	-478	-8.16%	5,861
Green	1,993	44.21%	2,497	55.39%	18	0.40%	-504	-11.18%	4,508
Greenup	4,742	53.73%	4,059	45.99%	24	0.27%	683	7.74%	8,825
Hancock	1,338	48.41%	1,424	51.52%	2	0.07%	-86	-3.11%	2,764
Hardin	4,718	66.54%	2,351	33.16%	21	0.30%	2,367	33.39%	7,090
Harlan	10,582	64.20%	5,859	35.55%	42	0.25%	4,723	28.65%	16,483
Harrison	4,228	71.01%	1,707	28.67%	19	0.32%	2,521	42.34%	5,954
Hart	3,280	53.29%	2,866	46.56%	9	0.15%	414	6.73%	6,155
Henderson	6,727	73.03%	2,455	26.65%	29	0.31%	4,272	46.38%	9,211
Henry	3,862	72.47%	1,445	27.12%	22	0.41%	2,417	45.36%	5,329
Hickman	2,758	84.73%	490	15.05%	7	0.22%	2,268	69.68%	3,255
Hopkins	8,695	68.96%	3,884	30.80%	30	0.24%	4,811	38.16%	12,609
Jackson	465	11.07%	3,722	88.62%	13	0.31%	-3,257	-77.55%	4,200
Jefferson	94,710	58.75%	66,052	40.97%	456	0.28%	28,658	17.78%	161,218
Jessamine	2,815	60.00%	1,837	39.15%	40	0.85%	978	20.84%	4,692
Johnson	3,042	37.58%	5,042	62.29%	10	0.12%	-2,000	-24.71%	8,094
Kenton	19,261	59.30%	13,147	40.47%	74	0.23%	6,114	18.82%	32,482
Knott	4,434	85.38%	759	14.62%	0	0.00%	3,675	70.77%	5,193
Knox	3,319	39.84%	5,003	60.06%	8	0.10%	-1,684	-20.22%	8,330
Larue	2,463	65.14%	1,309	34.62%	9	0.24%	1,154	30.52%	3,781
Laurel	2,860	35.48%	5,180	64.27%	20	0.25%	-2,320	-28.78%	8,060
Lawrence	3,178	50.83%	3,055	48.86%	19	0.30%	123	1.97%	6,252
Lee	1,622	46.41%	1,866	53.39%	7	0.20%	-244	-6.98%	3,495
Leslie	626	15.97%	3,292	83.96%	3	0.08%	-2,666	-67.99%	3,921
Letcher	6,127	57.92%	4,433	41.90%	19	0.18%	1,694	16.01%	10,579
Lewis	1,878	35.78%	3,371	64.22%	0	0.00%	-1,493	-28.44%	5,249
Lincoln	3,657	53.91%	3,090	45.56%	36	0.53%	567	8.36%	6,783
Livingston	2,013	62.65%	1,184	36.85%	16	0.50%	829	25.80%	3,213
Logan	6,631	74.44%	2,268	25.46%	9	0.10%	4,363	48.98%	8,908
Lyon	1,979	67.84%	921	31.57%	17	0.58%	1,058	36.27%	2,917
Madison	6,484	52.54%	5,789	46.91%	67	0.54%	695	5.63%	12,340
Magoffin	2,812	51.30%	2,668	48.68%	1	0.02%	144	2.63%	5,481
Marion	3,482	66.15%	1,763	33.49%	19	0.36%	1,719	32.66%	5,264
Marshall	3,549	76.13%	1,100	23.60%	13	0.28%	2,449	52.53%	4,662
Martin	826	26.63%	2,275	73.34%	1	0.03%	-1,449	-46.71%	3,102
Mason	4,386	54.03%	3,704	45.63%	27	0.33%	682	8.40%	8,117
McCracken	11,562	76.23%	3,554	23.43%	52	0.34%	8,008	52.80%	15,168
McCreary	1,248	28.18%	3,172	71.62%	9	0.20%	-1,924	-43.44%	4,429
McLean	2,709	61.33%	1,698	38.44%	10	0.23%	1,011	22.89%	4,417
Meade	2,114	67.73%	995	31.88%	12	0.38%	1,119	35.85%	3,121
Menifee	1,176	69.50%	511	30.20%	5	0.30%	665	39.30%	1,692
Mercer	3,606	65.92%	1,845	33.73%	19	0.35%	1,761	32.19%	5,470
Metcalfe	1,826	45.15%	2,206	54.55%	12	0.30%	-380	-9.40%	4,044
Monroe	1,390	29.44%	3,321	70.33%	11	0.23%	-1,931	-40.89%	4,722
Montgomery	2,755	62.06%	1,671	37.64%	13	0.29%	1,084	24.42%	4,439
Morgan	4,148	73.33%	1,509	26.67%	0	0.00%	2,639	46.65%	5,657
Muhlenberg	5,140	48.95%	5,332	50.78%	28	0.27%	-192	-1.83%	10,500
Nelson	4,193	66.45%	2,109	33.42%	8	0.13%	2,084	33.03%	6,310
Nicholas	2,124	63.50%	1,207	36.08%	14	0.42%	917	27.41%	3,345
Ohio	3,729	45.45%	4,451	54.25%	24	0.29%	-722	-8.80%	8,204
Oldham	1,983	69.80%	848	29.85%	10	0.35%	1,135	39.95%	2,841
Owen	3,655	86.39%	569	13.45%	7	0.17%	3,086	72.94%	4,231
Owsley	591	18.10%	2,672	81.81%	3	0.09%	-2,081	-63.72%	3,266
Pendleton	2,165	51.45%	2,029	48.22%	14	0.33%	136	3.23%	4,208
Perry	6,852	59.26%	4,693	40.59%	18	0.16%	2,159	18.67%	11,563
Pike	12,160	57.46%	8,985	42.46%	16	0.08%	3,175	15.00%	21,161
Powell	1,266	55.77%	989	43.57%	15	0.66%	277	12.20%	2,270
Pulaski	4,896	36.35%	8,533	63.36%	39	0.29%	-3,637	-27.00%	13,468
Robertson	829	58.63%	578	40.88%	7	0.50%	251	17.75%	1,414
Rockcastle	1,652	31.81%	3,536	68.08%	6	0.12%	-1,884	-36.27%	5,194
Rowan	2,294	54.10%	1,944	45.85%	2	0.05%	350	8.25%	4,240
Russell	1,250	28.84%	3,069	70.81%	15	0.35%	-1,819	-41.97%	4,334
Scott	4,039	69.05%	1,795	30.69%	15	0.26%	2,244	38.37%	5,849
Shelby	4,823	71.96%	1,861	27.77%	18	0.27%	2,962	44.20%	6,702
Simpson	2,950	74.78%	987	25.02%	8	0.20%	1,963	49.76%	3,945
Spencer	1,728	75.13%	567	24.65%	5	0.22%	1,161	50.48%	2,300
Taylor	2,790	49.77%	2,792	49.80%	24	0.43%	-2	-0.04%	5,606
Todd	3,337	69.64%	1,436	29.97%	19	0.40%	1,901	39.67%	4,792
Trigg	2,883	65.70%	1,494	34.05%	11	0.25%	1,389	31.65%	4,388
Trimble	1,909	88.58%	242	11.23%	4	0.19%	1,667	77.35%	2,155
Union	4,355	79.56%	1,111	20.30%	8	0.15%	3,244	59.26%	5,474
Warren	7,569	64.14%	4,195	35.55%	36	0.31%	3,374	28.59%	11,800
Washington	2,612	52.49%	2,362	47.47%	2	0.04%	250	5.02%	4,976
Wayne	2,519	44.18%	3,177	55.72%	6	0.11%	-658	-11.54%	5,702
Webster	4,197	66.40%	2,107	33.33%	17	0.27%	2,090	33.06%	6,321
Whitley	4,078	38.49%	6,502	61.36%	16	0.15%	-2,424	-22.88%	10,596
Wolfe	2,205	68.12%	1,032	31.88%	0	0.00%	1,173	36.24%	3,237
Woodford	2,630	63.36%	1,514	36.47%	7	0.17%	1,116	26.89%	4,151
Totals	557,322	57.45%	410,384	42.30%	2,457	0.25%	146,938	15.15%	970,163

==== Counties that flipped from Democratic to Republican ====
- Campbell
- Hancock
- Muhlenberg

==== Counties that flipped from Republican to Democratic ====
- Magoffin
