= 1868 United States presidential election in Kentucky =

- November 3, 1868
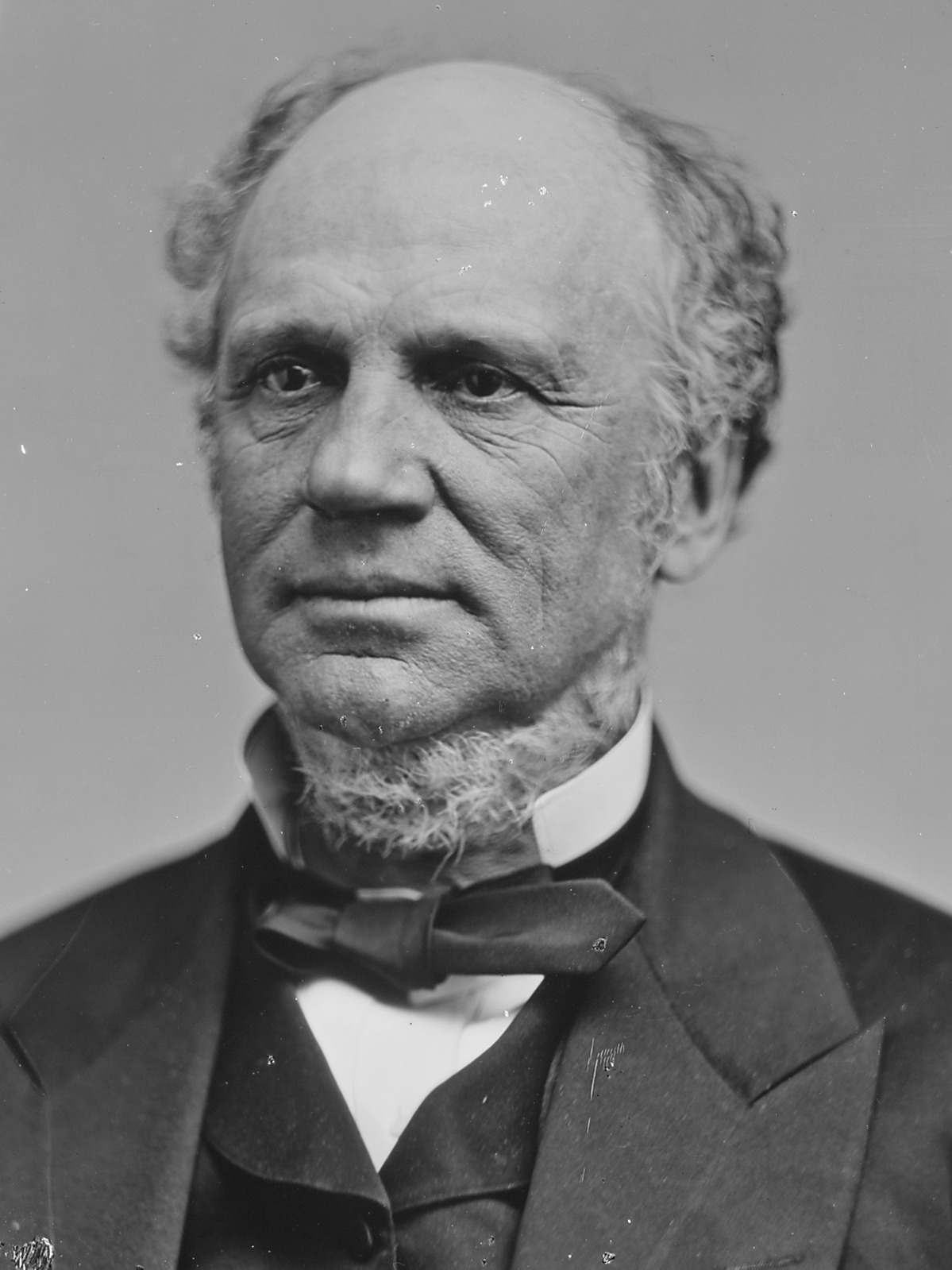

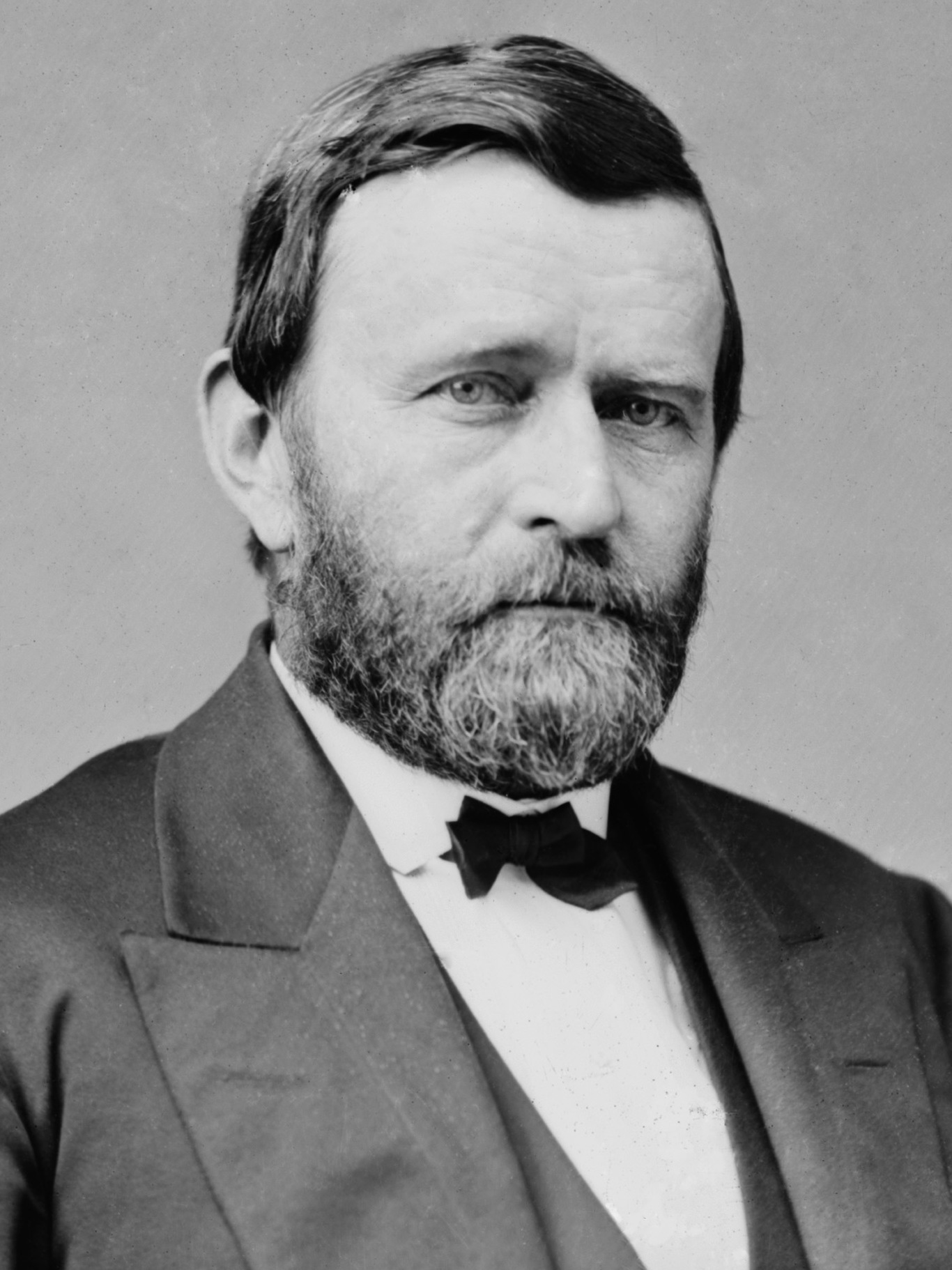
Nominee	Horatio Seymour	Ulysses S. Grant
Party	Democratic	Republican
Home state	New York	Illinois
Running mate	Francis Preston Blair Jr.	Schuyler Colfax
Electoral vote	11	0
Popular vote	115,889	39,566
Percentage	74.55%	25.45%
County results
Seymour
50–60%
60–70%
70–80%
80–90%
90–100%
Grant
50–60%
60–70%
70–80%
80–90%
President before election
Andrew Johnson
Democratic
Elected President
Ulysses S. Grant
Republican

The 1868 United States presidential election in Kentucky took place on November 3, 1868, as part of the 1868 United States presidential election. Voters chose 11 representatives, or electors to the Electoral College, who voted for president and vice president.

Kentucky voted for the Democratic nominee, Horatio Seymour over the Republican nominee, Ulysses S. Grant. Seymour won the state by a margin of 49.1%.

With 74.55% of the popular vote, Kentucky would be Seymour's strongest victory in terms of percentage in the popular vote. As of the 2024 presidential election, this remains the strongest-ever performance by a presidential nominee in Kentucky who had a major-party opponent since the First Party System, when Democratic-Republicans regularly routed Federalists with over 90% of the vote. It was also the last time that Clinton County or Cumberland County would vote for a Democratic presidential candidate.

== Results ==
1868 United States presidential election in Kentucky
Party	Candidate	Running mate	Popular vote		Electoral vote	
Party	Candidate	Running mate	Count	%	Count	%
Democratic	Horatio Seymour of New York	Francis Preston Blair Jr. of Missouri	115,889	74.55%	11	100.00%
Republican	Ulysses S. Grant of Illinois	Schuyler Colfax of Indiana	39,566	25.44%	0	0.00%
Total			155,455	100.00%	11	100.00%

== See also ==
- United States presidential elections in Kentucky
