= 1836 United States presidential election in Kentucky =

- November 7–9, 1836
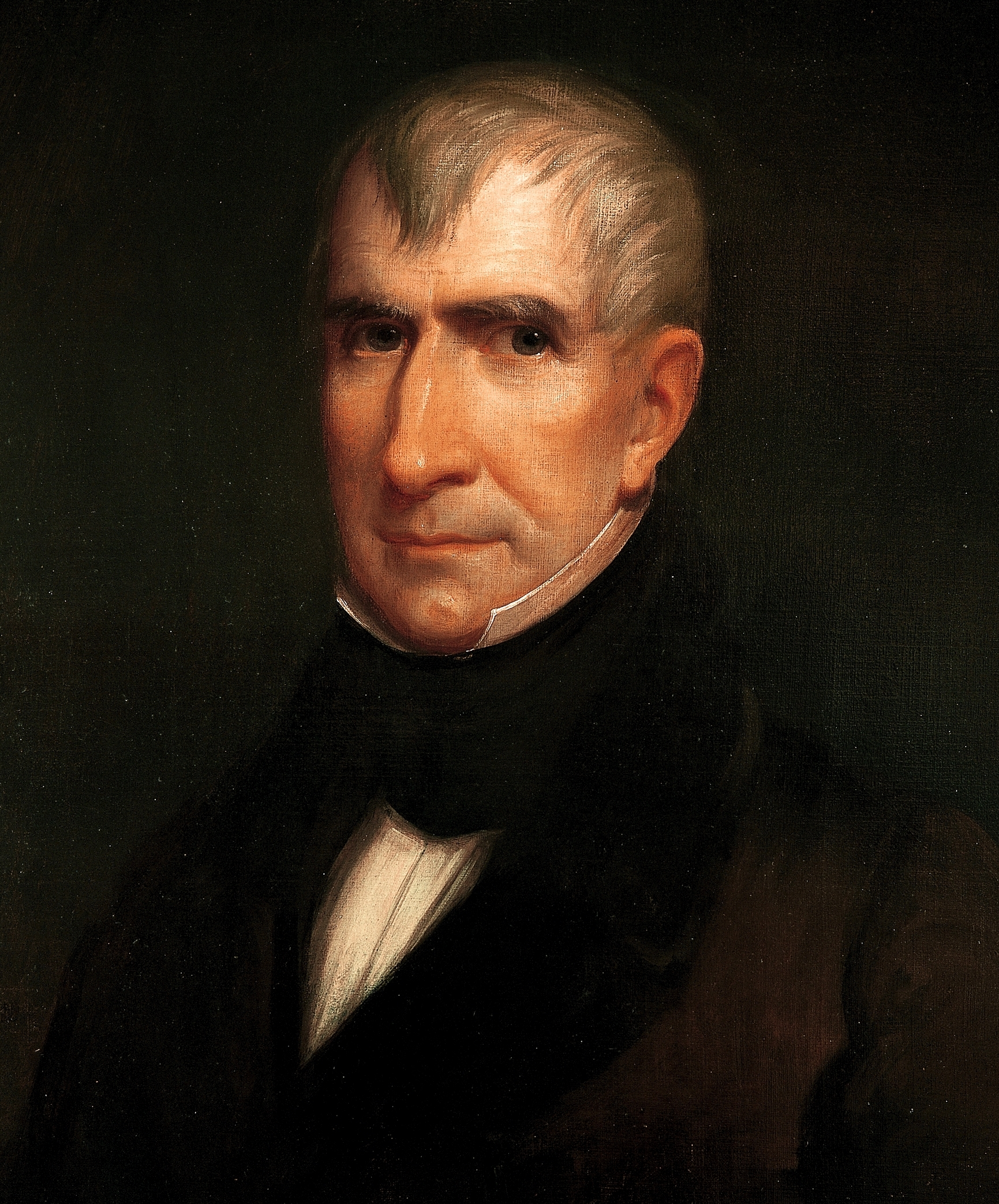

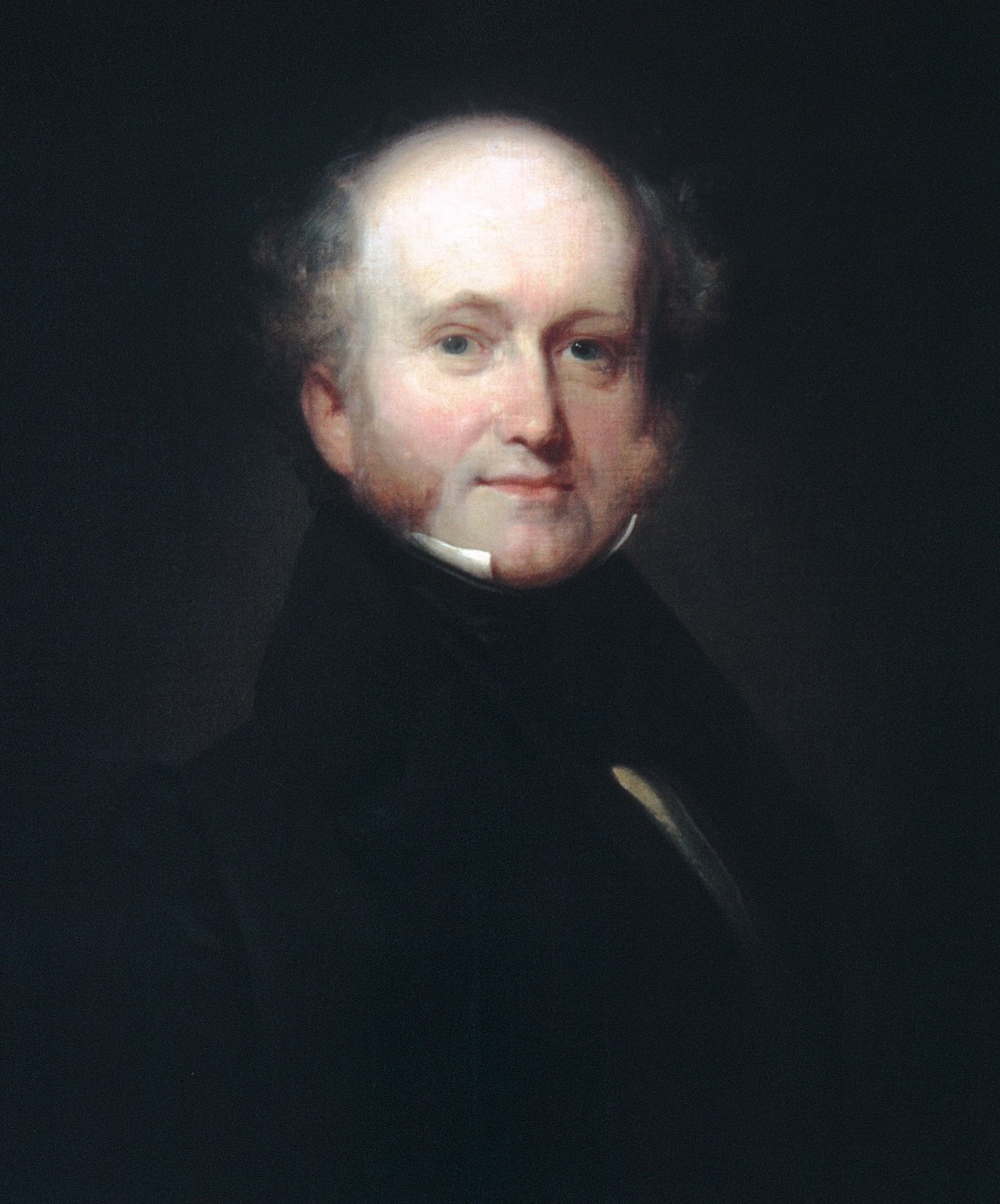
Nominee	William Henry Harrison	Martin Van Buren
Party	Whig	Democratic
Home state	Ohio	New York
Running mate	Francis Granger	Richard Mentor Johnson
Electoral vote	15	0
Popular vote	36,861	33,229
Percentage	52.59%	47.41%
County results
Harrison
50–60%
60–70%
70–80%
80–90%
Van Buren
50–60%
60–70%
70–80%
80–90%

The 1836 United States presidential election in Kentucky was held between November 7 and 9, 1836 as part of the 1836 United States presidential election. Voters chose 15 representatives, or electors to the Electoral College, who voted for President and Vice President.

Kentucky voted for Whig candidate William Henry Harrison over the Democratic candidate, Martin Van Buren. Harrison won Kentucky by a margin of 5.18%.

== Results ==
1836 United States presidential election in Kentucky
Party	Candidate	Votes	Percentage	Electoral votes
Whig	William Henry Harrison	36,861	52.59%	15
Democratic	Martin Van Buren	33,229	47.41%	0
Totals		70,090	100.0%	15
