= 1908 United States presidential election in Kentucky =

- November 3, 1908
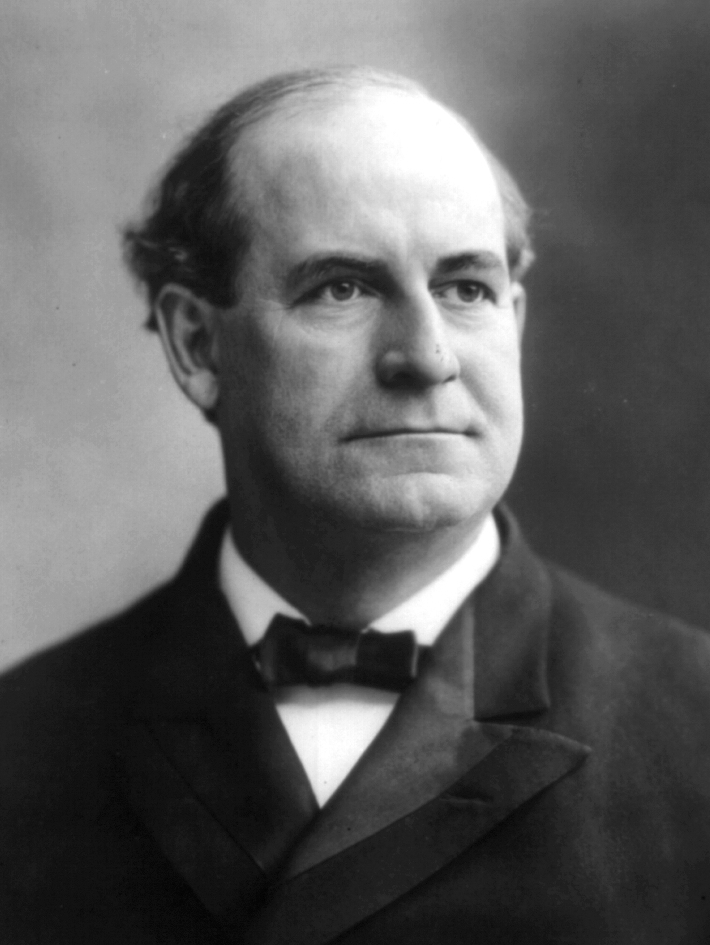

Nominee	William Jennings Bryan	William Howard Taft
Party	Democratic	Republican
Home state	Nebraska	Ohio
Running mate	John W. Kern	James S. Sherman
Electoral vote	13	0
Popular vote	244,092	235,711
Percentage	49.74%	48.03%
County results
Bryan
40–50%
50–60%
60–70%
70–80%
Taft
50–60%
60–70%
70–80%
80–90%
90–100%
President before election
Theodore Roosevelt
Republican
Elected President
William Howard Taft
Republican

The 1908 United States presidential election in Kentucky took place on November 3, 1908. All contemporary 46 states were part of the 1908 United States presidential election. Voters chose 13 electors to the Electoral College, which selected the president and vice president.

Kentucky was won by the Democratic nominees, former Representative William Jennings Bryan of Nebraska and his running mate John W. Kern of Indiana. They defeated the Republican nominees, Secretary of War William Howard Taft of Ohio and his running mate James S. Sherman of New York. Bryan won the state by a narrow margin of 1.71%.

Although the overall result was very similar to the previous two elections, Taft was notably the only Republican to carry Breathitt County until John McCain did so 100 years later.

Bryan had previously lost Kentucky to William McKinley in 1896 but would win the state against McKinley in the state in 1900.

== Results ==
1908 United States presidential election in Kentucky
Party	Candidate	Votes	Percentage	Electoral votes
Democratic	William Jennings Bryan	244,092	49.74%	13
Republican	William Howard Taft	235,711	48.03%	0
Prohibition	Eugene W. Chafin	5,885	1.20%	0
Social Democratic	Eugene V. Debs	4,093	0.83%	0
Socialist Labor	August Gillhaus	405	0.08%	0
Populist	Thomas E. Watson	333	0.07%	0
Independence	Thomas L. Hisgen	200	0.04%	0
Totals		490,719	100.00%	13
Voter turnout				—

=== Results by county ===
County	William Jennings Bryan Democratic		William Howard Taft Republican		Eugene Wilder Chafin Prohibition		Eugene Victor Debs Socialist		Thomas Edward Watson Populist		Various candidates Other parties		Margin		Total votes cast
County	#	%	#	%	#	%	#	%	#	%	#	%	#	%	Total votes cast
Adair	1,429	42.44%	1,872	55.60%	64	1.90%	0	0.00%	0	0.00%	2	0.06%	-443	-13.16%	3,367
Allen	1,402	41.34%	1,922	56.68%	58	1.71%	4	0.12%	2	0.06%	3	0.09%	-520	-15.33%	3,391
Anderson	1,477	57.56%	1,040	40.53%	46	1.79%	1	0.04%	1	0.04%	1	0.04%	437	17.03%	2,566
Ballard	2,117	72.25%	706	24.10%	34	1.16%	63	2.15%	3	0.10%	7	0.24%	1,411	48.16%	2,930
Barren	3,145	56.42%	2,308	41.41%	102	1.83%	8	0.14%	4	0.07%	7	0.13%	837	15.02%	5,574
Bath	1,754	53.52%	1,471	44.89%	42	1.28%	6	0.18%	2	0.06%	2	0.06%	283	8.64%	3,277
Bell	925	23.98%	2,815	72.97%	30	0.78%	88	2.28%	0	0.00%	0	0.00%	-1,890	-48.99%	3,858
Boone	2,041	75.34%	631	23.29%	31	1.14%	6	0.22%	0	0.00%	0	0.00%	1,410	52.05%	2,709
Bourbon	2,508	51.37%	2,312	47.36%	48	0.98%	14	0.29%	0	0.00%	0	0.00%	196	4.01%	4,882
Boyd	1,950	39.28%	2,894	58.30%	63	1.27%	53	1.07%	3	0.06%	1	0.02%	-944	-19.02%	4,964
Boyle	1,787	53.71%	1,485	44.63%	44	1.32%	10	0.30%	0	0.00%	1	0.03%	302	9.08%	3,327
Bracken	1,510	55.88%	1,100	40.71%	44	1.63%	47	1.74%	1	0.04%	0	0.00%	410	15.17%	2,702
Breathitt	1,567	48.68%	1,620	50.33%	32	0.99%	0	0.00%	0	0.00%	0	0.00%	-53	-1.65%	3,219
Breckinridge	2,090	43.47%	2,603	54.14%	81	1.68%	28	0.58%	6	0.12%	0	0.00%	-513	-10.67%	4,808
Bullitt	1,409	64.75%	726	33.36%	34	1.56%	7	0.32%	0	0.00%	0	0.00%	683	31.39%	2,176
Butler	1,012	29.70%	2,328	68.33%	55	1.61%	3	0.09%	7	0.21%	2	0.06%	-1,316	-38.63%	3,407
Caldwell	1,541	49.05%	1,517	48.28%	42	1.34%	31	0.99%	8	0.25%	3	0.10%	24	0.76%	3,142
Calloway	3,024	76.08%	808	20.33%	101	2.54%	25	0.63%	11	0.28%	6	0.15%	2,216	55.75%	3,975
Campbell	6,813	46.02%	7,025	47.45%	120	0.81%	810	5.47%	1	0.01%	35	0.24%	-212	-1.43%	14,804
Carlisle	1,625	74.40%	482	22.07%	55	2.52%	22	1.01%	0	0.00%	0	0.00%	1,143	52.34%	2,184
Carroll	1,514	71.86%	546	25.91%	45	2.14%	2	0.09%	0	0.00%	0	0.00%	968	45.94%	2,107
Carter	1,595	36.96%	2,620	60.70%	70	1.62%	27	0.63%	1	0.02%	3	0.07%	-1,025	-23.75%	4,316
Casey	1,191	38.35%	1,878	60.46%	27	0.87%	6	0.19%	0	0.00%	4	0.13%	-687	-22.12%	3,106
Christian	3,120	39.88%	4,618	59.03%	59	0.75%	19	0.24%	2	0.03%	5	0.06%	-1,498	-19.15%	7,823
Clark	2,525	56.67%	1,859	41.72%	52	1.17%	20	0.45%	0	0.00%	0	0.00%	666	14.95%	4,456
Clay	691	25.43%	1,991	73.28%	26	0.96%	9	0.33%	0	0.00%	0	0.00%	-1,300	-47.85%	2,717
Clinton	330	22.49%	1,082	73.76%	34	2.32%	18	1.23%	0	0.00%	3	0.20%	-752	-51.26%	1,467
Crittenden	1,309	42.62%	1,714	55.81%	26	0.85%	14	0.46%	7	0.23%	1	0.03%	-405	-13.19%	3,071
Cumberland	605	33.48%	1,172	64.86%	26	1.44%	1	0.06%	1	0.06%	2	0.11%	-567	-31.38%	1,807
Daviess	5,218	55.96%	3,922	42.06%	143	1.53%	30	0.32%	4	0.04%	7	0.08%	1,296	13.90%	9,324
Edmonson	858	39.48%	1,291	59.41%	16	0.74%	6	0.28%	1	0.05%	1	0.05%	-433	-19.93%	2,173
Elliott	1,159	64.93%	618	34.62%	8	0.45%	0	0.00%	0	0.00%	0	0.00%	541	30.31%	1,785
Estill	996	39.18%	1,503	59.13%	43	1.69%	0	0.00%	0	0.00%	0	0.00%	-507	-19.94%	2,542
Fayette	5,247	51.68%	4,748	46.76%	108	1.06%	30	0.30%	2	0.02%	18	0.18%	499	4.91%	10,153
Fleming	2,057	50.21%	1,984	48.43%	52	1.27%	3	0.07%	1	0.02%	0	0.00%	73	1.78%	4,097
Floyd	1,601	50.09%	1,557	48.72%	32	1.00%	4	0.13%	0	0.00%	2	0.06%	44	1.38%	3,196
Franklin	3,233	65.85%	1,632	33.24%	32	0.65%	9	0.18%	1	0.02%	3	0.06%	1,601	32.61%	4,910
Fulton	1,705	71.58%	636	26.70%	25	1.05%	6	0.25%	6	0.25%	4	0.17%	1,069	44.88%	2,382
Gallatin	958	74.38%	321	24.92%	7	0.54%	2	0.16%	0	0.00%	0	0.00%	637	49.46%	1,288
Garrard	1,259	43.50%	1,578	54.53%	49	1.69%	5	0.17%	0	0.00%	3	0.10%	-319	-11.02%	2,894
Grant	1,654	59.28%	1,099	39.39%	32	1.15%	5	0.18%	0	0.00%	0	0.00%	555	19.89%	2,790
Graves	4,952	71.32%	1,744	25.12%	115	1.66%	108	1.56%	3	0.04%	21	0.30%	3,208	46.20%	6,943
Grayson	1,864	43.40%	2,360	54.95%	33	0.77%	0	0.00%	37	0.86%	1	0.02%	-496	-11.55%	4,295
Green	1,167	45.93%	1,337	52.62%	23	0.91%	10	0.39%	1	0.04%	3	0.12%	-170	-6.69%	2,541
Greenup	1,441	38.55%	2,142	57.30%	74	1.98%	78	2.09%	0	0.00%	3	0.08%	-701	-18.75%	3,738
Hancock	868	43.75%	1,052	53.02%	48	2.42%	11	0.55%	3	0.15%	2	0.10%	-184	-9.27%	1,984
Hardin	3,010	60.32%	1,913	38.34%	29	0.58%	30	0.60%	3	0.06%	5	0.10%	1,097	21.98%	4,990
Harlan	252	15.16%	1,392	83.75%	17	1.02%	1	0.06%	0	0.00%	0	0.00%	-1,140	-68.59%	1,662
Harrison	2,797	63.14%	1,571	35.46%	61	1.38%	0	0.00%	1	0.02%	0	0.00%	1,226	27.67%	4,430
Hart	1,766	46.46%	1,950	51.30%	54	1.42%	31	0.82%	0	0.00%	0	0.00%	-184	-4.84%	3,801
Henderson	3,735	57.29%	2,528	38.77%	85	1.30%	163	2.50%	3	0.05%	6	0.09%	1,207	18.51%	6,520
Henry	2,253	61.42%	1,358	37.02%	51	1.39%	0	0.00%	0	0.00%	6	0.16%	895	24.40%	3,668
Hickman	1,890	73.09%	658	25.44%	30	1.16%	8	0.31%	0	0.00%	0	0.00%	1,232	47.64%	2,586
Hopkins	3,721	51.46%	3,315	45.84%	101	1.40%	68	0.94%	18	0.25%	8	0.11%	406	5.61%	7,231
Jackson	232	11.10%	1,851	88.56%	5	0.24%	2	0.10%	0	0.00%	0	0.00%	-1,619	-77.46%	2,090
Jefferson	26,186	47.87%	27,180	49.69%	438	0.80%	653	1.19%	9	0.02%	234	0.43%	-994	-1.82%	54,700
Jessamine	1,574	53.32%	1,271	43.06%	95	3.22%	12	0.41%	0	0.00%	0	0.00%	303	10.26%	2,952
Johnson	1,004	29.52%	2,336	68.69%	21	0.62%	40	1.18%	0	0.00%	0	0.00%	-1,332	-39.16%	3,401
Kenton	8,683	55.04%	6,431	40.76%	135	0.86%	505	3.20%	2	0.01%	21	0.13%	2,252	14.27%	15,777
Knott	1,110	65.14%	576	33.80%	18	1.06%	0	0.00%	0	0.00%	0	0.00%	534	31.34%	1,704
Knox	867	22.94%	2,788	73.76%	28	0.74%	96	2.54%	0	0.00%	1	0.03%	-1,921	-50.82%	3,780
Larue	1,337	56.06%	1,029	43.14%	13	0.55%	4	0.17%	1	0.04%	1	0.04%	308	12.91%	2,385
Laurel	1,165	30.53%	2,594	67.98%	42	1.10%	15	0.39%	0	0.00%	0	0.00%	-1,429	-37.45%	3,816
Lawrence	1,878	46.58%	2,098	52.03%	47	1.17%	6	0.15%	1	0.02%	2	0.05%	-220	-5.46%	4,032
Lee	783	39.77%	1,171	59.47%	12	0.61%	2	0.10%	1	0.05%	0	0.00%	-388	-19.71%	1,969
Leslie	95	6.31%	1,399	92.90%	4	0.27%	3	0.20%	3	0.20%	2	0.13%	-1,304	-86.59%	1,506
Letcher	476	28.88%	1,158	70.27%	9	0.55%	2	0.12%	0	0.00%	3	0.18%	-682	-41.38%	1,648
Lewis	1,268	32.46%	2,549	65.26%	65	1.66%	23	0.59%	1	0.03%	0	0.00%	-1,281	-32.80%	3,906
Lincoln	1,994	50.54%	1,851	46.92%	94	2.38%	2	0.05%	1	0.03%	3	0.08%	143	3.62%	3,945
Livingston	1,183	51.77%	997	43.63%	41	1.79%	53	2.32%	11	0.48%	0	0.00%	186	8.14%	2,285
Logan	3,114	55.95%	2,326	41.79%	67	1.20%	46	0.83%	9	0.16%	4	0.07%	788	14.16%	5,566
Lyon	1,001	54.94%	759	41.66%	21	1.15%	4	0.22%	37	2.03%	0	0.00%	242	13.28%	1,822
Madison	3,065	48.20%	3,191	50.18%	49	0.77%	16	0.25%	1	0.02%	37	0.58%	-126	-1.98%	6,359
Magoffin	1,005	37.46%	1,645	61.31%	29	1.08%	3	0.11%	0	0.00%	1	0.04%	-640	-23.85%	2,683
Marion	2,093	61.09%	1,321	38.56%	10	0.29%	2	0.06%	0	0.00%	0	0.00%	772	22.53%	3,426
Marshall	1,852	58.76%	1,217	38.61%	62	1.97%	8	0.25%	13	0.41%	0	0.00%	635	20.15%	3,152
Martin	240	18.28%	1,042	79.36%	11	0.84%	7	0.53%	0	0.00%	13	0.99%	-802	-61.08%	1,313
Mason	2,675	54.47%	2,136	43.49%	85	1.73%	14	0.29%	1	0.02%	0	0.00%	539	10.98%	4,911
McCracken	4,127	56.65%	2,966	40.71%	64	0.88%	100	1.37%	9	0.12%	19	0.26%	1,161	15.94%	7,285
McLean	1,430	49.81%	1,319	45.94%	75	2.61%	20	0.70%	7	0.24%	20	0.70%	111	3.87%	2,871
Meade	1,295	58.84%	863	39.21%	18	0.82%	15	0.68%	1	0.05%	9	0.41%	432	19.63%	2,201
Menifee	833	64.82%	451	35.10%	0	0.00%	0	0.00%	0	0.00%	1	0.08%	382	29.73%	1,285
Mercer	1,747	51.29%	1,567	46.01%	82	2.41%	3	0.09%	7	0.21%	0	0.00%	180	5.28%	3,406
Metcalfe	968	41.87%	1,311	56.70%	25	1.08%	1	0.04%	0	0.00%	7	0.30%	-343	-14.84%	2,312
Monroe	770	29.03%	1,861	70.17%	20	0.75%	1	0.04%	0	0.00%	0	0.00%	-1,091	-41.14%	2,652
Montgomery	1,549	53.52%	1,305	45.09%	32	1.11%	6	0.21%	0	0.00%	2	0.07%	244	8.43%	2,894
Morgan	2,013	58.67%	1,400	40.80%	15	0.44%	0	0.00%	1	0.03%	2	0.06%	613	17.87%	3,431
Muhlenberg	2,740	45.96%	3,063	51.38%	61	1.02%	90	1.51%	8	0.13%	0	0.00%	-323	-5.42%	5,962
Nelson	2,452	62.31%	1,436	36.49%	26	0.66%	4	0.10%	3	0.08%	14	0.36%	1,016	25.82%	3,935
Nicholas	1,723	60.18%	1,085	37.90%	46	1.61%	3	0.10%	1	0.03%	5	0.17%	638	22.28%	2,863
Ohio	2,785	44.20%	3,337	52.96%	91	1.44%	74	1.17%	8	0.13%	6	0.10%	-552	-8.76%	6,301
Oldham	1,259	65.13%	625	32.33%	38	1.97%	11	0.57%	0	0.00%	0	0.00%	634	32.80%	1,933
Owen	2,732	78.39%	735	21.09%	13	0.37%	1	0.03%	4	0.11%	0	0.00%	1,997	57.30%	3,485
Owsley	224	15.20%	1,240	84.12%	6	0.41%	0	0.00%	0	0.00%	4	0.27%	-1,016	-68.93%	1,474
Pendleton	1,543	54.72%	1,177	41.74%	60	2.13%	38	1.35%	0	0.00%	2	0.07%	366	12.98%	2,820
Perry	524	28.74%	1,274	69.88%	13	0.71%	6	0.33%	2	0.11%	4	0.22%	-750	-41.14%	1,823
Pike	2,208	38.27%	3,467	60.10%	81	1.40%	5	0.09%	1	0.02%	7	0.12%	-1,259	-21.82%	5,769
Powell	739	50.48%	699	47.75%	24	1.64%	1	0.07%	1	0.07%	0	0.00%	40	2.73%	1,464
Pulaski	2,460	34.55%	4,483	62.95%	146	2.05%	25	0.35%	5	0.07%	2	0.03%	-2,023	-28.41%	7,121
Robertson	688	62.55%	398	36.18%	11	1.00%	3	0.27%	0	0.00%	0	0.00%	290	26.36%	1,100
Rockcastle	962	33.99%	1,816	64.17%	48	1.70%	2	0.07%	2	0.07%	0	0.00%	-854	-30.18%	2,830
Rowan	757	41.89%	1,017	56.28%	27	1.49%	5	0.28%	0	0.00%	1	0.06%	-260	-14.39%	1,807
Russell	739	35.36%	1,255	60.05%	78	3.73%	18	0.86%	0	0.00%	0	0.00%	-516	-24.69%	2,090
Scott	2,476	57.41%	1,794	41.60%	33	0.77%	7	0.16%	3	0.07%	0	0.00%	682	15.81%	4,313
Shelby	2,742	59.52%	1,823	39.57%	37	0.80%	4	0.09%	0	0.00%	1	0.02%	919	19.95%	4,607
Simpson	1,714	64.44%	913	34.32%	24	0.90%	3	0.11%	4	0.15%	2	0.08%	801	30.11%	2,660
Spencer	1,175	66.72%	563	31.97%	21	1.19%	1	0.06%	1	0.06%	0	0.00%	612	34.75%	1,761
Taylor	1,294	50.29%	1,218	47.34%	58	2.25%	1	0.04%	1	0.04%	1	0.04%	76	2.95%	2,573
Todd	1,908	54.55%	1,555	44.45%	23	0.66%	6	0.17%	0	0.00%	6	0.17%	353	10.09%	3,498
Trigg	1,680	54.28%	1,351	43.65%	20	0.65%	39	1.26%	2	0.06%	3	0.10%	329	10.63%	3,095
Trimble	1,322	77.76%	344	20.24%	25	1.47%	9	0.53%	0	0.00%	0	0.00%	978	57.53%	1,700
Union	2,781	65.61%	1,312	30.95%	41	0.97%	87	2.05%	14	0.33%	4	0.09%	1,469	34.65%	4,239
Warren	3,742	55.07%	2,929	43.11%	100	1.47%	17	0.25%	3	0.04%	4	0.06%	813	11.96%	6,795
Washington	1,615	51.24%	1,515	48.06%	16	0.51%	3	0.10%	2	0.06%	1	0.03%	100	3.17%	3,152
Wayne	1,436	41.93%	1,936	56.53%	48	1.40%	2	0.06%	1	0.03%	2	0.06%	-500	-14.60%	3,425
Webster	2,491	56.42%	1,828	41.40%	83	1.88%	11	0.25%	1	0.02%	1	0.02%	663	15.02%	4,415
Whitley	1,111	21.43%	4,023	77.60%	39	0.75%	0	0.00%	0	0.00%	11	0.21%	-2,912	-56.17%	5,184
Wolfe	1,101	56.55%	818	42.01%	21	1.08%	1	0.05%	4	0.21%	2	0.10%	283	14.54%	1,947
Woodford	1,690	54.53%	1,369	44.18%	36	1.16%	2	0.06%	2	0.06%	0	0.00%	321	10.36%	3,099
Totals	244,092	49.74%	235,711	48.03%	5,885	1.20%	4,093	0.83%	333	0.07%	646	0.13%	8,381	1.71%	490,760

== See also ==
- United States presidential elections in Kentucky
