= 1900 United States presidential election in Kentucky =

- November 6, 1900

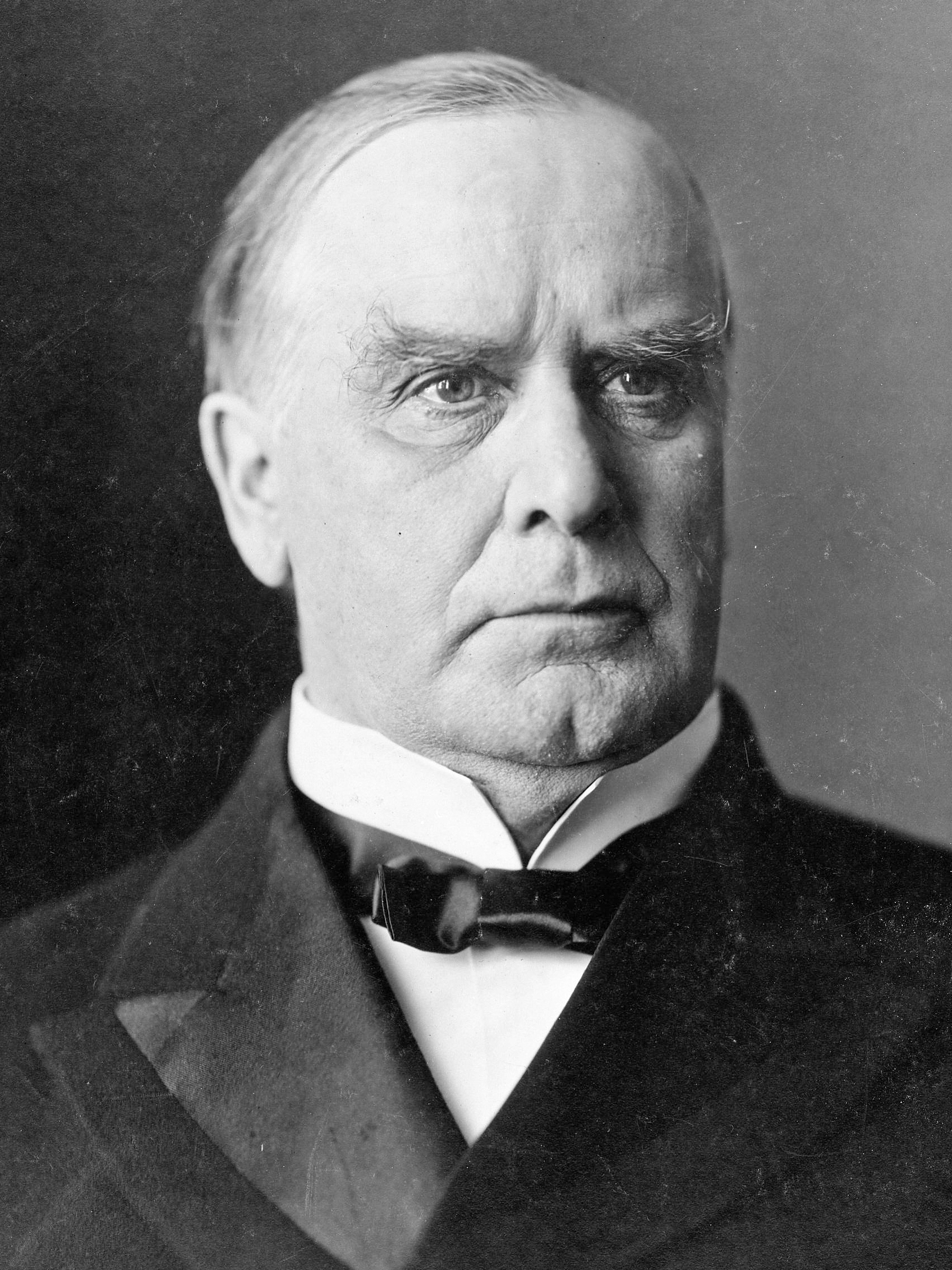
Nominee	William Jennings Bryan	William McKinley
Party	Democratic	Republican
Home state	Nebraska	Ohio
Running mate	Adlai Stevenson I	Theodore Roosevelt
Electoral vote	13	0
Popular vote	235,126	227,132
Percentage	50.21%	48.51%
County results
Bryan
40–50%
50–60%
60–70%
70–80%
McKinley
40–50%
50–60%
60–70%
70–80%
80–90%
90–100%
President before election
William McKinley
Republican
Elected President
William McKinley
Republican

The 1900 United States presidential election in Kentucky took place on November 6, 1900. All contemporary 45 states were part of the 1900 United States presidential election. Voters chose 13 electors to the Electoral College, which selected the president and vice president.

Kentucky was won by the Democratic nominees, former U.S. Representative and 1896 Democratic presidential nominee William Jennings Bryan and his running mate, former Vice President Adlai Stevenson I. They defeated the Republican nominees, incumbent President William McKinley of Ohio and his running mate Theodore Roosevelt of New York. Bryan won the state by a narrow margin of 1.7%.

Ever since the Civil War, Kentucky had been shaped politically by divisions created by that war between secessionist, Democratic counties and Unionist, Republican ones, although the state as a whole leaned Democratic throughout this era and the GOP would never carry the state during the Third Party System. However, the Democratic Party in the state was heavily divided over free silver and the role of corporations in the middle 1890s, and it lost the governorship for the first time in forty years in 1895 due to Populist defections. In 1896, the state's growing urban and coal mining areas, which unlike most parts of the South had developed economic ties with the Midwest and Northeast and thus opposed free silver, gave William McKinley sufficient support to become the first Republican presidential candidate to win Kentucky, winning it by a very narrow margin of 277 votes in what remains the seventh-closest vote for presidential electors on record. (Note: The closer ones, beginning with the closest, are Florida in 2000, Maryland in 1832, Maryland in 1904, California in 1912, California in 1892 and Hawaii in 1960.)

For the rematch in 1900, an early poll had the state in doubt. By the final week of October, polls generally had returning Democratic nominee William Jennings Bryan carrying the state, and this he did by a 1.7 percent margin. His win was generally attributed to the fact that urban and coal counties were more tolerant of anti-imperialism (directed against American colonialism in the Pacific islands) than free silver. This was the only state that had backed McKinley four years prior that Bryan managed to flip.

Bryan would later win the state again in 1908 against William Howard Taft.

== Results ==
1900 United States presidential election in Kentucky
Party	Candidate	Votes	Percentage	Electoral votes
Democratic	William Jennings Bryan	235,126	50.21%	13
Republican	William McKinley (incumbent)	227,132	48.51%	0
Prohibition	John G. Woolley	2,890	0.62%	0
Populist	Wharton Barker	1,961	0.42%	0
Social Democratic	Eugene V. Debs	766	0.16%	0
Socialist Labor	Joseph F. Malloney	390	0.08%	0
Totals		468,265	100.00%	13
Voter turnout				—

=== Results by county ===
County	William Jennings Bryan Democratic		William McKinley Republican		John Granville Woolley Prohibition		Eugene Victor Debs Socialist		Various candidates Other parties		Margin		Total votes cast
County	#	%	#	%	#	%	#	%	#	%	#	%	Total votes cast
Adair	1,452	45.53%	1,713	53.72%	18	0.56%	0	0.00%	6	0.19%	-261	-8.18%	3,189
Allen	1,494	45.67%	1,725	52.74%	22	0.67%	3	0.09%	27	0.83%	-231	-7.06%	3,271
Anderson	1,485	55.91%	1,148	43.22%	15	0.56%	1	0.04%	7	0.26%	337	12.69%	2,656
Ballard	1,877	72.84%	670	26.00%	12	0.47%	0	0.00%	18	0.70%	1,207	46.84%	2,577
Barren	3,170	57.77%	2,234	40.71%	40	0.73%	2	0.04%	41	0.75%	936	17.06%	5,487
Bath	1,836	52.22%	1,654	47.04%	15	0.43%	0	0.00%	11	0.31%	182	5.18%	3,516
Bell	748	25.70%	2,142	73.58%	18	0.62%	1	0.03%	2	0.07%	-1,394	-47.89%	2,911
Boone	2,302	74.89%	759	24.69%	12	0.39%	0	0.00%	1	0.03%	1,543	50.20%	3,074
Bourbon	2,411	50.66%	2,217	46.59%	29	0.61%	6	0.13%	96	2.02%	194	4.08%	4,759
Boyd	1,514	42.84%	1,995	56.45%	18	0.51%	1	0.03%	6	0.17%	-481	-13.61%	3,534
Boyle	1,577	48.15%	1,646	50.26%	41	1.25%	0	0.00%	11	0.34%	-69	-2.11%	3,275
Bracken	1,869	58.13%	1,318	41.00%	21	0.65%	1	0.03%	6	0.19%	551	17.14%	3,215
Breathitt	1,573	64.63%	850	34.92%	9	0.37%	2	0.08%	0	0.00%	723	29.70%	2,434
Breckinridge	2,231	46.11%	2,534	52.38%	26	0.54%	0	0.00%	47	0.97%	-303	-6.26%	4,838
Bullitt	1,442	64.69%	772	34.63%	11	0.49%	1	0.04%	3	0.13%	670	30.06%	2,229
Butler	1,131	32.20%	2,333	66.43%	31	0.88%	0	0.00%	17	0.48%	-1,202	-34.23%	3,512
Caldwell	1,475	46.62%	1,622	51.26%	15	0.47%	1	0.03%	51	1.61%	-147	-4.65%	3,164
Calloway	2,876	75.62%	844	22.19%	20	0.53%	0	0.00%	63	1.66%	2,032	53.43%	3,803
Campbell	5,141	46.52%	5,567	50.38%	68	0.62%	208	1.88%	66	0.60%	-426	-3.86%	11,050
Carlisle	1,587	73.20%	533	24.58%	37	1.71%	0	0.00%	11	0.51%	1,054	48.62%	2,168
Carroll	1,808	69.97%	749	28.99%	26	1.01%	0	0.00%	1	0.04%	1,059	40.98%	2,584
Carter	1,720	40.99%	2,452	58.44%	16	0.38%	1	0.02%	7	0.17%	-732	-17.45%	4,196
Casey	1,302	41.89%	1,786	57.46%	15	0.48%	0	0.00%	5	0.16%	-484	-15.57%	3,108
Christian	3,264	41.93%	4,473	57.46%	28	0.36%	0	0.00%	20	0.26%	-1,209	-15.53%	7,785
Clark	2,302	54.41%	1,900	44.91%	22	0.52%	1	0.02%	6	0.14%	402	9.50%	4,231
Clay	681	25.71%	1,948	73.54%	9	0.34%	1	0.04%	10	0.38%	-1,267	-47.83%	2,649
Clinton	414	27.01%	1,107	72.21%	4	0.26%	1	0.07%	7	0.46%	-693	-45.21%	1,533
Crittenden	1,517	44.21%	1,865	54.36%	23	0.67%	0	0.00%	26	0.76%	-348	-10.14%	3,431
Cumberland	660	34.38%	1,241	64.64%	14	0.73%	0	0.00%	5	0.26%	-581	-30.26%	1,920
Daviess	4,910	55.36%	3,738	42.14%	150	1.69%	2	0.02%	70	0.79%	1,172	13.21%	8,870
Edmonson	914	43.84%	1,156	55.44%	6	0.29%	0	0.00%	9	0.43%	-242	-11.61%	2,085
Elliott	1,367	68.52%	624	31.28%	2	0.10%	0	0.00%	2	0.10%	743	37.24%	1,995
Estill	1,000	42.07%	1,329	55.91%	17	0.72%	0	0.00%	31	1.30%	-329	-13.84%	2,377
Fayette	4,293	44.36%	5,302	54.78%	67	0.69%	2	0.02%	14	0.14%	-1,009	-10.43%	9,678
Fleming	2,180	50.35%	2,109	48.71%	40	0.92%	0	0.00%	1	0.02%	71	1.64%	4,330
Floyd	1,615	57.15%	1,197	42.36%	9	0.32%	2	0.07%	3	0.11%	418	14.79%	2,826
Franklin	2,946	60.80%	1,863	38.45%	17	0.35%	5	0.10%	14	0.29%	1,083	22.35%	4,845
Fulton	1,487	70.81%	581	27.67%	22	1.05%	1	0.05%	9	0.43%	906	43.14%	2,100
Gallatin	1,018	71.24%	404	28.27%	7	0.49%	0	0.00%	0	0.00%	614	42.97%	1,429
Garrard	1,312	44.58%	1,592	54.09%	34	1.16%	0	0.00%	5	0.17%	-280	-9.51%	2,943
Grant	2,039	57.79%	1,465	41.52%	22	0.62%	0	0.00%	2	0.06%	574	16.27%	3,528
Graves	4,759	68.30%	2,073	29.75%	40	0.57%	10	0.14%	86	1.23%	2,686	38.55%	6,968
Grayson	1,938	45.61%	2,213	52.08%	9	0.21%	0	0.00%	89	2.09%	-275	-6.47%	4,249
Green	1,243	46.71%	1,399	52.57%	10	0.38%	0	0.00%	9	0.34%	-156	-5.86%	2,661
Greenup	1,430	41.45%	1,982	57.45%	27	0.78%	0	0.00%	11	0.32%	-552	-16.00%	3,450
Hancock	989	46.26%	1,113	52.06%	20	0.94%	0	0.00%	16	0.75%	-124	-5.80%	2,138
Hardin	3,059	58.75%	2,053	39.43%	42	0.81%	6	0.12%	47	0.90%	1,006	19.32%	5,207
Harlan	280	15.03%	1,577	84.65%	3	0.16%	1	0.05%	2	0.11%	-1,297	-69.62%	1,863
Harrison	2,801	59.91%	1,843	39.42%	26	0.56%	1	0.02%	4	0.09%	958	20.49%	4,675
Hart	1,937	47.24%	2,140	52.20%	16	0.39%	0	0.00%	7	0.17%	-203	-4.95%	4,100
Henderson	3,937	57.07%	2,865	41.53%	66	0.96%	12	0.17%	18	0.26%	1,072	15.54%	6,898
Henry	2,366	58.94%	1,609	40.08%	26	0.65%	0	0.00%	13	0.32%	757	18.86%	4,014
Hickman	1,876	67.43%	862	30.98%	28	1.01%	0	0.00%	16	0.58%	1,014	36.45%	2,782
Hopkins	3,321	51.05%	3,024	46.48%	82	1.26%	4	0.06%	75	1.15%	297	4.57%	6,506
Jackson	258	12.68%	1,770	86.98%	2	0.10%	0	0.00%	5	0.25%	-1,512	-74.30%	2,035
Jefferson	21,107	45.36%	24,906	53.52%	169	0.36%	178	0.38%	176	0.38%	-3,799	-8.16%	46,536
Jessamine	1,565	52.59%	1,326	44.56%	80	2.69%	1	0.03%	4	0.13%	239	8.03%	2,976
Johnson	1,025	34.80%	1,897	64.41%	5	0.17%	0	0.00%	18	0.61%	-872	-29.61%	2,945
Kenton	7,263	54.74%	5,650	42.58%	83	0.63%	241	1.82%	31	0.23%	1,613	12.16%	13,268
Knott	1,015	70.15%	429	29.65%	1	0.07%	0	0.00%	2	0.14%	586	40.50%	1,447
Knox	976	27.15%	2,606	72.49%	5	0.14%	0	0.00%	8	0.22%	-1,630	-45.34%	3,595
Larue	1,420	57.49%	1,036	41.94%	8	0.32%	0	0.00%	6	0.24%	384	15.55%	2,470
Laurel	1,198	34.36%	2,241	64.27%	17	0.49%	17	0.49%	14	0.40%	-1,043	-29.91%	3,487
Lawrence	1,946	48.44%	2,052	51.08%	11	0.27%	1	0.02%	7	0.17%	-106	-2.64%	4,017
Lee	637	42.21%	857	56.79%	12	0.80%	0	0.00%	3	0.20%	-220	-14.58%	1,509
Leslie	110	8.46%	1,186	91.23%	2	0.15%	0	0.00%	2	0.15%	-1,076	-82.77%	1,300
Letcher	501	31.97%	1,062	67.77%	3	0.19%	0	0.00%	1	0.06%	-561	-35.80%	1,567
Lewis	1,482	38.48%	2,311	60.01%	37	0.96%	0	0.00%	21	0.55%	-829	-21.53%	3,851
Lincoln	1,871	49.21%	1,925	50.63%	0	0.00%	2	0.05%	4	0.11%	-54	-1.42%	3,802
Livingston	1,515	61.89%	906	37.01%	10	0.41%	1	0.04%	16	0.65%	609	24.88%	2,448
Logan	3,392	55.26%	2,624	42.75%	28	0.46%	2	0.03%	92	1.50%	768	12.51%	6,138
Lyon	1,005	54.65%	789	42.90%	13	0.71%	1	0.05%	31	1.69%	216	11.75%	1,839
Madison	3,046	49.15%	3,084	49.77%	54	0.87%	0	0.00%	13	0.21%	-38	-0.61%	6,197
Magoffin	955	41.87%	1,321	57.91%	3	0.13%	1	0.04%	1	0.04%	-366	-16.05%	2,281
Marion	2,070	57.77%	1,491	41.61%	13	0.36%	2	0.06%	7	0.20%	579	16.16%	3,583
Marshall	1,594	58.28%	997	36.45%	29	1.06%	0	0.00%	115	4.20%	597	21.83%	2,735
Martin	246	23.08%	812	76.17%	4	0.38%	0	0.00%	4	0.38%	-566	-53.10%	1,066
Mason	2,952	54.19%	2,455	45.06%	30	0.55%	2	0.04%	9	0.17%	497	9.12%	5,448
McCracken	3,020	53.39%	2,506	44.31%	56	0.99%	6	0.11%	68	1.20%	514	9.09%	5,656
McLean	1,463	50.96%	1,344	46.81%	28	0.98%	0	0.00%	36	1.25%	119	4.14%	2,871
Meade	1,470	60.72%	919	37.96%	7	0.29%	8	0.33%	17	0.70%	551	22.76%	2,421
Menifee	845	63.92%	470	35.55%	3	0.23%	0	0.00%	4	0.30%	375	28.37%	1,322
Mercer	1,784	49.15%	1,775	48.90%	43	1.18%	2	0.06%	26	0.72%	9	0.25%	3,630
Metcalfe	1,050	47.15%	1,162	52.18%	7	0.31%	0	0.00%	8	0.36%	-112	-5.03%	2,227
Monroe	867	33.09%	1,724	65.80%	9	0.34%	1	0.04%	19	0.73%	-857	-32.71%	2,620
Montgomery	1,589	50.62%	1,533	48.84%	15	0.48%	1	0.03%	1	0.03%	56	1.78%	3,139
Morgan	1,732	61.03%	1,093	38.51%	9	0.32%	0	0.00%	4	0.14%	639	22.52%	2,838
Muhlenberg	1,857	42.12%	2,493	56.54%	28	0.64%	0	0.00%	31	0.70%	-636	-14.43%	4,409
Nelson	2,438	63.01%	1,407	36.37%	14	0.36%	2	0.05%	8	0.21%	1,031	26.65%	3,869
Nicholas	1,879	59.27%	1,262	39.81%	27	0.85%	1	0.03%	1	0.03%	617	19.46%	3,170
Ohio	2,891	46.29%	3,251	52.06%	45	0.72%	1	0.02%	57	0.91%	-360	-5.76%	6,245
Oldham	1,062	60.65%	667	38.09%	18	1.03%	0	0.00%	4	0.23%	395	22.56%	1,751
Owen	3,380	74.24%	1,124	24.69%	33	0.72%	1	0.02%	15	0.33%	2,256	49.55%	4,553
Owsley	255	18.53%	1,115	81.03%	3	0.22%	0	0.00%	3	0.22%	-860	-62.50%	1,376
Pendleton	1,862	53.35%	1,580	45.27%	34	0.97%	5	0.14%	9	0.26%	282	8.08%	3,490
Perry	467	31.32%	1,019	68.34%	4	0.27%	0	0.00%	1	0.07%	-552	-37.02%	1,491
Pike	1,979	46.02%	2,290	53.26%	21	0.49%	0	0.00%	10	0.23%	-311	-7.23%	4,300
Powell	788	52.57%	696	46.43%	8	0.53%	1	0.07%	6	0.40%	92	6.14%	1,499
Pulaski	2,178	34.32%	4,084	64.35%	81	1.28%	4	0.06%	0	0.00%	-1,906	-30.03%	6,347
Robertson	718	58.80%	494	40.46%	9	0.74%	0	0.00%	0	0.00%	224	18.35%	1,221
Rockcastle	1,010	37.98%	1,637	61.56%	8	0.30%	0	0.00%	4	0.15%	-627	-23.58%	2,659
Rowan	790	46.36%	905	53.11%	7	0.41%	0	0.00%	2	0.12%	-115	-6.75%	1,704
Russell	780	39.08%	1,206	60.42%	7	0.35%	0	0.00%	3	0.15%	-426	-21.34%	1,996
Scott	2,539	54.17%	2,107	44.95%	35	0.75%	0	0.00%	6	0.13%	432	9.22%	4,687
Shelby	2,794	58.59%	1,975	41.41%	0	0.00%	0	0.00%	0	0.00%	819	17.17%	4,769
Simpson	1,571	63.04%	866	34.75%	34	1.36%	0	0.00%	21	0.84%	705	28.29%	2,492
Spencer	1,174	66.63%	582	33.03%	4	0.23%	0	0.00%	2	0.11%	592	33.60%	1,762
Taylor	1,286	52.15%	1,131	45.86%	21	0.85%	1	0.04%	27	1.09%	155	6.29%	2,466
Todd	1,868	50.12%	1,825	48.97%	17	0.46%	0	0.00%	17	0.46%	43	1.15%	3,727
Trigg	1,533	49.84%	1,455	47.30%	12	0.39%	1	0.03%	75	2.44%	78	2.54%	3,076
Trimble	1,437	76.03%	437	23.12%	14	0.74%	0	0.00%	2	0.11%	1,000	52.91%	1,890
Union	3,104	67.46%	1,437	31.23%	29	0.63%	0	0.00%	31	0.67%	1,667	36.23%	4,601
Warren	3,455	53.48%	2,928	45.33%	41	0.63%	4	0.06%	32	0.50%	527	8.16%	6,460
Washington	1,669	50.59%	1,600	48.50%	17	0.52%	1	0.03%	12	0.36%	69	2.09%	3,299
Wayne	1,373	46.39%	1,574	53.18%	6	0.20%	0	0.00%	7	0.24%	-201	-6.79%	2,960
Webster	2,481	56.31%	1,849	41.97%	37	0.84%	0	0.00%	39	0.89%	632	14.34%	4,406
Whitley	989	21.24%	3,634	78.05%	27	0.58%	0	0.00%	6	0.13%	-2,645	-56.81%	4,656
Wolfe	959	56.98%	712	42.31%	6	0.36%	0	0.00%	6	0.36%	247	14.68%	1,683
Woodford	1,712	50.97%	1,617	48.14%	24	0.71%	0	0.00%	6	0.18%	95	2.83%	3,359
Totals	235,123	50.21%	227,128	48.51%	2,890	0.62%	766	0.16%	2,346	0.50%	7,995	1.71%	468,253

== See also ==
- United States presidential elections in Kentucky
