= 1968 United States presidential election in Kentucky =

- November 5, 1968

Nominee	Richard Nixon	Hubert Humphrey	George Wallace
Party	Republican	Democratic	American Independent
Home state	New York (Note: Although he was born in California and he served as a U.S. senator from California, in 1968 Richard Nixon's official state of residence was New York, because he moved there to practice law after his defeat in the 1962 California gubernatorial election. During his first term as president, Nixon re-established his residency in California. Consequently, most reliable reference books list Nixon's home state as New York in the 1968 election and his home state as California in the 1972 (and 1960) election.)	Minnesota	Alabama
Running mate	Spiro Agnew	Edmund Muskie	S. Marvin Griffin
Electoral vote	9	0	0
Popular vote	462,411	397,541	193,098
Percentage	43.79%	37.65%	18.29%

Nixon
30–40%
40–50%
50–60%
60–70%
70–80%
80–90%
Humphrey
30–40%
40–50%
50–60%
60–70%
Wallace
30–40%
40–50%
President before election
Lyndon B. Johnson
Democratic
Elected President
Richard Nixon
Republican

The 1968 United States presidential election in Kentucky took place on November 5, 1968. All 50 states and the District of Columbia were part of the 1968 United States presidential election. Kentucky voters chose 9 electors to the Electoral College, which selected the president and vice president of the United States.

Former Vice President Richard Nixon, the Republican nominee, won the state with 462,411 votes and 43.79 percent of the vote, with Vice President Hubert Humphrey, the Democratic nominee, taking 397,541 votes and 37.65 percent of the vote, followed by American Party candidate George Wallace, who took 193,098 votes and 18.29 percent of the vote.

With his victory in the state, Nixon became the first Republican presidential candidate to carry Kentucky more than once, as he also carried the state in his unsuccessful bid in 1960.

== Results ==
1968 United States presidential election in Kentucky
Party	Candidate	Votes	%
Republican	Richard Nixon	462,411	43.79
Democratic	Hubert Humphrey	397,541	37.65
American	George Wallace	193,098	18.29
Socialist Workers	Fred Halstead	2,843	0.27
Total votes		1,055,893	100.00

=== Results by county ===
County	Richard Nixon Republican		Hubert Humphrey Democratic		George Wallace American		Fred Halstead Socialist Workers		Margin		Total votes cast
County	#	%	#	%	#	%	#	%	#	%	Total votes cast
Adair	3,239	59.43%	1,362	24.99%	844	15.49%	5	0.09%	1,877	34.44%	5,450
Allen	2,952	61.63%	927	19.35%	905	18.89%	6	0.13%	2,025	42.28%	4,790
Anderson	1,594	44.33%	1,334	37.10%	657	18.27%	11	0.31%	260	7.23%	3,596
Ballard	564	16.38%	1,632	47.39%	1,197	34.76%	51	1.48%	435 (Note: In this county where Nixon ran third behind Humphrey and Wallace, margin given is Humphrey vote minus Wallace vote and percentage margin Humphrey percentage minus Wallace percentage.)	12.63%	3,444
Barren	4,209	42.84%	3,464	35.25%	2,140	21.78%	13	0.13%	745	7.59%	9,826
Bath	1,277	38.34%	1,394	41.85%	658	19.75%	2	0.06%	-117	-3.51%	3,331
Bell	4,905	47.74%	4,138	40.27%	1,204	11.72%	28	0.27%	767	7.47%	10,275
Boone	4,081	45.09%	2,725	30.11%	2,240	24.75%	5	0.06%	1,356	14.98%	9,051
Bourbon	1,848	33.85%	2,566	47.00%	1,023	18.74%	23	0.42%	-718	-13.15%	5,460
Boyd	8,632	45.43%	7,914	41.65%	2,443	12.86%	12	0.06%	718	3.78%	19,001
Boyle	2,715	40.29%	2,663	39.52%	1,356	20.12%	4	0.06%	52	0.77%	6,738
Bracken	1,115	40.81%	1,067	39.06%	548	20.06%	2	0.07%	48	1.75%	2,732
Breathitt	1,361	29.09%	2,954	63.15%	361	7.72%	2	0.04%	-1,593	-34.06%	4,678
Breckinridge	2,779	47.32%	2,024	34.46%	1,067	18.17%	3	0.05%	755	12.86%	5,873
Bullitt	1,965	31.14%	2,135	33.84%	2,180	34.55%	30	0.48%	-45	-0.71%	6,310
Butler	2,637	66.47%	691	17.42%	634	15.98%	5	0.13%	1,946	49.05%	3,967
Caldwell	2,139	42.23%	1,439	28.41%	1,426	28.15%	61	1.20%	700	13.82%	5,065
Calloway	2,672	30.78%	3,854	44.39%	2,150	24.76%	6	0.07%	-1,182	-13.61%	8,682
Campbell	13,681	48.51%	9,747	34.56%	4,750	16.84%	25	0.09%	3,934	13.95%	28,203
Carlisle	479	19.65%	1,144	46.92%	807	33.10%	8	0.33%	337	13.82%	2,438
Carroll	868	27.54%	1,765	56.00%	514	16.31%	5	0.16%	-897	-28.46%	3,152
Carter	3,234	49.67%	2,344	36.00%	926	14.22%	7	0.11%	890	13.67%	6,511
Casey	3,698	70.64%	879	16.79%	649	12.40%	9	0.17%	2,819	53.85%	5,235
Christian	3,788	30.03%	4,281	33.94%	4,527	35.89%	18	0.14%	-246	-1.95%	12,614
Clark	2,698	39.63%	2,385	35.03%	1,722	25.29%	3	0.04%	313	4.60%	6,808
Clay	4,663	75.16%	1,213	19.55%	327	5.27%	1	0.02%	3,450	55.61%	6,204
Clinton	2,572	75.09%	568	16.58%	280	8.18%	5	0.15%	2,004	58.51%	3,425
Crittenden	1,942	54.97%	838	23.72%	748	21.17%	5	0.14%	1,104	31.25%	3,533
Cumberland	2,116	67.82%	646	20.71%	355	11.38%	3	0.10%	1,470	47.11%	3,120
Daviess	10,111	40.22%	9,947	39.56%	5,015	19.95%	69	0.27%	164	0.66%	25,142
Edmonson	2,280	65.44%	679	19.49%	516	14.81%	9	0.26%	1,601	45.95%	3,484
Elliott	515	23.56%	1,387	63.45%	280	12.81%	4	0.18%	-872	-39.89%	2,186
Estill	2,236	53.57%	1,261	30.21%	675	16.17%	2	0.05%	975	23.36%	4,174
Fayette	24,948	49.53%	16,902	33.55%	8,354	16.58%	169	0.34%	8,046	15.98%	50,373
Fleming	2,220	53.28%	1,406	33.74%	535	12.84%	6	0.14%	814	19.54%	4,167
Floyd	3,550	27.22%	8,333	63.89%	1,150	8.82%	10	0.08%	-4,783	-36.67%	13,043
Franklin	4,057	30.82%	6,396	48.58%	2,655	20.17%	57	0.43%	-2,339	-17.76%	13,165
Fulton	1,079	28.26%	1,204	31.53%	1,526	39.97%	9	0.24%	-322	-8.44%	3,818
Gallatin	413	29.35%	685	48.69%	304	21.61%	5	0.36%	-272	-19.34%	1,407
Garrard	2,205	56.15%	1,000	25.46%	675	17.19%	47	1.20%	1,205	30.69%	3,927
Grant	1,386	39.35%	1,169	33.19%	941	26.72%	26	0.74%	217	6.16%	3,522
Graves	3,239	26.52%	5,103	41.78%	3,829	31.35%	42	0.34%	1,274	10.43%	12,213
Grayson	3,598	61.14%	1,595	27.10%	657	11.16%	35	0.59%	2,003	34.04%	5,885
Green	2,448	58.71%	1,003	24.05%	712	17.07%	7	0.17%	1,445	34.66%	4,170
Greenup	4,698	43.68%	4,689	43.60%	1,365	12.69%	3	0.03%	9	0.08%	10,755
Hancock	1,049	44.70%	867	36.94%	419	17.85%	12	0.51%	182	7.76%	2,347
Hardin	5,329	41.84%	4,470	35.09%	2,845	22.34%	93	0.73%	859	6.75%	12,737
Harlan	4,572	34.96%	6,389	48.86%	2,099	16.05%	17	0.13%	-1,817	-13.90%	13,077
Harrison	1,637	33.75%	2,373	48.93%	839	17.30%	1	0.02%	-736	-15.18%	4,850
Hart	2,817	51.37%	1,658	30.23%	1,002	18.27%	7	0.13%	1,159	21.14%	5,484
Henderson	3,512	32.74%	5,062	47.19%	2,132	19.88%	20	0.19%	-1,550	-14.45%	10,726
Henry	1,271	32.04%	1,978	49.86%	711	17.92%	7	0.18%	-707	-17.82%	3,967
Hickman	623	23.19%	880	32.76%	1,154	42.96%	29	1.08%	-274	-10.20%	2,686
Hopkins	3,791	31.94%	4,391	37.00%	3,668	30.90%	19	0.16%	-600	-5.06%	11,869
Jackson	3,098	84.09%	304	8.25%	279	7.57%	3	0.08%	2,794	75.84%	3,684
Jefferson	95,942	43.09%	90,242	40.53%	35,561	15.97%	912	0.41%	5,700	2.56%	222,657
Jessamine	2,338	45.46%	1,334	25.94%	1,440	28.00%	31	0.60%	898 (Note: In this county where Humphrey ran third behind Nixon and Wallace, margin given is Nixon vote minus Wallace vote and percentage margin Nixon percentage minus Wallace percentage.)	17.46%	5,143
Johnson	4,046	61.90%	2,142	32.77%	344	5.26%	4	0.06%	1,904	29.13%	6,536
Kenton	17,263	43.64%	14,656	37.05%	7,612	19.24%	26	0.07%	2,607	6.59%	39,557
Knott	1,098	22.56%	3,335	68.52%	428	8.79%	6	0.12%	-2,237	-45.96%	4,867
Knox	4,388	57.77%	2,244	29.55%	944	12.43%	19	0.25%	2,144	28.22%	7,595
LaRue	1,862	47.78%	1,251	32.10%	776	19.91%	8	0.21%	611	15.68%	3,897
Laurel	6,251	67.57%	1,756	18.98%	1,236	13.36%	8	0.09%	4,495	48.59%	9,251
Lawrence	1,946	45.80%	1,825	42.95%	476	11.20%	2	0.05%	121	2.85%	4,249
Lee	1,339	58.27%	674	29.33%	285	12.40%	0	0.00%	665	28.94%	2,298
Leslie	2,615	71.08%	828	22.51%	236	6.41%	0	0.00%	1,787	48.57%	3,679
Letcher	3,243	42.30%	3,499	45.64%	920	12.00%	5	0.07%	-256	-3.34%	7,667
Lewis	2,760	64.83%	1,017	23.89%	472	11.09%	8	0.19%	1,743	40.94%	4,257
Lincoln	2,591	47.45%	1,736	31.79%	1,129	20.67%	5	0.09%	855	15.66%	5,461
Livingston	1,079	32.63%	1,272	38.46%	953	28.82%	3	0.09%	-193	-5.83%	3,307
Logan	3,402	39.16%	3,339	38.44%	1,881	21.65%	65	0.75%	63	0.72%	8,687
Lyon	579	29.88%	719	37.10%	619	31.94%	21	1.08%	100	5.16%	1,938
Madison	5,325	44.83%	3,884	32.70%	2,558	21.54%	111	0.93%	1,441	12.13%	11,878
Magoffin	1,967	47.71%	1,927	46.74%	229	5.55%	0	0.00%	40	0.97%	4,123
Marion	1,620	33.02%	2,436	49.65%	849	17.31%	1	0.02%	-816	-16.63%	4,906
Marshall	2,432	30.70%	3,301	41.67%	2,183	27.56%	5	0.06%	-869	-10.97%	7,921
Martin	1,943	68.42%	759	26.73%	136	4.79%	2	0.07%	1,184	41.69%	2,840
Mason	2,661	40.50%	2,772	42.19%	1,131	17.21%	6	0.09%	-111	-1.69%	6,570
McCracken	5,887	27.33%	9,741	45.21%	5,810	26.97%	106	0.49%	-3,854	-17.88%	21,544
McCreary	2,670	67.61%	759	19.22%	479	12.13%	41	1.04%	1,911	48.39%	3,949
McLean	1,372	35.73%	1,373	35.76%	1,084	28.23%	11	0.29%	-1	-0.03%	3,840
Meade	1,385	32.98%	1,926	45.86%	886	21.10%	3	0.07%	-541	-12.88%	4,200
Menifee	509	38.65%	554	42.07%	247	18.75%	7	0.53%	-45	-3.42%	1,317
Mercer	2,432	43.07%	1,950	34.54%	1,227	21.73%	37	0.66%	482	8.53%	5,646
Metcalfe	1,566	51.41%	1,001	32.86%	469	15.40%	10	0.33%	565	18.55%	3,046
Monroe	4,086	76.06%	693	12.90%	590	10.98%	3	0.06%	3,393	63.16%	5,372
Montgomery	2,113	46.87%	1,408	31.23%	980	21.74%	7	0.16%	705	15.64%	4,508
Morgan	1,341	33.86%	2,222	56.10%	398	10.05%	0	0.00%	-881	-22.24%	3,961
Muhlenberg	3,853	39.52%	3,688	37.83%	2,198	22.54%	11	0.11%	165	1.69%	9,750
Nelson	2,373	34.31%	3,420	49.45%	1,104	15.96%	19	0.27%	-1,047	-15.14%	6,916
Nicholas	725	35.16%	911	44.18%	413	20.03%	13	0.63%	-186	-9.02%	2,062
Ohio	3,504	54.16%	1,695	26.20%	1,263	19.52%	8	0.12%	1,809	27.96%	6,470
Oldham	1,655	41.45%	1,399	35.04%	937	23.47%	2	0.05%	256	6.41%	3,993
Owen	827	26.39%	1,608	51.31%	697	22.24%	2	0.06%	-781	-24.92%	3,134
Owsley	1,417	75.49%	303	16.14%	157	8.36%	0	0.00%	1,114	59.35%	1,877
Pendleton	1,614	45.68%	1,156	32.72%	760	21.51%	3	0.08%	458	12.96%	3,533
Perry	3,993	41.85%	4,562	47.81%	983	10.30%	3	0.03%	-569	-5.96%	9,541
Pike	8,911	39.56%	11,663	51.78%	1,933	8.58%	19	0.08%	-2,752	-12.22%	22,526
Powell	1,157	42.57%	934	34.36%	625	22.99%	2	0.07%	223	8.21%	2,718
Pulaski	8,290	64.26%	2,823	21.88%	1,780	13.80%	8	0.06%	5,467	42.38%	12,901
Robertson	416	41.15%	406	40.16%	186	18.40%	3	0.30%	10	0.99%	1,011
Rockcastle	3,072	66.96%	868	18.92%	644	14.04%	4	0.09%	2,204	48.04%	4,588
Rowan	2,017	45.23%	1,898	42.57%	541	12.13%	3	0.07%	119	2.66%	4,459
Russell	3,035	64.29%	961	20.36%	718	15.21%	7	0.15%	2,074	43.93%	4,721
Scott	1,748	35.07%	1,961	39.35%	1,242	24.92%	33	0.66%	-213	-4.28%	4,984
Shelby	2,287	37.78%	2,579	42.60%	1,185	19.57%	3	0.05%	-292	-4.82%	6,054
Simpson	1,435	33.07%	1,505	34.69%	1,390	32.04%	9	0.21%	-70	-1.62%	4,339
Spencer	733	41.89%	564	32.23%	448	25.60%	5	0.29%	169	9.66%	1,750
Taylor	3,032	50.88%	1,367	22.94%	1,554	26.08%	6	0.10%	1,478	24.80%	5,959
Todd	1,433	31.99%	1,082	24.16%	1,932	43.13%	32	0.71%	-499	-11.14%	4,479
Trigg	1,100	30.38%	1,330	36.73%	1,180	32.59%	11	0.30%	150	4.14%	3,621
Trimble	511	25.98%	1,045	53.13%	406	20.64%	5	0.25%	-534	-27.15%	1,967
Union	1,371	23.66%	2,616	45.15%	1,804	31.14%	3	0.05%	812	14.01%	5,794
Warren	8,084	45.76%	5,200	29.44%	4,365	24.71%	16	0.09%	2,884	16.32%	17,665
Washington	1,863	46.35%	1,675	41.68%	472	11.74%	9	0.22%	188	4.67%	4,019
Wayne	3,055	61.08%	1,467	29.33%	475	9.50%	5	0.10%	1,588	31.75%	5,002
Webster	1,446	29.48%	2,114	43.10%	1,337	27.26%	8	0.16%	-668	-13.62%	4,905
Whitley	5,639	59.74%	2,134	22.61%	1,650	17.48%	16	0.17%	3,505	37.13%	9,439
Wolfe	758	34.35%	1,162	52.65%	282	12.78%	5	0.23%	-404	-18.30%	2,207
Woodford	1,901	42.51%	1,646	36.81%	894	19.99%	31	0.69%	255	5.70%	4,472
Totals	462,411	43.79%	397,541	37.65%	193,098	18.29%	2,843	0.27%	64,870	6.14%	1,055,893

==== Counties that flipped from Democratic to Republican ====
- Anderson
- Barren
- Boone
- Bell
- Boyd
- Boyle
- Bracken
- Breckinridge
- Carter
- Caldwell
- Campbell
- Clark
- Daviess
- Estill
- Fayette
- Fleming
- Garrard
- Grant
- Green
- Greenup
- Hancock
- Hardin
- Hart
- Jefferson
- Jessamine
- Kenton
- Knox
- LaRue
- Lawrence
- Lee
- Lincoln
- Logan
- Madison
- Magoffin
- Martin
- Metcalfe
- Mercer
- Montgomery
- Muhlenberg
- Ohio
- Oldham
- Pendleton
- Powell
- Robertson
- Rowan
- Spencer
- Taylor
- Warren
- Washington
- Woodford
- Wayne
- Whitley

==== Counties that flipped from Democratic to American Independent ====
- Bullitt
- Christian
- Fulton
- Hickman
- Todd

=== Results by congressional district ===
Out of Kentucky's 7 congressional districts Nixon won a majority or plurality in 4 of them while Humphrey won 3 congressional districts.

District	Nixon	Humphrey	Wallace
1st	32.3%	39.1%	28.7%
2nd	44.2%	35%	20.8%
3rd	39.3%	46%	14.7%
4th	46.8%	34.2%	19%
5th	60.3%	25.9%	13.8%
6th	42.7%	37.7%	19.6%
7th	42.5%	46.9%	10.7%
