= 1896 United States presidential election in Kentucky =

- November 3, 1896

Nominee	William McKinley	William Jennings Bryan
Party	Republican	Democratic
Home state	Ohio	Nebraska
Running mate	Garret Hobart	Arthur Sewall
Electoral vote	12	1
Popular vote	218,171	217,890
Percentage	48.93%	48.86%
County results
McKinley
40–50%
50–60%
60–70%
70–80%
80–90%
90–100%
Bryan
40–50%
50–60%
60–70%
70–80%
President before election
Grover Cleveland
Democratic
Elected President
William McKinley
Republican

The 1896 United States presidential election in Kentucky took place on November 3, 1896. All contemporary 45 states were part of the 1896 United States presidential election. Voters chose 13 electors to the Electoral College, which selected the president and vice president.

Kentucky was won by the Republican nominees, former Ohio Governor William McKinley and his running mate Garret Hobart of New Jersey. They defeated the Democratic and Populist nominees, former Nebraska Representative William Jennings Bryan and his running mate Arthur Sewall of Maine. McKinley won the state by a very narrow margin of 0.07%.

As a result of his win, McKinley became the first Republican presidential candidate to ever win Kentucky. He would also be the only Republican presidential candidate to win the state until Calvin Coolidge in 1924.

Ever since the Civil War, Kentucky had been shaped politically by divisions created by that war between secessionist, Democratic counties and Unionist, Republican ones, although the state as a whole leaned Democratic throughout this era and the GOP would never carry the state during the Third Party System. However, the Democratic Party in the state was heavily divided over free silver and the role of corporations in the middle 1890s, and it lost the governorship for the first time in forty years in 1895 due to Populist defections. For the 1896 election, the Democratic Party would aim to fuse with the Populists, and adopted the Populist free silver platform under former Nebraska Representative William Jennings Bryan.

In contrast to the majority of antebellum slave states, and despite the majority of the state's economy being an agricultural one revolving around tobacco, Kentucky was sufficiently close to the industrial Northeast that it had a significant urban working class in its Ohio River cities that opposed free silver because it would cause inflation. Similar views were held by workers in Kentucky's developing coal mining industry. Polls late in October nonetheless showed Bryan carrying the state by a margin only slightly reduced from what discredited incumbent President Grover Cleveland had achieved in 1892. A week later, however, polls had McKinley and Hobart carrying Kentucky by seventeen thousand votes. As it turned out, the state was exceedingly close, with McKinley becoming the first Republican presidential candidate to carry Kentucky, by a mere 281 votes, or 0.06301%. Owing to the direct election of presidential electors and the extreme closeness of the result, one Bryan elector and twelve McKinley electors were chosen.

McKinley's victory is, by percentage margin, the seventh-closest popular results for presidential electors on record. (Note: The closer ones, beginning with the closest, are Florida in 2000, Maryland in 1832, Maryland in 1904, California in 1912, California in 1892 and Hawaii in 1960.)

McKinley would later lose Kentucky to Bryan four years later and Bryan would later win the state again in 1908 against William Howard Taft.

== Results ==
General Election Results
Party	Pledged to	Elector	Votes
Republican	William McKinley	S. H. Kash	218,171
Democratic	William Jennings Bryan	W. B. Smith	217,890
Republican	William McKinley	H. G. Trimble	215,458
Republican	William McKinley	O. S. Deming	215,431
Republican	William McKinley	J. Frank Taylor	215,426
Republican	William McKinley	Charles F. Stiglitz	215,423
Republican	William McKinley	George H. Towery	215,418 (Note: There is some disagreement on Towery's total. Early newspaper reports gave it as 215,438 while the full report in the 12/21/1896 Courier-Journal gives it as 215,408. However, the district totals listed in Courier-Journal add up to 215,418 and the county results match up to the district results.)
Republican	William McKinley	John H. Bosley	215,415
Republican	William McKinley	N. D. Miles	215,409
Republican	William McKinley	W. S. Mason	215,408
Republican	William McKinley	David B. Wallace	215,407
Republican	William McKinley	J. B. Wilhoit	215,404
Republican	William McKinley	J. S. R. Wedding	215,402 (Note: Since Wedding and Howes tied, the 12 uncontested electors chose Wedding over Howes by a vote of 10-2 to be the 13th elector.)
Republican	William McKinley	H. S. Howes	215,402
Democratic	William Jennings Bryan	James P. Tarvin	215,091
Democratic	William Jennings Bryan	J. C. Flournoy	215,073
Democratic	William Jennings Bryan	Henry F. Turner	215,053
Democratic	William Jennings Bryan	W. R. Browder	215,048
Democratic	William Jennings Bryan	Wallace McKay	215,045
Democratic	William Jennings Bryan	Gus Brown	215,043
Democratic	William Jennings Bryan	Robert J. Breckinridge	215,032
Democratic	William Jennings Bryan	Harvey Myers	215,022
Democratic	William Jennings Bryan	W. G. Ramsey	215,021
Democratic	William Jennings Bryan	Thomas J. Wells	215,013
Democratic	William Jennings Bryan	Robert B. Franklin	214,995
Democratic	William Jennings Bryan	Henry Beauchamp	214,943
National Sound Money	John M. Palmer	J. Q. Ward	5,108 (Note: The stated total for Ward is 5,114 but this appears to be a mistake. The sum of the district totals is 5,108 and the county data matches the district totals exactly.)
National Sound Money	John M. Palmer	R. N. Wathen	5,019
National Sound Money	John M. Palmer	R. T. Tyler	5,009
National Sound Money	John M. Palmer	George Givens	5,006
National Sound Money	John M. Palmer	Thomas W. Bullitt	5,004
National Sound Money	John M. Palmer	J. C. Sims	5,004
National Sound Money	John M. Palmer	J. C. Speight	5,003
National Sound Money	John M. Palmer	C. M. Alberti	5,001
National Sound Money	John M. Palmer	W. B. Snyder	5,000
National Sound Money	John M. Palmer	John F. Wight	4,999
National Sound Money	John M. Palmer	E. B. Wilhoit	4,999
National Sound Money	John M. Palmer	W. W. McGuire	4,998
National Sound Money	John M. Palmer	H. C. Baker	4,991
Prohibition	Joshua Levering	T. B. Demaree	4,781
Prohibition	Joshua Levering	R. S. Eastin	4,530
Prohibition	Joshua Levering	Josiah Harris	4,530
Prohibition	Joshua Levering	J. N. Likens	4,526
Prohibition	Joshua Levering	J. R. Pile	4,526
Prohibition	Joshua Levering	Crit G. Hughes	4,525
Prohibition	Joshua Levering	Simon H. Demaree	4,524
Prohibition	Joshua Levering	George F. Clark	4,523
Prohibition	Joshua Levering	R. L. Garrison	4,523
Prohibition	Joshua Levering	Bradford McGregor	4,523
Prohibition	Joshua Levering	R. B. Neal	4,521
Prohibition	Joshua Levering	O. T. Wallace	4,521
Prohibition	Joshua Levering	R. S. Friend	4,520
Votes cast (Note: Based on highest elector on each ticket)			445,928

=== Results by county ===
County	William McKinley Republican		William Jennings Bryan Democratic		John M. Palmer Sound Money		Joshua Levering Prohibition		Margin		Total votes cast
County	#	%	#	%	#	%	#	%	#	%	Total votes cast
Adair	1,612	53.40%	1,345	44.55%	40	1.32%	22	0.73%	267	8.84%	3,019
Allen	1,595	51.45%	1,460	47.10%	13	0.42%	32	1.03%	135	4.35%	3,100
Anderson	1,151	46.06%	1,286	51.46%	45	1.80%	17	0.68%	-135	-5.40%	2,499
Ballard	495	22.41%	1,670	75.60%	9	0.41%	35	1.58%	-1,175	-53.19%	2,209
Barren	2,092	40.25%	3,006	57.84%	43	0.83%	56	1.08%	-914	-17.59%	5,197
Bath	1,579	45.98%	1,791	52.15%	23	0.67%	41	1.19%	-212	-6.17%	3,434
Bell	1,900	74.54%	615	24.13%	21	0.82%	13	0.51%	1,285	50.41%	2,549
Boone	781	24.83%	2,317	73.65%	13	0.41%	35	1.11%	-1,536	-48.82%	3,146
Bourbon	2,578	52.76%	2,210	45.23%	58	1.19%	40	0.82%	368	7.53%	4,886
Boyd	2,087	61.26%	1,241	36.43%	35	1.03%	44	1.29%	846	24.83%	3,407
Boyle	1,687	56.25%	1,206	40.21%	71	2.37%	35	1.17%	481	16.04%	2,999
Bracken	1,226	40.21%	1,762	57.79%	14	0.46%	47	1.54%	-536	-17.58%	3,049
Breathitt	776	38.92%	1,204	60.38%	5	0.25%	9	0.45%	-428	-21.46%	1,994
Breckinridge	2,274	49.76%	2,202	48.18%	43	0.94%	51	1.12%	72	1.58%	4,570
Bullitt	799	39.01%	1,168	57.03%	55	2.69%	26	1.27%	-369	-18.02%	2,048
Butler	1,907	61.50%	1,139	36.73%	16	0.52%	39	1.26%	768	24.77%	3,101
Caldwell	1,544	49.66%	1,530	49.21%	24	0.77%	11	0.35%	14	0.45%	3,109
Calloway	561	17.38%	2,572	79.70%	9	0.28%	85	2.63%	-2,011	-62.32%	3,227
Campbell	5,821	56.72%	4,304	41.94%	36	0.35%	102	0.99%	1,517	14.78%	10,263
Carlisle	390	18.68%	1,624	77.78%	16	0.77%	58	2.78%	-1,234	-59.10%	2,088
Carroll	685	27.19%	1,778	70.58%	26	1.03%	30	1.19%	-1,093	-43.39%	2,519
Carter	2,440	58.46%	1,665	39.89%	39	0.93%	30	0.72%	775	18.57%	4,174
Casey	1,643	59.46%	1,061	38.40%	26	0.94%	33	1.19%	582	21.06%	2,763
Christian	4,525	57.87%	3,145	40.22%	66	0.84%	83	1.06%	1,380	17.65%	7,819
Clark	2,032	48.17%	2,055	48.72%	98	2.32%	33	0.78%	-23	-0.55%	4,218
Clay	1,725	69.98%	707	28.68%	7	0.28%	26	1.05%	1,018	41.30%	2,465
Clinton	1,004	72.44%	360	25.97%	11	0.79%	11	0.79%	644	46.46%	1,386
Crittenden	1,574	49.59%	1,576	49.65%	9	0.28%	15	0.47%	-2	-0.06%	3,174
Cumberland	1,154	64.25%	621	34.58%	12	0.67%	9	0.50%	533	29.68%	1,796
Daviess	3,105	37.28%	4,952	59.46%	122	1.46%	149	1.79%	-1,847	-22.18%	8,328
Edmonson	952	51.88%	863	47.03%	8	0.44%	12	0.65%	89	4.85%	1,835
Elliott	577	30.56%	1,294	68.54%	3	0.16%	14	0.74%	-717	-37.98%	1,888
Estill	1,153	55.04%	929	44.34%	9	0.43%	4	0.19%	224	10.69%	2,095
Fayette	5,143	55.54%	3,938	42.53%	89	0.96%	90	0.97%	1,205	13.01%	9,260
Fleming	1,935	47.97%	2,013	49.90%	51	1.26%	35	0.87%	-78	-1.93%	4,034
Floyd	1,057	42.50%	1,410	56.69%	5	0.20%	15	0.60%	-353	-14.19%	2,487
Franklin	2,175	45.77%	2,465	51.87%	84	1.77%	28	0.59%	-290	-6.10%	4,752
Fulton	603	28.70%	1,414	67.30%	47	2.24%	37	1.76%	-811	-38.60%	2,101
Gallatin	396	29.44%	933	69.37%	8	0.59%	8	0.59%	-537	-39.93%	1,345
Garrard	1,595	55.61%	1,171	40.83%	45	1.57%	57	1.99%	424	14.78%	2,868
Grant	1,417	42.41%	1,852	55.43%	35	1.05%	37	1.11%	-435	-13.02%	3,341
Graves	1,628	25.15%	4,699	72.58%	53	0.82%	94	1.45%	-3,071	-47.44%	6,474
Grayson	1,874	47.73%	2,002	50.99%	31	0.79%	19	0.48%	-128	-3.26%	3,926
Green	1,389	54.36%	1,142	44.70%	17	0.67%	7	0.27%	247	9.67%	2,555
Greenup	1,802	55.65%	1,369	42.28%	15	0.46%	52	1.61%	433	13.37%	3,238
Hancock	1,026	48.08%	1,080	50.61%	13	0.61%	15	0.70%	-54	-2.53%	2,134
Hardin	1,885	38.68%	2,848	58.44%	58	1.19%	82	1.68%	-963	-19.76%	4,873
Harlan	1,189	83.15%	216	15.10%	11	0.77%	14	0.98%	973	68.04%	1,430
Harrison	1,705	37.66%	2,690	59.42%	61	1.35%	71	1.57%	-985	-21.76%	4,527
Hart	1,999	49.59%	1,951	48.40%	62	1.54%	19	0.47%	48	1.19%	4,031
Henderson	2,750	40.05%	4,000	58.25%	69	1.00%	44	0.64%	-1,250	-18.20%	6,867
Henry	1,711	43.24%	2,115	53.45%	92	2.32%	39	0.99%	-404	-10.21%	3,957
Hickman	727	26.53%	1,928	70.36%	26	0.95%	59	2.15%	-1,201	-43.83%	2,740
Hopkins	2,490	41.14%	3,470	57.34%	54	0.89%	38	0.63%	-980	-16.19%	6,052
Jackson	1,517	87.79%	189	10.94%	15	0.87%	7	0.41%	1,328	76.85%	1,728
Jefferson	29,107	61.57%	16,707	35.34%	1,078	2.28%	380	0.80%	12,400	26.23%	47,272
Jessamine	1,343	46.53%	1,428	49.48%	48	1.66%	67	2.32%	-85	-2.95%	2,886
Johnson	1,794	64.07%	975	34.82%	12	0.43%	19	0.68%	819	29.25%	2,800
Kenton	6,165	46.28%	7,008	52.60%	41	0.31%	108	0.81%	-843	-6.33%	13,322
Knott	404	33.50%	795	65.92%	3	0.25%	4	0.33%	-391	-32.42%	1,206
Knox	2,237	71.93%	833	26.78%	15	0.48%	25	0.80%	1,404	45.14%	3,110
Larue	955	41.49%	1,324	57.52%	10	0.43%	13	0.56%	-369	-16.03%	2,302
Laurel	1,921	64.48%	969	32.53%	41	1.38%	48	1.61%	952	31.96%	2,979
Lawrence	1,966	51.39%	1,820	47.57%	22	0.58%	18	0.47%	146	3.82%	3,826
Lee	881	59.09%	587	39.37%	12	0.80%	11	0.74%	294	19.72%	1,491
Leslie	913	91.39%	81	8.11%	3	0.30%	2	0.20%	832	83.28%	999
Letcher	813	66.58%	388	31.78%	11	0.90%	9	0.74%	425	34.81%	1,221
Lewis	2,348	61.29%	1,433	37.41%	20	0.52%	30	0.78%	915	23.88%	3,831
Lincoln	1,833	50.27%	1,628	44.65%	61	1.67%	124	3.40%	205	5.62%	3,646
Livingston	872	38.41%	1,346	59.30%	48	2.11%	4	0.18%	-474	-20.88%	2,270
Logan	2,484	42.09%	3,266	55.34%	91	1.54%	61	1.03%	-782	-13.25%	5,902
Lyon	763	42.84%	969	54.41%	24	1.35%	25	1.40%	-206	-11.57%	1,781
Madison	3,100	51.69%	2,756	45.96%	74	1.23%	67	1.12%	344	5.74%	5,997
Magoffin	1,148	57.46%	833	41.69%	4	0.20%	13	0.65%	315	15.77%	1,998
Marion	1,575	45.03%	1,873	53.54%	42	1.20%	8	0.23%	-298	-8.52%	3,498
Marshall	568	22.21%	1,926	75.32%	16	0.63%	47	1.84%	-1,358	-53.11%	2,557
Martin	730	75.73%	227	23.55%	4	0.41%	3	0.31%	503	52.18%	964
Mason	2,575	48.16%	2,698	50.46%	32	0.60%	42	0.79%	-123	-2.30%	5,347
McCracken	2,284	42.62%	2,955	55.14%	31	0.58%	89	1.66%	-671	-12.52%	5,359
McLean	935	38.97%	1,389	57.90%	25	1.04%	50	2.08%	-454	-18.92%	2,399
Meade	781	33.35%	1,519	64.86%	30	1.28%	12	0.51%	-738	-31.51%	2,342
Menifee	359	35.58%	636	63.03%	4	0.40%	10	0.99%	-277	-27.45%	1,009
Mercer	1,765	48.33%	1,745	47.78%	91	2.49%	51	1.40%	20	0.55%	3,652
Metcalfe	1,153	54.21%	908	42.69%	33	1.55%	33	1.55%	245	11.52%	2,127
Monroe	1,613	66.16%	794	32.57%	18	0.74%	13	0.53%	819	33.59%	2,438
Montgomery	1,484	47.32%	1,624	51.79%	35	1.12%	24	0.77%	-140	-4.46%	3,136
Morgan	910	35.27%	1,642	63.64%	11	0.43%	17	0.66%	-732	-28.37%	2,580
Muhlenberg	2,217	55.20%	1,700	42.33%	49	1.22%	50	1.25%	517	12.87%	4,016
Nelson	1,446	38.66%	2,223	59.44%	46	1.23%	25	0.67%	-777	-20.78%	3,740
Nicholas	1,159	37.28%	1,878	60.41%	19	0.61%	53	1.70%	-719	-23.13%	3,109
Ohio	2,653	48.16%	2,679	48.63%	58	1.05%	119	2.16%	-26	-0.47%	5,509
Oldham	691	40.48%	946	55.42%	46	2.69%	24	1.41%	-255	-14.94%	1,707
Owen	1,086	23.94%	3,373	74.34%	38	0.84%	40	0.88%	-2,287	-50.41%	4,537
Owsley	983	82.12%	197	16.46%	12	1.00%	5	0.42%	786	65.66%	1,197
Pendleton	1,585	44.11%	1,939	53.97%	26	0.72%	43	1.20%	-354	-9.85%	3,593
Perry	824	68.84%	340	28.40%	27	2.26%	6	0.50%	484	40.43%	1,197
Pike	2,141	52.57%	1,900	46.65%	13	0.32%	19	0.47%	241	5.92%	4,073
Powell	625	46.61%	688	51.30%	14	1.04%	14	1.04%	-63	-4.70%	1,341
Pulaski	3,668	62.48%	2,099	35.75%	58	0.99%	46	0.78%	1,569	26.72%	5,871
Robertson	449	39.49%	666	58.58%	3	0.26%	19	1.67%	-217	-19.09%	1,137
Rockcastle	1,480	62.63%	846	35.80%	16	0.68%	21	0.89%	634	26.83%	2,363
Rowan	767	53.01%	650	44.92%	10	0.69%	20	1.38%	117	8.09%	1,447
Russell	1,038	60.95%	612	35.94%	37	2.17%	16	0.94%	426	25.01%	1,703
Scott	2,111	47.11%	2,237	49.92%	61	1.36%	72	1.61%	-126	-2.81%	4,481
Shelby	2,029	42.92%	2,524	53.40%	122	2.58%	52	1.10%	-495	-10.47%	4,727
Simpson	888	35.27%	1,531	60.80%	31	1.23%	63	2.50%	-643	-25.54%	2,518
Spencer	596	37.23%	969	60.52%	21	1.31%	15	0.94%	-373	-23.30%	1,601
Taylor	1,050	46.60%	1,166	51.75%	24	1.07%	13	0.58%	-116	-5.15%	2,253
Todd	1,793	49.26%	1,707	46.90%	72	1.98%	68	1.87%	86	2.36%	3,640
Trigg	1,295	43.44%	1,633	54.78%	28	0.94%	25	0.84%	-338	-11.34%	2,981
Trimble	418	23.93%	1,267	72.52%	32	1.83%	30	1.72%	-849	-48.60%	1,747
Union	1,249	27.55%	3,183	70.22%	43	0.95%	58	1.28%	-1,934	-42.66%	4,533
Warren	2,866	41.96%	3,716	54.41%	97	1.42%	151	2.21%	-850	-12.45%	6,830
Washington	1,573	49.51%	1,536	48.35%	38	1.20%	30	0.94%	37	1.16%	3,177
Wayne	1,413	53.44%	1,190	45.01%	17	0.64%	24	0.91%	223	8.43%	2,644
Webster	1,484	37.16%	2,471	61.87%	21	0.53%	18	0.45%	-987	-24.71%	3,994
Whitley	3,130	77.02%	862	21.21%	29	0.71%	43	1.06%	2,268	55.81%	4,064
Wolfe	583	36.69%	981	61.74%	12	0.76%	13	0.82%	-398	-25.05%	1,589
Woodford	1,665	50.64%	1,546	47.02%	32	0.97%	45	1.37%	119	3.62%	3,288
Totals	218,171	48.93%	217,890	48.86%	5,108	1.15%	4,781	1.07%	281	0.06%	445,928

==== Counties that flipped from Democratic to Republican ====
- Allen
- Bourbon
- Boyd
- Boyle
- Breckinridge
- Campbell
- Fayette
- Hart
- Jefferson
- Lawrence
- Lincoln
- Madison
- Mercer
- Pike
- Todd
- Washington
- Woodford

==== Counties that flipped from Republican to Democratic ====
- Crittenden

== See also ==
- United States presidential elections in Kentucky
