= Hickman County, Kentucky =

County in Kentucky, United States

- County
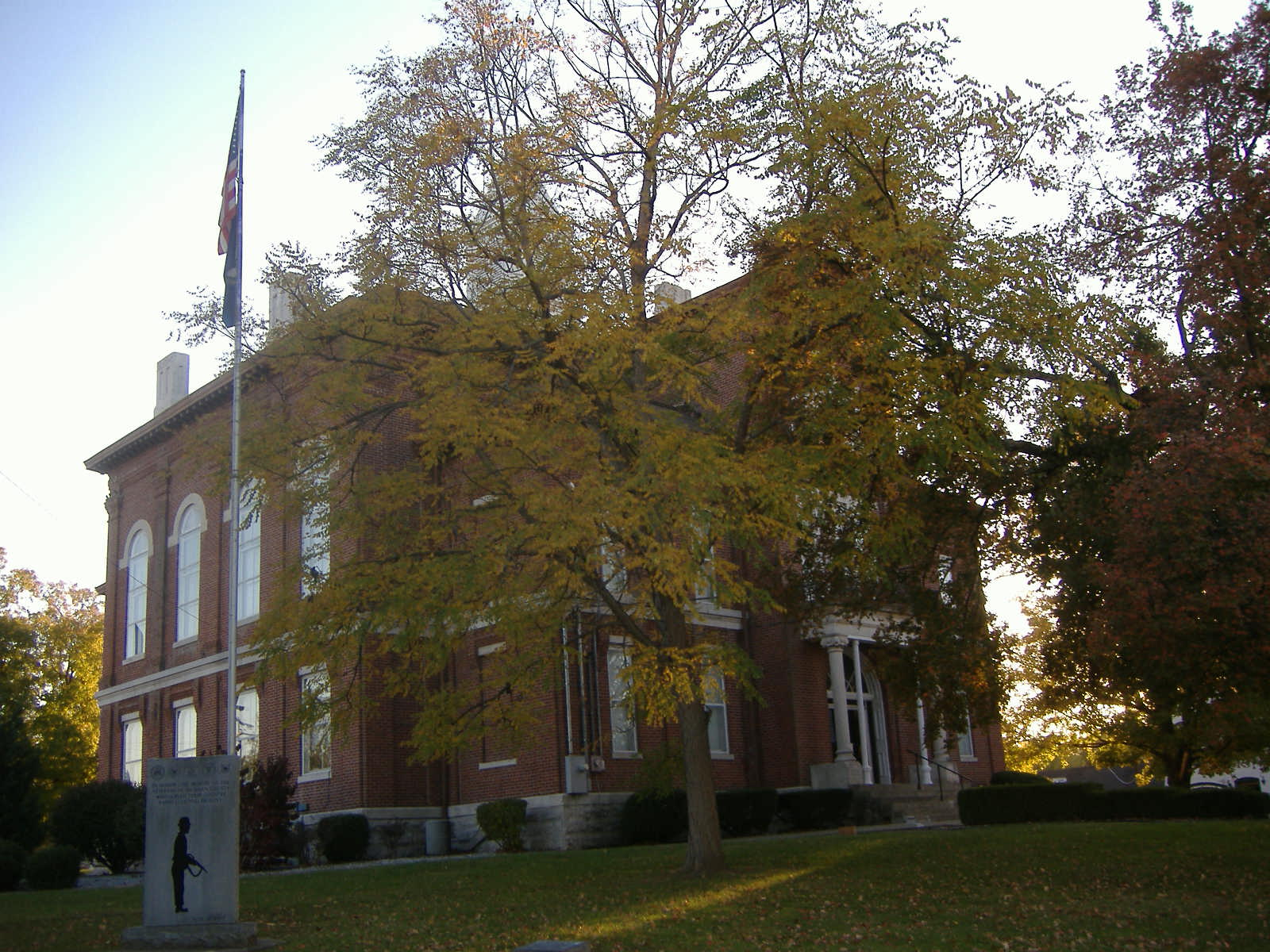
- Hickman County Courthouse in Clinton

- Location within the U.S. state of Kentucky
- Coordinates: 36°41′N 88°59′W
- Country: United States
- State: Kentucky
- Founded: 1821
- Named for: Paschal Hickman
- Seat: Clinton
- Largest city: Clinton

Government
  - Judge/Executive: Kenny Wilson (R)

Area
  - Total: 253 sq mi (660 km^{2})
  - Land: 242 sq mi (630 km^{2})
  - Water: 11 sq mi (28 km^{2}) 4.3%

Population (2020)
  - Total: 4,521
  - Estimate (2025): 4,372 ▼
  - Density: 18.7/sq mi (7.21/km^{2})
- Time zone: UTC−6 (Central)
  - Summer (DST): UTC−5 (CDT)
- Congressional district: 1st
- Website: www.explorehickmancounty.com

Hickman County is a county located in the U.S. state of Kentucky. As of the 2020 census, the population was 4,521, making it the third-least populous county in Kentucky. Its county seat is Clinton. The county was formed in 1821. It is the least densely populated county in the state and is a prohibition or dry county.

== History ==
Founded in 1821, Hickman County was the seventy-first in order of formation. It was named for Captain Paschal Hickman of the 1st Rifle Regiment, Kentucky Militia. A resident of Franklin County, Kentucky, Hickman was wounded and captured at the Battle of Frenchtown in January 1813 and was killed by Indians in the Massacre of the River Raisin.

Columbus, Kentucky, in the northwest of the county and located on the Mississippi River, was the original county seat. A log structure built in 1823 served as the courthouse. In 1830, the county seat was moved to the more centrally located Clinton. Since 1845 when Fulton County, Kentucky was partitioned, Hickman County has maintained its current borders.

In 1861, early in the American Civil War, the Confederate Army established Fort de Russey on the strategically located bluffs at Columbus across the river from Belmont, Missouri. Confederate General Leonidas Polk knew it was important to control the river, and wanted to extend a massive chain across the Mississippi to block Union forces from going downstream. (This was never achieved.) The fort was garrisoned with several thousand troops and a six-gun battery was installed; a smaller force was based at a Confederate camp in Belmont.

Union Gen. Ulysses S. Grant moved troops from his base at Cairo, Illinois, and attacked Belmont in November 1861, his first battle of the war. He was ultimately defeated by Confederate troops sent from Columbus across the river to reinforce the Confederate defense; they were led by Polk. The former site of the Confederate fortifications near Columbus, Kentucky is now the Columbus-Belmont State Park, commemorating all the actions of the day that led to Union defeat here.

== Geography ==
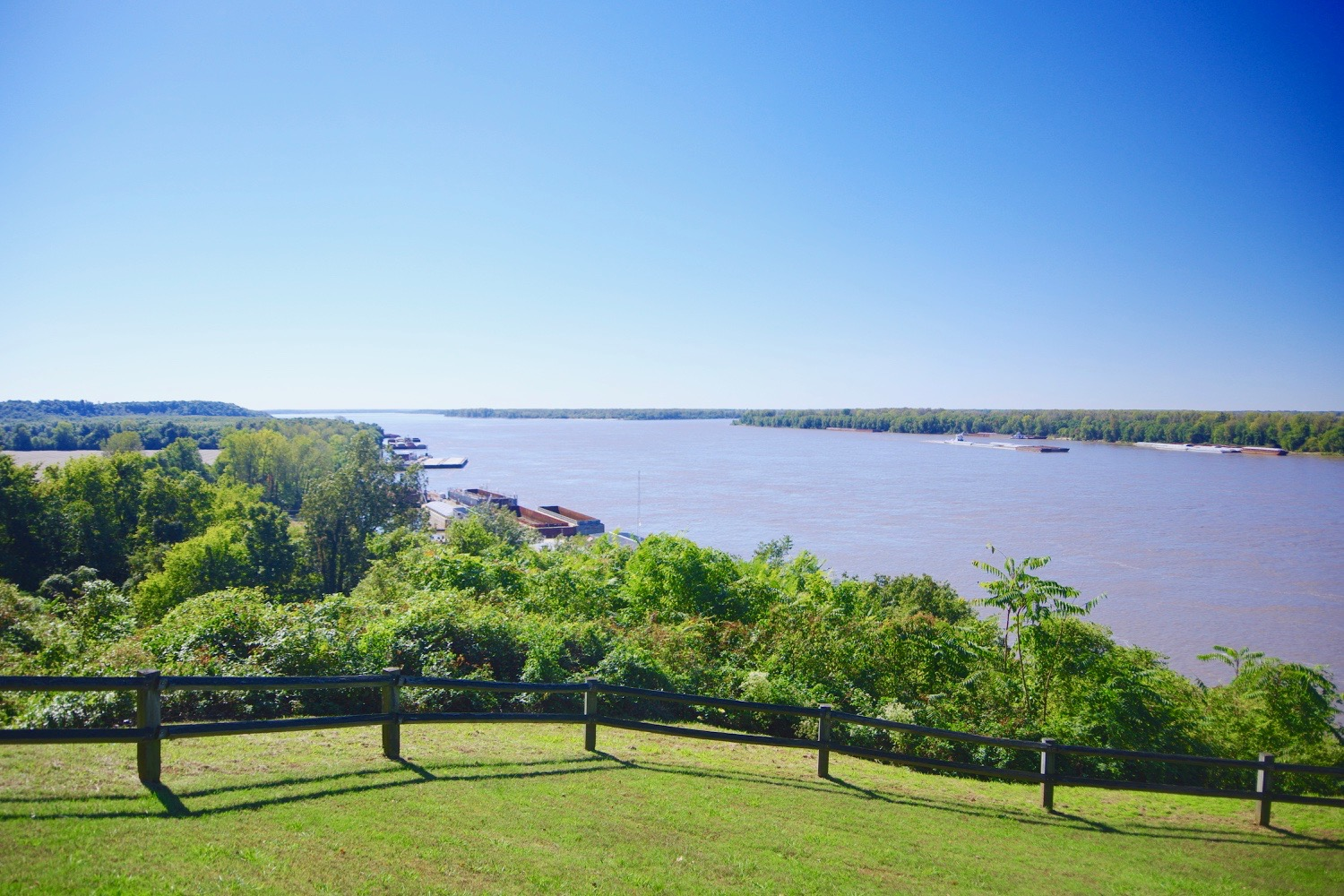
The Mississippi River, viewed from Columbus-Belmont State Park

According to the U.S. Census Bureau, the county has a total area of 253 square miles (660 km^{2}), of which 242 square miles (630 km^{2}) is land and 11 square miles (28 km^{2}) (4.3%) is water. The elevation in the county ranges from 276 to 510 feet (84 to 155 m) above sea level. The county's western border is formed by the Mississippi River, nearly a mile wide here, with the state of Missouri on the other side. Some portions of the county are landlocked to Missouri west of the Mississippi.

=== Adjacent counties ===
- Carlisle County (north)
- Graves County (east)
- Weakley County, Tennessee (southeast)
- Obion County, Tennessee (south)
- Fulton County (south)
- Mississippi County, Missouri (west)

== Demographics ==
Historical population
Census	Pop.	Note	%±
1830	5,198		—
1840	8,968		72.5%
1850	4,791		−46.6%
1860	7,008		46.3%
1870	8,453		20.6%
1880	10,651		26.0%
1890	11,637		9.3%
1900	11,745		0.9%
1910	11,750		0.0%
1920	10,244		−12.8%
1930	8,725		−14.8%
1940	9,142		4.8%
1950	7,778		−14.9%
1960	6,747		−13.3%
1970	6,264		−7.2%
1980	6,065		−3.2%
1990	5,566		−8.2%
2000	5,262		−5.5%
2010	4,902		−6.8%
2020	4,521		−7.8%
2025 (est.)	4,372	▼	−3.3%
U.S. Decennial Census; 1790-1960 1900-1990; 1990-2000 2010-2021

=== 2020 census ===
As of the 2020 census, the county had a population of 4,521. The median age was 48.0 years. 21.9% of residents were under the age of 18 and 25.2% of residents were 65 years of age or older. For every 100 females there were 91.7 males, and for every 100 females age 18 and over there were 90.0 males age 18 and over.

The racial makeup of the county was 86.3% White, 8.5% Black or African American, 0.3% American Indian and Alaska Native, 0.2% Asian, 0.0% Native Hawaiian and Pacific Islander, 0.4% from some other race, and 4.2% from two or more races. Hispanic or Latino residents of any race comprised 2.3% of the population.

0.0% of residents lived in urban areas, while 100.0% lived in rural areas.

There were 1,916 households in the county, of which 27.6% had children under the age of 18 living with them and 28.8% had a female householder with no spouse or partner present. About 31.6% of all households were made up of individuals and 16.6% had someone living alone who was 65 years of age or older.

There were 2,150 housing units, of which 10.9% were vacant. Among occupied housing units, 76.6% were owner-occupied and 23.4% were renter-occupied. The homeowner vacancy rate was 1.5% and the rental vacancy rate was 4.4%.

=== 2000 census ===
As of the census of 2000, there were 5,262 people, 2,188 households, and 1,542 families residing in the county. The population density was 22 per square mile (8.5/km^{2}). There were 2,436 housing units at an average density of 10 per square mile (3.9/km^{2}). The racial makeup of the county was 88.35% White, 9.90% Black or African American, 0.29% Native American, 0.06% Asian, 0.17% from other races, and 1.24% from two or more races. 1.03% of the population were Hispanic or Latino of any race.

There were 2,188 households, out of which 28.20% had children under the age of 18 living with them, 56.50% were married couples living together, 10.80% had a female householder with no husband present, and 29.50% were non-families. 27.60% of all households were made up of individuals, and 13.00% had someone living alone who was 65 years of age or older. The average household size was 2.34 and the average family size was 2.82.

In the county, the population was spread out, with 22.10% under the age of 18, 6.90% from 18 to 24, 26.70% from 25 to 44, 25.90% from 45 to 64, and 18.50% who were 65 years of age or older. The median age was 41 years. For every 100 females there were 91.30 males. For every 100 females age 18 and over, there were 88.90 males.

The median income for a household in the county was $31,615, and the median income for a family was $37,049. Males had a median income of $28,438 versus $18,506 for females. The per capita income for the county was $17,279. About 14.20% of families and 17.40% of the population were below the poverty line, including 27.70% of those under age 18 and 13.80% of those age 65 or over.

== Communities ==
=== Cities ===
- Clinton (county seat)
- Columbus

=== Unincorporated communities ===
- Bugg
- Hailwell
- Moscow
- New Cypress
- Oakton

== Notable people ==
- Robert Burns Smith, third Governor of Montana

== Politics ==
United States presidential election results for Hickman County, Kentucky
Year	Republican		Democratic		Third party(ies)	
Year	No.	%	No.	%	No.	%
1836	198	27.54%	521	72.46%	0	0.00%
1840	393	36.49%	684	63.51%	0	0.00%
1844	304	29.12%	740	70.88%	0	0.00%
1848	169	32.38%	353	67.62%	0	0.00%
1852	155	29.03%	379	70.97%	0	0.00%
1856	0	0.00%	631	72.11%	244	27.89%
1860	1	0.10%	66	6.81%	902	93.09%
1864	289	56.45%	223	43.55%	0	0.00%
1868	41	3.99%	987	96.01%	0	0.00%
1872	401	34.04%	777	65.96%	0	0.00%
1876	381	22.44%	1,317	77.56%	0	0.00%
1880	386	26.01%	1,069	72.04%	29	1.95%
1884	489	28.36%	1,204	69.84%	31	1.80%
1888	383	25.31%	1,053	69.60%	77	5.09%
1892	460	24.31%	1,155	61.05%	277	14.64%
1896	727	26.53%	1,928	70.36%	85	3.10%
1900	862	30.98%	1,876	67.43%	44	1.58%
1904	702	28.68%	1,680	68.63%	66	2.70%
1908	658	25.44%	1,890	73.09%	38	1.47%
1912	365	17.66%	1,540	74.50%	162	7.84%
1916	539	21.05%	1,982	77.42%	39	1.52%
1920	866	22.01%	3,045	77.40%	23	0.58%
1924	618	21.27%	2,270	78.14%	17	0.59%
1928	767	26.12%	2,163	73.67%	6	0.20%
1932	446	11.77%	3,327	87.81%	16	0.42%
1936	385	13.04%	2,548	86.31%	19	0.64%
1940	490	15.05%	2,758	84.73%	7	0.22%
1944	588	22.60%	2,005	77.06%	9	0.35%
1948	326	12.26%	2,143	80.59%	190	7.15%
1952	871	30.40%	1,988	69.39%	6	0.21%
1956	785	24.82%	2,367	74.83%	11	0.35%
1960	968	30.79%	2,176	69.21%	0	0.00%
1964	613	22.10%	2,149	77.47%	12	0.43%
1968	623	23.19%	880	32.76%	1,183	44.04%
1972	1,430	56.66%	976	38.67%	118	4.68%
1976	585	21.54%	2,035	74.93%	96	3.53%
1980	1,143	42.84%	1,456	54.57%	69	2.59%
1984	1,380	56.63%	1,049	43.04%	8	0.33%
1988	1,142	49.33%	1,158	50.02%	15	0.65%
1992	861	35.04%	1,296	52.75%	300	12.21%
1996	695	31.98%	1,220	56.14%	258	11.87%
2000	1,151	54.19%	940	44.26%	33	1.55%
2004	1,395	59.56%	926	39.54%	21	0.90%
2008	1,406	62.49%	812	36.09%	32	1.42%
2012	1,431	66.90%	686	32.07%	22	1.03%
2016	1,657	76.82%	449	20.82%	51	2.36%
2020	1,714	77.94%	458	20.83%	27	1.23%
2024	1,656	80.04%	394	19.04%	19	0.92%

Hickman's voting pattern is typical for a county politically aligned with the Solid South, being quite loyal to the Democrats even during some of their biggest nationwide defeats until 1968. For the remainder of the century, it still largely leaned Democratic, but starting in 2000, has become increasingly Republican in every new election.

=== Elected officials ===
Elected officials as of January 3, 2025
U.S. House	James Comer (R)	KY 1
Ky. Senate	Jason Howell (R)	1
Ky. House	Steven Rudy (R)	1

== See also ==
- Murphy's Pond
- National Register of Historic Places listings in Hickman County, Kentucky
