= Fayette County, Kentucky =

County in Kentucky, United States

Lexington-Fayette Urban County
- Consolidated city-county
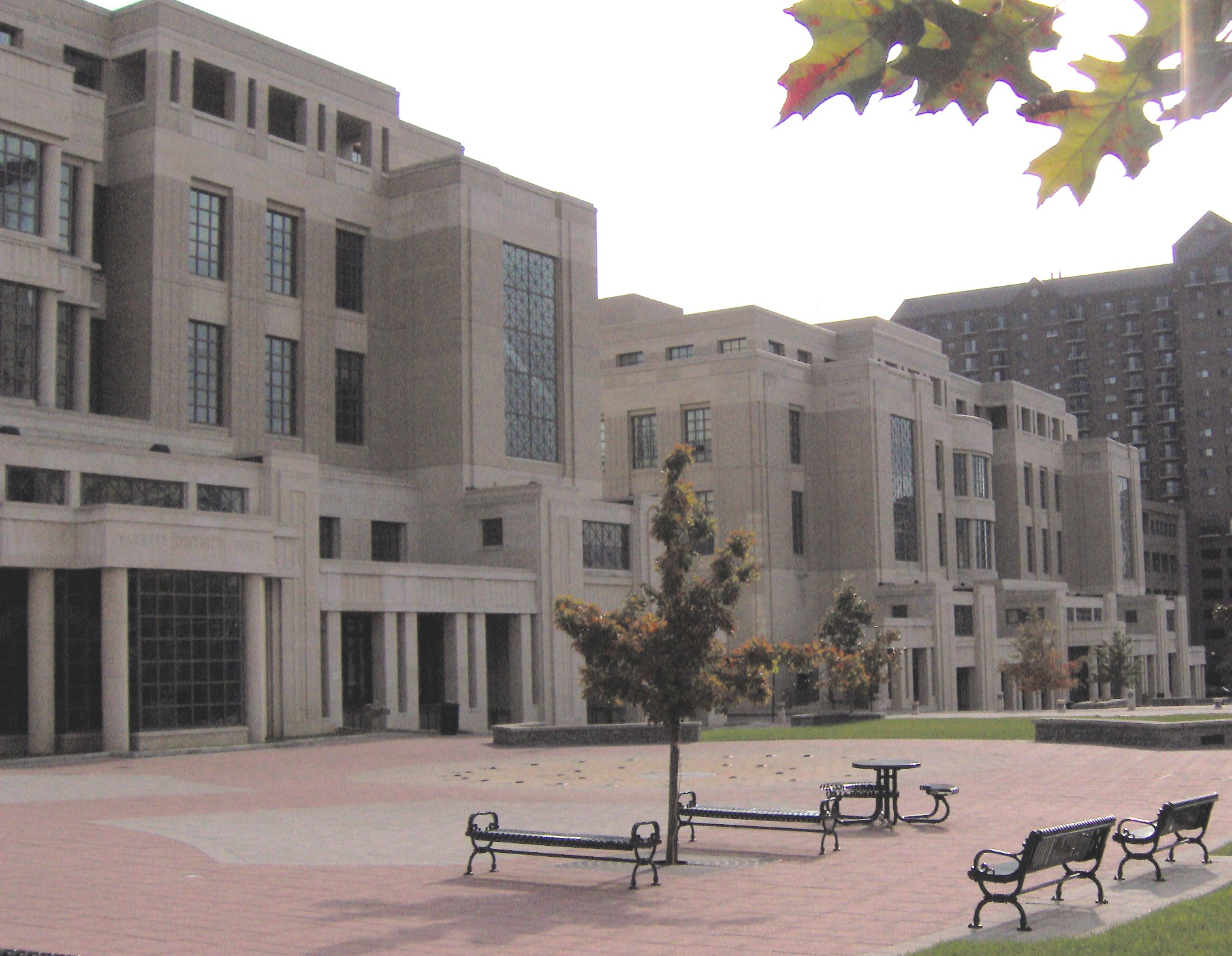
- Robert F. Stephens Courthouse Complex in Lexington

- Seal

- Location within the U.S. state of Kentucky
- Coordinates: 38°02′N 84°28′W
- Country: United States
- State: Kentucky
- Founded: 1780
- Named for: Gilbert du Motier, Marquis de Lafayette
- Seat: Lexington
- Largest city: Lexington

Government
  - Judge/Executive: Mary Diane Hanna (D)

Area
  - Total: 286 sq mi (740 km^{2})
  - Land: 284 sq mi (740 km^{2})
  - Water: 1.9 sq mi (4.9 km^{2}) 0.7%

Population (2020)
  - Total: 322,570
  - Estimate (2025): 329,751 ▲
  - Density: 1,140/sq mi (439/km^{2})
- Time zone: UTC−5 (Eastern)
  - Summer (DST): UTC−4 (EDT)
- Congressional district: 6th
- Website: www.lexingtonky.gov

Fayette County is a county located in the central part of the U.S. state of Kentucky and is consolidated with the city of Lexington. As of the 2020 census, the population was 322,570, making it the second-most populous county in the commonwealth. Since 1974, its territory, population and government have been shared with Lexington. Fayette County is part of the Lexington-Fayette, KY Metropolitan Statistical Area.

== History ==
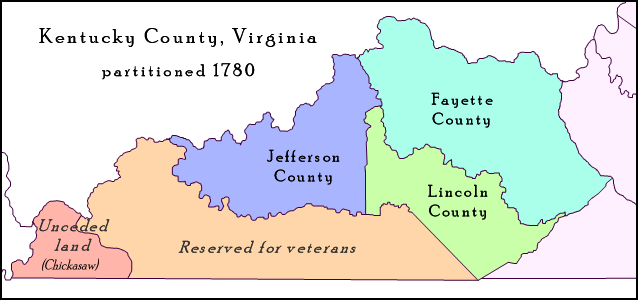
Fayette County was formed in 1780, when the Virginia General Assembly partitioned Kentucky County.

Fayette County—originally Fayette County, Virginia—was established by the Virginia General Assembly in June 1780, when it abolished and subdivided Kentucky County into three counties: Fayette, Jefferson and Lincoln. Together, these counties and those set off from them later in that decade separated from Virginia in 1792 to become the Commonwealth of Kentucky.

Originally, Fayette County included land which makes up 37 present-day counties and parts of 7 others. It was reduced to its present boundaries in 1799. The county is named for the Marquis de LaFayette, who moved to the United States to support the colonies rebelling against British rule during the American Revolutionary War.

On January 1, 1974, Fayette County merged its government with that of its county seat of Lexington, creating a consolidated city-county governed by the Lexington-Fayette Urban County Government.

== Geography ==
According to the United States Census Bureau, the county has a total area of 286 square miles (740 km^{2}), of which 284 square miles (740 km^{2}) is land and 1.9 square miles (4.9 km^{2}) (0.7%) is water.

=== Major highways ===
- Interstate 75
- Interstate 64
- U.S. Route 25
- U.S. Route 27
- U.S. Route 60
- U.S. Route 68
- U.S. Route 421
- Kentucky Route 4, a.k.a. New Circle Road

=== Adjacent counties ===
- Scott County (north)
- Bourbon County (northeast)
- Clark County (east)
- Madison County (south)
- Jessamine County (south)
- Woodford County (west)

== Demographics ==
Historical population
Census	Pop.	Note	%±
1790	18,410		—
1800	14,028		−23.8%
1810	21,370		52.3%
1820	23,250		8.8%
1830	25,098		7.9%
1840	22,194		−11.6%
1850	22,735		2.4%
1860	22,599		−0.6%
1870	26,656		18.0%
1880	29,023		8.9%
1890	35,698		23.0%
1900	42,071		17.9%
1910	47,715		13.4%
1920	54,664		14.6%
1930	68,543		25.4%
1940	78,899		15.1%
1950	100,746		27.7%
1960	131,906		30.9%
1970	174,323		32.2%
1980	204,165		17.1%
1990	225,366		10.4%
2000	260,512		15.6%
2010	295,803		13.5%
2020	322,570		9.0%
2025 (est.)	329,751	▲	2.2%
U.S. Decennial Census; 1790-1960 1900-1990; 1990-2000 2010-2020

=== 2020 census ===
As of the 2020 census, the county had a population of 322,570. The median age was 35.2 years. 21.1% of residents were under the age of 18 and 14.3% of residents were 65 years of age or older. For every 100 females there were 93.5 males, and for every 100 females age 18 and over there were 91.1 males age 18 and over.

The racial makeup of the county was 68.3% White, 14.9% Black or African American, 0.3% American Indian and Alaska Native, 4.2% Asian, 0.0% Native Hawaiian and Pacific Islander, 5.2% from some other race, and 7.1% from two or more races. Hispanic or Latino residents of any race comprised 9.2% of the population.

97.1% of residents lived in urban areas, while 2.9% lived in rural areas.

There were 134,535 households in the county, of which 27.5% had children under the age of 18 living with them and 31.8% had a female householder with no spouse or partner present. About 33.7% of all households were made up of individuals and 10.3% had someone living alone who was 65 years of age or older.

There were 146,142 housing units, of which 7.9% were vacant. Among occupied housing units, 52.6% were owner-occupied and 47.4% were renter-occupied. The homeowner vacancy rate was 1.5% and the rental vacancy rate was 8.7%.

=== 2010 census ===
As of the census of 2010, there were 295,803 people, 123,043 households, and 69,661 families residing in the county. The population density was 1,034 inhabitants per square mile (399/km^{2}). There were 135,160 housing units at an average density of 473 per square mile (183/km^{2}). The racial makeup of the county was 75.7% White, 14.5% Black or African American, 0.3% Native American, 3.2% Asian, 0.1% Pacific Islander, 3.7% from other races, and 2.5% from two or more races. 6.9% of the population were Hispanic or Latino of any race.

There were 123,043 households, out of which 25.7% had children under the age of 18 living with them, 40.1% were married couples living together, 12.3% had a female householder with no husband present, and 43.4% were non-families. 32.7% of all households were made up of individuals, and 8.0% had someone living alone who was 65 years of age or older. The average household size was 2.3 and the average family size was 2.94.

In the county, the population was spread out, with 21.2% under the age of 18, 5.9% from 18 to 21, and 62.4% from 21 to 65. 10.5% were 65 years of age or older. The median age was 33.7 years. 50.8% of the population was female.

The median income for a household in the county was $47,469, and the median income for a family was $66,690. Males had a median income of $44,343 versus $35,716 for females. The per capita income for the county was $28,345. About 11.1% of families and 17.4% of the population were below the poverty line, including 21.6% of those under age 18 and 8.6% of those age 65 or over.

== Education ==
=== Public high schools ===
Schools in the county are operated by Fayette County Public Schools.

- Henry Clay High School
- Paul Laurence Dunbar High School
- Frederick Douglass High School
- Bryan Station High School
- Lafayette High School
- Tates Creek High School
- STEAM Academy

=== Private middle and elementary schools ===
- The Lexington School
- Sayre School
- Lexington Christian Academy
- Christ the King School
- Mary Queen of the Holy Rosary School
- Saints Peter and Paul School
- Seton Catholic School
- Trinity Christian Academy
- Redwood Cooperative School

=== Private high schools ===
- Lexington Catholic High School
- Lexington Christian Academy
- Sayre School

=== Colleges and universities ===
- Bluegrass Community and Technical College
- Indiana Wesleyan University (Lexington campus)
- ITT Technical Institute
- Lexington Theological Seminary
- Midway College (Lexington campus)
- National College of Business & Technology
- Spencerian College
- Sullivan University
- Transylvania University
- University of Kentucky

== Politics ==
United States presidential election results for Fayette County, Kentucky
Year	Republican		Democratic		Third party(ies)	
Year	No.	%	No.	%	No.	%
1880	2,830	53.20%	2,449	46.03%	41	0.77%
1884	3,000	53.19%	2,593	45.98%	47	0.83%
1888	3,301	48.13%	3,435	50.08%	123	1.79%
1892	2,431	37.19%	3,753	57.42%	352	5.39%
1896	5,143	55.54%	3,938	42.53%	179	1.93%
1900	5,302	54.78%	4,293	44.36%	83	0.86%
1904	3,947	42.87%	5,119	55.60%	141	1.53%
1908	4,748	46.76%	5,247	51.68%	158	1.56%
1912	4,060	37.80%	5,268	49.04%	1,414	13.16%
1916	5,472	45.95%	6,348	53.30%	89	0.75%
1920	11,032	45.70%	12,926	53.55%	181	0.75%
1924	11,755	52.20%	10,433	46.33%	331	1.47%
1928	16,988	65.11%	9,065	34.74%	39	0.15%
1932	11,847	42.51%	15,765	56.57%	257	0.92%
1936	11,544	44.10%	14,428	55.12%	203	0.78%
1940	12,514	44.01%	15,834	55.69%	84	0.30%
1944	10,857	44.14%	13,567	55.15%	174	0.71%
1948	10,959	41.91%	13,202	50.49%	1,988	7.60%
1952	17,376	54.66%	14,275	44.91%	138	0.43%
1956	21,904	61.38%	13,547	37.96%	232	0.65%
1960	25,169	60.43%	16,478	39.57%	0	0.00%
1964	18,739	42.40%	25,317	57.29%	136	0.31%
1968	24,948	49.53%	16,902	33.55%	8,523	16.92%
1972	42,362	66.54%	19,828	31.14%	1,476	2.32%
1976	35,170	54.12%	28,012	43.10%	1,807	2.78%
1980	35,349	49.22%	30,511	42.48%	5,957	8.29%
1984	51,993	63.60%	28,961	35.43%	792	0.97%
1988	48,065	58.96%	32,554	39.93%	906	1.11%
1992	41,908	43.87%	38,306	40.10%	15,320	16.04%
1996	42,930	46.33%	43,632	47.09%	6,102	6.59%
2000	54,495	51.67%	47,277	44.82%	3,705	3.51%
2004	66,406	52.88%	57,994	46.18%	1,176	0.94%
2008	59,884	46.91%	66,042	51.74%	1,722	1.35%
2012	60,795	48.30%	62,080	49.32%	2,991	2.38%
2016	56,894	41.74%	69,778	51.19%	9,643	7.07%
2020	58,860	38.49%	90,600	59.25%	3,452	2.26%
2024	57,347	39.84%	83,387	57.93%	3,201	2.22%

For much of the 20th century, Fayette County leaned more Republican than Kentucky as a whole. Between 1952 and 2004, it voted for the Republican nominee all but twice, for Lyndon B. Johnson in 1964 and Bill Clinton in 1996, with the latter only carrying the county by a narrow plurality. Even Southern Democrat Jimmy Carter lost the county by 11 points in 1976, despite winning Kentucky by a comfortable margin.

Until the mid-2000s, it did not swing as heavily to the Democrats as other urban counties. From 1992 to 2016, it was a swing county with close results between the two parties. In 2008, Barack Obama became the first Democrat to win the county since Bill Clinton in 1996, and the first Democrat to win a majority of its votes since Johnson. In 2016, Hillary Clinton won the county by the largest margin since Johnson, although it was one of only two counties in the entire Commonwealth to vote for her, the other being Jefferson County, home to the city of Louisville.

In 2020, Joe Biden turned in the strongest showing for a Democrat in the county in over a century, bettering even Franklin D. Roosevelt. In that year, Fayette County was the most Democratic county in the Commonwealth, giving Biden a slightly larger margin than Jefferson County, marking the first time since 1948 that Fayette County voted to the left of Jefferson County in a presidential election. This marked the first time that Fayette County was the most Democratic county in the state in Kentucky history. With nearly 60% of the vote, Biden received the highest percentage of the vote in the county of any Democratic candidate in history. Also in 2020, Donald Trump received the lowest portion of the vote for any Republican candidate in the county since William Howard Taft in 1912.

The county voted "No" on 2022 Kentucky Amendment 2, an anti-abortion ballot measure, by 73% to 27%, outpacing its support of Joe Biden during the 2020 presidential election.

=== Elected officials ===
Elected officials as of January 3, 2025
U.S. House	Andy Barr (R)	KY 6
Ky. Senate	Amanda Mays Bledsoe (R)	12
Ky. Senate	Reginald Thomas (D)	13
Ky. Senate	Matt Nunn (R)	17
Ky. Senate	Donald Douglas (R)	22
Ky. Senate	Stephen West (R)	27
Ky. Senate	Greg Elkins (R)	28
Ky. Senate	Jared Carpenter (R)	34
Ky. House	Matt Lockett (R)	39
Ky. House	Adam Moore (D)	45
Ky. House	Ryan Dotson (R)	73
Ky. House	Lindsey Burke (D)	75
Ky. House	Anne Gay Donworth (D)	76
Ky. House	George Brown Jr. (D)	77
Ky. House	Chad Aull (D)	79
Ky. House	Vanessa Grossl (R)	88
Ky. House	Adrielle Camuel (D)	93

== Communities ==
=== City ===
- Lexington

=== Unincorporated communities ===
- Andover
- Athens
- Clays Ferry
- Colby (partly in Clark County)
- Little Texas
- South Elkhorn
- Spears (partly in Jessamine County)
- Todds Station

=== Historically black hamlets ===
- Bracktown
- Cadentown
- Jimtown
- Smithtown
- Little Georgetown
- Pralltown
- Uttingertown

== See also ==
- National Register of Historic Places listings in Fayette County, Kentucky
