= Bugg, Kentucky =

Unincorporated community in Kentucky, United States

- Unincorporated community
- Location within Kentucky Location within the United States
- Coordinates: 36°41′8″N 88°54′36″W
- Country: United States
- State: Kentucky
- County: Hickman
- Elevation: 440 ft (130 m)
- Time zone: UTC-6 (Central (CST))
  - Summer (DST): UTC-5 (CST)
- GNIS feature ID: 2743893

Bugg is an unincorporated community located in Hickman County, Kentucky, United States.
