= 1904 United States presidential election in Kentucky =

- November 8, 1904
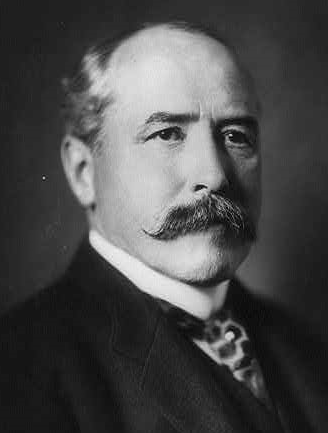

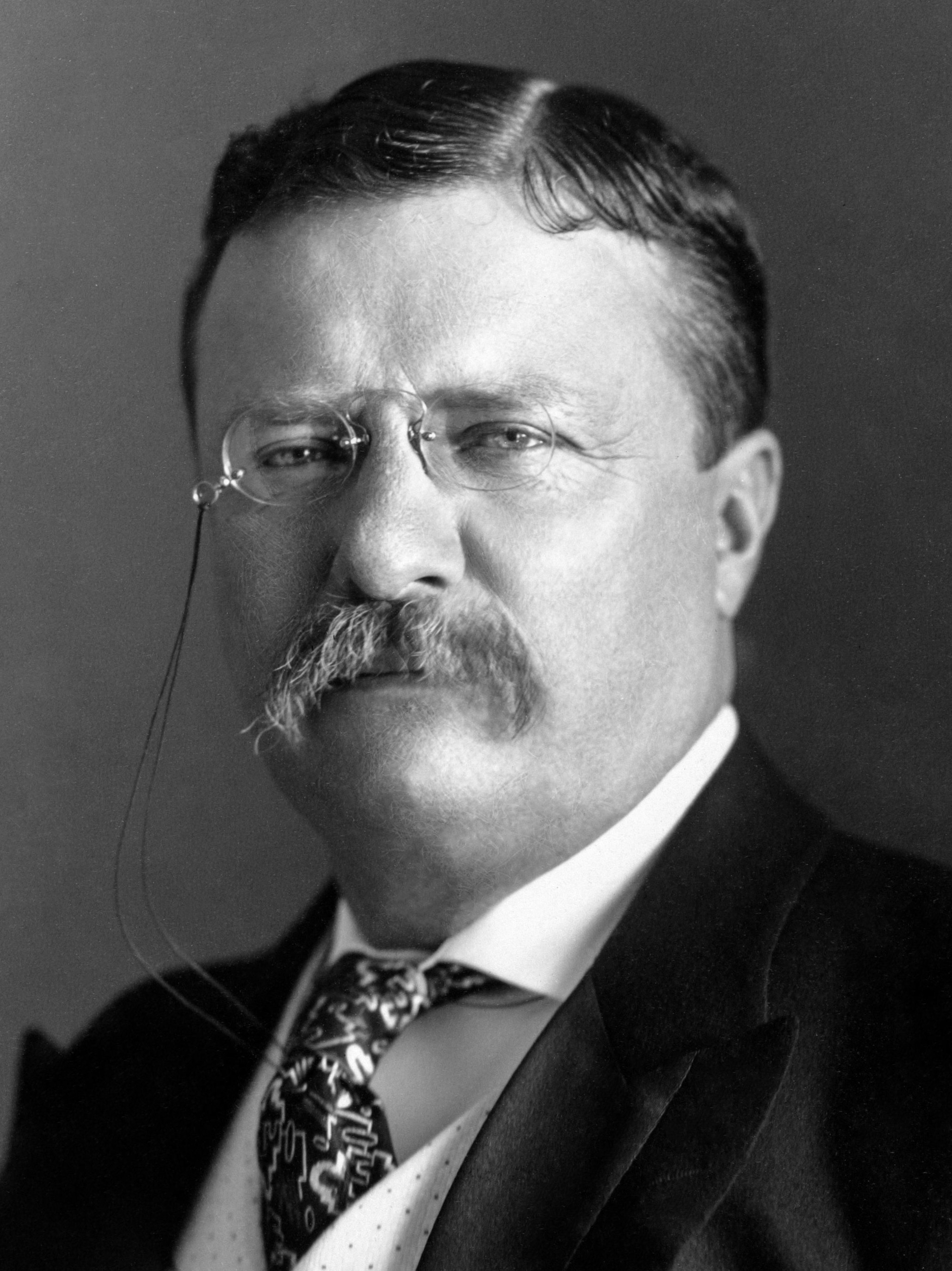
Nominee	Alton B. Parker	Theodore Roosevelt
Party	Democratic	Republican
Home state	New York	New York
Running mate	Henry G. Davis	Charles W. Fairbanks
Electoral vote	13	0
Popular vote	217,170	205,457
Percentage	49.82%	47.13%
County results
Parker
40–50%
50–60%
60–70%
70–80%
Roosevelt
40–50%
50–60%
60–70%
70–80%
80–90%
90–100%
President before election
Theodore Roosevelt
Republican
Elected President
Theodore Roosevelt
Republican

The 1904 United States presidential election in Kentucky took place on November 8, 1904. All contemporary 45 states were part of the 1904 United States presidential election. Voters chose 13 electors to the Electoral College, which selected the president and vice president.

Ever since the Civil War, Kentucky had been shaped politically by divisions created by that war between secessionist, Democratic counties and Unionist, Republican ones, although the state as a whole leaned Democratic throughout this era and the GOP had carried the state only once – by a very narrow margin in 1896 when northern parts of the state were affected by hostility towards William Jennings Bryan, and state native John M. Palmer drew votes from the Democrats.

Kentucky was won by the Democratic nominees, Chief Judge Alton B. Parker of New York and his running mate Henry G. Davis of West Virginia. They defeated the Republican nominees, incumbent President Theodore Roosevelt of New York and his running mate Charles W. Fairbanks of Indiana. Parker won the state by a narrow margin of 2.69%.

Despite Parker losing nationally in a landslide, he marginally improved on Bryan's win from 1900, although doing less well than predicted a week beforehand, when polls suggested Parker would win by 22 thousand votes or twice his actual plurality.

== Results ==
1904 United States presidential election in Kentucky
Party	Candidate	Votes	Percentage	Electoral votes
Democratic	Alton B. Parker	217,170	49.82%	13
Republican	Theodore Roosevelt (incumbent)	205,457	47.13%	0
Prohibition	Silas C. Swallow	6,603	1.51%	0
Social Democratic	Eugene V. Debs	3,599	0.83%	0
Populist	Thomas E. Watson	2,521	0.58%	0
Socialist Labor	Charles Hunter Corregan	596	0.14%	0
Totals		435,946	100.00%	13
Voter turnout				—

=== Results by county ===
County	Alton B. Parker Democratic		Theodore Roosevelt Republican		Silas C. Swallow Prohibition		Eugene V. Debs Socialist		Thomas E. Watson Populist		Charles Corregan Socialist Labor		Margin		Total votes cast
County	#	%	#	%	#	%	#	%	#	%	#	%	#	%	Total votes cast
Adair	1,327	43.59%	1,652	54.27%	60	1.97%	2	0.07%	1	0.03%	2	0.07%	-325	-10.68%	3,044
Allen	1,379	42.88%	1,768	54.98%	49	1.52%	4	0.12%	9	0.28%	7	0.22%	-389	-12.10%	3,216
Anderson	1,429	58.73%	959	39.42%	32	1.32%	1	0.04%	10	0.41%	2	0.08%	470	19.32%	2,433
Ballard	1,598	70.99%	556	24.70%	28	1.24%	49	2.18%	18	0.80%	2	0.09%	1,042	46.29%	2,251
Barren	3,051	58.46%	2,073	39.72%	44	0.84%	3	0.06%	46	0.88%	2	0.04%	978	18.74%	5,219
Bath	1,503	51.90%	1,342	46.34%	35	1.21%	2	0.07%	14	0.48%	0	0.00%	161	5.56%	2,896
Bell	538	22.61%	1,764	74.12%	25	1.05%	44	1.85%	9	0.38%	0	0.00%	-1,226	-51.51%	2,380
Boone	2,013	76.57%	578	21.99%	28	1.07%	4	0.15%	6	0.23%	0	0.00%	1,435	54.58%	2,629
Bourbon	2,586	53.66%	2,147	44.55%	80	1.66%	4	0.08%	2	0.04%	0	0.00%	439	9.11%	4,819
Boyd	1,716	39.31%	2,544	58.28%	67	1.53%	29	0.66%	5	0.11%	4	0.09%	-828	-18.97%	4,365
Boyle	1,646	53.58%	1,366	44.47%	40	1.30%	7	0.23%	13	0.42%	0	0.00%	280	9.11%	3,072
Bracken	1,596	55.90%	1,165	40.81%	47	1.65%	39	1.37%	3	0.11%	5	0.18%	431	15.10%	2,855
Breathitt	1,537	64.26%	829	34.66%	16	0.67%	9	0.38%	0	0.00%	1	0.04%	708	29.60%	2,392
Breckinridge	2,066	45.47%	2,353	51.78%	66	1.45%	0	0.00%	59	1.30%	0	0.00%	-287	-6.32%	4,544
Bullitt	1,284	66.94%	593	30.92%	26	1.36%	9	0.47%	4	0.21%	2	0.10%	691	36.03%	1,918
Butler	951	28.58%	2,298	69.05%	55	1.65%	0	0.00%	24	0.72%	0	0.00%	-1,347	-40.47%	3,328
Caldwell	1,227	44.20%	1,413	50.90%	28	1.01%	48	1.73%	59	2.13%	1	0.04%	-186	-6.70%	2,776
Calloway	2,466	69.62%	824	23.26%	106	2.99%	5	0.14%	133	3.75%	8	0.23%	1,642	46.36%	3,542
Campbell	4,562	39.49%	5,759	49.85%	105	0.91%	1,061	9.18%	14	0.12%	52	0.45%	-1,197	-10.36%	11,553
Carlisle	1,428	70.31%	468	23.04%	63	3.10%	10	0.49%	60	2.95%	2	0.10%	960	47.27%	2,031
Carroll	1,548	72.00%	546	25.40%	50	2.33%	0	0.00%	5	0.23%	1	0.05%	1,002	46.60%	2,150
Carter	1,442	36.63%	2,419	61.44%	58	1.47%	9	0.23%	6	0.15%	3	0.08%	-977	-24.82%	3,937
Casey	1,133	40.55%	1,595	57.09%	64	2.29%	1	0.04%	1	0.04%	0	0.00%	-462	-16.54%	2,794
Christian	2,681	40.30%	3,870	58.17%	69	1.04%	6	0.09%	27	0.41%	0	0.00%	-1,189	-17.87%	6,653
Clark	2,442	58.51%	1,683	40.32%	36	0.86%	5	0.12%	7	0.17%	1	0.02%	759	18.18%	4,174
Clay	532	23.72%	1,685	75.12%	18	0.80%	2	0.09%	2	0.09%	4	0.18%	-1,153	-51.40%	2,243
Clinton	305	23.59%	948	73.32%	28	2.17%	1	0.08%	11	0.85%	0	0.00%	-643	-49.73%	1,293
Crittenden	1,207	40.29%	1,690	56.41%	80	2.67%	0	0.00%	18	0.60%	1	0.03%	-483	-16.12%	2,996
Cumberland	561	34.98%	1,001	62.41%	39	2.43%	0	0.00%	3	0.19%	0	0.00%	-440	-27.43%	1,604
Daviess	4,754	56.71%	3,381	40.33%	125	1.49%	17	0.20%	103	1.23%	3	0.04%	1,373	16.38%	8,383
Edmonson	760	38.74%	1,172	59.73%	25	1.27%	1	0.05%	4	0.20%	0	0.00%	-412	-21.00%	1,962
Elliott	1,143	65.46%	594	34.02%	9	0.52%	0	0.00%	0	0.00%	0	0.00%	549	31.44%	1,746
Estill	850	38.85%	1,280	58.50%	34	1.55%	0	0.00%	24	1.10%	0	0.00%	-430	-19.65%	2,188
Fayette	5,119	55.60%	3,947	42.87%	101	1.10%	11	0.12%	17	0.18%	12	0.13%	1,172	12.73%	9,207
Fleming	1,712	48.93%	1,707	48.79%	73	2.09%	1	0.03%	5	0.14%	1	0.03%	5	0.14%	3,499
Floyd	1,580	56.41%	1,201	42.88%	16	0.57%	0	0.00%	0	0.00%	4	0.14%	379	13.53%	2,801
Franklin	2,941	66.25%	1,449	32.64%	28	0.63%	10	0.23%	11	0.25%	0	0.00%	1,492	33.61%	4,439
Fulton	1,560	71.72%	561	25.79%	34	1.56%	10	0.46%	4	0.18%	6	0.28%	999	45.93%	2,175
Gallatin	941	72.89%	334	25.87%	13	1.01%	0	0.00%	3	0.23%	0	0.00%	607	47.02%	1,291
Garrard	1,176	45.32%	1,351	52.06%	61	2.35%	5	0.19%	2	0.08%	0	0.00%	-175	-6.74%	2,595
Grant	1,651	58.32%	1,148	40.55%	31	1.10%	1	0.04%	0	0.00%	0	0.00%	503	17.77%	2,831
Graves	4,935	73.02%	1,615	23.90%	85	1.26%	28	0.41%	88	1.30%	7	0.10%	3,320	49.13%	6,758
Grayson	1,683	41.32%	2,179	53.50%	54	1.33%	8	0.20%	144	3.54%	5	0.12%	-496	-12.18%	4,073
Green	1,071	46.32%	1,201	51.95%	31	1.34%	3	0.13%	6	0.26%	0	0.00%	-130	-5.62%	2,312
Greenup	1,112	34.40%	2,005	62.02%	53	1.64%	44	1.36%	12	0.37%	7	0.22%	-893	-27.62%	3,233
Hancock	846	43.99%	997	51.85%	60	3.12%	3	0.16%	15	0.78%	2	0.10%	-151	-7.85%	1,923
Hardin	2,714	59.82%	1,671	36.83%	82	1.81%	30	0.66%	38	0.84%	2	0.04%	1,043	22.99%	4,537
Harlan	286	16.46%	1,446	83.20%	5	0.29%	0	0.00%	1	0.06%	0	0.00%	-1,160	-66.74%	1,738
Harrison	2,688	62.53%	1,538	35.78%	65	1.51%	4	0.09%	4	0.09%	0	0.00%	1,150	26.75%	4,299
Hart	1,658	46.39%	1,794	50.20%	49	1.37%	48	1.34%	24	0.67%	1	0.03%	-136	-3.81%	3,574
Henderson	3,448	57.40%	2,300	38.29%	104	1.73%	116	1.93%	28	0.47%	11	0.18%	1,148	19.11%	6,007
Henry	2,137	58.31%	1,434	39.13%	72	1.96%	4	0.11%	17	0.46%	1	0.03%	703	19.18%	3,665
Hickman	1,680	68.63%	702	28.68%	46	1.88%	2	0.08%	15	0.61%	3	0.12%	978	39.95%	2,448
Hopkins	3,125	50.19%	2,826	45.39%	81	1.30%	58	0.93%	127	2.04%	9	0.14%	299	4.80%	6,226
Jackson	216	11.75%	1,606	87.38%	16	0.87%	0	0.00%	0	0.00%	0	0.00%	-1,390	-75.63%	1,838
Jefferson	22,781	49.57%	21,664	47.14%	669	1.46%	422	0.92%	197	0.43%	226	0.49%	1,117	2.43%	45,959
Jessamine	1,466	52.12%	1,247	44.33%	99	3.52%	0	0.00%	1	0.04%	0	0.00%	219	7.79%	2,813
Johnson	886	31.23%	1,925	67.85%	21	0.74%	0	0.00%	5	0.18%	0	0.00%	-1,039	-36.62%	2,837
Kenton	5,760	43.98%	6,306	48.14%	112	0.86%	866	6.61%	22	0.17%	32	0.24%	-546	-4.17%	13,098
Knott	1,092	68.72%	483	30.40%	11	0.69%	0	0.00%	3	0.19%	0	0.00%	609	38.33%	1,589
Knox	711	23.74%	2,240	74.79%	36	1.20%	4	0.13%	2	0.07%	2	0.07%	-1,529	-51.05%	2,995
Larue	1,301	59.11%	863	39.21%	30	1.36%	2	0.09%	4	0.18%	1	0.05%	438	19.90%	2,201
Laurel	1,050	32.13%	2,152	65.85%	38	1.16%	21	0.64%	7	0.21%	0	0.00%	-1,102	-33.72%	3,268
Lawrence	1,752	45.86%	2,014	52.72%	40	1.05%	6	0.16%	7	0.18%	1	0.03%	-262	-6.86%	3,820
Lee	527	36.98%	879	61.68%	16	1.12%	1	0.07%	1	0.07%	1	0.07%	-352	-24.70%	1,425
Leslie	71	6.86%	953	92.08%	10	0.97%	1	0.10%	0	0.00%	0	0.00%	-882	-85.22%	1,035
Letcher	405	29.61%	960	70.18%	0	0.00%	0	0.00%	0	0.00%	3	0.22%	-555	-40.57%	1,368
Lewis	1,286	33.99%	2,374	62.74%	92	2.43%	11	0.29%	18	0.48%	3	0.08%	-1,088	-28.75%	3,784
Lincoln	1,713	48.43%	1,648	46.59%	169	4.78%	2	0.06%	3	0.08%	2	0.06%	65	1.84%	3,537
Livingston	1,259	57.33%	838	38.16%	49	2.23%	13	0.59%	36	1.64%	1	0.05%	421	19.17%	2,196
Logan	2,696	52.83%	2,250	44.09%	76	1.49%	11	0.22%	69	1.35%	1	0.02%	446	8.74%	5,103
Lyon	938	53.39%	678	38.59%	56	3.19%	0	0.00%	84	4.78%	1	0.06%	260	14.80%	1,757
Madison	2,891	49.93%	2,774	47.91%	106	1.83%	7	0.12%	7	0.12%	5	0.09%	117	2.02%	5,790
Magoffin	1,000	41.34%	1,404	58.04%	12	0.50%	2	0.08%	0	0.00%	1	0.04%	-404	-16.70%	2,419
Marion	1,857	60.10%	1,191	38.54%	26	0.84%	3	0.10%	12	0.39%	1	0.03%	666	21.55%	3,090
Marshall	1,587	57.54%	920	33.36%	105	3.81%	1	0.04%	145	5.26%	0	0.00%	667	24.18%	2,758
Martin	188	16.98%	900	81.30%	14	1.26%	0	0.00%	1	0.09%	4	0.36%	-712	-64.32%	1,107
Mason	2,792	55.90%	2,029	40.62%	82	1.64%	20	0.40%	7	0.14%	65	1.30%	763	15.28%	4,995
McCracken	2,832	52.43%	2,413	44.67%	76	1.41%	39	0.72%	41	0.76%	1	0.02%	419	7.76%	5,402
McLean	1,336	50.26%	1,163	43.75%	90	3.39%	27	1.02%	40	1.50%	2	0.08%	173	6.51%	2,658
Meade	1,245	58.34%	834	39.08%	18	0.84%	20	0.94%	17	0.80%	0	0.00%	411	19.26%	2,134
Menifee	719	61.04%	450	38.20%	6	0.51%	0	0.00%	3	0.25%	0	0.00%	269	22.84%	1,178
Mercer	1,703	51.76%	1,494	45.41%	68	2.07%	7	0.21%	17	0.52%	1	0.03%	209	6.35%	3,290
Metcalfe	1,011	46.87%	1,115	51.69%	21	0.97%	5	0.23%	5	0.23%	0	0.00%	-104	-4.82%	2,157
Monroe	779	31.80%	1,644	67.10%	14	0.57%	1	0.04%	12	0.49%	0	0.00%	-865	-35.31%	2,450
Montgomery	1,488	53.01%	1,266	45.10%	45	1.60%	6	0.21%	0	0.00%	2	0.07%	222	7.91%	2,807
Morgan	1,807	61.07%	1,119	37.82%	28	0.95%	0	0.00%	5	0.17%	0	0.00%	688	23.25%	2,959
Muhlenberg	1,954	42.90%	2,476	54.36%	42	0.92%	28	0.61%	41	0.90%	14	0.31%	-522	-11.46%	4,555
Nelson	2,160	61.98%	1,263	36.24%	47	1.35%	10	0.29%	4	0.11%	1	0.03%	897	25.74%	3,485
Nicholas	1,741	60.37%	1,067	37.00%	63	2.18%	3	0.10%	4	0.14%	6	0.21%	674	23.37%	2,884
Ohio	2,519	43.42%	3,063	52.79%	122	2.10%	14	0.24%	77	1.33%	7	0.12%	-544	-9.38%	5,802
Oldham	882	63.45%	452	32.52%	43	3.09%	9	0.65%	4	0.29%	0	0.00%	430	30.94%	1,390
Owen	2,932	76.79%	827	21.66%	41	1.07%	0	0.00%	12	0.31%	6	0.16%	2,105	55.13%	3,818
Owsley	224	16.83%	1,100	82.64%	7	0.53%	0	0.00%	0	0.00%	0	0.00%	-876	-65.82%	1,331
Pendleton	1,421	50.77%	1,246	44.52%	72	2.57%	42	1.50%	14	0.50%	4	0.14%	175	6.25%	2,799
Perry	431	30.35%	979	68.94%	6	0.42%	4	0.28%	0	0.00%	0	0.00%	-548	-38.59%	1,420
Pike	1,935	43.05%	2,486	55.31%	64	1.42%	4	0.09%	4	0.09%	2	0.04%	-551	-12.26%	4,495
Powell	738	52.23%	647	45.79%	23	1.63%	2	0.14%	3	0.21%	0	0.00%	91	6.44%	1,413
Pulaski	1,870	32.62%	3,713	64.78%	103	1.80%	21	0.37%	22	0.38%	3	0.05%	-1,843	-32.15%	5,732
Robertson	709	62.47%	409	36.04%	16	1.41%	1	0.09%	0	0.00%	0	0.00%	300	26.43%	1,135
Rockcastle	848	33.68%	1,624	64.50%	30	1.19%	4	0.16%	10	0.40%	2	0.08%	-776	-30.82%	2,518
Rowan	661	43.15%	844	55.09%	24	1.57%	1	0.07%	1	0.07%	1	0.07%	-183	-11.95%	1,532
Russell	671	36.85%	1,079	59.25%	58	3.19%	10	0.55%	1	0.05%	2	0.11%	-408	-22.41%	1,821
Scott	2,374	57.05%	1,713	41.17%	62	1.49%	10	0.24%	2	0.05%	0	0.00%	661	15.89%	4,161
Shelby	2,657	60.83%	1,638	37.50%	59	1.35%	4	0.09%	9	0.21%	1	0.02%	1,019	23.33%	4,368
Simpson	1,540	62.30%	863	34.91%	51	2.06%	1	0.04%	17	0.69%	0	0.00%	677	27.39%	2,472
Spencer	1,024	64.73%	529	33.44%	17	1.07%	0	0.00%	9	0.57%	3	0.19%	495	31.29%	1,582
Taylor	1,147	49.29%	1,092	46.93%	60	2.58%	3	0.13%	25	1.07%	0	0.00%	55	2.36%	2,327
Todd	1,671	50.18%	1,589	47.72%	39	1.17%	1	0.03%	29	0.87%	1	0.03%	82	2.46%	3,330
Trigg	1,170	45.05%	1,285	49.48%	37	1.42%	27	1.04%	76	2.93%	2	0.08%	-115	-4.43%	2,597
Trimble	1,275	76.21%	360	21.52%	28	1.67%	8	0.48%	2	0.12%	0	0.00%	915	54.69%	1,673
Union	2,533	67.80%	1,071	28.67%	44	1.18%	51	1.37%	30	0.80%	7	0.19%	1,462	39.13%	3,736
Warren	3,484	54.42%	2,737	42.75%	129	2.01%	19	0.30%	27	0.42%	6	0.09%	747	11.67%	6,402
Washington	1,482	49.92%	1,448	48.77%	31	1.04%	1	0.03%	7	0.24%	0	0.00%	34	1.15%	2,969
Wayne	1,202	42.29%	1,577	55.49%	57	2.01%	2	0.07%	2	0.07%	2	0.07%	-375	-13.19%	2,842
Webster	2,134	56.97%	1,453	38.79%	109	2.91%	5	0.13%	43	1.15%	2	0.05%	681	18.18%	3,746
Whitley	658	16.63%	3,174	80.23%	57	1.44%	52	1.31%	11	0.28%	4	0.10%	-2,516	-63.60%	3,956
Wolfe	1,114	62.03%	676	37.64%	5	0.28%	0	0.00%	1	0.06%	0	0.00%	438	24.39%	1,796
Woodford	1,620	55.21%	1,280	43.63%	27	0.92%	4	0.14%	2	0.07%	1	0.03%	340	11.59%	2,934
Totals	217,250	49.84%	205,277	47.10%	6,603	1.51%	3,597	0.83%	2,521	0.58%	607	0.14%	11,973	2.75%	435,855

== See also ==
- United States presidential elections in Kentucky
