= Kentucky Route 556 =

State highway in Kentucky, United States

Kentucky Route 556
- KY 556 highlighted in red

Route information
- Maintained by KYTC
- Length: 6.624 mi (10.660 km)

Major junctions
- West end: KY 173 at Lytten
- East end: KY 7 / Court Street in Sandy Hook

Location
- Country: United States
- State: Kentucky
- Counties: Elliott

Highway system
- Kentucky State Highway System; Interstate; US; State; Parkways
← KY 555	→ KY 557

Kentucky Route 556 (KY 556) is a 6.624-mile-long (10.660 km) state highway in Elliott County, Kentucky that runs from Kentucky Route 173 at Lytten to Kentucky Route 7 and Court Street in downtown Sandy Hook via Bigstone.

== Major intersections ==
The entire route is in Elliott County.

Location	mi	km	Destinations	Notes
Lytten	0.000	0.000	KY 173	Western terminus
	4.588	7.384	KY 557 east	Western terminus of KY 557
	6.219	10.009	KY 755 west (South Ruin Road)	Eastern terminus of KY 755
Sandy Hook	6.624	10.660	KY 7 (Main Street) / Court Street	Eastern terminus; continues as Court Street beyond KY 7
1.000 mi = 1.609 km; 1.000 km = 0.621 mi
