= Ordinary =

Ordinary or The Ordinary often refer to:

== Music ==
- Ordinary (EP) (2015), by South Korean group Beast
- Ordinary (album) (2011), by Every Little Thing
- "Ordinary" (Alex Warren song) (2025)
- "Ordinary" (Two Door Cinema Club song) (2016)
- "Ordinary" (Wayne Brady song) (2008)
- "Ordinary", song by Train from Alive at Last (2004)

== Religion ==
- Ordinary (Catholic Church), a supervisor, typically a bishop, in charge of a territory comparable to a diocese, or a major superior of a religious institute
- Ordinary (church officer), an officer of a church or civic authority who by reason of office has ordinary power to execute laws
- Ordinary (liturgy), a set of texts in Latin Catholic and other Western Christian liturgies that are generally invariable
- Ordinary Time, the parts of the Latin Catholic liturgical year that are outside Advent, Christmastide, Lent, and Eastertide.
- Ordinary (lecture), a type of lecture given in universities of the Middle Ages

== Other ==
- An archaic usage meaning tavern
- Ordinary (film), a 2012 Malayalam-language film
- Ordinary (heraldry), a simple geometrical figure displayed on a shield
- Ordinary of arms, a roll or register of coats of arms, arranged systematically by design
- Ordinary, Kentucky, an unincorporated community
- Ordinary, Virginia, an unincorporated community
- The Ordinary, novel by Jim Grimsley
- The Ordinary, play by William Cartwright
- The Ordinary (brand), Canada-based skincare brand founded by Brandon Truaxe
- Ordinary bicycle, the original type, the penny-farthing
