= National Register of Historic Places listings in Elliott County, Kentucky =

Location of Elliott County in Kentucky

This is a list of the National Register of Historic Places listings in Elliott County, Kentucky.

This is intended to be a detailed table of the property on the National Register of Historic Places in Elliott County, Kentucky, United States. The locations of National Register properties for which the latitude and longitude coordinates are included below, may be seen in a map.

There is 1 property listed on the National Register in the county.

This National Park Service list is complete through NPS recent listings posted December 12, 2025.

== Current listing ==
| | Name on the Register | Image | Date listed | Location | City or town | Description |
|---|---|---|---|---|---|---|
| 1 | Conley-Greene Rockshelter (15EL4) | | May 8, 1986 (#86001012) | Address Restricted | Lytten | |

== See also ==
- List of National Historic Landmarks in Kentucky
- National Register of Historic Places listings in Kentucky
