= Kentucky Route 173 =

State highway in Kentucky, United States

Kentucky Route 173
- KY 173 highlighted in red

Route information
- Maintained by KYTC
- Length: 10.648 mi (17.136 km)

Major junctions
- South end: KY 7 in rural Elliott Co
- North end: KY 32 in rural Rowan Co

Location
- Country: United States
- State: Kentucky
- Counties: Elliott, Rowan

Highway system
- Kentucky State Highway System; Interstate; US; State; Parkways
← KY 172	→ KY 174

Kentucky Route 173 (KY 173) is a 10.648-mile-long (17.136 km) state highway in Kentucky that runs from KY 7 in rural Elliott County southwest of Sandy Hook to KY 32 in rural Rowan County east of Morehead.

== Major intersections ==
County	Location	mi	km	Destinations	Notes
Elliott		0.000	0.000	KY 7	Southern terminus
Elliott		2.060	3.315	KY 755 east	Western terminus of KY 755
Elliott	Lytten	3.763	6.056	KY 556 east	Western terminus of KY 556
Elliott–Rowan county line		6.765	10.887	KY 711 south	Northern terminus of KY 711
Rowan		9.544	15.360	KY 1167 west (Oak Grove Road)	Eastern terminus of KY 1167
Rowan		10.648	17.136	KY 32 (Brown Ridge Road)	Northern terminus
1.000 mi = 1.609 km; 1.000 km = 0.621 mi
