= Gimlet, Kentucky =

Unincorporated community in Kentucky, United States

- Unincorporated community
- Location within the state of Kentucky Gimlet (the United States)
- Coordinates: 38°13′8″N 83°8′15″W
- Country: United States
- State: Kentucky
- County: Elliott
- Elevation: 1,102 ft (336 m)
- Time zone: UTC-5 (Eastern (EST))
  - Summer (DST): UTC-4 (EDT)
- GNIS feature ID: 508090

Gimlet is an unincorporated community in Elliott County, Kentucky, United States. It lies along Route 504 north of the city of Sandy Hook, the county seat of Elliott County. Its elevation is 1,102 feet (336 m).

A post office, established in 1880, closed in 1961. Gimlet is named for the gimlet tool, which is said to have the same crooked shape as the local creek.
