= Little Sandy, Kentucky =

Unincorporated community in Kentucky, United States

- Unincorporated community
- Location within the state of Kentucky Little; Sandy (the United States)
- Coordinates: 38°3′40″N 83°10′55″W
- Country: United States
- State: Kentucky
- County: Elliott
- Elevation: 787 ft (240 m)
- Time zone: UTC-5 (Eastern (EST))
  - Summer (DST): UTC-4 (EDT)
- GNIS feature ID: 496856

Little Sandy is an unincorporated community in Elliott County, Kentucky, United States. It lies along Route 7 southwest of the city of Sandy Hook, the county seat of Elliott County. Its elevation is 787 feet (240 m).
