= 2016 United States presidential election in Kentucky =

- November 8, 2016
- Turnout: 59.10% ▼

Nominee	Donald Trump	Hillary Clinton
Party	Republican	Democratic
Home state	New York	New York
Running mate	Mike Pence	Tim Kaine
Electoral vote	8	0
Popular vote	1,202,971	628,854
Percentage	62.52%	32.68%

Trump
40–50%
50–60%
60–70%
70–80%
80–90%
90–100%
Clinton
40–50%
50–60%
60–70%
70–80%
80–90%
90–100%
Tie/No Data
President before election
Barack Obama
Democratic
Elected President
Donald Trump
Republican

Treemap of the popular vote by county.

The 2016 United States presidential election in Kentucky was held on Tuesday, November 8, 2016, as part of the 2016 United States presidential election in which all 50 states plus the District of Columbia participated. Kentucky voters chose electors to represent them in the Electoral College via a popular vote, pitting the Republican Party's nominee, businessman Donald Trump, and running mate Indiana Governor Mike Pence against Democratic Party nominee, former Secretary of State Hillary Clinton, and her running mate Virginia Senator Tim Kaine. Kentucky has eight electoral votes in the Electoral College.

Although Kentucky was won twice by Southern Democrat Bill Clinton in 1992 and 1996, Trump easily carried the state with 62.52% of the vote to Hillary Clinton's 32.68%, a margin of 29.84%. Trump won Kentucky by the largest margin of any Republican up to that point, and he swept counties across the state. She carried only the state's two most urban and populous counties: Jefferson County, home to Louisville; and Fayette County, home to Lexington, both of which traditionally vote Democratic. Kentucky was also one of eleven states to have twice voted for Bill Clinton but against his wife Hillary in 2016.

Trump's victory in Kentucky made it his fifth-strongest state in the 2016 election after West Virginia, Wyoming, Oklahoma, and North Dakota. Most notably, Trump ended Elliott County's nearly 150-year tradition of voting Democratic in every presidential election, winning with 2,000 votes to Clinton's 740, or 70%–26%. Nevertheless, he became the first Republican since Warren G. Harding in 1920 to win the White House without carrying Fayette County.

== Caucuses ==
=== Republican caucus ===
Republican primary results by county. Donald Trump: 30–40%; 40–50%; 50–60%; 60–70%; Ted Cruz: 20–30%; 30–40%; 40–50%; 50–60%; 60–70%

Delegates were awarded to candidates who got 5% or more of the vote proportionally.

In order to avoid a local law forbidding one candidate to run for two offices in the same primary, Rand Paul paid to have a presidential caucus, which took place on March 5. Paul dropped out prior to this.

Kentucky Republican caucuses, March 2016
Candidate	Votes	Percentage	Actual delegate count		
Candidate	Votes	Percentage	Bound	Unbound	Total
Donald Trump	82,493	35.92%	17	0	17
Ted Cruz	72,503	31.57%	15	0	15
Marco Rubio	37,579	16.36%	7	0	7
John Kasich	33,134	14.43%	7	0	7
Ben Carson (withdrawn)	1,951	0.85%	0	0	0
Rand Paul (withdrawn)	872	0.38%	0	0	0
Uncommitted	496	0.22%	0	0	0
Jeb Bush (withdrawn)	305	0.13%	0	0	0
Mike Huckabee (withdrawn)	174	0.08%	0	0	0
Chris Christie (withdrawn)	65	0.03%	0	0	0
Carly Fiorina (withdrawn)	64	0.03%	0	0	0
Rick Santorum (withdrawn)	31	0.03%	0	0	0
Total:	229,667	100.00%	40	0	40
Source: The Green Papers, Republican Party of Kentucky

=== Democratic primary ===
Four candidates appeared on the Democratic presidential primary ballot:

- Hillary Clinton
- Bernie Sanders
- Rocky De La Fuente
- Martin O'Malley (withdrawn)

Kentucky Democratic primary, May 17, 2016
Candidate	Popular vote		Estimated delegates		
Candidate	Count	Percentage	Pledged	Unpledged	Total
Hillary Clinton	212,534	46.76%	28	2	30
Bernie Sanders	210,623	46.33%	27	0	27
Martin O'Malley (withdrawn)	5,713	1.26%			
Roque "Rocky" De La Fuente	1,594	0.35%			
Uncommitted	24,104	5.30%	0	3	3
Total	454,568	100%	55	5	60

== General election ==
=== Predictions ===
The following are final 2016 predictions from various organizations for Kentucky as of Election Day.

Source	Ranking	As of
Los Angeles Times	Safe R	November 6, 2016
CNN	Safe R	November 8, 2016
Sabato's Crystal Ball	Safe R	November 7, 2016
NBC	Likely R	November 7, 2016
RealClearPolitics	Safe R	November 8, 2016
Fox News	Safe R	November 7, 2016
ABC	Safe R	November 7, 2016

=== Results ===
2016 United States presidential election in Kentucky
Party	Candidate	Votes	%
Republican	Donald Trump	1,202,971	62.52%
Democratic	Hillary Clinton	628,854	32.68%
Libertarian	Gary Johnson	53,752	2.79%
Independent	Evan McMullin	22,780	1.18%
Green	Jill Stein	13,913	0.72%
Write-in		1,879	0.10%
Total votes		1,924,149	100.00%

==== By county ====
County	Donald Trump Republican		Hillary Clinton Democratic		Various candidates Other parties		Margin		Total
County	#	%	#	%	#	%	#	%	Total
Adair	6,637	80.61%	1,323	16.07%	273	3.32%	5,314	64.54%	8,233
Allen	6,466	79.87%	1,349	16.66%	281	3.47%	5,117	63.21%	8,096
Anderson	8,242	72.16%	2,634	23.06%	546	4.78%	5,608	49.10%	11,422
Ballard	3,161	77.08%	816	19.90%	124	3.02%	2,345	57.18%	4,101
Barren	13,483	72.93%	4,275	23.12%	730	3.95%	9,208	49.81%	18,488
Bath	3,082	67.19%	1,361	29.67%	144	3.14%	1,721	37.52%	4,587
Bell	7,764	79.89%	1,720	17.70%	234	2.41%	6,044	62.19%	9,718
Boone	39,082	67.83%	15,026	26.08%	3,510	6.09%	24,056	41.75%	57,618
Bourbon	5,569	63.26%	2,791	31.71%	443	5.03%	2,778	31.55%	8,803
Boyd	13,591	66.45%	6,021	29.44%	842	4.11%	7,570	37.01%	20,454
Boyle	8,040	62.10%	4,281	33.07%	625	4.83%	3,759	29.03%	12,946
Bracken	2,711	76.86%	705	19.99%	111	3.15%	2,006	56.87%	3,527
Breathitt	3,991	69.55%	1,537	26.79%	210	3.66%	2,454	42.76%	5,738
Breckinridge	6,484	73.90%	1,960	22.34%	330	3.76%	4,524	51.56%	8,774
Bullitt	26,210	72.67%	8,255	22.89%	1,604	4.44%	17,955	49.78%	36,069
Butler	4,428	79.41%	947	16.98%	201	3.61%	3,481	62.43%	5,576
Caldwell	4,507	75.43%	1,260	21.09%	208	3.48%	3,247	54.34%	5,975
Calloway	10,367	64.60%	4,749	29.59%	933	5.81%	5,618	35.01%	16,049
Campbell	25,050	58.93%	14,658	34.48%	2,802	6.59%	10,392	24.45%	42,510
Carlisle	2,094	80.51%	432	16.61%	75	2.88%	1,662	63.90%	2,601
Carroll	2,588	67.13%	1,106	28.69%	161	4.18%	1,482	38.44%	3,855
Carter	7,587	73.82%	2,276	22.14%	415	4.04%	5,311	51.68%	10,278
Casey	5,482	85.14%	767	11.91%	190	2.95%	4,715	73.23%	6,439
Christian	14,108	63.89%	7,188	32.55%	787	3.56%	6,920	31.34%	22,083
Clark	10,710	66.09%	4,706	29.04%	789	4.87%	6,004	37.05%	16,205
Clay	5,861	86.61%	752	11.11%	154	2.28%	5,109	75.50%	6,767
Clinton	3,809	85.37%	547	12.26%	106	2.37%	3,262	73.11%	4,462
Crittenden	3,290	81.50%	617	15.28%	130	3.22%	2,673	66.22%	4,037
Cumberland	2,502	81.60%	459	14.97%	105	3.43%	2,043	66.63%	3,066
Daviess	28,907	63.11%	14,163	30.92%	2,737	5.97%	14,744	32.19%	45,807
Edmonson	4,135	78.85%	979	18.67%	130	2.48%	3,156	60.18%	5,244
Elliott	2,000	70.05%	740	25.92%	115	4.03%	1,260	44.13%	2,855
Estill	4,236	76.39%	1,108	19.98%	201	3.63%	3,128	56.41%	5,545
Fayette	56,894	41.74%	69,778	51.19%	9,643	7.07%	-12,884	-9.45%	136,315
Fleming	4,722	75.43%	1,348	21.53%	190	3.04%	3,374	53.90%	6,260
Floyd	11,993	72.51%	4,015	24.27%	532	3.22%	7,978	48.24%	16,540
Franklin	11,819	49.52%	10,717	44.91%	1,329	5.57%	1,102	4.61%	23,865
Fulton	1,549	65.03%	774	32.49%	59	2.48%	775	32.54%	2,382
Gallatin	2,443	73.19%	749	22.44%	146	4.37%	1,694	50.75%	3,338
Garrard	5,904	77.45%	1,453	19.06%	266	3.49%	4,451	58.39%	7,623
Grant	7,268	76.03%	1,910	19.98%	381	3.99%	5,358	56.05%	9,559
Graves	12,671	76.30%	3,308	19.92%	627	3.78%	9,363	56.38%	16,606
Grayson	8,219	77.71%	1,959	18.52%	398	3.77%	6,260	59.19%	10,576
Green	4,372	81.98%	832	15.60%	129	2.42%	3,540	66.38%	5,333
Greenup	11,546	70.93%	4,146	25.47%	585	3.60%	7,400	45.46%	16,277
Hancock	2,788	64.91%	1,244	28.96%	263	6.13%	1,544	35.95%	4,295
Hardin	26,971	62.50%	13,944	32.31%	2,241	5.19%	13,027	30.19%	43,156
Harlan	9,129	84.87%	1,372	12.75%	256	2.38%	7,757	72.12%	10,757
Harrison	5,435	69.85%	2,031	26.10%	315	4.05%	3,404	43.75%	7,781
Hart	5,320	73.24%	1,730	23.82%	214	2.94%	3,590	49.42%	7,264
Henderson	12,159	61.69%	6,707	34.03%	844	4.28%	5,452	27.66%	19,710
Henry	4,944	69.16%	1,828	25.57%	377	5.27%	3,116	43.59%	7,149
Hickman	1,657	76.82%	449	20.82%	51	2.36%	1,208	56.00%	2,157
Hopkins	15,277	75.09%	4,310	21.18%	758	3.73%	10,967	53.91%	20,345
Jackson	4,889	88.87%	482	8.76%	130	2.37%	4,407	80.11%	5,501
Jefferson	143,768	40.72%	190,836	54.05%	18,496	5.23%	-47,068	-13.33%	353,100
Jessamine	15,474	66.34%	6,144	26.34%	1,708	7.32%	9,330	40.00%	23,326
Johnson	8,043	84.03%	1,250	13.06%	279	2.91%	6,793	70.97%	9,572
Kenton	42,958	59.67%	24,214	33.63%	4,826	6.70%	18,744	26.04%	71,998
Knott	4,357	75.60%	1,245	21.60%	161	2.80%	3,112	54.00%	5,763
Knox	9,885	82.29%	1,761	14.66%	366	3.05%	8,124	67.63%	12,012
LaRue	4,799	75.37%	1,278	20.07%	290	4.56%	3,521	55.30%	6,367
Laurel	20,592	82.92%	3,440	13.85%	801	3.23%	17,152	69.07%	24,833
Lawrence	4,816	79.71%	1,045	17.30%	181	2.99%	3,771	62.41%	6,042
Lee	2,151	80.65%	444	16.65%	72	2.70%	1,707	64.00%	2,667
Leslie	4,015	89.38%	400	8.90%	74	1.72%	3,615	80.48%	4,492
Letcher	7,293	79.84%	1,542	16.88%	299	3.28%	5,751	62.96%	9,134
Lewis	4,363	82.35%	785	14.82%	150	2.83%	3,578	67.53%	5,298
Lincoln	7,338	76.75%	1,865	19.51%	358	3.74%	5,473	57.24%	9,561
Livingston	3,570	76.86%	887	19.10%	188	4.04%	2,683	57.76%	4,645
Logan	7,778	71.36%	2,755	25.28%	366	3.36%	5,023	46.08%	10,899
Lyon	2,789	70.39%	1,045	26.38%	128	3.23%	1,744	44.01%	3,962
McCracken	20,774	66.36%	9,134	29.18%	1,399	4.46%	11,640	37.18%	31,307
McCreary	5,012	86.77%	664	11.50%	100	1.73%	4,348	75.27%	5,776
McLean	3,381	74.05%	988	21.64%	197	4.31%	2,393	52.41%	4,566
Madison	23,431	62.70%	11,793	31.56%	2,147	5.74%	11,638	31.14%	37,371
Magoffin	3,824	74.75%	1,172	22.91%	120	2.34%	2,652	51.84%	5,116
Marion	5,122	63.15%	2,679	33.03%	310	3.82%	2,443	30.12%	8,111
Marshall	12,322	73.79%	3,672	21.99%	704	4.22%	8,650	51.80%	16,698
Martin	3,503	88.62%	363	9.18%	87	2.20%	3,140	79.44%	3,953
Mason	4,944	68.49%	1,970	27.29%	305	4.22%	2,974	41.20%	7,219
Meade	8,660	70.80%	3,026	24.74%	545	4.46%	5,634	46.06%	12,231
Menifee	2,010	72.33%	700	25.19%	69	2.48%	1,310	47.14%	2,779
Mercer	7,740	73.12%	2,395	22.63%	450	4.25%	5,345	50.49%	10,585
Metcalfe	3,491	75.56%	976	21.13%	153	3.31%	2,515	54.43%	4,620
Monroe	4,278	85.71%	601	12.04%	112	2.25%	3,677	73.67%	4,991
Montgomery	7,856	68.60%	3,158	27.58%	438	3.82%	4,698	41.02%	11,452
Morgan	3,628	75.98%	1,006	21.07%	141	2.95%	2,622	54.91%	4,775
Muhlenberg	9,393	71.92%	3,272	25.05%	395	3.03%	6,121	46.87%	13,060
Nelson	13,431	64.57%	6,434	30.93%	937	4.50%	6,997	33.64%	20,802
Nicholas	1,957	68.88%	787	27.70%	97	3.42%	1,170	41.18%	2,841
Ohio	7,942	76.38%	2,080	20.00%	376	3.62%	5,862	56.38%	10,398
Oldham	20,469	62.30%	10,268	31.25%	2,116	6.45%	10,201	31.05%	32,853
Owen	3,745	74.89%	1,062	21.24%	194	3.87%	2,683	53.65%	5,001
Owsley	1,474	83.80%	256	14.55%	29	1.65%	1,218	69.25%	1,759
Pendleton	4,604	76.64%	1,164	19.38%	239	3.98%	3,440	57.26%	6,007
Perry	8,158	77.17%	2,136	20.20%	278	2.63%	6,022	56.97%	10,572
Pike	19,747	80.06%	4,280	17.35%	638	2.59%	15,467	62.71%	24,665
Powell	3,513	70.87%	1,272	25.66%	172	3.47%	2,241	45.21%	4,957
Pulaski	22,902	81.67%	4,208	15.01%	931	3.32%	18,694	66.66%	28,041
Robertson	759	74.93%	222	21.92%	32	3.15%	537	53.01%	1,013
Rockcastle	5,609	83.83%	915	13.68%	167	2.49%	4,694	70.15%	6,691
Rowan	5,174	58.48%	3,295	37.24%	379	4.28%	1,879	21.24%	8,848
Russell	6,863	83.96%	1,093	13.37%	218	2.67%	5,770	70.59%	8,174
Scott	15,052	62.20%	7,715	31.88%	1,433	5.92%	7,337	30.32%	24,200
Shelby	13,196	64.12%	6,276	30.50%	1,108	5.38%	6,920	33.62%	20,580
Simpson	5,077	67.41%	2,144	28.47%	310	4.12%	2,933	38.94%	7,531
Spencer	7,196	75.63%	1,921	20.19%	398	4.18%	5,275	55.44%	9,515
Taylor	8,320	73.59%	2,553	22.58%	433	3.83%	5,767	51.01%	11,306
Todd	3,612	75.58%	1,042	21.80%	125	2.62%	2,570	53.78%	4,779
Trigg	4,931	73.04%	1,587	23.51%	233	3.45%	3,344	49.53%	6,751
Trimble	2,771	72.96%	879	23.14%	148	3.90%	1,892	49.82%	3,798
Union	4,701	75.69%	1,331	21.43%	179	2.88%	3,370	54.26%	6,211
Warren	28,673	59.18%	16,966	35.01%	2,815	5.81%	11,707	24.17%	48,454
Washington	4,013	71.20%	1,420	25.20%	203	3.60%	2,593	46.00%	5,636
Wayne	6,371	79.72%	1,431	17.91%	190	2.37%	4,940	61.81%	7,992
Webster	4,397	75.75%	1,240	21.36%	168	2.89%	3,157	54.39%	5,805
Whitley	11,312	82.13%	2,067	15.01%	395	2.86%	9,245	67.12%	13,774
Wolfe	1,804	68.46%	753	28.58%	78	2.96%	1,051	39.88%	2,635
Woodford	7,697	56.75%	4,958	36.56%	908	6.69%	2,739	20.19%	13,563
Totals	1,202,971	62.52%	628,854	32.68%	92,325	4.80%	574,117	29.84%	1,924,150

Counties that flipped from Democratic to Republican

- Elliot (largest city: Sandy Hook)
- Franklin (largest city: Frankfort)

==== By congressional district ====
Trump won five of six congressional districts.

District	Trump	Clinton	Representative
1st	72%	24%	Ed Whitfield
1st	72%	24%	James Comer
2nd	68%	28%	Brett Guthrie
3rd	40%	55%	John Yarmuth
4th	65%	29%	Thomas Massie
5th	80%	17%	Hal Rogers
6th	55%	39%	Andy Barr

== See also ==
- Democratic Party presidential debates, 2016
- Democratic Party presidential primaries, 2016
- Republican Party presidential debates, 2016
- Republican Party presidential primaries, 2016
