= Culver, Kentucky =

Unincorporated community in Kentucky, United States

- Unincorporated community
- Location within the state of Kentucky Culver (the United States)
- Coordinates: 38°5′2″N 82°59′28″W
- Country: United States
- State: Kentucky
- County: Elliott
- Elevation: 735 ft (224 m)
- Time zone: UTC-5 (Eastern (EST))
  - Summer (DST): UTC-4 (EDT)
- GNIS feature ID: 507793

Culver is an unincorporated community in Elliott County, Kentucky, United States. It lies along Route 486 east of the city of Sandy Hook, the county seat of Elliott County. Its elevation is 735 feet (224 m).
