= 1892 United States presidential election in Kentucky =

- November 8, 1892

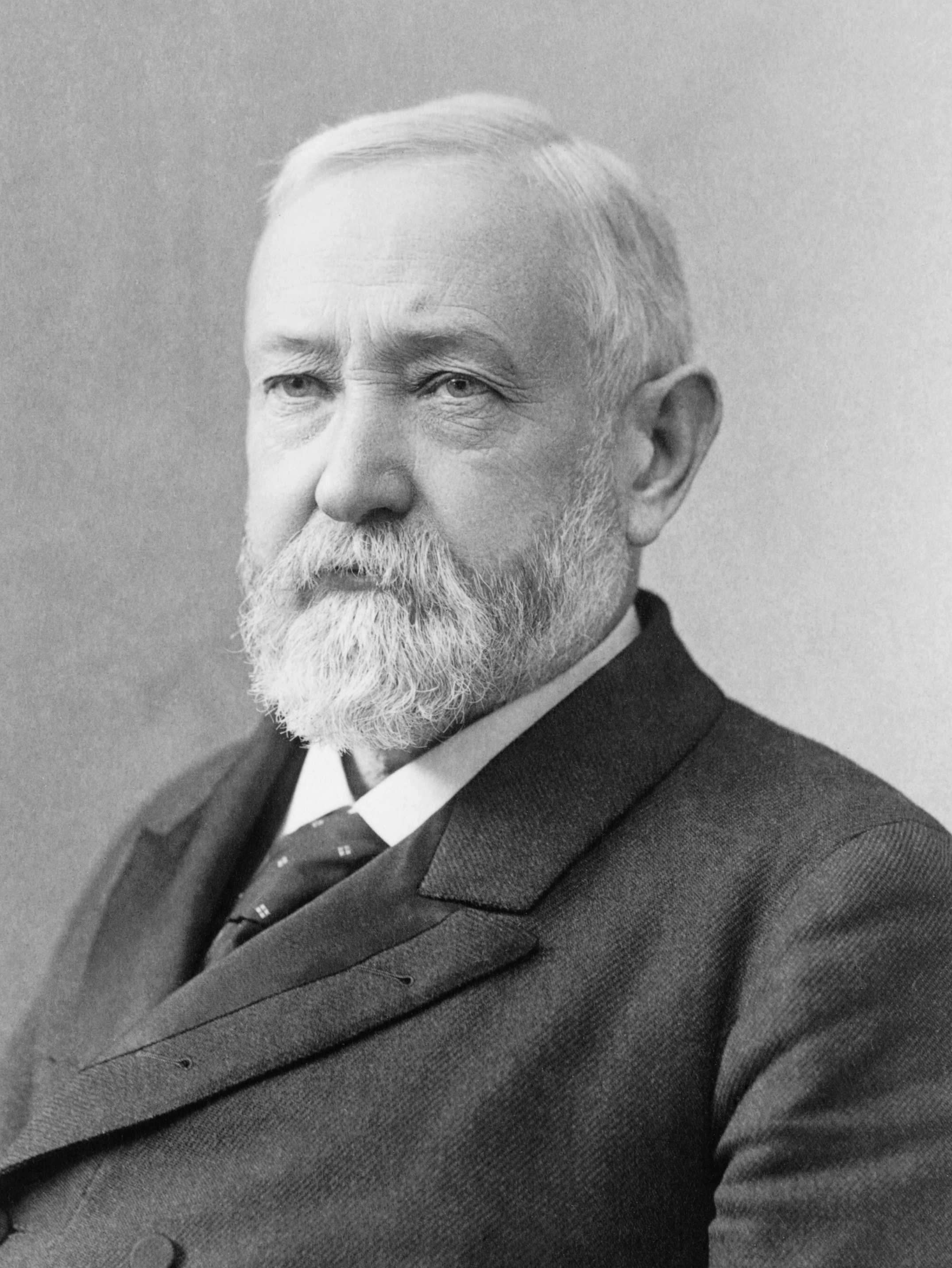

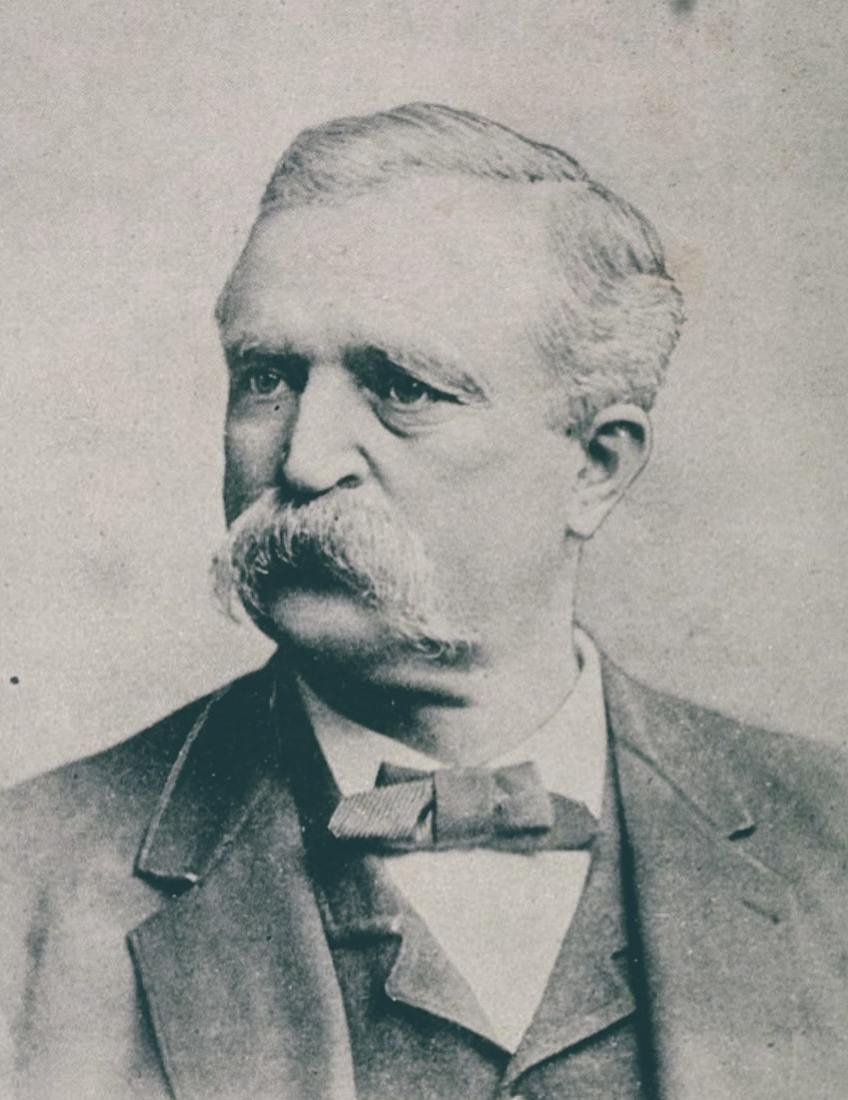
Nominee	Grover Cleveland	Benjamin Harrison	James B. Weaver
Party	Democratic	Republican	People’s
Home state	New York	Indiana	Iowa
Running mate	Adlai Stevenson I	Whitelaw Reid	James G. Field
Electoral vote	13	0	0
Popular vote	175,461	135,462	23,500
Percentage	51.48%	39.74%	6.89%
County results
Cleveland
30–40%
40–50%
50–60%
60–70%
70–80%
Harrison
30–40%
40–50%
50–60%
60–70%
70–80%
80–90%
President before election
Benjamin Harrison
Republican
Elected President
Grover Cleveland
Democratic

The 1892 United States presidential election in Kentucky took place on November 8, 1892. All contemporary 44 states were part of the 1892 United States presidential election. Kentucky voters chose thirteen electors to the Electoral College, which selected the president and vice president.

Ever since the Civil War, Kentucky had been shaped politically by divisions created by that war between secessionist, Democratic counties and Unionist, Republican ones, although the state as a whole leaned Democratic throughout this era and the GOP would never carry the state during the Third Party System at either presidential or gubernatorial level.

However, at the beginning of the 1890s, the state was hit by a crisis in its farming sector, which was especially severe in its most secessionist region – the historically slaveholding and dark-tobacco-growing Jackson Purchase which was badly affected by changes in taste amongst the nation's smokers. That region had been the centre of Greenback revolt over a decade previously, and a continuation of the trends meant that the “Kentucky Alliance” was formed in 1887. During the state's 1891 Constitutional Convention, the Alliance made a number of demands on taxation and labor reform, and sent to the state legislature thirteen men, mostly from the Purchase and Western Coal Field.

The Populist threat, however, would be dissipated by the work of Democratic vice presidential nominee Adlai Stevenson I, whose campaign in the state emphasized the potential impact of the Lodge Force Bill and high tariffs upon the South, and sought to achieve a degree of reconciliation between sections greater than existed in 1890. His extensive tour of the state and warning that a vote for Weaver would be a vote for Republican nominee Benjamin Harrison meant that third-time Democratic nominee Grover Cleveland – whose stance in favor of the gold standard was unpopular in the South – would carry the state by almost the same margin as in 1888.

== Results ==
1892 United States presidential election in Kentucky
Party	Candidate	Votes	Percentage	Electoral votes
Democratic	Grover Cleveland	175,461	51.48%	13
Republican	Benjamin Harrison (incumbent)	135,462	39.74%	0
People's	James B. Weaver	23,500	6.89%	0
Prohibition	John Bidwell	6,441	1.89%	0
Totals		340,864	100.00%	13
Voter turnout				—

=== Results by county ===
County	Stephen Grover Cleveland Democratic		Benjamin Harrison Republican		James Baird Weaver People's		John Bidwell Prohibition		Margin		Total votes cast
County	#	%	#	%	#	%	#	%	#	%	Total votes cast
Adair	1,024	43.17%	1,119	47.18%	208	8.77%	21	0.89%	-95	-4.01%	2,372
Allen	1,116	46.75%	989	41.43%	257	10.77%	25	1.05%	127	5.32%	2,387
Anderson	1,142	58.06%	749	38.08%	20	1.02%	56	2.85%	393	19.98%	1,967
Ballard	910	64.04%	277	19.49%	221	15.55%	13	0.91%	633	44.55%	1,421
Barren	2,061	51.43%	1,369	34.17%	524	13.08%	53	1.32%	692	17.27%	4,007
Bath	1,443	53.92%	1,148	42.90%	51	1.91%	34	1.27%	295	11.02%	2,676
Bell	693	39.67%	1,019	58.33%	20	1.14%	15	0.86%	-326	-18.66%	1,747
Boone	2,009	77.39%	545	20.99%	10	0.39%	32	1.23%	1,464	56.39%	2,596
Bourbon	2,216	55.86%	1,657	41.77%	15	0.38%	79	1.99%	559	14.09%	3,967
Boyd	1,537	49.20%	1,526	48.85%	25	0.80%	36	1.15%	11	0.35%	3,124
Boyle	1,249	50.10%	1,144	45.89%	48	1.93%	52	2.09%	105	4.21%	2,493
Bracken	1,472	55.74%	996	37.71%	111	4.20%	62	2.35%	476	18.02%	2,641
Breathitt	977	62.87%	566	36.42%	6	0.39%	5	0.32%	411	26.45%	1,554
Breckinridge	1,497	45.75%	1,167	35.67%	576	17.60%	32	0.98%	330	10.09%	3,272
Bullitt	862	60.75%	398	28.05%	143	10.08%	16	1.13%	464	32.70%	1,419
Butler	715	29.61%	1,327	54.95%	330	13.66%	43	1.78%	-612	-25.34%	2,415
Caldwell	960	39.59%	1,126	46.43%	281	11.59%	58	2.39%	-166	-6.85%	2,425
Calloway	1,581	65.01%	379	15.58%	439	18.05%	33	1.36%	1,142 (Note: In this county where Harrison ran third behind both Cleveland and Weaver, margin given is Cleveland vote minus Weaver vote and percentage margin Cleveland percentage minus Weaver percentage.)	46.96%	2,432
Campbell	4,302	50.79%	3,959	46.74%	112	1.32%	97	1.15%	343	4.05%	8,470
Carlisle	811	57.19%	223	15.73%	348	24.54%	36	2.54%	463	32.65%	1,418
Carroll	1,574	71.81%	542	24.73%	3	0.14%	73	3.33%	1,032	47.08%	2,192
Carter	983	41.13%	1,319	55.19%	61	2.55%	27	1.13%	-336	-14.06%	2,390
Casey	1,039	44.04%	1,223	51.84%	20	0.85%	77	3.26%	-184	-7.80%	2,359
Christian	2,324	40.01%	2,868	49.38%	510	8.78%	106	1.83%	-544	-9.37%	5,808
Clark	1,958	53.98%	1,599	44.09%	33	0.91%	37	1.02%	359	9.90%	3,627
Clay	401	29.97%	860	64.28%	60	4.48%	17	1.27%	-459	-34.30%	1,338
Clinton	250	26.91%	589	63.40%	83	8.93%	7	0.75%	-339	-36.49%	929
Crittenden	1,118	42.61%	1,312	50.00%	145	5.53%	49	1.87%	-194	-7.39%	2,624
Cumberland	584	39.17%	880	59.02%	8	0.54%	19	1.27%	-296	-19.85%	1,491
Daviess	3,431	50.87%	1,638	24.29%	1,602	23.75%	73	1.08%	1,793	26.59%	6,744
Edmonson	491	39.37%	618	49.56%	119	9.54%	19	1.52%	-127	-10.18%	1,247
Elliott	1,079	68.73%	453	28.85%	36	2.29%	2	0.13%	626	39.87%	1,570
Estill	690	42.20%	752	45.99%	177	10.83%	16	0.98%	-62	-3.79%	1,635
Fayette	3,753	57.42%	2,431	37.19%	101	1.55%	251	3.84%	1,322	20.23%	6,536
Fleming	1,787	50.42%	1,567	44.22%	92	2.60%	98	2.77%	220	6.21%	3,544
Floyd	1,141	62.32%	634	34.63%	42	2.29%	14	0.76%	507	27.69%	1,831
Franklin	2,186	59.65%	1,231	33.59%	163	4.45%	85	2.32%	955	26.06%	3,665
Fulton	1,157	70.25%	383	23.25%	74	4.49%	33	2.00%	774	46.99%	1,647
Gallatin	737	73.77%	237	23.72%	5	0.50%	20	2.00%	500	50.05%	999
Garrard	1,126	48.16%	1,155	49.40%	10	0.43%	47	2.01%	-29	-1.24%	2,338
Grant	1,591	57.50%	1,034	37.37%	76	2.75%	66	2.39%	557	20.13%	2,767
Graves	2,563	57.22%	1,028	22.95%	832	18.58%	56	1.25%	1,535	34.27%	4,479
Grayson	1,251	39.69%	1,173	37.21%	701	22.24%	27	0.86%	78	2.47%	3,152
Green	585	31.22%	739	39.43%	535	28.55%	15	0.80%	-154	-8.22%	1,874
Greenup	1,109	48.43%	1,143	49.91%	16	0.70%	22	0.96%	-34	-1.48%	2,290
Hancock	786	45.57%	607	35.19%	318	18.43%	14	0.81%	179	10.38%	1,725
Hardin	1,909	54.31%	1,075	30.58%	490	13.94%	41	1.17%	834	23.73%	3,515
Harlan	231	24.32%	674	70.95%	34	3.58%	11	1.16%	-443	-46.63%	950
Harrison	2,172	59.28%	1,273	34.74%	11	0.30%	208	5.68%	899	24.54%	3,664
Hart	1,414	47.18%	1,034	34.50%	509	16.98%	40	1.33%	380	12.68%	2,997
Henderson	2,278	44.83%	1,746	34.36%	971	19.11%	86	1.69%	532	10.47%	5,081
Henry	1,793	58.25%	1,019	33.11%	160	5.20%	106	3.44%	774	25.15%	3,078
Hickman	1,155	61.05%	460	24.31%	227	12.00%	50	2.64%	695	36.73%	1,892
Hopkins	2,014	45.98%	1,726	39.41%	555	12.67%	85	1.94%	288	6.58%	4,380
Jackson	188	17.55%	868	81.05%	8	0.75%	7	0.65%	-680	-63.49%	1,071
Jefferson	20,919	59.29%	13,454	38.13%	358	1.01%	551	1.56%	7,465	21.16%	35,282
Jessamine	1,042	48.33%	922	42.76%	15	0.70%	177	8.21%	120	5.57%	2,156
Johnson	785	35.33%	1,340	60.31%	72	3.24%	25	1.13%	-555	-24.98%	2,222
Kenton	5,686	59.57%	3,494	36.61%	155	1.62%	210	2.20%	2,192	22.96%	9,545
Knott	566	70.49%	236	29.39%	0	0.00%	1	0.12%	330	41.10%	803
Knox	668	32.15%	1,305	62.80%	87	4.19%	18	0.87%	-637	-30.65%	2,078
Larue	797	46.97%	568	33.47%	285	16.79%	47	2.77%	229	13.49%	1,697
Laurel	832	41.25%	1,080	53.54%	73	3.62%	32	1.59%	-248	-12.30%	2,017
Lawrence	1,724	53.51%	1,445	44.85%	33	1.02%	20	0.62%	279	8.66%	3,222
Lee	507	46.64%	565	51.98%	12	1.10%	3	0.28%	-58	-5.34%	1,087
Leslie	76	12.54%	528	87.13%	1	0.17%	1	0.17%	-452	-74.59%	606
Letcher	274	34.68%	513	64.94%	2	0.25%	1	0.13%	-239	-30.25%	790
Lewis	1,044	36.39%	1,531	53.36%	251	8.75%	43	1.50%	-487	-16.97%	2,869
Lincoln	1,473	51.06%	1,175	40.73%	42	1.46%	195	6.76%	298	10.33%	2,885
Livingston	928	55.57%	550	32.93%	175	10.48%	17	1.02%	378	22.63%	1,670
Logan	2,191	47.77%	1,763	38.43%	592	12.91%	41	0.89%	428	9.33%	4,587
Lyon	727	52.42%	499	35.98%	131	9.44%	30	2.16%	228	16.44%	1,387
Madison	2,565	51.04%	2,312	46.01%	30	0.60%	118	2.35%	253	5.03%	5,025
Magoffin	660	41.59%	844	53.18%	73	4.60%	10	0.63%	-184	-11.59%	1,587
Marion	1,451	57.06%	954	37.51%	108	4.25%	30	1.18%	497	19.54%	2,543
Marshall	1,081	54.02%	360	17.99%	537	26.84%	23	1.15%	544	27.19%	2,001
Martin	229	31.94%	475	66.25%	7	0.98%	6	0.84%	-246	-34.31%	717
Mason	2,586	55.04%	2,001	42.59%	46	0.98%	65	1.38%	585	12.45%	4,698
McCracken	1,735	51.09%	1,195	35.19%	366	10.78%	100	2.94%	540	15.90%	3,396
McLean	869	47.07%	534	28.93%	407	22.05%	36	1.95%	335	18.15%	1,846
Meade	1,171	65.35%	416	23.21%	189	10.55%	16	0.89%	755	42.13%	1,792
Menifee	475	58.79%	258	31.93%	62	7.67%	13	1.61%	217	26.86%	808
Mercer	1,562	52.73%	1,185	40.01%	76	2.57%	139	4.69%	377	12.73%	2,962
Metcalfe	495	30.11%	756	45.99%	382	23.24%	11	0.67%	-261	-15.88%	1,644
Monroe	631	31.19%	1,125	55.61%	256	12.65%	11	0.54%	-494	-24.42%	2,023
Montgomery	1,507	57.61%	1,041	39.79%	18	0.69%	50	1.91%	466	17.81%	2,616
Morgan	1,125	55.45%	620	30.56%	279	13.75%	5	0.25%	505	24.89%	2,029
Muhlenberg	1,421	41.93%	1,688	49.81%	243	7.17%	37	1.09%	-267	-7.88%	3,389
Nelson	1,858	60.76%	1,025	33.52%	151	4.94%	24	0.78%	833	27.24%	3,058
Nicholas	1,312	54.90%	808	33.81%	45	1.88%	225	9.41%	504	21.09%	2,390
Ohio	1,664	39.04%	1,581	37.10%	973	22.83%	44	1.03%	83	1.95%	4,262
Oldham	783	62.64%	365	29.20%	62	4.96%	40	3.20%	418	33.44%	1,250
Owen	2,579	69.93%	748	20.28%	177	4.80%	184	4.99%	1,831	49.65%	3,688
Owsley	229	25.19%	660	72.61%	19	2.09%	1	0.11%	-431	-47.41%	909
Pendleton	1,419	44.76%	1,014	31.99%	658	20.76%	79	2.49%	405	12.78%	3,170
Perry	346	37.77%	560	61.14%	8	0.87%	2	0.22%	-214	-23.36%	916
Pike	1,534	52.99%	1,333	46.04%	7	0.24%	21	0.73%	201	6.94%	2,895
Powell	580	54.61%	446	42.00%	30	2.82%	6	0.56%	134	12.62%	1,062
Pulaski	1,753	38.28%	2,457	53.66%	239	5.22%	130	2.84%	-704	-15.37%	4,579
Robertson	567	53.64%	438	41.44%	17	1.61%	35	3.31%	129	12.20%	1,057
Rockcastle	684	40.00%	966	56.49%	6	0.35%	54	3.16%	-282	-16.49%	1,710
Rowan	562	47.95%	564	48.12%	31	2.65%	15	1.28%	-2	-0.17%	1,172
Russell	646	43.89%	765	51.97%	52	3.53%	9	0.61%	-119	-8.08%	1,472
Scott	1,999	59.12%	1,201	35.52%	9	0.27%	172	5.09%	798	23.60%	3,381
Shelby	2,122	61.10%	1,169	33.66%	142	4.09%	40	1.15%	953	27.44%	3,473
Simpson	1,166	55.29%	725	34.38%	171	8.11%	47	2.23%	441	20.91%	2,109
Spencer	848	68.28%	316	25.44%	58	4.67%	20	1.61%	532	42.83%	1,242
Taylor	653	39.94%	630	38.53%	326	19.94%	26	1.59%	23	1.41%	1,635
Todd	1,587	49.81%	1,406	44.13%	134	4.21%	59	1.85%	181	5.68%	3,186
Trigg	1,088	46.86%	814	35.06%	396	17.05%	24	1.03%	274	11.80%	2,322
Trimble	1,149	78.00%	264	17.92%	18	1.22%	42	2.85%	885	60.08%	1,473
Union	2,275	66.95%	777	22.87%	318	9.36%	28	0.82%	1,498	44.08%	3,398
Warren	2,867	54.02%	2,053	38.68%	252	4.75%	135	2.54%	814	15.34%	5,307
Washington	1,193	47.89%	1,035	41.55%	238	9.55%	25	1.00%	158	6.34%	2,491
Wayne	931	45.59%	986	48.29%	105	5.14%	20	0.98%	-55	-2.69%	2,042
Webster	1,278	43.10%	839	28.30%	824	27.79%	24	0.81%	439	14.81%	2,965
Whitley	619	25.61%	1,734	71.74%	27	1.12%	37	1.53%	-1,115	-46.13%	2,417
Wolfe	658	57.42%	386	33.68%	82	7.16%	20	1.75%	272	23.73%	1,146
Woodford	1,289	51.91%	1,097	44.18%	30	1.21%	67	2.70%	192	7.73%	2,483
Totals	175,465	51.48%	135,467	39.74%	23,500	6.89%	6,439	1.89%	39,998	11.73%	340,871

== See also ==
- United States presidential elections in Kentucky
