= Conlee =

Conlee (a variant of Conley) is a surname of Irish origin. It has many variations in spelling.

It may refer to:

- Jenny Conlee (b. 1971), accordionist/pianist for the indie rock band The Decemberists.
- John Conlee (b. 1946), country music singer.

== See also ==
- Connolly (surname)
- Connelly (surname)
