= Devil's Fork =

Devil's Fork, Devils Fork and Devil Fork can refer to:

- The blivet, also known as the Devil's tuning fork, an optical illusion
- Devils Fork State Park, a 622-acre (2.52 km^{2}) park in Northwestern South Carolina
- Bidens frondosa, an herb native to North America
- The Devils Fork, a tributary of the Little Red River in Arkansas
- Devil Fork, Kentucky
- Devils Fork, West Virginia
