= Ordinary, Kentucky =

Unincorporated community in Kentucky, United States

- Unincorporated community
- Location within Kentucky
- Coordinates: 38°09′17″N 83°11′41″W
- Country: United States
- State: Kentucky
- County: Elliott
- Elevation: 1,115 ft (340 m)
- Time zone: UTC-5 (Eastern (EST))
  - Summer (DST): UTC-4 (EDT)
- Area code: 606
- GNIS feature ID: 508755

Ordinary is an unincorporated community in Elliott County, Kentucky. Ordinary is located on Kentucky Route 32 6 miles (9.7 km) northwest of Sandy Hook.
