= Dewdrop, Kentucky =

Unincorporated community in Kentucky, United States

- Unincorporated community
- Location within the state of Kentucky Dewdrop (the United States)
- Coordinates: 38°8′44″N 83°8′24″W
- Country: United States
- State: Kentucky
- County: Elliott
- Elevation: 1,043 ft (318 m)
- Time zone: UTC-5 (Eastern (EST))
  - Summer (DST): UTC-4 (EDT)
- GNIS feature ID: 507851

Dewdrop is an unincorporated community within Elliott County, Kentucky, United States.
