= 1936 United States presidential election in Kentucky =

- November 3, 1936

All 11 Kentucky votes to the Electoral College

Nominee	Franklin D. Roosevelt	Alf Landon
Party	Democratic	Republican
Home state	New York	Kansas
Running mate	John Nance Garner	Frank Knox
Electoral vote	11	0
Popular vote	541,944	369,702
Percentage	58.51%	39.92%
County results
Roosevelt
50–60%
60–70%
70–80%
80–90%
Landon
40–50%
50–60%
60–70%
70–80%
80–90%
President before election
Franklin D. Roosevelt
Democratic
Elected President
Franklin D. Roosevelt
Democratic

The 1936 United States presidential election in Kentucky took place on November 3, 1936, as part of the 1936 United States presidential election. Kentucky voters chose 11 representatives, or electors, to the Electoral College, who voted for president and vice president.

Kentucky was won by incumbent President Franklin D. Roosevelt (D–New York), running with Vice President John Nance Garner, with 58.51 percent of the popular vote, against Governor Alf Landon (R–Kansas), running with Frank Knox, with 39.92 percent of the popular vote.

In this election, Kentucky voted 5.65 percentage points more Republican than the nation at-large.

== Results ==
1936 United States presidential election in Kentucky
Party	Candidate	Votes	%
Democratic	Franklin D. Roosevelt (inc.)	541,944	58.51%
Republican	Alf Landon	369,702	39.92%
Union	William Lemke	12,501	1.35%
Prohibition	D. Leigh Colvin	929	0.10%
Socialist	Norman Thomas	632	0.07%
Socialist Labor	John W. Aiken	294	0.03%
Communist	Earl R. Browder	204	0.02%
Total votes		926,206	100%

=== Results by county ===
1936 United States presidential election in Kentucky by county
County	Franklin Delano Roosevelt Democratic		Alfred Mossman Landon Republican		William Frederick Lemke Union		Various candidates Other parties		Margin		Total votes cast
County	#	%	#	%	#	%	#	%	#	%	Total votes cast
Adair	2,669	44.12%	3,371	55.72%	2	0.03%	8	0.13%	-702	-11.60%	6,050
Allen	2,422	44.00%	3,070	55.77%	3	0.05%	10	0.18%	-648	-11.77%	5,505
Anderson	2,454	64.16%	1,360	35.56%	2	0.05%	9	0.24%	1,094	28.60%	3,825
Ballard	3,523	81.87%	773	17.96%	2	0.05%	5	0.12%	2,750	63.91%	4,303
Barren	5,137	60.34%	3,352	39.38%	4	0.05%	20	0.23%	1,785	20.97%	8,513
Bath	2,795	61.70%	1,725	38.08%	1	0.02%	9	0.20%	1,070	23.62%	4,530
Bell	5,853	55.95%	4,573	43.71%	2	0.02%	33	0.32%	1,280	12.24%	10,461
Boone	2,785	71.14%	1,042	26.62%	82	2.09%	6	0.15%	1,743	44.52%	3,915
Bourbon	3,872	60.84%	2,471	38.83%	10	0.16%	11	0.17%	1,401	22.01%	6,364
Boyd	9,762	59.19%	6,650	40.32%	43	0.26%	37	0.22%	3,112	18.87%	16,492
Boyle	4,148	62.79%	2,431	36.80%	5	0.08%	22	0.33%	1,717	25.99%	6,606
Bracken	1,956	56.79%	1,436	41.70%	38	1.10%	14	0.41%	520	15.10%	3,444
Breathitt	3,980	68.85%	1,790	30.96%	1	0.02%	10	0.17%	2,190	37.88%	5,781
Breckinridge	3,233	51.94%	2,898	46.55%	35	0.56%	59	0.95%	335	5.38%	6,225
Bullitt	2,474	78.89%	647	20.63%	7	0.22%	8	0.26%	1,827	58.26%	3,136
Butler	1,237	32.26%	2,594	67.64%	1	0.03%	3	0.08%	-1,357	-35.38%	3,835
Caldwell	2,699	55.67%	2,121	43.75%	18	0.37%	10	0.21%	578	11.92%	4,848
Calloway	5,523	85.34%	939	14.51%	3	0.05%	7	0.11%	4,584	70.83%	6,472
Campbell	16,780	55.57%	10,327	34.20%	2,984	9.88%	103	0.34%	6,453	21.37%	30,194
Carlisle	2,150	82.69%	420	16.15%	25	0.96%	5	0.19%	1,730	66.54%	2,600
Carroll	2,718	76.63%	794	22.39%	25	0.70%	10	0.28%	1,924	54.24%	3,547
Carter	3,403	43.57%	4,372	55.98%	18	0.23%	17	0.22%	-969	-12.41%	7,810
Casey	1,925	34.77%	3,588	64.81%	7	0.13%	16	0.29%	-1,663	-30.04%	5,536
Christian	6,660	55.36%	5,370	44.64%	0	0.00%	0	0.00%	1,290	10.72%	12,030
Clark	4,396	66.02%	2,246	33.73%	6	0.09%	11	0.17%	2,150	32.29%	6,659
Clay	1,572	27.78%	4,087	72.22%	0	0.00%	0	0.00%	-2,515	-44.44%	5,659
Clinton	701	24.61%	2,147	75.39%	0	0.00%	0	0.00%	-1,446	-50.77%	2,848
Crittenden	1,926	44.02%	2,441	55.79%	4	0.09%	4	0.09%	-515	-11.77%	4,375
Cumberland	935	30.51%	2,127	69.40%	2	0.07%	1	0.03%	-1,192	-38.89%	3,065
Daviess	9,957	64.88%	4,636	30.21%	736 (Note: Totals for Lemke and “other” candidates in this county are different from those in Géoelections, whose Lemke figure is greater than the total non-major-party vote from America at the Polls. They have been adjusted to match the totals found in Dave Leip’s Atlas.)	4.80%	18	0.12%	5,321	34.67%	15,347
Edmonson	1,329	34.43%	2,526	65.44%	5	0.13%	0	0.00%	-1,197	-31.01%	3,860
Elliott	1,539	76.23%	480	23.77%	0	0.00%	0	0.00%	1,059	52.45%	2,019
Estill	2,646	47.33%	2,931	52.43%	2	0.04%	11	0.20%	-285	-5.10%	5,590
Fayette	14,428	55.12%	11,544	44.10%	130	0.50%	73	0.28%	2,884	11.02%	26,175
Fleming	2,879	50.96%	2,749	48.66%	12	0.21%	9	0.16%	130	2.30%	5,649
Floyd	7,962	70.23%	3,375	29.77%	0	0.00%	0	0.00%	4,587	40.46%	11,337
Franklin	6,222	75.35%	2,010	24.34%	18	0.22%	8	0.10%	4,212	51.01%	8,258
Fulton	3,727	82.35%	782	17.28%	6	0.13%	11	0.24%	2,945	65.07%	4,526
Gallatin	1,456	77.65%	404	21.55%	13	0.69%	2	0.11%	1,052	56.11%	1,875
Garrard	2,276	50.19%	2,252	49.66%	0	0.00%	7	0.15%	24	0.53%	4,535
Grant	2,560	64.99%	1,353	34.35%	20	0.51%	6	0.15%	1,207	30.64%	3,939
Graves	9,231	83.43%	1,692	15.29%	123	1.11%	19	0.17%	7,539	68.13%	11,065
Grayson	2,676	47.76%	2,907	51.88%	9	0.16%	11	0.20%	-231	-4.12%	5,603
Green	1,970	45.69%	2,336	54.17%	2	0.05%	4	0.09%	-366	-8.49%	4,312
Greenup	4,686	54.12%	3,973	45.88%	0	0.00%	0	0.00%	713	8.23%	8,659
Hancock	1,317	54.38%	1,087	44.88%	13	0.54%	5	0.21%	230	9.50%	2,422
Hardin	4,480	65.75%	2,284	33.52%	37	0.54%	13	0.19%	2,196	32.23%	6,814
Harlan	11,060	59.56%	7,510	40.44%	0	0.00%	0	0.00%	3,550	19.12%	18,570
Harrison	4,378	71.20%	1,756	28.56%	2	0.03%	13	0.21%	2,622	42.64%	6,149
Hart	3,341	51.31%	3,147	48.33%	5	0.08%	18	0.28%	194	2.98%	6,511
Henderson	6,835	77.38%	1,811	20.50%	132	1.49%	55	0.62%	5,024	56.88%	8,833
Henry	3,545	69.99%	1,516	29.93%	3	0.06%	1	0.02%	2,029	40.06%	5,065
Hickman	2,548	86.31%	385	13.04%	13	0.44%	6	0.20%	2,163	73.27%	2,952
Hopkins	8,193	69.21%	3,602	30.43%	15	0.13%	28	0.24%	4,591	38.78%	11,838
Jackson	420	10.87%	3,440	89.05%	0	0.00%	3	0.08%	-3,020	-78.18%	3,863
Jefferson	85,748	60.23%	53,043	37.26%	3,150	2.21%	428	0.30%	32,705	22.97%	142,369
Jessamine	2,813	57.38%	2,066	42.15%	4	0.08%	19	0.39%	747	15.24%	4,902
Johnson	3,106	41.81%	4,305	57.95%	9	0.12%	9	0.12%	-1,199	-16.14%	7,429
Kenton	21,879	63.11%	8,885	25.63%	3,768	10.87%	134	0.39%	12,994	37.48%	34,666
Knott	3,488	80.13%	865	19.87%	0	0.00%	0	0.00%	2,623	60.26%	4,353
Knox	3,419	40.97%	4,921	58.97%	5	0.06%	0	0.00%	-1,502	-18.00%	8,345
Larue	2,305	66.48%	1,151	33.20%	7	0.20%	4	0.12%	1,154	33.29%	3,467
Laurel	2,677	35.76%	4,798	64.08%	6	0.08%	6	0.08%	-2,121	-28.33%	7,487
Lawrence	3,175	51.81%	2,944	48.04%	4	0.07%	5	0.08%	231	3.77%	6,128
Lee	1,440	44.25%	1,812	55.69%	0	0.00%	2	0.06%	-372	-11.43%	3,254
Leslie	618	18.52%	2,716	81.39%	0	0.00%	3	0.09%	-2,098	-62.87%	3,337
Letcher	6,240	61.65%	3,871	38.24%	5	0.05%	6	0.06%	2,369	23.40%	10,122
Lewis	1,985	37.76%	3,255	61.92%	9	0.17%	8	0.15%	-1,270	-24.16%	5,257
Lincoln	3,575	52.37%	3,211	47.04%	12	0.18%	28	0.41%	364	5.33%	6,826
Livingston	1,897	64.37%	1,039	35.26%	2	0.07%	9	0.31%	858	29.11%	2,947
Logan	4,912	72.82%	1,812	26.86%	5	0.07%	16	0.24%	3,100	45.96%	6,745
Lyon	1,861	66.49%	929	33.19%	5	0.18%	4	0.14%	932	33.30%	2,799
Madison	6,259	50.57%	6,034	48.76%	7	0.06%	76	0.61%	225	1.82%	12,376
Magoffin	2,554	49.72%	2,577	50.17%	2	0.04%	4	0.08%	-23	-0.45%	5,137
Marion	3,526	68.52%	1,567	30.45%	39	0.76%	14	0.27%	1,959	38.07%	5,146
Marshall	3,472	75.09%	1,141	24.68%	2	0.04%	9	0.19%	2,331	50.41%	4,624
Martin	817	28.62%	2,037	71.35%	1	0.04%	0	0.00%	-1,220	-42.73%	2,855
Mason	4,503	56.52%	3,317	41.63%	122	1.53%	25	0.31%	1,186	14.89%	7,967
McCracken	10,557	76.34%	3,160	22.85%	54	0.39%	58	0.42%	7,397	53.49%	13,829
McCreary	1,105	27.16%	2,953	72.57%	3	0.07%	8	0.20%	-1,848	-45.42%	4,069
McLean	2,496	64.35%	1,338	34.49%	30	0.77%	15	0.39%	1,158	29.85%	3,879
Meade	2,102	70.85%	785	26.46%	73	2.46%	7	0.24%	1,317	44.39%	2,967
Menifee	1,123	66.61%	559	33.16%	4	0.24%	0	0.00%	564	33.45%	1,686
Mercer	3,659	62.59%	2,161	36.97%	5	0.09%	21	0.36%	1,498	25.62%	5,846
Metcalfe	1,748	49.52%	1,777	50.34%	2	0.06%	3	0.08%	-29	-0.82%	3,530
Monroe	1,352	36.48%	2,345	63.28%	5	0.13%	4	0.11%	-993	-26.79%	3,706
Montgomery	2,594	60.79%	1,649	38.65%	16	0.37%	8	0.19%	945	22.15%	4,267
Morgan	3,256	71.86%	1,269	28.01%	5	0.11%	1	0.02%	1,987	43.85%	4,531
Muhlenberg	6,385	60.08%	4,168	39.22%	60	0.56%	15	0.14%	2,217	20.86%	10,628
Nelson	4,234	66.59%	1,913	30.09%	188	2.96%	23	0.36%	2,321	36.51%	6,358
Nicholas	2,325	64.23%	1,277	35.28%	8	0.22%	10	0.28%	1,048	28.95%	3,620
Ohio	4,030	46.92%	4,532	52.77%	9	0.10%	18	0.21%	-502	-5.84%	8,589
Oldham	2,020	72.30%	760	27.20%	7	0.25%	7	0.25%	1,260	45.10%	2,794
Owen	3,392	83.44%	661	16.26%	6	0.15%	6	0.15%	2,731	67.18%	4,065
Owsley	464	16.95%	2,273	83.02%	1	0.04%	0	0.00%	-1,809	-66.07%	2,738
Pendleton	2,432	56.41%	1,837	42.61%	21	0.49%	21	0.49%	595	13.80%	4,311
Perry	6,753	59.45%	4,595	40.45%	6	0.05%	5	0.04%	2,158	19.00%	11,359
Pike	11,382	58.06%	8,210	41.88%	1	0.01%	10	0.05%	3,172	16.18%	19,603
Powell	1,185	53.94%	998	45.43%	0	0.00%	14	0.64%	187	8.51%	2,197
Pulaski	4,711	38.29%	7,570	61.52%	5	0.04%	19	0.15%	-2,859	-23.23%	12,305
Robertson	897	63.93%	498	35.50%	1	0.07%	7	0.50%	399	28.44%	1,403
Rockcastle	1,568	28.81%	3,875	71.19%	0	0.00%	0	0.00%	-2,307	-42.38%	5,443
Rowan	1,989	53.99%	1,687	45.79%	3	0.08%	5	0.14%	302	8.20%	3,684
Russell	1,235	31.33%	2,688	68.19%	3	0.08%	16	0.41%	-1,453	-36.86%	3,942
Scott	3,966	67.93%	1,861	31.88%	4	0.07%	7	0.12%	2,105	36.06%	5,838
Shelby	4,384	69.40%	1,898	30.05%	12	0.19%	23	0.36%	2,486	39.35%	6,317
Simpson	3,027	70.72%	1,240	28.97%	1	0.02%	12	0.28%	1,787	41.75%	4,280
Spencer	1,647	71.80%	638	27.81%	7	0.31%	2	0.09%	1,009	43.98%	2,294
Taylor	2,732	49.75%	2,738	49.86%	0	0.00%	21	0.38%	-6	-0.11%	5,491
Todd	2,987	71.53%	1,178	28.21%	1	0.02%	10	0.24%	1,809	43.32%	4,176
Trigg	2,928	65.53%	1,521	34.04%	15	0.34%	4	0.09%	1,407	31.49%	4,468
Trimble	1,659	85.16%	271	13.91%	4	0.21%	14	0.72%	1,388	71.25%	1,948
Union	4,713	81.47%	965	16.68%	104	1.80%	3	0.05%	3,748	64.79%	5,785
Warren	8,113	64.83%	4,347	34.74%	16	0.13%	38	0.30%	3,766	30.09%	12,514
Washington	2,516	50.90%	2,391	48.37%	23	0.47%	13	0.26%	125	2.53%	4,943
Wayne	2,546	46.46%	2,924	53.36%	4	0.07%	6	0.11%	-378	-6.90%	5,480
Webster	4,788	70.49%	1,983	29.20%	5	0.07%	16	0.24%	2,805	41.30%	6,792
Whitley	3,175	35.59%	5,733	64.27%	4	0.04%	8	0.09%	-2,558	-28.68%	8,920
Wolfe	1,577	61.87%	972	38.13%	0	0.00%	0	0.00%	605	23.73%	2,549
Woodford	2,574	62.20%	1,558	37.65%	3	0.07%	3	0.07%	1,016	24.55%	4,138
Totals	541,944	58.51%	369,702	39.92%	12,501	1.35%	2,059	0.22%	172,242	18.60%	926,214

==== Counties that flipped from Democratic to Republican ====
- Adair
- Carter
- Estill
- Grayson
- Lee
- Magoffin
- Metcalfe
- Taylor
- Wayne

==== Counties that flipped from Republican to Democratic ====
- Harlan
