= Gomez, Kentucky =

Unincorporated community in Kentucky, United States

- Unincorporated community
- Location within the state of Kentucky Gomez (the United States)
- Coordinates: 38°10′2″N 82°58′13″W
- Country: United States
- State: Kentucky
- County: Elliott
- Elevation: 728 ft (222 m)
- Time zone: UTC-5 (Eastern (EST))
  - Summer (DST): UTC-4 (EDT)
- GNIS feature ID: 2337152

Gomez is an unincorporated community within Elliott County, Kentucky, United States.
