= Conley (disambiguation) =

Conley may refer to:

== Surname ==
Conley, an Irish surname

== Buildings, bridges, and roads ==
- John D. Conley House, a two-story Victorian dwelling of wooden frame construction in Laramie, WY, listed on the NRHP in Wyoming
- Sanford F. Conley House, an ornate eighteenth century residence in Columbia, MO, listed on the NRHP in Missouri
- Conley-Maass-Downs Building, a commercial building in Rochester, MN, listed on the NRHP in Minnesota
- Conley's Ford Covered Bridge, Parke County, IN, listed on the NRHP in Indiana
- Conley Road, a thoroughfare in southeast Atlanta, GA
- Conley-Greene Rockshelter, a prehistoric site in Lytten, KY listed on the NRHP in Kentucky

== Case law ==
- Conley v. Gibson, a case decided by the Supreme Court of the United States (1957)

== Places ==
- Conley, Georgia, a town in the United States
- Conley Township, Holt County, Nebraska

== Schools ==
- Conley-Caraballo High School
- J. Michael Conley Elementary School at Southwood

== Others ==
- Conleyus, a genus of crabs, named after the collector Harry T. Conley
