= Conley-Greene Rockshelter (15EL4) =

- Conley--Greene Rockshelter (15EL4)
- U.S. National Register of Historic Places
- Nearest city: Lytten, Kentucky
- Area: less than one acre
- NRHP reference No.: 86001012
- Added to NRHP: May 8, 1986

The Conley-Greene Rockshelter, also known as site 15EL4, is an archeological site in Elliott County, Kentucky. It was listed on the National Register of Historic Places in 1986.

It appears to have been a campsite during the late Early Woodland period. The site has a thin midden and a 1991 study identified seven features including earthen ovens and basin-shaped pits.
