= Edsel, Kentucky =

Unincorporated community in Kentucky, United States

- Unincorporated community
- Location within the state of Kentucky Edsel (the United States)
- Coordinates: 38°7′4″N 82°54′34″W
- Country: United States
- State: Kentucky
- County: Elliott
- Elevation: 791 ft (241 m)
- Time zone: UTC-5 (Eastern (EST))
  - Summer (DST): UTC-4 (EDT)
- GNIS feature ID: 507914

Edsel is an unincorporated community within Elliott County, Kentucky, United States. Its post office is closed.

A post office was established in the community in 1929 and it was named Edsel for the postmaster's nephew.
