= Stark, Kentucky =

Unincorporated community in Kentucky, United States

- Unincorporated community
- Location within the state of Kentucky Stark (the United States)
- Coordinates: 38°10′25″N 83°8′6″W
- Country: United States
- State: Kentucky
- County: Elliott
- Elevation: 935 ft (285 m)
- Time zone: UTC-5 (Eastern (EST))
  - Summer (DST): UTC-4 (EDT)
- ZIP codes: 41176
- GNIS feature ID: 509121

Stark is an unincorporated community within Elliott County, Kentucky, United States.
