= 1888 United States presidential election in Kentucky =

- November 6, 1888
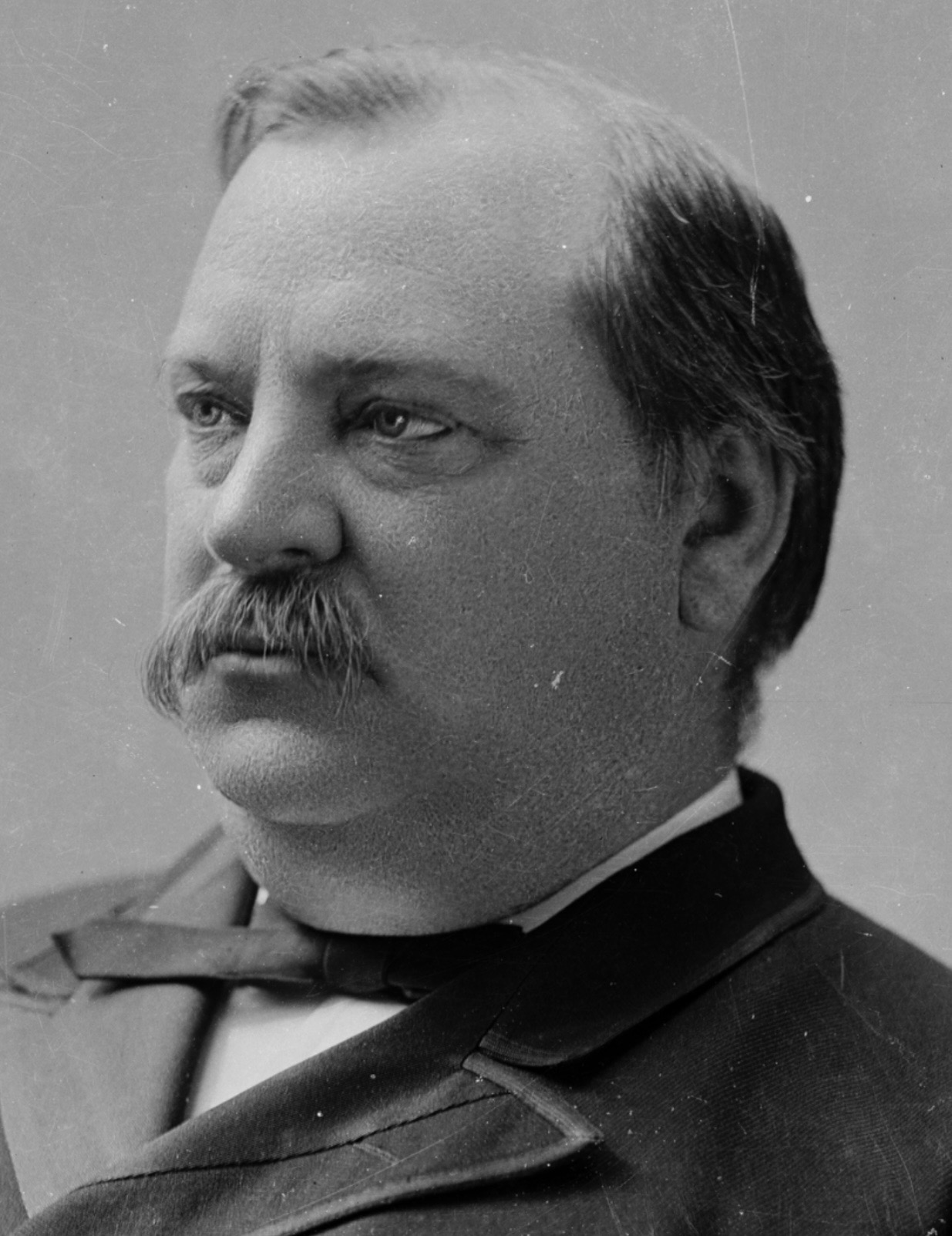

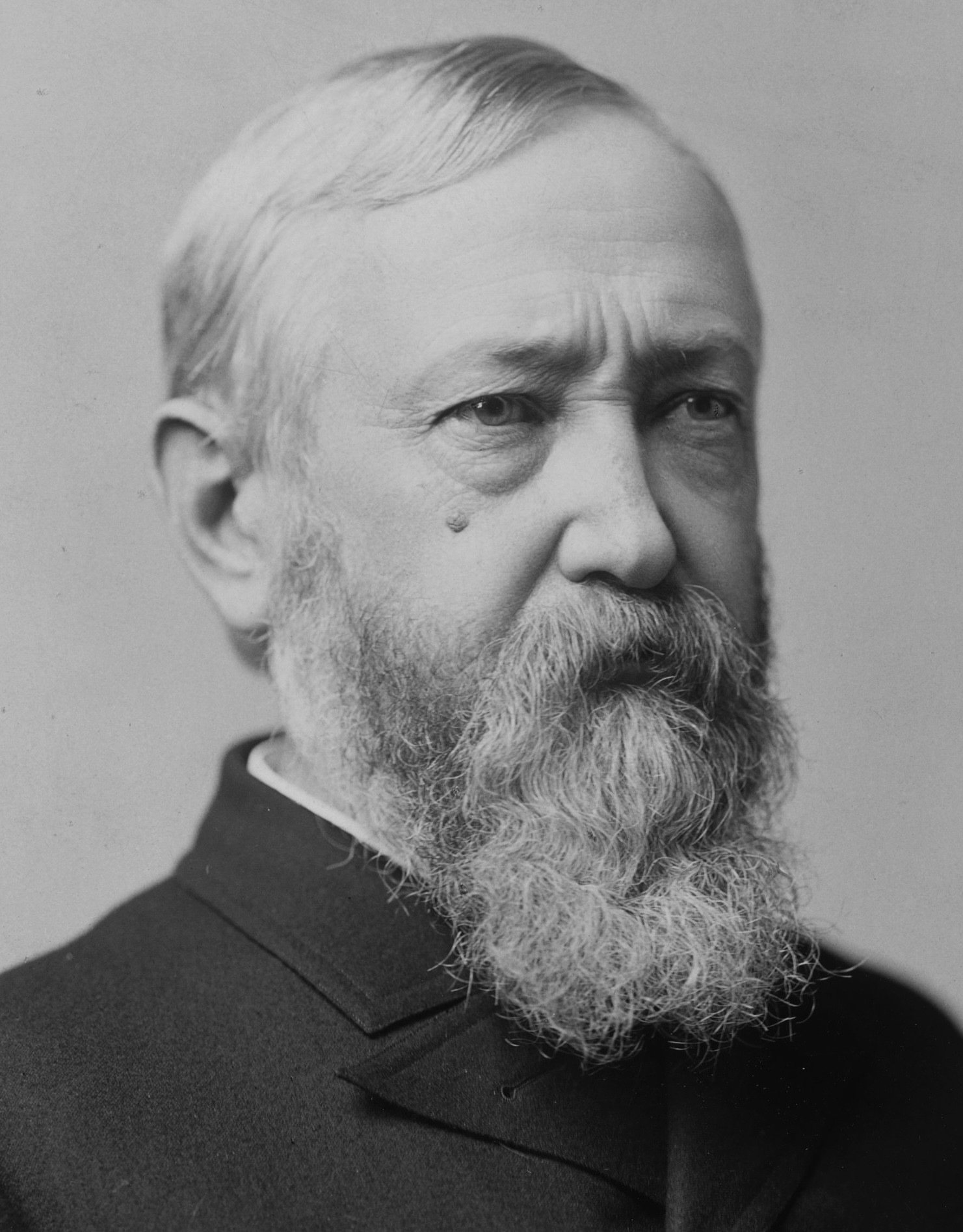
Nominee	Grover Cleveland	Benjamin Harrison
Party	Democratic	Republican
Home state	New York	Indiana
Running mate	Allen Thurman	Levi P. Morton
Electoral vote	13	0
Popular vote	183,830	155,138
Percentage	53.30%	44.98%
County results
Cleveland
40–50%
50–60%
60–70%
70–80%
80–90%
Harrison
40–50%
50–60%
60–70%
70–80%
80–90%
90–100%
President before election
Grover Cleveland
Democratic
Elected President
Benjamin Harrison
Republican

The 1888 United States presidential election in Kentucky took place on November 6, 1888. All contemporary thirty-eight states were part of the 1888 United States presidential election. Voters chose thirteen electors to the Electoral College, which selected the president and vice president.

Ever since the Civil War, Kentucky had been shaped politically by divisions created by that war between secessionist, Democratic counties and Unionist, Republican ones, although the state as a whole leaned Democratic throughout this era and the GOP would never carry the state during the Third Party System at either presidential or gubernatorial level. What would become a long-lived partisan system after the state was freed from the direct control of former Confederates would not be seriously affected by the first post-war insurgency movement – that of the Greenback Party at the tail end of the 1870s in the secessionist Jackson Purchase region. Incumbent president Grover Cleveland lost four points on his 1884 performance, but still carried the state comfortably against Republican nominee Benjamin Harrison.

As of the 2024 presidential election, this is the last occasion when a Democratic presidential candidate passed thirty percent in rock-ribbed Unionist and Republican Clinton County.

== Results ==
Presidential Candidate	Running Mate	Party	Electoral Vote (EV)	Popular Vote (PV)	
Grover Cleveland (incumbent)	Allen G. Thurman	Democratic	13	183,830	53.30%
Benjamin Harrison	Levi P. Morton	Republican	0	155,138	44.98%
Clinton B. Fisk	John A. Brooks	Prohibition	0	5,223	1.51%
Alson Streeter	Charles E. Cunningham	Union Labor	0	677	0.20%

=== Results by county ===
County	Stephen Grover Cleveland Democratic		Benjamin Harrison Republican		Clinton Bowen Fisk Prohibition		Alson Jenness Streeter Union Labor		Margin		Total votes cast
County	#	%	#	%	#	%	#	%	#	%	Total votes cast
Adair	1,128	46.12%	1,283	52.45%	35	1.43%	0	0.00%	-155	-6.34%	2,446
Allen	1,527	52.69%	1,326	45.76%	45	1.55%	0	0.00%	201	6.94%	2,898
Anderson	1,235	60.69%	742	36.46%	58	2.85%	0	0.00%	493	24.23%	2,035
Ballard	961	74.27%	321	24.81%	12	0.93%	0	0.00%	640	49.46%	1,294
Barren	2,749	59.49%	1,791	38.76%	81	1.75%	0	0.00%	958	20.73%	4,621
Bath	1,545	52.43%	1,362	46.22%	37	1.26%	3	0.10%	183	6.21%	2,947
Bell	279	23.10%	928	76.82%	1	0.08%	0	0.00%	-649	-53.73%	1,208
Boone	2,116	76.42%	635	22.93%	18	0.65%	0	0.00%	1,481	53.49%	2,769
Bourbon	1,990	48.75%	2,052	50.27%	40	0.98%	0	0.00%	-62	-1.52%	4,082
Boyd	1,302	45.68%	1,531	53.72%	17	0.60%	0	0.00%	-229	-8.04%	2,850
Boyle	1,399	49.56%	1,367	48.42%	57	2.02%	0	0.00%	32	1.13%	2,823
Bracken	1,702	59.70%	1,066	37.39%	83	2.91%	0	0.00%	636	22.31%	2,851
Breathitt	636	54.92%	505	43.61%	17	1.47%	0	0.00%	131	11.31%	1,158
Breckinridge	1,826	50.61%	1,769	49.03%	13	0.36%	0	0.00%	57	1.58%	3,608
Bullitt	996	68.78%	429	29.63%	23	1.59%	0	0.00%	567	39.16%	1,448
Butler	973	36.20%	1,637	60.90%	78	2.90%	0	0.00%	-664	-24.70%	2,688
Caldwell	1,098	49.82%	1,080	49.00%	26	1.18%	0	0.00%	18	0.82%	2,204
Calloway	995	72.21%	340	24.67%	22	1.60%	21	1.52%	655	47.53%	1,378
Campbell	4,160	49.71%	4,141	49.48%	41	0.49%	27	0.32%	19	0.23%	8,369
Carlisle	848	74.00%	271	23.65%	27	2.36%	0	0.00%	577	50.35%	1,146
Carroll	1,632	70.10%	623	26.76%	69	2.96%	4	0.17%	1,009	43.34%	2,328
Carter	1,373	43.14%	1,773	55.70%	37	1.16%	0	0.00%	-400	-12.57%	3,183
Casey	1,125	47.07%	1,204	50.38%	61	2.55%	0	0.00%	-79	-3.31%	2,390
Christian	2,247	37.74%	3,481	58.46%	104	1.75%	122	2.05%	-1,234	-20.73%	5,954
Clark	1,835	54.68%	1,467	43.71%	54	1.61%	0	0.00%	368	10.97%	3,356
Clay	652	31.91%	1,390	68.04%	1	0.05%	0	0.00%	-738	-36.12%	2,043
Clinton	409	30.84%	903	68.10%	14	1.06%	0	0.00%	-494	-37.25%	1,326
Crittenden	1,175	45.83%	1,357	52.93%	18	0.70%	14	0.55%	-182	-7.10%	2,564
Cumberland	677	39.92%	1,016	59.91%	3	0.18%	0	0.00%	-339	-19.99%	1,696
Daviess	3,818	62.44%	2,238	36.60%	59	0.96%	0	0.00%	1,580	25.84%	6,115
Edmonson	762	49.54%	764	49.67%	12	0.78%	0	0.00%	-2	-0.13%	1,538
Elliott	1,090	71.71%	426	28.03%	4	0.26%	0	0.00%	664	43.68%	1,520
Estill	835	47.39%	917	52.04%	10	0.57%	0	0.00%	-82	-4.65%	1,762
Fayette	3,435	50.08%	3,301	48.13%	122	1.78%	1	0.01%	134	1.95%	6,859
Fleming	1,813	50.01%	1,711	47.20%	101	2.79%	0	0.00%	102	2.81%	3,625
Floyd	1,122	61.68%	690	37.93%	7	0.38%	0	0.00%	432	23.75%	1,819
Franklin	2,334	61.55%	1,429	37.68%	26	0.69%	3	0.08%	905	23.87%	3,792
Fulton	933	71.44%	333	25.50%	38	2.91%	2	0.15%	600	45.94%	1,306
Gallatin	821	70.78%	313	26.98%	25	2.16%	1	0.09%	508	43.79%	1,160
Garrard	1,124	47.15%	1,220	51.17%	38	1.59%	2	0.08%	-96	-4.03%	2,384
Grant	1,604	57.45%	1,126	40.33%	62	2.22%	0	0.00%	478	17.12%	2,792
Graves	2,432	65.94%	1,182	32.05%	60	1.63%	14	0.38%	1,250	33.89%	3,688
Grayson	1,461	48.19%	1,513	49.90%	56	1.85%	2	0.07%	-52	-1.72%	3,032
Green	1,047	46.16%	1,181	52.07%	17	0.75%	23	1.01%	-134	-5.91%	2,268
Greenup	1,236	47.58%	1,360	52.35%	2	0.08%	0	0.00%	-124	-4.77%	2,598
Hancock	900	49.70%	881	48.65%	12	0.66%	18	0.99%	19	1.05%	1,811
Hardin	2,175	59.23%	1,421	38.70%	73	1.99%	3	0.08%	754	20.53%	3,672
Harlan	211	19.81%	837	78.59%	17	1.60%	0	0.00%	-626	-58.78%	1,065
Harrison	2,133	58.86%	1,327	36.62%	164	4.53%	0	0.00%	806	22.24%	3,624
Hart	1,635	51.14%	1,506	47.11%	56	1.75%	0	0.00%	129	4.04%	3,197
Henderson	3,043	53.92%	2,413	42.75%	170	3.01%	18	0.32%	630	11.16%	5,644
Henry	1,964	59.70%	1,184	35.99%	140	4.26%	2	0.06%	780	23.71%	3,290
Hickman	1,053	69.60%	383	25.31%	60	3.97%	17	1.12%	670	44.28%	1,513
Hopkins	1,882	50.82%	1,569	42.37%	163	4.40%	89	2.40%	313	8.45%	3,703
Jackson	231	18.19%	1,019	80.24%	20	1.57%	0	0.00%	-788	-62.05%	1,270
Jefferson	17,535	57.32%	12,863	42.05%	170	0.56%	23	0.08%	4,672	15.27%	30,591
Jessamine	1,310	52.82%	1,110	44.76%	60	2.42%	0	0.00%	200	8.06%	2,480
Johnson	854	38.26%	1,357	60.80%	21	0.94%	0	0.00%	-503	-22.54%	2,232
Kenton	5,879	58.84%	3,994	39.98%	38	0.38%	80	0.80%	1,885	18.87%	9,991
Knott	468	73.93%	164	25.91%	1	0.16%	0	0.00%	304	48.03%	633
Knox	646	31.07%	1,424	68.49%	9	0.43%	0	0.00%	-778	-37.42%	2,079
Larue	1,002	57.32%	724	41.42%	22	1.26%	0	0.00%	278	15.90%	1,748
Laurel	975	40.54%	1,384	57.55%	38	1.58%	8	0.33%	-409	-17.01%	2,405
Lawrence	1,655	49.04%	1,714	50.79%	6	0.18%	0	0.00%	-59	-1.75%	3,375
Lee	432	45.57%	514	54.22%	2	0.21%	0	0.00%	-82	-8.65%	948
Leslie	66	9.09%	660	90.91%	0	0.00%	0	0.00%	-594	-81.82%	726
Letcher	281	31.15%	616	68.29%	5	0.55%	0	0.00%	-335	-37.14%	902
Lewis	1,379	41.83%	1,880	57.02%	38	1.15%	0	0.00%	-501	-15.20%	3,297
Lincoln	1,612	51.29%	1,322	42.06%	209	6.65%	0	0.00%	290	9.23%	3,143
Livingston	997	65.42%	514	33.73%	12	0.79%	1	0.07%	483	31.69%	1,524
Logan	3,010	56.77%	2,248	42.40%	18	0.34%	26	0.49%	762	14.37%	5,302
Lyon	640	51.12%	573	45.77%	38	3.04%	1	0.08%	67	5.35%	1,252
Madison	2,406	50.04%	2,343	48.73%	59	1.23%	0	0.00%	63	1.31%	4,808
Magoffin	660	43.19%	865	56.61%	2	0.13%	1	0.07%	-205	-13.42%	1,528
Marion	1,599	60.71%	1,008	38.27%	27	1.03%	0	0.00%	591	22.44%	2,634
Marshall	998	71.75%	364	26.17%	24	1.73%	5	0.36%	634	45.58%	1,391
Martin	218	29.30%	525	70.56%	1	0.13%	0	0.00%	-307	-41.26%	744
Mason	2,778	54.72%	2,265	44.61%	34	0.67%	0	0.00%	513	10.10%	5,077
McCracken	1,812	52.89%	1,535	44.80%	78	2.28%	1	0.03%	277	8.09%	3,426
McLean	972	55.13%	742	42.09%	45	2.55%	4	0.23%	230	13.05%	1,763
Meade	1,348	69.27%	593	30.47%	5	0.26%	0	0.00%	755	38.80%	1,946
Menifee	569	69.90%	229	28.13%	15	1.84%	1	0.12%	340	41.77%	814
Mercer	1,711	53.47%	1,361	42.53%	125	3.91%	3	0.09%	350	10.94%	3,200
Metcalfe	896	45.53%	1,033	52.49%	23	1.17%	16	0.81%	-137	-6.96%	1,968
Monroe	837	38.70%	1,311	60.61%	10	0.46%	5	0.23%	-474	-21.91%	2,163
Montgomery	1,531	55.31%	1,202	43.42%	35	1.26%	0	0.00%	329	11.89%	2,768
Morgan	1,342	65.95%	683	33.56%	10	0.49%	0	0.00%	659	32.38%	2,035
Muhlenberg	1,768	48.65%	1,817	50.00%	22	0.61%	27	0.74%	-49	-1.35%	3,634
Nelson	1,876	62.08%	1,102	36.47%	44	1.46%	0	0.00%	774	25.61%	3,022
Nicholas	1,475	57.82%	933	36.57%	143	5.61%	0	0.00%	542	21.25%	2,551
Ohio	2,066	49.06%	2,100	49.87%	21	0.50%	24	0.57%	-34	-0.81%	4,211
Oldham	826	61.78%	460	34.41%	46	3.44%	5	0.37%	366	27.37%	1,337
Owen	2,922	74.75%	834	21.34%	152	3.89%	1	0.03%	2,088	53.42%	3,909
Owsley	248	26.11%	699	73.58%	3	0.32%	0	0.00%	-451	-47.47%	950
Pendleton	1,945	56.92%	1,417	41.47%	55	1.61%	0	0.00%	528	15.45%	3,417
Perry	296	29.69%	699	70.11%	2	0.20%	0	0.00%	-403	-40.42%	997
Pike	1,249	49.54%	1,266	50.22%	6	0.24%	0	0.00%	-17	-0.67%	2,521
Powell	441	51.82%	403	47.36%	7	0.82%	0	0.00%	38	4.47%	851
Pulaski	1,752	36.33%	2,924	60.64%	144	2.99%	2	0.04%	-1,172	-24.31%	4,822
Robertson	657	64.35%	346	33.89%	18	1.76%	0	0.00%	311	30.46%	1,021
Rockcastle	777	41.57%	1,050	56.18%	42	2.25%	0	0.00%	-273	-14.61%	1,869
Rowan	384	48.06%	412	51.56%	3	0.38%	0	0.00%	-28	-3.50%	799
Russell	697	45.80%	804	52.83%	21	1.38%	0	0.00%	-107	-7.03%	1,522
Scott	2,037	55.14%	1,531	41.45%	126	3.41%	0	0.00%	506	13.70%	3,694
Shelby	2,219	60.18%	1,436	38.95%	21	0.57%	11	0.30%	783	21.24%	3,687
Simpson	1,525	62.42%	859	35.16%	58	2.37%	1	0.04%	666	27.26%	2,443
Spencer	998	70.08%	399	28.02%	27	1.90%	0	0.00%	599	42.06%	1,424
Taylor	1,059	55.33%	792	41.38%	63	3.29%	0	0.00%	267	13.95%	1,914
Todd	1,622	50.45%	1,555	48.37%	38	1.18%	0	0.00%	67	2.08%	3,215
Trigg	928	46.40%	978	48.90%	94	4.70%	0	0.00%	-50	-2.50%	2,000
Trimble	1,195	81.57%	247	16.86%	23	1.57%	0	0.00%	948	64.71%	1,465
Union	2,244	69.00%	955	29.37%	18	0.55%	35	1.08%	1,289	39.64%	3,252
Warren	3,587	57.15%	2,590	41.27%	98	1.56%	1	0.02%	997	15.89%	6,276
Washington	1,328	49.00%	1,365	50.37%	17	0.63%	0	0.00%	-37	-1.37%	2,710
Wayne	1,108	49.40%	1,107	49.35%	28	1.25%	0	0.00%	1	0.04%	2,243
Webster	1,626	60.58%	1,034	38.52%	16	0.60%	8	0.30%	592	22.06%	2,684
Whitley	681	23.35%	2,202	75.49%	33	1.13%	1	0.03%	-1,521	-52.14%	2,917
Wolfe	805	63.74%	444	35.15%	14	1.11%	0	0.00%	361	28.58%	1,263
Woodford	1,387	52.58%	1,217	46.13%	34	1.29%	0	0.00%	170	6.44%	2,638
Totals	183,830	53.31%	155,131	44.98%	5,223	1.51%	677	0.20%	28,699	8.32%	344,861

== See also ==
- United States presidential elections in Kentucky
