= Newfoundland, Kentucky =

Unincorporated community in Kentucky, United States

- Unincorporated community
- Location within the state of Kentucky Newfoundland (the United States)
- Coordinates: 38°7′53″N 83°5′58″W
- Country: United States
- State: Kentucky
- County: Elliott
- Elevation: 643 ft (196 m)
- Time zone: UTC-5 (EST)
  - Summer (DST): UTC-4 (EDT)
- GNIS feature ID: 508699

Newfoundland (also Crackers Neck) is an unincorporated community in Elliott County, Kentucky, United States. It lies along Routes 7 and 32 north of the city of Sandy Hook, the county seat of Elliott County. Its elevation is 643 feet (196 m).
