= Spanglin, Kentucky =

Unincorporated community in Kentucky, United States

- Unincorporated community
- Location within the state of Kentucky Spanglin (the United States)
- Coordinates: 38°3′58″N 83°13′54″W
- Country: United States
- State: Kentucky
- County: Elliott
- Elevation: 902 ft (275 m)
- Time zone: UTC-5 (Eastern (EST))
  - Summer (DST): UTC-4 (EDT)
- GNIS feature ID: 509100

Spanglin is an unincorporated community within Elliott County, Kentucky, United States. Its post office is closed.
