= Devil Fork, Kentucky =

Unincorporated community in Kentucky, United States

- Unincorporated community
- Location within the state of Kentucky Devil Fork (the United States)
- Coordinates: 38°5′12″N 83°13′40″W
- Country: United States
- State: Kentucky
- County: Elliott
- Elevation: 968 ft (295 m)
- Time zone: UTC-5 (Eastern (EST))
  - Summer (DST): UTC-4 (EDT)
- GNIS feature ID: 2337149

Devil Fork was an unincorporated community located in Elliott County, Kentucky, United States.
