= 1884 United States presidential election in Kentucky =

- November 4, 1884

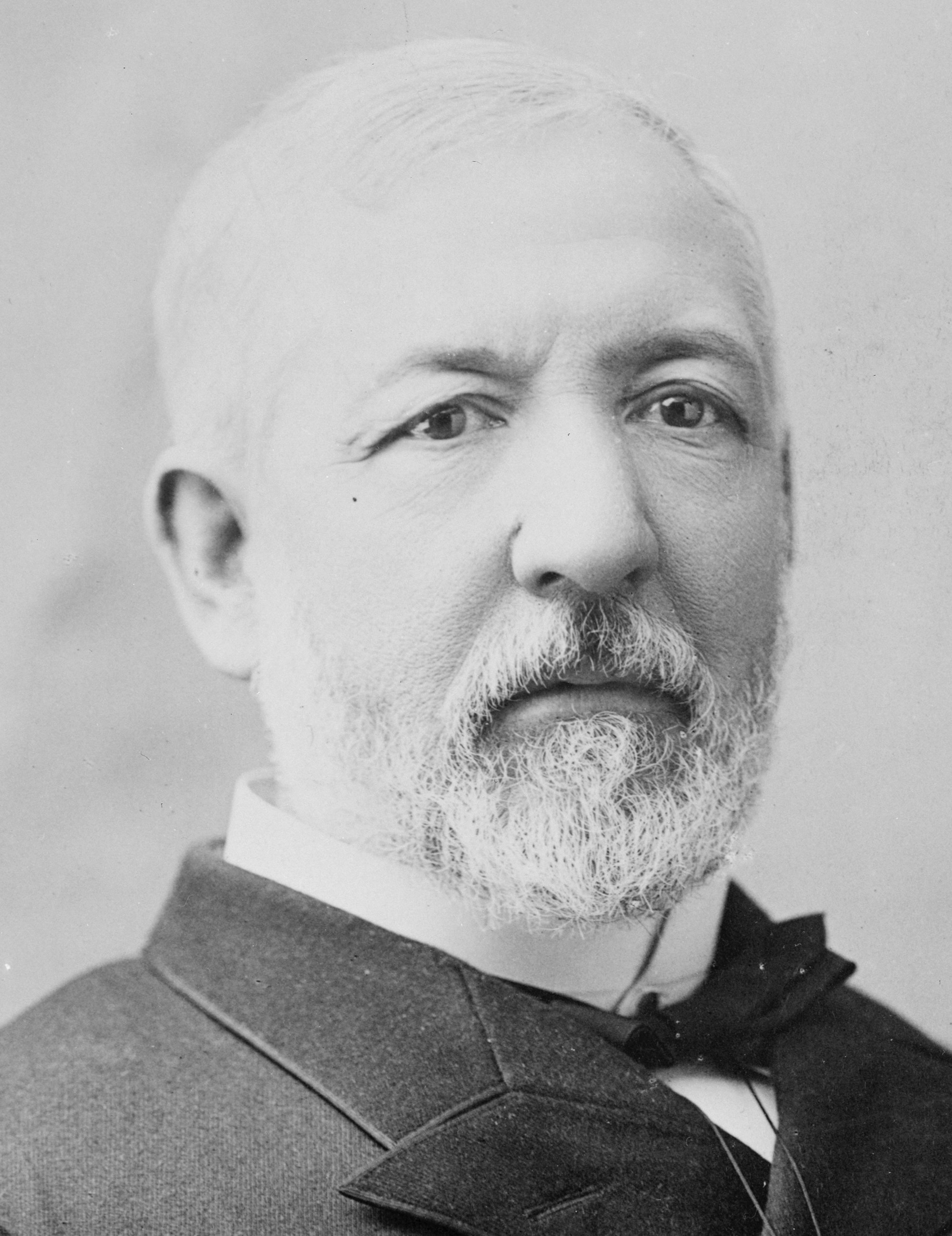
Nominee	Grover Cleveland	James G. Blaine
Party	Democratic	Republican
Home state	New York	Maine
Running mate	Thomas A. Hendricks	John A. Logan
Electoral vote	13	0
Popular vote	152,961	118,690
Percentage	55.32%	42.93%
County results
Cleveland
40–50%
50–60%
60–70%
70–80%
80–90%
Blaine
40–50%
50–60%
60–70%
70–80%
80–90%
President before election
Chester A. Arthur
Republican
Elected President
Grover Cleveland
Democratic

The 1884 United States presidential election in Kentucky took place on November 4, 1884. All contemporary thirty-eight states were part of the 1884 United States presidential election. Voters chose thirteen electors to the Electoral College, which selected the president and vice president.

Ever since the Civil War, Kentucky had been shaped politically by divisions created by that war between secessionist, Democratic counties and Unionist, Republican ones, although the state as a whole leaned Democratic throughout this era and the Republican Party would never carry the state during the Third Party System at either presidential or gubernatorial level. What would become a long-lived partisan system after the state was freed from the direct control of former Confederates would not be seriously affected by the first post-war insurgency movement – that of the Greenback Party at the tail end of the 1870s in the secessionist Jackson Purchase and other western regions. The Democratic Party would permanently lose some of the Greenback voters, especially in the Western Coal Field region, with the result that nominee Grover Cleveland lost three points on Winfield Scott Hancock’s 1880 margin.

As of the 2024 presidential election, this is the last occasion when Russell County voted for a Democratic presidential candidate.

== Results ==
1884 United States presidential election in Kentucky
Party	Candidate	Running mate	Popular vote		Electoral vote	
Party	Candidate	Running mate	Count	%	Count	%
Democratic	Grover Cleveland of New York	Thomas A. Hendricks of Indiana	152,961	55.32%	13	100.00%
Republican	James G. Blaine of Maine	John A. Logan of Illinois	118,688	42.93%	0	0.00%
Prohibition	John St. John of Kansas	William Daniel of Maryland	3,139	1.14%	0	0.00%
Greenback	Benjamin Butler of Massachusetts	Absolom Madden West of Mississippi	1,691	0.61%	0	0.00%
Total			276,479	100.00%	13	100.00%

=== Results by county ===
County	Stephen Grover Cleveland Democratic		James Gillespie Blaine Republican		Various candidates Other parties		Margin		Total votes cast
County	#	%	#	%	#	%	#	%	Total votes cast
Adair	1,059	51.43%	989	48.03%	11	0.53%	70	3.40%	2,059
Allen	1,045	57.10%	760	41.53%	25	1.37%	285	15.57%	1,830
Anderson	1,119	63.83%	612	34.91%	22	1.25%	507	28.92%	1,753
Ballard	1,886	76.11%	546	22.03%	46	1.86%	1,340	54.08%	2,478
Barren	2,084	62.62%	1,176	35.34%	68	2.04%	908	27.28%	3,328
Bath	1,260	52.50%	1,132	47.17%	8	0.33%	128	5.33%	2,400
Bell	238	30.24%	537	68.23%	12	1.52%	-299	-37.99%	787
Boone	1,694	75.22%	529	23.49%	29	1.29%	1,165	51.73%	2,252
Bourbon	1,836	50.04%	1,828	49.82%	5	0.14%	8	0.22%	3,669
Boyd	1,106	45.01%	1,335	54.33%	16	0.65%	-229	-9.32%	2,457
Boyle	1,253	49.21%	1,234	48.47%	59	2.32%	19	0.75%	2,546
Bracken	1,739	64.12%	925	34.11%	48	1.77%	814	30.01%	2,712
Breathitt	870	64.59%	459	34.08%	18	1.34%	411	30.51%	1,347
Breckinridge	1,341	52.18%	1,179	45.88%	50	1.95%	162	6.30%	2,570
Bullitt	632	66.25%	302	31.66%	20	2.10%	330	34.59%	954
Butler	761	39.59%	997	51.87%	164	8.53%	-236	-12.28%	1,922
Caldwell	1,136	56.69%	832	41.52%	36	1.80%	304	15.17%	2,004
Calloway	1,361	76.29%	354	19.84%	69	3.87%	1,007	56.45%	1,784
Campbell	3,111	47.96%	3,319	51.17%	56	0.86%	-208	-3.21%	6,486
Carroll	1,349	72.96%	434	23.47%	66	3.57%	915	49.49%	1,849
Carter	1,148	45.39%	1,353	53.50%	28	1.11%	-205	-8.11%	2,529
Casey	742	48.50%	736	48.10%	52	3.40%	6	0.39%	1,530
Christian	2,001	39.85%	2,818	56.12%	202	4.02%	-817	-16.27%	5,021
Clark	1,493	54.31%	1,244	45.25%	12	0.44%	249	9.06%	2,749
Clay	682	42.10%	931	57.47%	7	0.43%	-249	-15.37%	1,620
Clinton	269	32.93%	540	66.10%	8	0.98%	-271	-33.17%	817
Crittenden	859	46.46%	914	49.43%	76	4.11%	-55	-2.97%	1,849
Cumberland	529	43.54%	675	55.56%	11	0.91%	-146	-12.02%	1,215
Daviess	3,139	65.77%	1,571	32.91%	63	1.32%	1,568	32.85%	4,773
Edmonson	633	53.46%	545	46.03%	6	0.51%	88	7.43%	1,184
Elliott	873	76.98%	261	23.02%	0	0.00%	612	53.97%	1,134
Estill	785	51.48%	737	48.33%	3	0.20%	48	3.15%	1,525
Fayette	2,593	45.98%	3,000	53.19%	47	0.83%	-407	-7.22%	5,640
Fleming	1,677	51.46%	1,542	47.32%	40	1.23%	135	4.14%	3,259
Floyd	1,136	65.10%	608	34.84%	1	0.06%	528	30.26%	1,745
Franklin	1,819	59.44%	1,227	40.10%	14	0.46%	592	19.35%	3,060
Fulton	987	75.11%	307	23.36%	20	1.52%	680	51.75%	1,314
Gallatin	753	74.19%	254	25.02%	8	0.79%	499	49.16%	1,015
Garrard	1,009	47.46%	1,086	51.08%	31	1.46%	-77	-3.62%	2,126
Grant	1,345	61.19%	804	36.58%	49	2.23%	541	24.61%	2,198
Graves	2,754	70.60%	1,081	27.71%	66	1.69%	1,673	42.89%	3,901
Grayson	1,176	51.60%	1,030	45.20%	73	3.20%	146	6.41%	2,279
Green	682	46.17%	785	53.15%	10	0.68%	-103	-6.97%	1,477
Greenup	994	45.22%	1,192	54.23%	12	0.55%	-198	-9.01%	2,198
Hancock	656	50.50%	532	40.95%	111	8.55%	124	9.55%	1,299
Hardin	1,531	61.61%	901	36.26%	53	2.13%	630	25.35%	2,485
Harlan	217	25.03%	650	74.97%	0	0.00%	-433	-49.94%	867
Harrison	1,861	61.54%	1,120	37.04%	43	1.42%	741	24.50%	3,024
Hart	1,348	58.94%	869	38.00%	70	3.06%	479	20.94%	2,287
Henderson	2,379	53.71%	1,970	44.48%	80	1.81%	409	9.23%	4,429
Henry	1,539	59.84%	939	36.51%	94	3.65%	600	23.33%	2,572
Hickman	1,204	69.84%	489	28.36%	31	1.80%	715	41.47%	1,724
Hopkins	1,628	55.13%	1,125	38.10%	200	6.77%	503	17.03%	2,953
Jackson	280	29.26%	656	68.55%	21	2.19%	-376	-39.29%	957
Jefferson	11,266	55.23%	8,709	42.69%	424	2.08%	2,557	12.53%	20,399
Jessamine	1,134	53.72%	971	46.00%	6	0.28%	163	7.72%	2,111
Johnson	764	39.85%	1,140	59.47%	13	0.68%	-376	-19.61%	1,917
Kenton	4,489	55.70%	3,459	42.92%	111	1.38%	1,030	12.78%	8,059
Knott	453	77.57%	119	20.38%	12	2.05%	334	57.19%	584
Knox	608	39.45%	921	59.77%	12	0.78%	-313	-20.31%	1,541
Larue	860	64.81%	456	34.36%	11	0.83%	404	30.44%	1,327
Laurel	824	43.60%	1,045	55.29%	21	1.11%	-221	-11.69%	1,890
Lawrence	1,419	53.51%	1,231	46.42%	2	0.08%	188	7.09%	2,652
Lee	385	48.43%	410	51.57%	0	0.00%	-25	-3.14%	795
Leslie	76	12.79%	518	87.21%	0	0.00%	-442	-74.41%	594
Letcher	296	45.26%	357	54.59%	1	0.15%	-61	-9.33%	654
Lewis	1,152	43.02%	1,498	55.94%	28	1.05%	-346	-12.92%	2,678
Lincoln	1,377	54.51%	1,078	42.68%	71	2.81%	299	11.84%	2,526
Livingston	922	70.76%	370	28.40%	11	0.84%	552	42.36%	1,303
Logan	2,317	55.04%	1,861	44.20%	32	0.76%	456	10.83%	4,210
Lyon	748	54.28%	571	41.44%	59	4.28%	177	12.84%	1,378
Madison	2,295	51.72%	2,106	47.46%	36	0.81%	189	4.26%	4,437
Magoffin	703	46.90%	796	53.10%	0	0.00%	-93	-6.20%	1,499
Marion	1,488	60.69%	943	38.46%	21	0.86%	545	22.23%	2,452
Marshall	1,239	79.37%	295	18.90%	27	1.73%	944	60.47%	1,561
Martin	179	30.81%	402	69.19%	0	0.00%	-223	-38.38%	581
Mason	2,646	54.98%	2,120	44.05%	47	0.98%	526	10.93%	4,813
McCracken	1,992	60.88%	1,262	38.57%	18	0.55%	730	22.31%	3,272
McLean	818	60.37%	472	34.83%	65	4.80%	346	25.54%	1,355
Meade	960	69.57%	394	28.55%	26	1.88%	566	41.01%	1,380
Menifee	511	72.79%	182	25.93%	9	1.28%	329	46.87%	702
Mercer	1,496	54.84%	1,161	42.56%	71	2.60%	335	12.28%	2,728
Metcalfe	648	47.09%	681	49.49%	47	3.42%	-33	-2.40%	1,376
Monroe	541	39.60%	793	58.05%	32	2.34%	-252	-18.45%	1,366
Montgomery	1,371	55.73%	1,078	43.82%	11	0.45%	293	11.91%	2,460
Morgan	1,301	68.01%	608	31.78%	4	0.21%	693	36.23%	1,913
Muhlenberg	1,311	54.78%	1,024	42.79%	58	2.42%	287	11.99%	2,393
Nelson	1,534	62.59%	877	35.78%	40	1.63%	657	26.81%	2,451
Nicholas	1,344	59.18%	875	38.53%	52	2.29%	469	20.65%	2,271
Ohio	1,573	51.24%	1,399	45.57%	98	3.19%	174	5.67%	3,070
Oldham	677	61.77%	373	34.03%	46	4.20%	304	27.74%	1,096
Owen	2,399	79.23%	577	19.06%	52	1.72%	1,822	60.17%	3,028
Owsley	224	27.42%	588	71.97%	5	0.61%	-364	-44.55%	817
Pendleton	1,563	54.84%	1,237	43.40%	50	1.75%	326	11.44%	2,850
Perry	236	29.28%	566	70.22%	4	0.50%	-330	-40.94%	806
Pike	1,142	51.51%	1,073	48.40%	2	0.09%	69	3.11%	2,217
Powell	385	55.96%	300	43.60%	3	0.44%	85	12.35%	688
Pulaski	1,374	38.70%	2,131	60.03%	45	1.27%	-757	-21.32%	3,550
Robertson	483	65.63%	248	33.70%	5	0.68%	235	31.93%	736
Rockcastle	698	43.54%	905	56.46%	0	0.00%	-207	-12.91%	1,603
Rowan	413	47.31%	460	52.69%	0	0.00%	-47	-5.38%	873
Russell	530	51.51%	472	45.87%	27	2.62%	58	5.64%	1,029
Scott	1,789	56.19%	1,328	41.71%	67	2.10%	461	14.48%	3,184
Shelby	1,983	60.87%	1,228	37.69%	47	1.44%	755	23.17%	3,258
Simpson	1,031	60.61%	641	37.68%	29	1.70%	390	22.93%	1,701
Spencer	870	70.50%	358	29.01%	6	0.49%	512	41.49%	1,234
Taylor	832	59.43%	558	39.86%	10	0.71%	274	19.57%	1,400
Todd	1,104	51.64%	958	44.81%	76	3.55%	146	6.83%	2,138
Trigg	1,312	57.87%	896	39.52%	59	2.60%	416	18.35%	2,267
Trimble	941	81.97%	172	14.98%	35	3.05%	769	66.99%	1,148
Union	1,863	72.83%	626	24.47%	69	2.70%	1,237	48.36%	2,558
Warren	2,937	60.32%	1,866	38.32%	66	1.36%	1,071	22.00%	4,869
Washington	1,144	50.09%	1,133	49.61%	7	0.31%	11	0.48%	2,284
Wayne	775	53.37%	654	45.04%	23	1.58%	121	8.33%	1,452
Webster	1,180	61.24%	552	28.65%	195	10.12%	628	32.59%	1,927
Whitley	480	29.81%	1,106	68.70%	24	1.49%	-626	-38.88%	1,610
Wolfe	688	62.83%	403	36.80%	4	0.37%	285	26.03%	1,095
Woodford	1,267	52.33%	1,126	46.51%	28	1.16%	141	5.82%	2,421
Totals	152,961	55.32%	118,688	42.93%	4,830	1.75%	34,273	12.40%	276,479

== See also ==
- United States presidential elections in Kentucky
