= Ordinary (lecture) =

An Ordinary was a type of lecture given in universities of the Middle Ages. Lectures were distinguished by the time of day they were conducted: an ordinary was conducted by fully qualified professors on fundamental texts in the morning, while extraordinary lectures were given in the afternoon by bachelors (the medieval equivalent of a graduate student) on less important texts.
