= Lytten, Kentucky =

Unincorporated community in Kentucky, United States

- Unincorporated community
- Location within the state of Kentucky Lytten (the United States)
- Coordinates: 38°6′16″N 83°13′16″W
- Country: United States
- State: Kentucky
- County: Elliott
- Elevation: 1,155 ft (352 m)
- Time zone: UTC-5 (Eastern (EST))
  - Summer (DST): UTC-4 (EDT)
- GNIS feature ID: 508519

Lytten is an unincorporated community in Elliott County, Kentucky, United States. It lies along Route 173 west of the city of Sandy Hook, the county seat of Elliott County. Its elevation is 1,155 feet (352 m).
