= Elliott County, Kentucky =

County in Kentucky, United States

- County
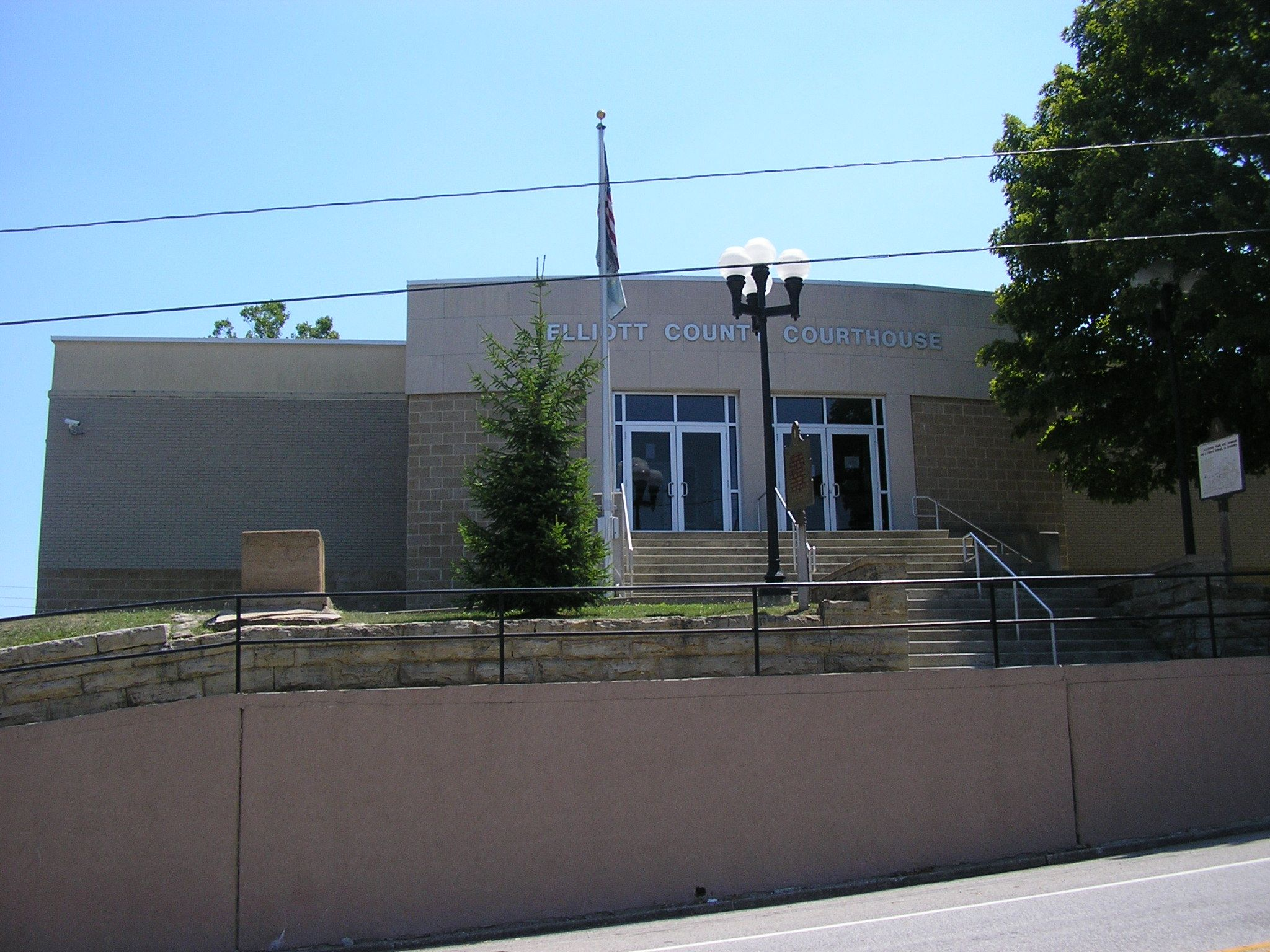
- Elliott County courthouse in Sandy Hook

- Location within the U.S. state of Kentucky
- Coordinates: 38°07′00″N 83°06′00″W
- Country: United States
- State: Kentucky
- Founded: 1869
- Named for: John Milton Elliott or John Lyle Elliot
- Seat: Sandy Hook
- Largest city: Sandy Hook

Government
  - Judge/Executive: Myron Lewis (D)

Area
  - Total: 235 sq mi (610 km^{2})
  - Land: 234 sq mi (610 km^{2})
  - Water: 1.0 sq mi (2.6 km^{2}) 0.4%

Population (2020)
  - Total: 7,354
  - Estimate (2025): 7,265 ▼
  - Density: 31.4/sq mi (12.1/km^{2})
- Time zone: UTC−5 (Eastern)
  - Summer (DST): UTC−4 (EDT)
- Congressional district: 5th
- Website: elliottcounty.ky.gov/Pages/default.aspx

Elliott County is a county located in the U.S. state of Kentucky. Its county seat is Sandy Hook. The county was formed in 1869 from parts of Morgan, Lawrence, and Carter counties, and is named for John Milton Elliott a judge, U.S. Congressman, and a member of the 1st Confederate States Congress from Kentucky; he was also involved in the formation of the Confederate government of Kentucky. Some historians, however, contend the county was named after John Milton Elliot's father, John Lyle Elliot a U.S. Congressman and Confederate Justice of the Kentucky Court of Appeals. In regard to alcohol sales, Elliott County is a dry county, meaning the sale of alcoholic beverages is prohibited everywhere in the county.

It is one of the lowest-income counties in the United States, partly due to the presence of Little Sandy Correctional Complex. From 1872 to 2016, the county always voted Democratic in presidential elections.

== History ==
Elliott County was established in 1869 from land given by Carter, Lawrence, and Morgan counties. A fire at the courthouse in 1957 resulted in the destruction of many county records.

== Geography ==
According to the U.S. Census Bureau, the county has a total area of 235 square miles (610 km^{2}), of which 234 square miles (610 km^{2}) is land and 1.0 square mile (2.6 km^{2}) (0.4%) is water.

=== Adjacent counties ===
- Carter County (north)
- Lawrence County (east)
- Morgan County (south)
- Rowan County (west)

== Demographics ==
Historical population
Census	Pop.	Note	%±
1870	4,433		—
1880	6,567		48.1%
1890	9,214		40.3%
1900	10,387		12.7%
1910	9,814		−5.5%
1920	8,887		−9.4%
1930	7,571		−14.8%
1940	8,713		15.1%
1950	7,085		−18.7%
1960	6,330		−10.7%
1970	5,933		−6.3%
1980	6,908		16.4%
1990	6,455		−6.6%
2000	6,748		4.5%
2010	7,852		16.4%
2020	7,354		−6.3%
2025 (est.)	7,265	▼	−1.2%
U.S. Decennial Census; 1790-1960 1900-1990; 1990-2000 2010-2021

=== 2020 census ===
As of the 2020 census, the county had a population of 7,354. The median age was 42.1 years. 19.7% of residents were under the age of 18 and 18.2% of residents were 65 years of age or older. For every 100 females there were 133.7 males, and for every 100 females age 18 and over there were 142.0 males age 18 and over.

The racial makeup of the county was 93.9% White, 3.3% Black or African American, 0.3% American Indian and Alaska Native, 0.2% Asian, 0.0% Native Hawaiian and Pacific Islander, 0.7% from some other race, and 1.6% from two or more races. Hispanic or Latino residents of any race comprised 1.2% of the population.

0.0% of residents lived in urban areas, while 100.0% lived in rural areas.

There were 2,511 households in the county, of which 31.5% had children under the age of 18 living with them and 24.9% had a female householder with no spouse or partner present. About 26.0% of all households were made up of individuals and 12.8% had someone living alone who was 65 years of age or older.

There were 3,022 housing units, of which 16.9% were vacant. Among occupied housing units, 76.3% were owner-occupied and 23.7% were renter-occupied. The homeowner vacancy rate was 2.9% and the rental vacancy rate was 9.7%.

=== 2000 census ===
As of the census of 2000, there were 6,748 people, 2,638 households, and 1,925 families residing in the county. The population density was 29 per square mile (11/km^{2}). There were 3,107 housing units at an average density of 13 per square mile (5.0/km^{2}). The racial makeup of the county was 99.04% White, 0.03% Black or African American, 0.07% Native American, 0.01% Pacific Islander, 0.01% from other races, and 0.83% from two or more races. 0.59% of the population were Hispanic or Latino of any race.

There were 2,638 households, of which 33.40% had children under the age of 18 living with them, 60.00% were married couples living together, 9.70% had a female householder with no husband present, and 27.00% were non-families. 24.70% of all households were made up of individuals, and 11.00% had someone living alone who was 65 years of age or older. The average household size was 2.54 and the average family size was 3.02.

People of British ancestry form an overwhelming plurality in Elliott County.

In the county, the population was spread out, with 25.40% under the age of 18, 9.10% from 18 to 24, 27.50% from 25 to 44, 24.70% from 45 to 64, and 13.40% who were 65 years of age or older. The median age was 37 years. For every 100 females there were 95.20 males. For every 100 females age 18 and over, there were 93.50 males.

The median income for a household in the county was $21,014, and the median income for a family was $27,125. Males had a median income of $29,593 versus $20,339 for females. The per capita income for the county was $12,067. About 20.80% of families and 25.90% of the population were below the poverty line, including 30.50% of those under age 18 and 26.40% of those age 65 or over.

== Politics ==
United States presidential election results for Elliott County, Kentucky
Year	Republican		Democratic		Third party(ies)	
Year	No.	%	No.	%	No.	%
1872	124	24.51%	382	75.49%	0	0.00%
1876	141	16.02%	739	83.98%	0	0.00%
1880	115	14.45%	623	78.27%	58	7.29%
1884	261	23.02%	873	76.98%	0	0.00%
1888	426	28.03%	1,090	71.71%	4	0.26%
1892	453	28.85%	1,079	68.73%	38	2.42%
1896	577	30.56%	1,294	68.54%	17	0.90%
1900	624	31.28%	1,367	68.52%	4	0.20%
1904	594	34.02%	1,143	65.46%	9	0.52%
1908	618	34.62%	1,159	64.93%	8	0.45%
1912	396	25.70%	1,006	65.28%	139	9.02%
1916	525	31.12%	1,151	68.23%	11	0.65%
1920	860	32.61%	1,764	66.89%	13	0.49%
1924	614	26.16%	1,702	72.52%	31	1.32%
1928	601	31.33%	1,317	68.67%	0	0.00%
1932	382	15.09%	2,150	84.91%	0	0.00%
1936	480	23.77%	1,539	76.23%	0	0.00%
1940	634	23.95%	2,013	76.05%	0	0.00%
1944	514	23.00%	1,721	77.00%	0	0.00%
1948	410	16.28%	2,095	83.17%	14	0.56%
1952	629	23.27%	2,074	76.73%	0	0.00%
1956	1,033	32.53%	2,143	67.47%	0	0.00%
1960	789	31.27%	1,734	68.73%	0	0.00%
1964	323	13.74%	2,026	86.18%	2	0.09%
1968	515	23.56%	1,387	63.45%	284	12.99%
1972	782	34.04%	1,499	65.26%	16	0.70%
1976	455	18.49%	1,987	80.74%	19	0.77%
1980	551	24.59%	1,668	74.43%	22	0.98%
1984	601	26.20%	1,683	73.37%	10	0.44%
1988	550	23.33%	1,797	76.24%	10	0.42%
1992	444	17.58%	1,796	71.13%	285	11.29%
1996	421	20.89%	1,298	64.42%	296	14.69%
2000	827	34.73%	1,525	64.05%	29	1.22%
2004	871	29.46%	2,064	69.80%	22	0.74%
2008	902	35.86%	1,535	61.03%	78	3.10%
2012	1,126	46.94%	1,186	49.44%	87	3.63%
2016	2,000	70.05%	740	25.92%	115	4.03%
2020	2,246	74.99%	712	23.77%	37	1.24%
2024	2,335	80.13%	532	18.26%	47	1.61%

Elliott County had voted for the Democratic Party's nominee in every presidential election since the county was formed in 1869, up until the 2016 presidential election. This was the longest streak of any county voting Democratic in the United States. It was also the last majority-White Southern rural county never to have voted for a Republican in any presidential election until 2016. As of 2024, Donald Trump remains the only Republican to have ever won Elliott County in presidential elections.

According to interviews from residents of the county, this overwhelming Democratic support was primarily due to long-standing tradition to vote Democratic passed down through generations, as well as an appreciation for big government following FDR's New Deal. The county is one of the lowest-income in the country, as part of the Eastern Kentucky Coalfield. As of 2024, the county has a median household income of $46,000 and a 25% poverty rate.

Even in nationwide Republican landslides like 1972 and 1984, when Republican candidates won the state of Kentucky overall with over 60% of the vote, Elliott County voted 65.3% and 73.4% Democratic, respectively. Reagan, in particular, only performed 3% better in the county in 1984 than 1936 GOP nominee Alf Landon, despite the fact that Reagan won everywhere but Minnesota and Washington, D.C., and a national popular vote swing of 41%, while Landon lost every state but Maine and Vermont.

It was Democrat John Kerry's strongest county in Kentucky in 2004. With white Americans making up 99.04% of its population, Elliott County was the second-whitest in the country to vote for Democrat Barack Obama in 2008, the whitest being Mitchell County, Iowa. Obama garnered 61.0% of the vote, while Republican John McCain received 35.9%. In fact, Elliott County provided Obama with the highest percentage of the vote in all of Kentucky, although this was nonetheless the worst Democratic performance in the county since its founding. The county shifted 15% rightward from 2004 to 2008, despite Obama improving by 4% in Kentucky.

Obama would again win the county in 2012, his only such victory in the conservative region of rural Eastern Kentucky. However, he slipped out only a narrow 49.4% plurality over Mitt Romney's 46.9%, thus ending an over century-long streak of Democratic landslides in Elliott County. Reflecting the increasing rural–urban divide of modern American politics, Obama's strongest county in the state was instead Jefferson County, home to Louisville—the most populous city in Kentucky—which he won by a comfortable 54.7–43.6% margin.

Obama never carried Kentucky in either of his runs, due to rural counties like Elliott shifting hard towards Republicans. The county’s political history is similar to some counties in nearby West Virginia, such as McDowell County, that were consistently Democratic until the 2010s. West Virginia itself was reliably Democratic until the 21st century, after which it became a Republican stronghold in the 2010s. Meanwhile, Virginia has become a reliably blue state, while Kentucky and West Virginia have become red states.

The county is part of the Bible Belt, and according to interviews in 2013, residents were socially conservative on issues such as abortion and LGBT rights. In 2022, Elliott County voted for Kentucky Amendment 2, which would have explicitly removed a constitutional right to abortion, by a 347-vote (roughly 17.91%) margin, with 1,142 "yes" votes (roughly 59%) and 795 "no" votes (roughly 41.04%) - indicating continued anti-abortion sentiment in Elliott County into the early 2020s, although not by the landslide 20%+ margins seen in many rural counties further south in Kentucky closer to Tennessee.

In 2013, most Elliott County residents believed that Hillary Clinton would easily carry the county if she ran in 2016, even though a more liberal Democrat might lose the county. Instead, Elliott County's hard swing towards the Republican Party continued in 2016, when it voted for Republican Trump over Clinton by a 70.1–25.9% margin, decisively ending the Democratic Party's 140-year victory streak. Trump received about 900 more votes in the county, nearly twice the number of voters that Romney won. In contrast, Clinton received about 400 fewer votes than Obama. Despite Trump's victory, Democratic candidates for concurrent downballot offices managed to carry the county. In the Senate race, Democratic nominee Jim Gray won 56.0% of the county's vote to Republican Senator Rand Paul's 44.0%. In addition, Democratic State Rep. Rocky Adkins, a Sandy Hook native whose state house district includes the entire county, was reelected and took 86% of the vote in Elliott.

Trump won the county again in 2020 with a larger 75% of the vote. Joe Biden became the first Democrat to win the presidency without carrying the county since its creation in 1869. By 2024, Trump managed to make Elliott an even deeper shade of red, getting 80% of the vote, a figure that once was more commonly associated with fiercely Unionist Kentucky counties like Jackson and Clay.

Overall, Elliott County shifted to the right from 2012 to 2024 by 64 percentage points, representing one of the strongest such rightward shifts for any county in the country. The county had the largest shift to the right of any county outside of Texas. The county went from giving Democrats 70% of the vote in 2004 to 18% in 2024, despite Democrats winning 48.3% of the national popular vote in both years.

Elliott was one of two counties in Kentucky (the other being nearby Wolfe County) that had voted against Senator Mitch McConnell in all of his elections, though this streak would also come to an end in 2020. It also had never voted for Representative Hal Rogers in any of his contested elections until 2018, when he won 54.5% of the county's vote over Democratic nominee Kenneth Stepp. Until the 2020s, the county remained reliably Democratic in state-level races, voting for the party's entire slate in the 2015 and 2019 statewide elections. However, in 2023, the county voted Republican in every state-level election on the ballot except for the governor.

Despite this, Democratic Governor Andy Beshear's vote share still decreased in Elliott County, from 59.27% in 2019 to 53.48% in 2023, despite him winning by a higher margin statewide compared to 2019 four years earlier. This continued the Democratic gubernatorial streak of winning this county since the establishment of the county. Since then, the county has voted for Democratic gubernatorial candidates starting in 1871.

=== Elected officials ===
==== State and federal ====
Elected officials as of January 3, 2025
U.S. House	Hal Rogers (R)	KY 5
Ky. Senate	Phillip Wheeler (R)	31
Ky. House	Richard White (R)	99

==== County ====
Elected officials as of January 2, 2023
Judge/Executive	Myron Lewis (D)
Magistrate District 1	Emily Adkins (D)
Magistrate District 2	Michael Dickerson (R)
Magistrate District 3	Charles Whitt (R)
Magistrate District 4	Brian Dillon (D)
Magistrate District 5	Chris Dickerson (R)
Magistrate District 6	Dewey Smith (D)
Magistrate District 7	Darren Newell (D)
Property Value Admin.	Adam Ison (D)
Attorney	John D. Lewis Jr. (D)
Clerk	Jennifer R. Carter (D)
Sheriff	Ray Craft (D)
Jailer	Dustin Kelley (D)
Coroner	Mark Lewis (D)

==== Judicial ====
Elected officials as of January 6, 2025
Commonwealth's Attorney	Brandon Ison (D)
Circuit Court Clerk	William Jason Ison (D)
37th Circuit, 1st division	Rebecca K. Phillips
37th Circuit, 2nd division family court	Jeniffer Barker Neice
37th District	Rupert Wilhoit

=== Voter registration ===
On Election Day 2012, Elliott County had the lowest percentage of registered Republicans in Kentucky, with just 215 of 5,012 (4.2%) registered voters affiliating with the GOP. By October 2016, this proportion had increased to 429 out of 5,213 (8.2%). In April 2019, it stood at 562 of 5,318 (10.6%). By June 2022, this share had nearly doubled, with 1,007 registered Republicans out of 5,243 registered voters (19.2%). By May 2024, 1136 out of 4947 (23%) of the county's voters were registered Republicans.

On July 1, 2025, the county had 4,748 registered voters, who were registered with the following parties.

Party	Registration	
Party	Voters	%
Democratic	3,231	68.05
Republican	1,205	25.38
Independent	130	2.74
Libertarian	16	0.34
Constitution	5	0.11
Green	1	0.02
Reform	1	0.02
Socialist Workers	0	0.00
"Other"	159	3.35
Total	4,748	100.00
Source: Kentucky State Board of Elections

== Communities ==
=== City ===
- Sandy Hook (county seat)

=== Unincorporated communities ===
- Ault
- Bascom
- Beartown
- Bell City
- Bigstone
- Blaines Trace
- Bruin
- Brushy Fork
- Burke
- Clay Fork
- Cliffside
- Culver
- Devil Fork
- Dewdrop
- Dobbins
- Edsel
- Eldridge
- Fannin
- Fannin Valley
- Faye
- Fielden
- Forks of Newcombe
- Gimlet
- Gomez
- Green
- Halcom
- Ibex
- Isonville
- Little Fork
- Little Sandy
- Lytten
- Middle Fork
- Neil Howard's Creek
- Newcombe
- Newfoundland
- Ordinary
- Roscoe
- Shady Grove
- Sarah
- Sideway
- Spanglin
- Stark
- Stephens
- The Ridge
- Wells Creek
- Wyatt

== See also ==
- National Register of Historic Places listings in Elliott County, Kentucky
