= Sandy Hook, Kentucky =

- City
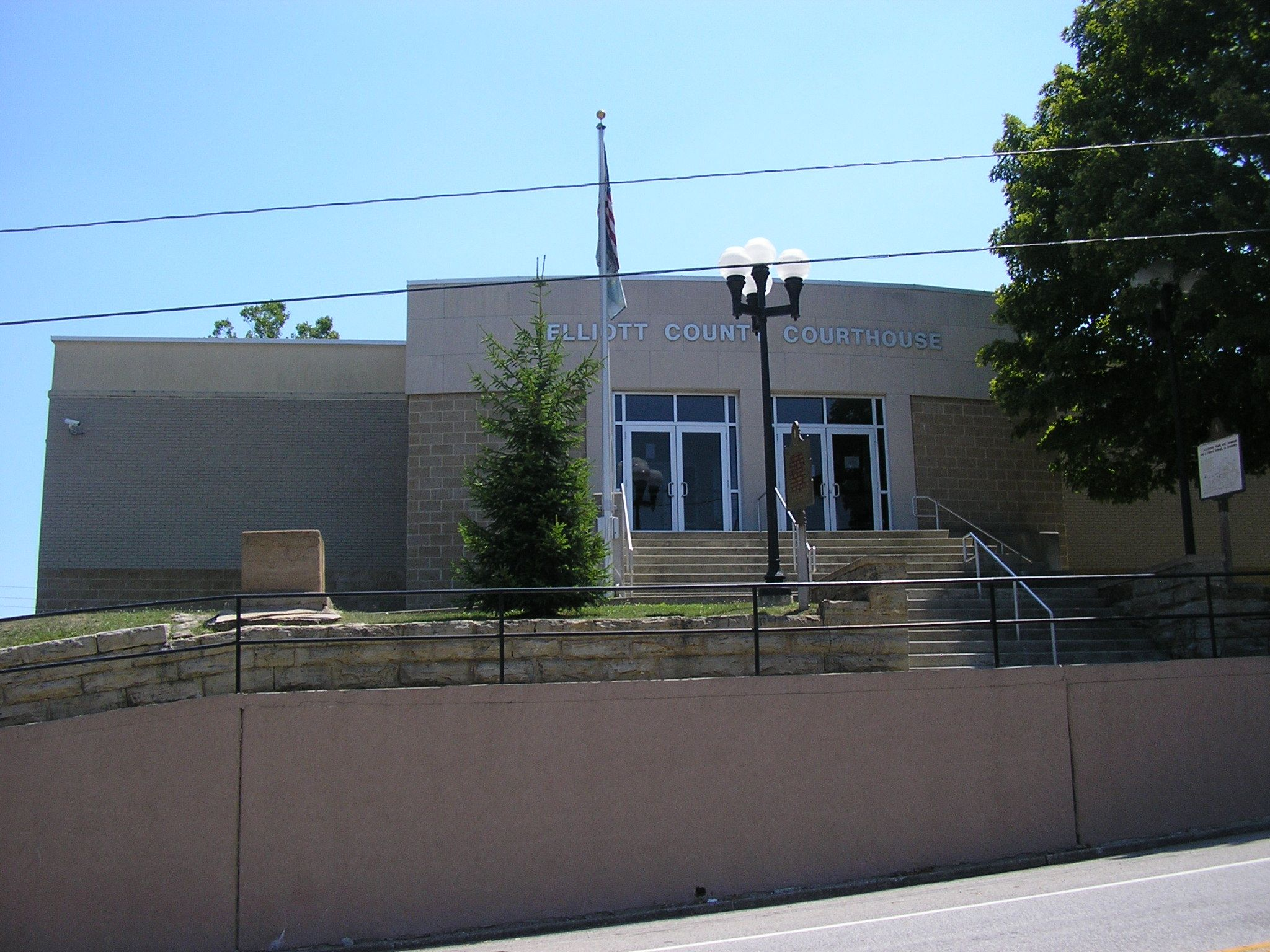
- Elliott County courthouse in Sandy Hook

- Location of Sandy Hook in Elliott County, Kentucky.
- Coordinates: 38°05′19″N 83°07′44″W
- Country: United States
- State: Kentucky
- County: Elliott
- Established: March 4, 1850
- Incorporated: 1872
- Reincorporated: April 13, 1888
- Reactivated: 1930
- Reactivated: 1968

Government
  - Type: Mayor-Council
  - Mayor: James Robby Adkins

Area
  - Total: 0.98 sq mi (2.55 km^{2})
  - Land: 0.98 sq mi (2.54 km^{2})
  - Water: 0 sq mi (0.00 km^{2})
- Elevation: 804 ft (245 m)

Population (2020)
  - Total: 641
  - Density: 652.8/sq mi (252.03/km^{2})
- Time zone: UTC-5 (Eastern (EST))
  - Summer (DST): UTC-4 (EDT)
- ZIP code: 41171
- Area code: 606
- FIPS code: 21-68556
- GNIS feature ID: 2405416

Sandy Hook is a home rule-class city beside the Little Sandy River in Elliott County, Kentucky, in the United States. As of the 2020 census, Sandy Hook had a population of 641.

Sandy Hook is the county seat of Elliott County, which is a dry county. It is illegal to sell alcohol within the city. The Little Sandy Correctional Complex, a medium-security prison operated by the Kentucky Department of Corrections, is located 6 miles (10 km) northeast of Sandy Hook.

== History ==
The head of navigation on the Little Sandy River was first settled in the 1820s. By the time of its establishment by the state legislature in 1850, it was known as "Sandy Hook" for the fishhook-shaped bend in the river at that point.

It was chosen as the seat of the newly established Elliott County over nearby Newfoundland in 1869, owing to a generous donation of land for public buildings by resident James Hunter. In 1872, the city was incorporated as "Martinsburg" in honor of Congressman John P. Martin. The priority of another Martinsburg, Kentucky, meant that the post office (established 1874) had to be named "Sandy Hook". The city resumed the name shortly after and was reincorporated as "Sandy Hook" in 1888.

== Geography ==
Sandy Hook is located near the center of Elliott County at the head of navigation on the Little Sandy River in eastern Kentucky. According to the United States Census Bureau, the city has a total area of 0.97 square miles (2.5 km^{2}), all land.

Kentucky Route 7 passes through the center of town, leading northeast 22 miles (35 km) to Grayson and southwest 18 miles (29 km) to West Liberty. Kentucky Route 32 leads east 39 miles (63 km) to Louisa and heads north out of Sandy Hook with KY 7, eventually leading northwest 27 miles (43 km) to Morehead.

== Demographics ==
Historical population
Census	Pop.	Note	%±
1870	62		—
1880	83		33.9%
1890	151		81.9%
1900	148		−2.0%
1910	160		8.1%
1920	115		−28.1%
1930	155		34.8%
1940	184		18.7%
1950	238		29.3%
1960	195		−18.1%
1970	561		187.7%
1980	627		11.8%
1990	548		−12.6%
2000	678		23.7%
2010	675		−0.4%
2020	641		−5.0%
U.S. Decennial Census

As of the census of 2000, there were 678 people, 292 households, and 167 families residing in the city. The population density was 716.1 inhabitants per square mile (276.5/km^{2}). There were 332 housing units at an average density of 350.7 per square mile (135.4/km^{2}). The racial makeup of the city was 99.26% White, 0.15% African American, 0.15% Native American, and 0.44% from two or more races.

There were 292 households, out of which 27.1% had children under the age of 18 living with them, 36.0% were married couples living together, 18.8% had a female householder with no husband present, and 42.8% were non-families. 41.8% of all households were made up of individuals, and 18.5% had someone living alone who was 65 years of age or older. The average household size was 2.13 and the average family size was 2.90.

In the city, the population was spread out, with 23.5% under the age of 18, 8.4% from 18 to 24, 22.1% from 25 to 44, 20.8% from 45 to 64, and 25.2% who were 65 years of age or older. The median age was 42 years. For every 100 females, there were 65.0 males. For every 100 females age 18 and over, there were 60.2 males.

The median income for a household in the city was $14,313, and the median income for a family was $21,071. Males had a median income of $40,417 versus $22,031 for females. The per capita income for the city was $13,278. About 28.2% of families and 31.2% of the population were below the poverty line, including 43.1% of those under age 18 and 26.4% of those age 65 or over.

== Education ==
Sandy Hook has a lending library, the Rocky J. Adkins Public Library, named after Rocky Adkins.

== Notable person ==
Sandy Hook is the hometown of late country music singer Keith Whitley. A statue of Whitley playing his guitar can be seen in the local cemetery, and a local street was renamed "Keith Whitley Boulevard."
