= AA Highway =

State highway in Kentucky, United States

John Y. Brown Jr. AA Highway
- Alexandria to Ashland Highway
- AA Highway highlighted in red, including spurs

Route information
- Maintained by KYTC

Mainline (KY 9)
- Length: 84.727 mi (136.355 km)
- South end: AA Hwy / KY 9 / KY 10 near Vanceburg
- Major intersections: KY 10 near Tollesboro; US 62 / KY 10 in Maysville; US 68 in Maysville; KY 10 near Germantown; US 27 in Cold Spring
- North end: I-275 / KY 9 in Wilder

Southern Spur (KY 9)
- Length: 26.310 mi (42.342 km)
- South end: KY 1 / KY 7 to I-64 in Grayson
- North end: AA Hwy / KY 9 / KY 10 near Vanceburg

Eastern Spur (KY 10)
- Length: 24.628 mi (39.635 km)
- West end: AA Hwy / KY 9 / KY 10 near Vanceburg
- East end: US 23 / KY 10 near Greenup

Location
- Country: United States
- State: Kentucky
- Counties: Greenup, Carter, Lewis, Mason, Bracken, Pendleton, Campbell

Highway system
- Kentucky State Highway System; Interstate; US; State; Parkways

The AA Highway is a 135.665-mile-long (218.332 km) state highway maintained by the Kentucky Transportation Cabinet (KYTC) in the U.S. state of Kentucky. The mainline route parallels the Ohio River from Interstate 275 (I-275) in Wilder to Vanceburg; it is cosigned as Kentucky Route (KY 9). From Vanceburg, the highway splits into two routes, with the southern spur using the KY 9 designation and continuing to Grayson and I-64, and the eastern spur using the designation of KY 10 and continuing to Greenup. The AA is mostly a two-lane rural highway that provides the only direct connection between Ashland and Northern Kentucky, which includes Cincinnati.

The route name is a contraction of its earlier name of the Alexandria to Ashland Highway, which referenced two cities connected by the highway: Alexandria in Northern Kentucky and (via I-64) Ashland in Eastern Kentucky. The route is officially known as the John Y. Brown Jr. AA Highway, named for a Kentucky politician and entrepreneur.

While the highway passes through terrain that is rolling to hilly, the highway is generally level with moderate grades and no steep grades. Except for Carter County, all counties that the AA Highway passes through border the Ohio River. While the AA Highway is not an expressway, it nonetheless serves as the shortest highway link between Cincinnati and Ashland. As such, it provides a link between Cincinnati and other Midwestern cities such as Chicago, Indianapolis, and Dayton and cities south and east of Ashland such as Huntington and Charleston in West Virginia, Charlottesville and Richmond in Virginia, and Charlotte and Winston-Salem in North Carolina.

The only municipalities on the highway are Vanceburg and Maysville, along with suburban areas of Cincinnati at its western terminus. Those areas are also the only areas with any services used by motorists such as motels, gas stations, restaurants, convenience stores, etc. There are no rest areas on the AA Highway. Other than the portions that traverse the edge of Maysville and enter suburban Cincinnati, there are no shopping centers or major retail stores along the AA Highway.

The AA Highway is a rural two-lane highway for most of its length and traverses through some desolate terrain. Driver inattention and speeding, in combination with the numerous side road entrances and at-grade intersections have made it a dangerous and deadly road. To address these issues, guide signs comparable to interstate-styled signs have been installed along the highway at major intersections, along with additional overhead lighting. Other measures to improve safety and increase capacity are under consideration.

== Route description ==
The AA Highway follows a general northwest–southeast orientation. It begins at an interchange with I-275 in Wilder in Campbell County and is designated as KY 9–AA Highway. The route then passes the outskirts of its namesake Alexandria. Within Campbell County, the road is a four-lane arterial highway. Note that the KY 9 route begins about five miles (8.0 km) north in Newport before it is designated as the AA.

The next segment passes through a remote, hilly region where the road is generally three lanes, with a passing lane present at uphill grades.

A few miles west of Maysville, the highway runs concurrently with KY 10, and the road becomes an arterial highway again. The concurrency ends within Maysville, and upon passing out of the city, the road becomes a two-lane rural highway through an agricultural region.

KY 9 then crosses the Allegheny Escarpment into the Appalachian Mountains at the same time that another concurrency with KY 10 begins. The remainder of KY 9 passes through mountainous terrain and is generally two lanes with periodic passing lanes. After passing through Vanceburg, the AA Highway follows two routes. The first follows KY 9, which turns southeasterly away from the Ohio River and towards Grayson. The KY 9-AA Highway ends at an intersection with KY 1 and KY 7, which provides a short connection to I-64 and access to Ashland.

The second route follows KY 10, which continues to parallel the Ohio River. The AA Highway designation of KY 10 terminates at US Route 23 (US 23), which provides connections to Greenup and Ashland. The KY 10 route continues without the AA designation for about 1.2 miles (1.9 km) before terminating at the Ohio border on the Jesse Stuart Memorial Bridge.

== History ==
The AA Highway was envisioned as a modern highway from Alexandria to Ashland. Construction began in 1985 on the first segment of the AA Highway. Estimated to cost $266 million (equivalent to $657 million in 2024) to complete, it was designed primarily as a two-lane controlled-access facility. The first phase included the construction of 86 miles (138 km) of the AA Highway from the junction of I-275 and Licking Pike (existing KY 9) in Campbell County east to Vanceburg. The first phase also included the design of two 25-mile-long (40 km) spurs running east from Vanceburg, one ending at US 23 near Lloyd and the Jesse Stuart Memorial Bridge, the other ending near I-64 in Grayson.

When construction began, the costs for the first phase had risen to $292.7 million; the state had sold $300 million in bonds to pay for it. Segments of the highway, from Clarksburg just west of Vanceburg to Tollesboro was routed on an earlier relocated alignment of KY 10.

It officially opened in 1995; however, it was not formally dedicated until 2003.

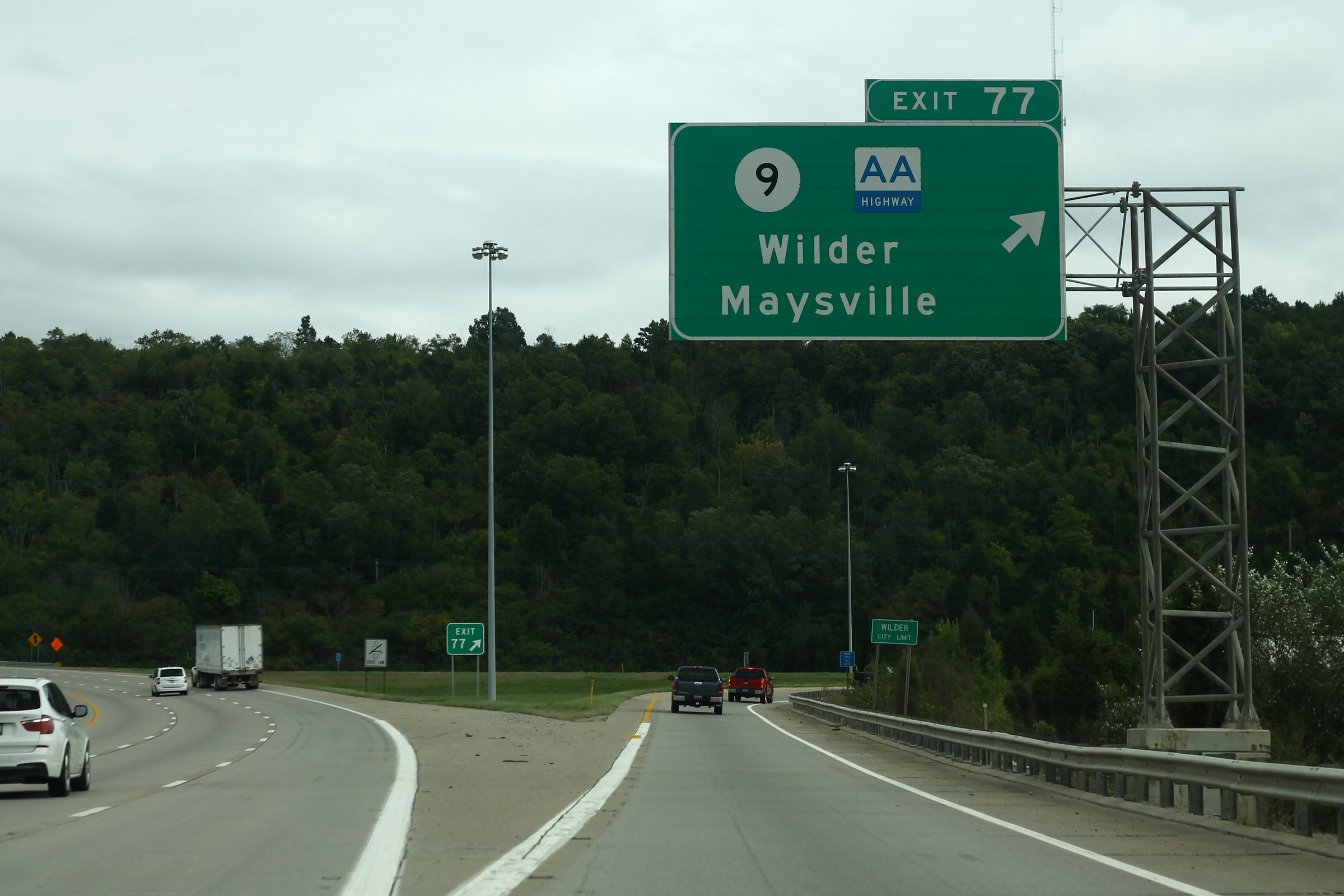
Signage for exit 77 on I-275; northern terminus of AA Highway

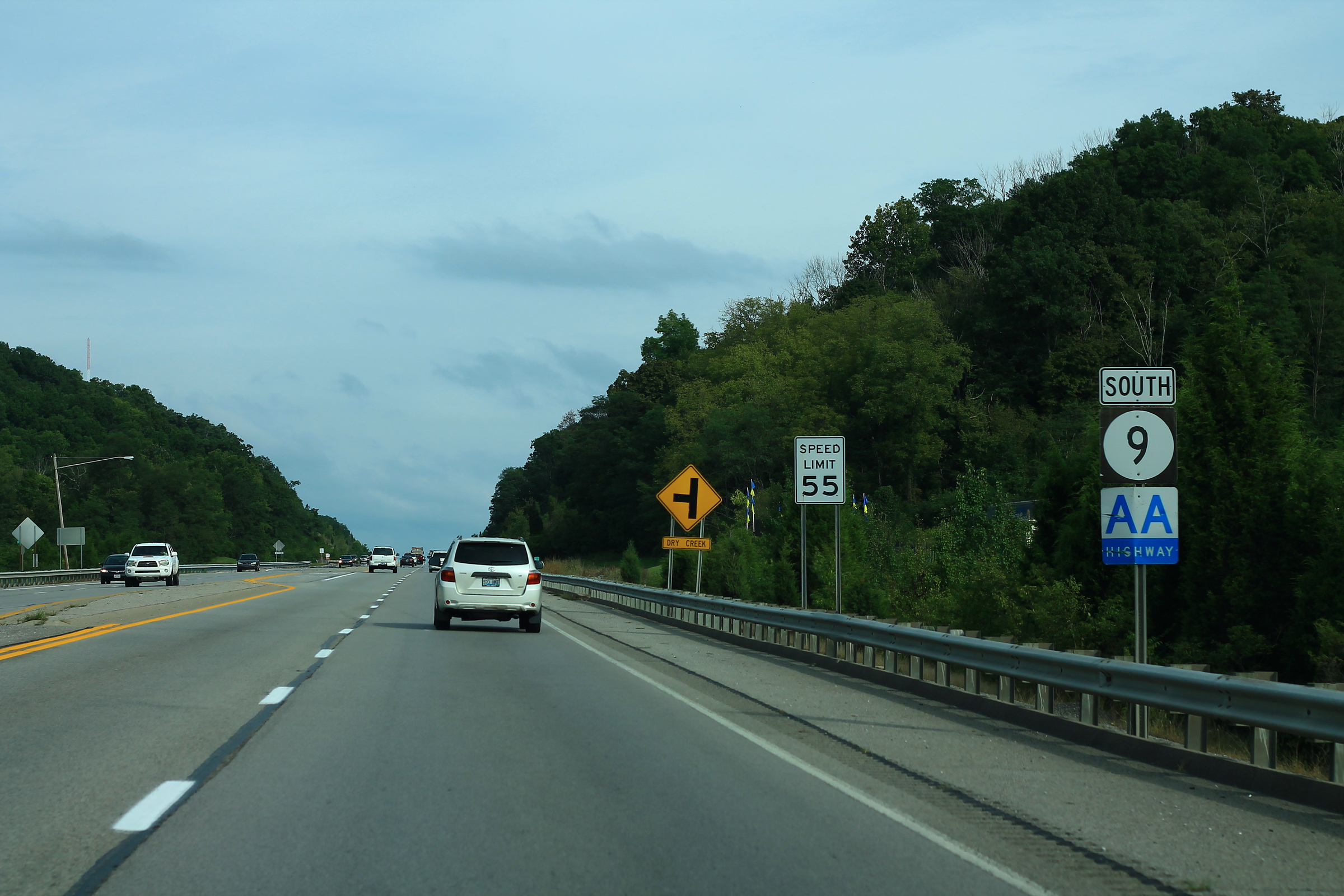
AA Highway in Cold Spring

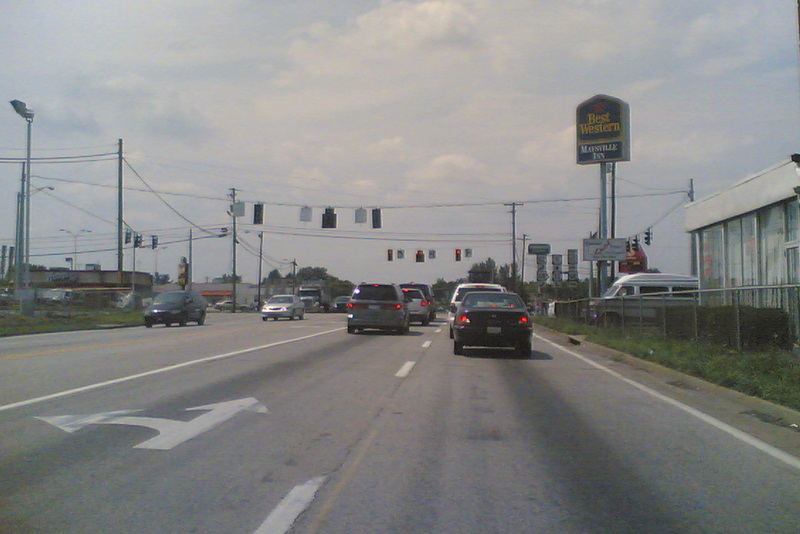
AA Highway in Maysville

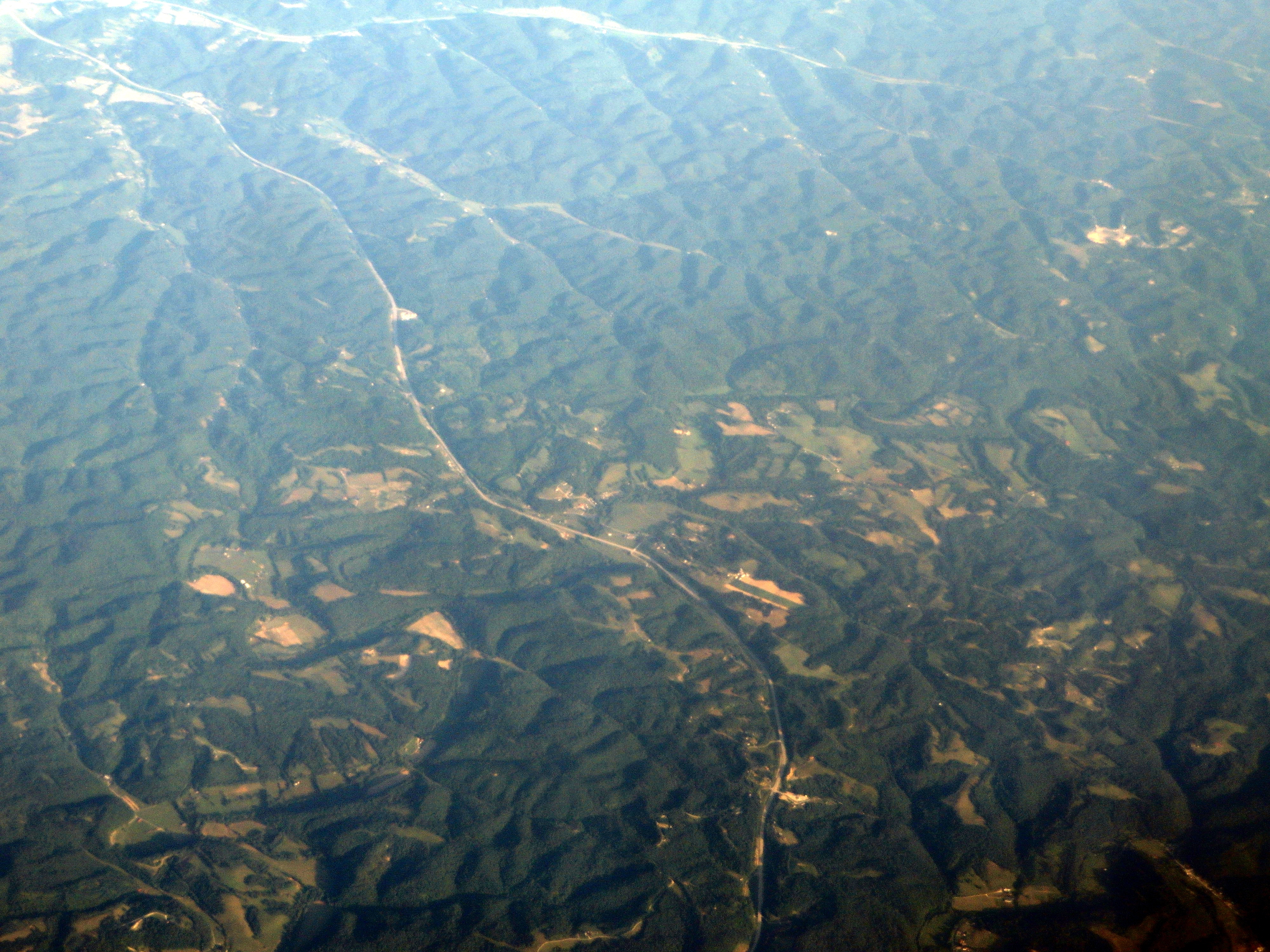
Aerial view of the AA Highway southern spur in Carter County

=== Numbering changes ===
The AA Highway including the Greenup spur was originally designated as KY 546, and the Grayson spur was signed as KY 694. On May 26, 1988, the designation, "AA Highway", was proposed to be signed along with KY 546 and KY 694. A few years later, this designation was put in place with the AA Highway being co-signed with KY 546 and KY 694, however, many motorists were soon confused by the ever-changing designations.

To solve this issue, the AA Highway was renumbered in late 1995. The AA Highway including the Grayson spur was renumbered KY 9, and the Greenup spur was renumbered as KY 10. KY 10 also overlaps portions of the AA Highway throughout the entire highway's existence. Old KY 9 in Campbell County was renumbered as KY 915, and old KY 10 between Vanceburg and South Portsmouth was redesignated as KY 8.

== Major intersections ==
=== Mainline AA Highway ===
County	Location	mi	km	Destinations	Notes
Lewis		26.310	42.342	AA Hwy (KY 9) south / KY 1149 south to I-64 – Grayson AA Hwy (KY 10) east – South Shore, Greenup, Ashland	Southern terminus of AA Highway mainline; AA Highway continues as southern spur designated KY 9 and eastern spur designated KY 10
Lewis		27.265	43.879	KY 1149 north	Northern end of KY 1149 concurrency
Lewis	Vanceburg	29.467	47.423	KY 59 – Olive Hill, Vanceburg	
Lewis		31.011	49.907	KY 2523 north	Southern terminus of KY 2523
Lewis	Clarksburg	32.827	52.830	KY 3037 north	Southern terminus of KY 3037
Lewis	Charters	36.815	59.248	KY 989 south	Northern terminus of KY 989
Lewis	Ribolt	42.518	68.426	KY 10 west	Northern end of KY 10 concurrency
Lewis		46.642	75.063	KY 57 – Flemingsburg, Tollesboro	
Mason		49.685	79.960	KY 1234 east	Southern end of KY 1234 concurrency
Mason		50.078	80.593	KY 1237	
Mason		50.222	80.824	KY 1234 west	Northern end of KY 1234 concurrency
Mason		50.979	82.043	KY 3161 north	Southern terminus of KY 3161
Mason		53.261	85.715	KY 1449 – Orangeburg	
Mason		55.955	90.051	KY 3313	
Mason		56.832	91.462	KY 1448 east	Southern end of KY 1448 concurrency
Mason	Maysville	57.040	91.797	KY 11 / KY 1448 west – Flemingsburg, Maysville	Northern end of KY 1448 concurrency
Mason	Maysville	58.451	94.068	KY 1448	
Mason	Maysville	59.736	96.136	US 62 / KY 10 – Lexington, Maysville	Southern end of KY 10 concurrency
Mason	Maysville	61.875	99.578	US 68 – Lexington, Aberdeen, OH, Ripley, OH	Interchange
Mason		65.378	105.216	KY 3056 east	Western terminus of KY 3056
Mason		65.606	105.583	KY 10 west – Germantown	Northern end of KY 10 concurrency
Mason		66.545	107.094	KY 435 – Minerva	
Bracken		72.799	117.159	KY 2370 (Dutch Ridge Road)	
Bracken		74.567	120.004	KY 19 – Brooksville, Augusta, Mount Olivet, Augusta Historic District	
Bracken		76.772	123.553	KY 875 – Chatham, Gertrude	
Bracken	Woolcott	79.280	127.589	KY 1159 – Brooksville, Mount Olivet	
Bracken		82.606	132.941	KY 1109 – Bradford, Johnsville	
Bracken	Foster	85.877	138.206	KY 1019 – Lenoxburg, Foster	
Bracken	Foster	87.830	141.349	KY 2228 east to KY 8 – Foster	Western terminus of KY 2228
Pendleton		89.174	143.512	KY 159 south – Kincaid Lake State Park	Northern terminus of KY 159
Pendleton		91.711	147.595	KY 154 to KY 8 – Peach Grove	
Campbell		93.717	150.823	KY 2828 east (Ivor Road) – Carntown	Western terminus of KY 2828
Campbell	Flagg Spring	94.941	152.793	KY 735 to KY 10 – Mentor	
Campbell		99.316	159.834	KY 1996 (Carthage Road)	
Campbell		101.238	162.927	KY 1997 to KY 10 / KY 547	
Campbell		103.405	166.414	KY 547 – Alexandria, Silver Grove	Interchange
Campbell		105.348	169.541	KY 709 west (East Alexandria Pike)	
Campbell	Cold Spring	107.148	172.438	US 27	Interchange (exit 14)
Campbell	Cold Spring	109.337	175.961	KY 915 south (Licking Pike) to KY 10	Northern terminus of KY 915
Campbell	Wilder	109.755	176.634	KY 1998 east	Western terminus of KY 1998
Campbell	Wilder	111.037	178.697	I-275 east to I-471 I-275 west to I-71 – Airport KY 9 north – Newport	I-275 exit 77; northern terminus of AA Highway; KY 9 continues north into Newport
1.000 mi = 1.609 km; 1.000 km = 0.621 mi: Concurrency terminus

=== Southern spur (KY 9 to I-64) ===
County	Location	mi	km	Destinations	Notes
Carter		0.000	0.000	KY 1 / KY 7 to I-64 – Grayson, Greenbo Lake State Resort Park, Grayson Lake State Park	Southern terminus of KY 9 and southern spur of AA Highway
Carter		1.078	1.735	KY 1959	
Carter		5.486	8.829	KY 7 south	Southern end of KY 7 concurrency
Carter		6.498	10.458	KY 7 north – Carter City	Northern end of KY 7 concurrency
Carter		11.324	18.224	KY 2 / KY 7 – Carter City	
Carter		12.821	20.633	KY 1773 east	Northern terminus of KY 1773
Lewis		22.690	36.516	KY 1149 south	Southern end of KY 1149 concurrency
Lewis		22.899	36.852	KY 1306 north	Western terminus of KY 1306
Lewis		26.310	42.342	AA Hwy (KY 9) north / KY 10 west / KY 1149 north – Vanceburg, Maysville, Alexandria AA Hwy (KY 10) east – South Shore, Greenup, Ashland	Northern terminus of AA Highway southern spur; Mainline AA Highway continues north on KY 9; AA Highway eastern spur continues east on KY 10
1.000 mi = 1.609 km; 1.000 km = 0.621 mi: Concurrency terminus

=== Eastern spur (KY 10) ===
County	Location	mi	km	Destinations	Notes
Lewis		91.581	147.385	AA Hwy (KY 9) north / KY 10 west – Vanceburg, Maysville, Alexandria AA Hwy (KY 9) south / KY 1149 south to I-64 – Grayson, Carter Caves State Resort Park	Western terminus of AA Highway eastern spur; Mainline AA Highway continues north on KY 9; AA Highway southern spur continues south on KY 9
Lewis		93.473	150.430	KY 3020 west (Ronald Reagan Memorial Parkway) – Vanceburg	Eastern terminus of KY 3020
Lewis		96.879	155.912	KY 1306 (Kinney Road) – Garrison	
Lewis		99.158	159.579	KY 3311 (Montgomery Road)	
Lewis		99.985	160.910	To KY 8 (via KY 8C) – Quincy, Portsmouth, OH, South Shore	
Lewis		102.191	164.460	KY 1021 (Briary Road)	
Greenup		105.178	169.268	KY 784 (Shultz Road)	
Greenup		108.181	174.100	KY 784 south	Western end of KY 784 concurrency
Greenup	Letitia	108.502	174.617	KY 784 north	Eastern end of KY 784 concurrency
Greenup		112.916	181.721	KY 7 – South Shore	
Greenup		116.209	187.020	US 23 – South Shore, Greenup, Ashland KY 10 east to US 52 – Ohio	Terminus of AA highway eastern spur; KY 10 continues east to the Ohio River
1.000 mi = 1.609 km; 1.000 km = 0.621 mi: Concurrency terminus
