= Kentucky Route 9 =

Highway in Kentucky

Kentucky Route 9
- KY 9 highlighted in red

Route information
- Maintained by KYTC
- Length: 116.285 mi (187.143 km)
- Component highways: AA Highway from KY 1 / KY 7 to I-275

Major junctions
- South end: KY 1 / KY 7 in Grayson
- AA Hwy (KY 10) near Vanceburg; KY 10 near Tollesboro; US 62 / KY 10 in Maysville; US 68 in Maysville; KY 10 near Germantown; US 27 in Cold Spring; I-275 in Wilder
- North end: KY 8 in Newport

Location
- Country: United States
- State: Kentucky
- Counties: Carter, Lewis, Mason, Bracken, Pendleton, Campbell

Highway system
- Kentucky State Highway System; Interstate; US; State; Parkways
← KY 8	→ KY 10

Kentucky Route 9 is a 116.285-mile-long (187.143 km) state highway maintained by the Kentucky Transportation Cabinet (KYTC) in the U.S. state of Kentucky. The highway extends from Grayson to Newport (a city in Kentucky across the Ohio River from Cincinnati, Ohio), roughly paralleling the Ohio River between Vanceburg and Newport.

Most of its route, from Grayson to the Interstate 275 (I-275) loop in Wilder, is part of the AA Highway, except for its northern 5.3 miles (8.5 km) which continues from the terminus of the AA Highway at I-275 into Newport. Kentucky Route 10 parallels KY 9 along most its route and has two concurrencies with it, one in Mason County and one in Lewis County. At Vanceburg, KY 9 turns south towards Grayson and Interstate 64, and the AA Highway splits into two spurs, one following KY 9 to its southern terminus and one following KY 10 to US Route 23 (US 23) in Greenup.

While KY 9 is not an expressway, it nonetheless serves as the shortest highway link between Cincinnati and Ashland, Kentucky. Most of the route is a rural two-lane highway. The only municipalities on the highway are Vanceburg and Maysville and suburban areas of Cincinnati at its western terminus.

== Route description ==
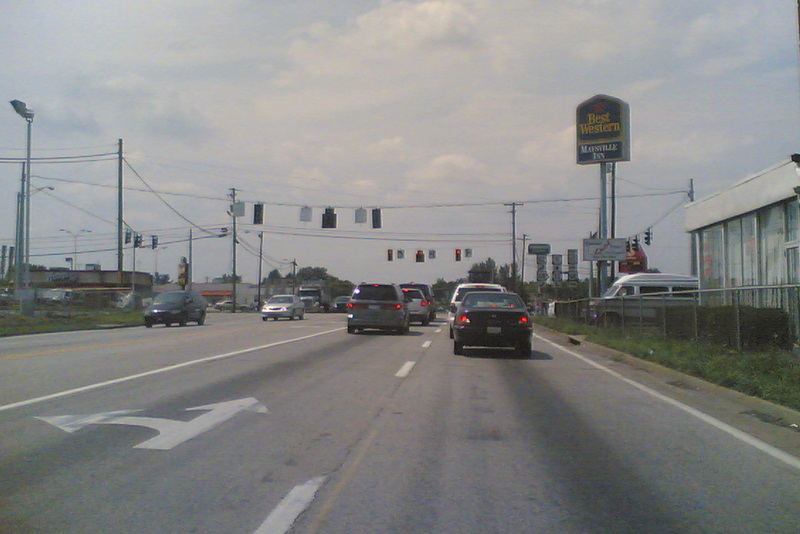
A view of KY9/10 entering Maysville at the intersection of KY 9/KY 10 with US 68 and U.S. 62

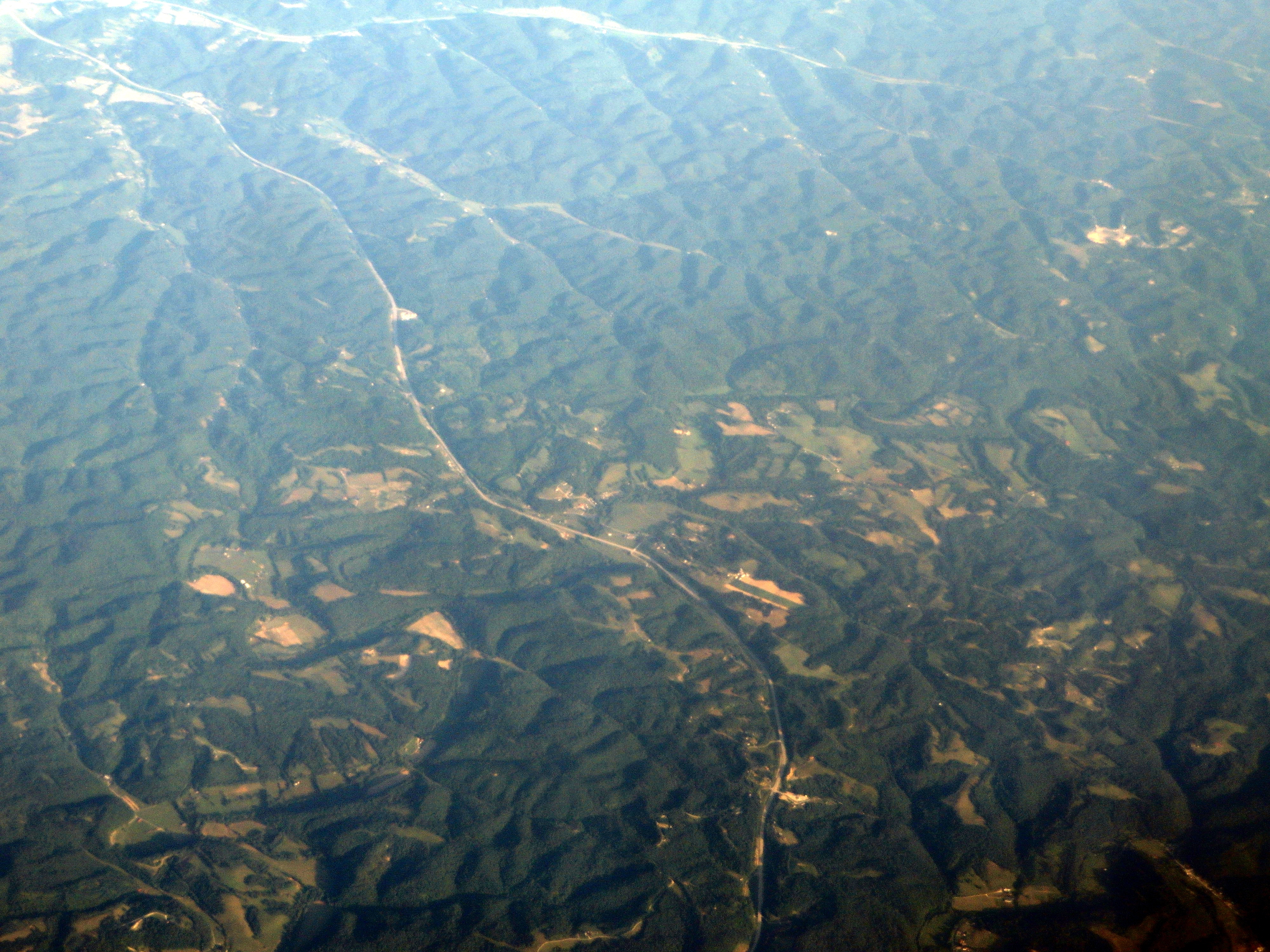
Aerial view of KY 9 in mountainous terrain near its eastern end

KY 9 follows a general northwest–southeast orientation. It begins at a traffic circle intersection with KY 8 in Newport in Campbell County. It is briefly named Chestnut Way, and then Licking Pike as it parallels the Licking River. At the I-275 interchange, it becomes part of the AA Highway and then passes the outskirts of its namesake Alexandria. Within Campbell County, the road is a four-lane arterial highway.

The next segment passes through a remote, hilly region where the road is generally two lanes, with a passing lane present at uphill grades.

A few miles west of Maysville, the route runs concurrently with KY 10 begins, and the road becomes an arterial highway again. The concurrency ends within Maysville, and upon passing out of the city, the road becomes a two-lane rural highway through an agricultural region.

KY 9 then crosses the Allegheny Escarpment into the Appalachian Mountains at the same time that another concurrency with KY 10 begins. The remainder of KY 9 passes through mountainous terrain and is generally two lanes with periodic passing lanes. After passing through Vanceburg, KY 9 turns south and KY 10 continues east; both routes are signed as part of the AA Highway. KY 9 ends at KY 1/KY 7 just north of Grayson and a block from the I-64 interchange.

== Major intersections ==
County	Location	mi	km	Destinations	Notes
Carter		0.000	0.000	KY 1 / KY 7 to I-64 – Grayson, Greenbo Lake State Resort Park, Grayson Lake State Park	Southern terminus of KY 9 and AA Highway spur
Carter		1.078	1.735	KY 1959	
Carter		5.486	8.829	KY 7 south	Southern end of KY 7 concurrency
Carter		6.498	10.458	KY 7 north – Carter City	Northern end of KY 7 concurrency
Carter		11.324	18.224	KY 2 / KY 7 – Carter City	
Carter		12.821	20.633	KY 1773 east	Northern terminus of KY 1773
Lewis		22.690	36.516	KY 1149 south	Southern end of KY 1149 concurrency
Lewis		22.899	36.852	KY 1306 north	Western terminus of KY 1306
Lewis		26.310	42.342	AA Hwy (KY 10) east – South Shore, Greenup, Ashland	Southern terminus of AA Hwy mainline; AA Hwy (KY 9) continues as southern spur and AA Hwy (KY 10) as eastern spur
Lewis		27.265	43.879	KY 1149 north	Northern end of KY 1149 concurrency
Lewis	Vanceburg	29.467	47.423	KY 59 – Olive Hill, Vanceburg	
Lewis		31.011	49.907	KY 2523 north	Southern terminus of KY 2523
Lewis	Clarksburg	32.827	52.830	KY 3037 north	Southern terminus of KY 3037
Lewis	Charters	36.815	59.248	KY 989 south	Northern terminus of KY 989
Lewis	Ribolt	42.518	68.426	KY 10 west	Northern end of KY 10 concurrency
Lewis		46.642	75.063	KY 57 – Flemingsburg, Tollesboro	
Mason		49.685	79.960	KY 1234 east	Southern end of KY 1234 concurrency
Mason		50.078	80.593	KY 1237	
Mason		50.222	80.824	KY 1234 west	Northern end of KY 1234 concurrency
Mason		50.979	82.043	KY 3161 north	Southern terminus of KY 3161
Mason		53.261	85.715	KY 1449 – Orangeburg	
Mason		55.955	90.051	KY 3313	
Mason		56.832	91.462	KY 1448 east	Southern end of KY 1448 concurrency
Mason	Maysville	57.040	91.797	KY 11 / KY 1448 west – Flemingsburg, Maysville	Northern end of KY 1448 concurrency
Mason	Maysville	58.451	94.068	KY 1448	
Mason	Maysville	59.736	96.136	US 62 / KY 10 east – Lexington, Maysville	Southern end of KY 10 concurrency
Mason	Maysville	61.875	99.578	US 68 – Lexington, Aberdeen, OH, Ripley, OH	Interchange
Mason		65.378	105.216	KY 3056 east	Western terminus of KY 3056
Mason		65.606	105.583	KY 10 west – Germantown	Northern end of KY 10 concurrency
Mason		66.545	107.094	KY 435 – Minerva	
Bracken		72.799	117.159	KY 2370 (Dutch Ridge Road)	
Bracken		74.567	120.004	KY 19 – Brooksville, Augusta, Mount Olivet, Augusta Historic District	
Bracken		76.772	123.553	KY 875 – Chatham, Gertrude	
Bracken	Woolcott	79.280	127.589	KY 1159 – Brooksville, Mount Olivet	
Bracken		82.606	132.941	KY 1109 – Bradford, Johnsville	
Bracken		85.877	138.206	KY 1019 – Lenoxburg, Foster	
Bracken		87.830	141.349	KY 2228 east to KY 8 – Foster	Western terminus of KY 2228
Pendleton		89.174	143.512	KY 159 south – Kincaid Lake State Park	Northern terminus of KY 159
Pendleton		91.711	147.595	KY 154 to KY 8 – Peach Grove	
Campbell		93.717	150.823	KY 2828 east (Ivor Road) – Carntown	Western terminus of KY 2828
Campbell	Flagg Spring	94.941	152.793	KY 735 to KY 10 – Mentor	
Campbell		99.316	159.834	KY 1996 (Carthage Road)	
Campbell		101.238	162.927	KY 1997 to KY 10 / KY 547	
Campbell		103.405	166.414	KY 547 – Alexandria, Silver Grove	Interchange
Campbell		105.348	169.541	KY 709 west (East Alexandria Pike)	
Campbell	Cold Spring	107.148	172.438	US 27	Interchange (exit 14)
Campbell	Cold Spring	109.337	175.961	KY 915 south (Licking Pike) to KY 10	Northern terminus of KY 915
Campbell	Wilder	109.755	176.634	KY 1998 east	Western terminus of KY 1998
Campbell	Wilder	111.037	178.697	I-275 east to I-471 I-275 west to I-71 – Airport	I-275 exit 77; northern terminus of AA Hwy
Campbell	Wilder	113.196	182.171	KY 2345 east (Johns Hill Road)	Northern terminus of KY 2345
Campbell	Wilder	113.400	182.500	KY 1632 east (Moock Road)	Western terminus of KY 1632
Campbell	Newport	115.666	186.146	KY 1120 (West Eleventh Street)	
Campbell	Newport	116.231	187.056	KY 8 east (5th Street)	
Campbell	Newport	116.285	187.143	KY 8 west (4th Street)	Northern terminus
1.000 mi = 1.609 km; 1.000 km = 0.621 mi: Concurrency terminus; Route transition
