= Kentucky Route 10 =

State highway in Kentucky, United States

Kentucky Route 10

Route information
- Maintained by KYTC
- Length: 117.760 mi (189.516 km)
- Component highways: AA Highway from KY 9 to US 23

Major junctions
- West end: KY 915 in Alexandria
- US 27 in Alexandria; AA Hwy (KY 9) near Germantown; US 68 in Maysville; US 62 / AA Hwy (KY 9) in Maysville; AA Hwy (KY 9) near Tollesboro; AA Hwy (KY 9) near Vanceburg; US 23 near Greenup
- East end: SR 253 near Greenup

Location
- Country: United States
- State: Kentucky
- Counties: Campbell, Pendleton, Bracken, Mason, Lewis, Greenup

Highway system
- Kentucky State Highway System; Interstate; US; State; Parkways
← KY 9	→ KY 11

Kentucky Route 10 (KY 10) is a highway maintained by the Kentucky Transportation Cabinet (KYTC) that runs from Alexandria (a suburb of Cincinnati, Ohio) to the Jesse Stuart Memorial Bridge at Lloyd, roughly north of Greenup, Kentucky, where the route continues into Ohio as State Route 253 (SR 253).

Along most of its route from Northern Kentucky to Vanceburg, KY 10 parallels the AA Highway (KY 9) and has two concurrencies with it, one in Mason County and one in Lewis County. At Vanceburg, KY 9 turns south towards Grayson, and the AA Highway splits into two spurs, one following KY 9 to its southern terminus and one following KY 10 to US Route 23 (US 23). KY 10 then proceeds into Ohio across the Jesse Stuart Memorial Bridge.

According to Geotab, a telematics company, KY 10 is the least traveled highway in the state of Kentucky.

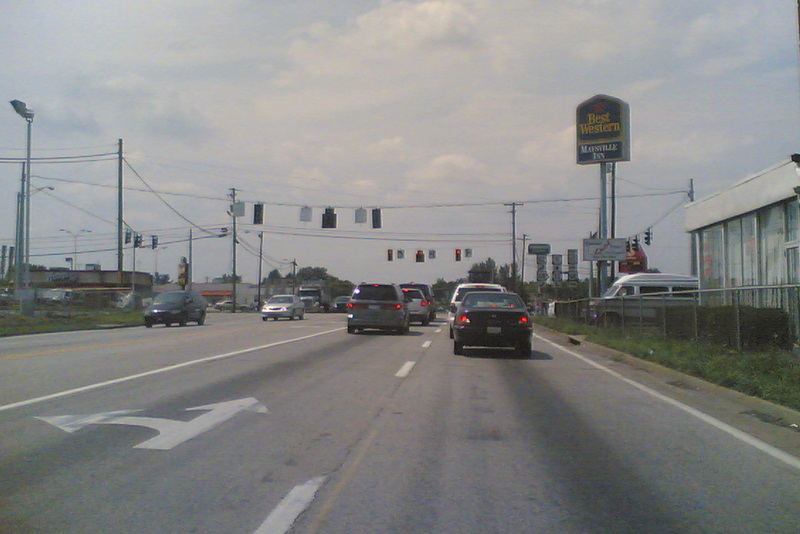
The KY 9/KY 10 intersection with US 62 and US 68 in Maysville

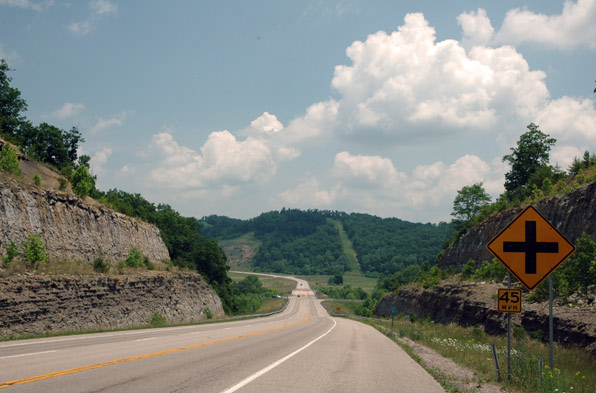
AA Hwy/KY 10 in Greenup County, Kentucky

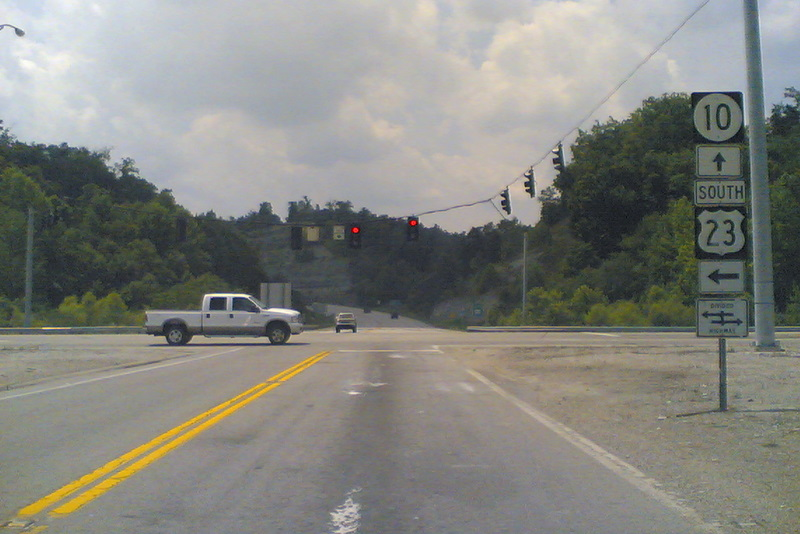
A view of the intersection of US 23, KY 10, and SR 253 just after crossing the Jesse Stuart Memorial Bridge in Greenup

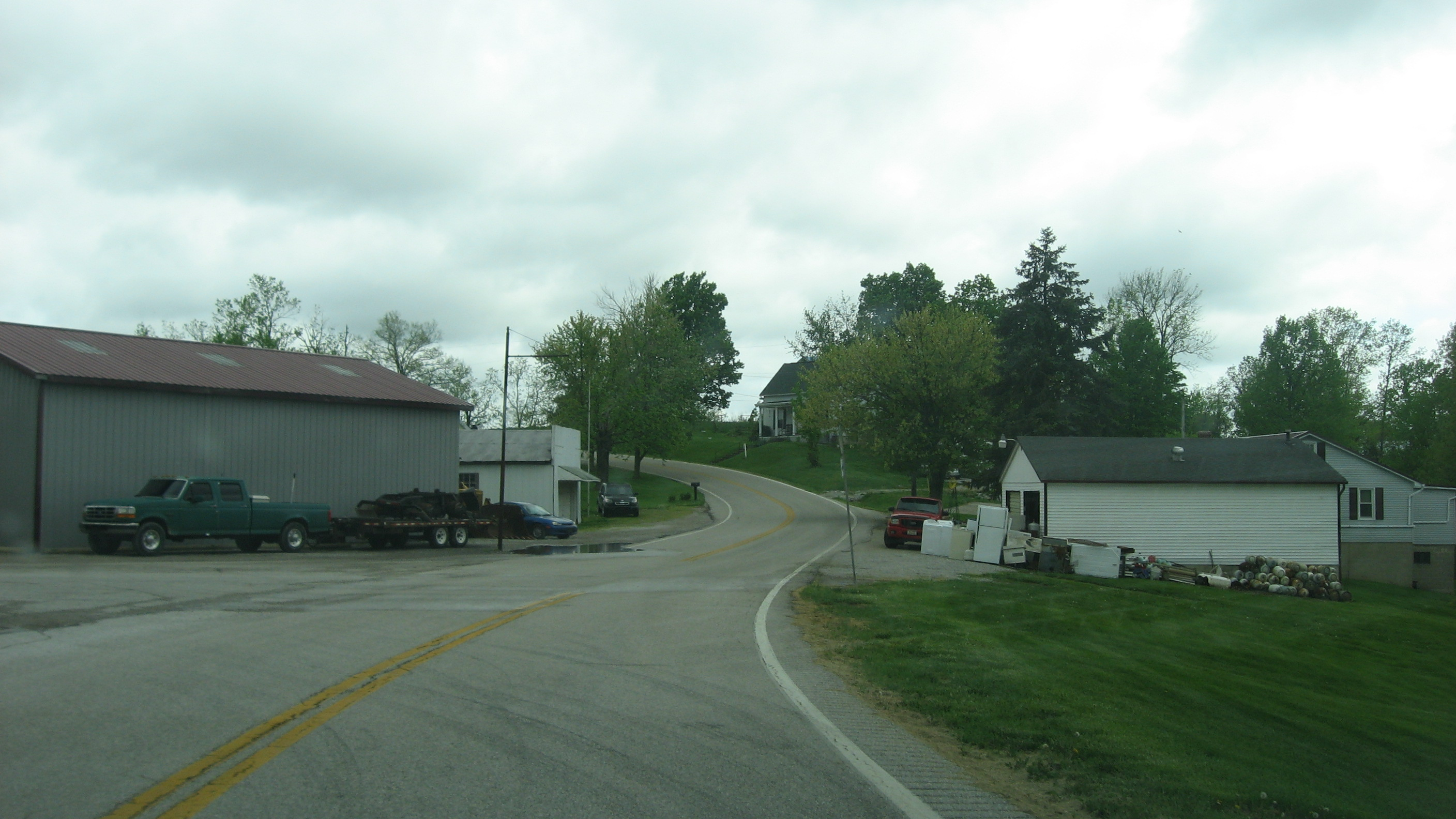
KY-10 as it travels through Lenoxburg

== Major intersections ==
County	Location	mi	km	Destinations	Notes
Campbell	Alexandria	0.000	0.000	KY 915 (Licking Pike)	Western terminus
Campbell	Alexandria	1.305	2.100	US 27 (Alexandria Pike)	
Campbell	Alexandria	1.754	2.823	KY 547 north (Riley Road) – Silver Grove	Southern terminus of KY 547
Campbell	Alexandria	2.055	3.307	KY 1121 south (Persimmon Grove Pike)	Northern terminus of KY 1121
Campbell		4.423	7.118	KY 1997 north (Stonehouse Road)	Southern terminus of KY 1997
Campbell		5.701	9.175	KY 1996 east (Carthage Road)	Western end of KY 1996 concurrency
Campbell		6.197	9.973	KY 1996 west (Stevenson Branch Road)	Eastern end of KY 1996 concurrency
Campbell	Flagg Spring	11.682	18.800	KY 735 east (Smith Road) – Mentor	Western terminus of KY 735
Pendleton	No major junctions				
Campbell		14.805	23.826	KY 1121 north (Persimmon Grove Pike) – Alexandria	Southern terminus of KY 1121
Pendleton	Peach Grove	17.225	27.721	KY 154 west	Western end of KY 154 concurrency
Pendleton	Peach Grove	17.309	27.856	KY 154 east	Eastern end of KY 154 concurrency
Pendleton		20.664	33.255	KY 159 north (New Hope Road)	Western end of KY 159 concurrency
Pendleton	Mount Auburn	20.915	33.659	KY 159 south – Kincaid Lake State Park	Eastern end of KY 159 concurrency
Pendleton		25.870	41.634	KY 1019 north (Lenoxburg-Foster Road) – Foster	Southern terminus of KY 1019
Bracken		28.801	46.351	KY 1109 north (Western Hills Road) – Johnsville, Bradford	Southern terminus of KY 1109
Bracken		30.370	48.876	KY 1011 east (Perkins Ridge Road) – Cumminsville, Bladeston	Western terminus of KY 1011
Bracken		31.469	50.644	KY 2902 west (New Zion Road)	Eastern terminus of KY 2902
Bracken		33.685	54.211	KY 22 west (Willow-Neave Road) – Falmouth	Eastern terminus of KY 22
Bracken	Powersville	36.337	58.479	KY 19 south (Powersville-Harrison County Road) – Milford	Western end of KY 19 concurrency
Bracken	Brooksville	39.916	64.239	KY 1159 north (Bladeston Drive)	Southern terminus of KY 1159
Bracken	Brooksville	40.255	64.784	KY 19 north (Brooksville-Chatham Road) – Chatham, Augusta	Eastern end of KY 19 concurrency
Bracken		45.361	73.001	KY 875 north (Asbury Road) – Chatham, Augusta	Western end of KY 875 concurrency
Bracken	Germantown	46.492	74.822	KY 875 south (Bridgeville Road) – Stonewall	Eastern end of KY 875 concurrency
Mason	Germantown	46.691	75.142	KY 596 south	Northern terminus of KY 596
Mason	Fernleaf	49.633	79.877	KY 435 north (Ida M. Ross Road) – Minerva	Southern terminus of KY 435
Mason		50.473	81.228	AA Hwy (KY 9) north	Western end of KY 9/AA Highway concurrency
Mason		50.701	81.595	KY 3056 east (Germantown Road)	Western terminus of KY 3056
Mason	Maysville	53.954– 54.391	86.831– 87.534	US 68 – Lexington, Aberdeen, OH	Interchange
Mason	Maysville	56.343	90.675	AA Hwy (KY 9) south (East Martin Luther King Highway) / US 62 west – Vanceburg, Lexington	Eastern end of AA Hwy (KY 9) concurrency; western end of US 62 concurrency
Mason	Maysville	57.161	91.992	KY 1448 south (West Maple Leaf Road)	Northern terminus of KY 1448
Mason	Maysville	57.624	92.737	KY 2516 east	Western terminus of KY 2516
Mason	Maysville	58.883	94.763	KY 11 south (Fleming Road) – Flemingsburg, Mt. Sterling, Morehead	Northern terminus of KY 11
Mason	Maysville	59.190	95.257	US 62 east (East Third Street) to KY 8 – Aberdeen, OH	Eastern end of US 62 concurrency
Mason	Maysville	59.542	95.824	Lexington Street (KY 2519 south)	Northern terminus of KY 2519
Mason	Maysville	60.539	97.428	KY 2513 west (Carmel Street)	Eastern terminus of KY 2513
Mason		61.547	99.050	KY 1449 south (Orangeburg Road)	Northern terminus of KY 1449
Mason		66.844	107.575	KY 3161 south to AA Hwy (KY 9)	Northern terminus of KY 3161
Mason		67.805	109.122	KY 1237 south (Bridgeport Road)	Northern terminus of KY 1237
Mason		68.575	110.361	KY 1234 south	Northern terminus of KY 1234
Lewis	Tollesboro	71.585	115.205	KY 57 north – Concord	Western end of KY 57 concurrency
Lewis	Tollesboro	71.670	115.342	KY 57 south – Mt. Carmel	Eastern end of KY 57 concurrency
Lewis		75.373	121.301	AA Hwy (KY 9) north – Maysville, Alexandria	Western end of AA Hwy (KY 9) concurrency
Lewis	Charters	81.076	130.479	KY 989 south (Salt Lick Road)	Northern terminus of KY 989
Lewis	Clarksburg	85.064	136.897	KY 3037 east (Clarksburg Rd.) – Vanceburg	Western terminus of KY 3037
Lewis	Vanceburg	86.880	139.820	KY 2523 north (Lions Lane) – Lewis County High School	Southern terminus of KY 2523
Lewis	Vanceburg	88.424	142.305	KY 59 (Fairlane Drive) – Olive Hill	
Lewis		90.626	145.848	KY 1149 north (Town Branch Road)	Western end of KY 1149 concurrency
Lewis		91.581	147.385	AA Hwy (KY 9) south / KY 1149 south (Grayson Spur) to I-64 – Grayson, Carter Caves State Resort Park	Western terminus of AA Hwy (KY 10) designation; eastern end of AA Hwy (KY 9) concurrency and KY 1149 concurrency
Lewis		93.473	150.430	KY 3020 west (Ronald Reagan Memorial Parkway) – Vanceburg	Eastern terminus of KY 3020
Lewis		96.879	155.912	KY 1306 (Kinney Road) – Garrison	
Lewis		99.158	159.579	KY 3311 (Montgomery Road)	
Lewis		99.985	160.910	To KY 8 – Quincy, Portsmouth, OH, South Shore	
Lewis		102.191	164.460	KY 1021 (Briary Road)	
Greenup		105.178	169.268	KY 784 (Shultz Road)	
Greenup		108.181	174.100	KY 784 south	Western end of KY 784 concurrency
Greenup	Letitia	108.502	174.617	KY 784 north	Eastern end of KY 784 concurrency
Greenup		112.916	181.721	KY 7 – South Shore	
Greenup		116.209	187.020	US 23 – South Shore, Greenup, Ashland; AA Hwy – Vanceburg, Maysville, Alexandria	Eastern terminus of AA Highway
Greenup		116.507	187.500	KY 3116 – Grays Branch, Lloyd, Greenup Lock and Dam	
Greenup Lock and Dam; Ohio River		116.861– 117.471	188.070– 189.051	Jesse Stuart Memorial Bridge	
Scioto		0.000	0.000	SR 253 east to US 52	Road continues as OH 253
1.000 mi = 1.609 km; 1.000 km = 0.621 mi: Concurrency terminus; Route transition
