= Kentucky Route 8 =

Highway in Kentucky

Kentucky Route 8

Route information
- Maintained by KYTC
- Length: 114.202 mi (183.790 km)

Western segment
- Length: 78.819 mi (126.847 km)
- West end: KY 237 near Francisville
- Major intersections: I-71 / I-75 in Covington; US 25 / US 42 / US 127 in Covington; US 27 in Newport; I-471 in Newport; US 68 in Maysville
- East end: US 62 in Maysville

Eastern segment
- Length: 35.383 mi (56.943 km)
- West end: KY 57 / KY 3550 in Concord
- East end: US 23 in South Portsmouth

Location
- Country: United States
- State: Kentucky
- Counties: Boone, Kenton, Campbell, Pendleton, Bracken, Mason, Lewis, Greenup

Highway system
- Kentucky State Highway System; Interstate; US; State; Parkways
← KY 7	→ KY 9

Kentucky Route 8 is a 114.202-mile-long (183.790 km) east–west state highway divided into two distinct segments across northern Kentucky. The western terminus of the route is at KY 237 near Francisville. The eastern terminus is at U.S. Route 23 in South Portsmouth. The two distinct segments of this route were not meant to be connected together. KY 8 from its west end in Boone County to Augusta in Bracken County is designated as a part of an identified corridor for bikes named the Ramblin' River Tour by the American Association of State Highway and Transportation Officials (AASHTO).

KY 8 is named the Mary Ingles Highway for part of its length. It is rumored that she was the first white woman in Kentucky. Captured by Indians in Virginia in 1755 and taken to Ohio, she later escaped a salt-making party at Big Bone Lick and made her way across the Kentucky wilderness back home to Virginia.

== Route description ==
=== Western segment ===
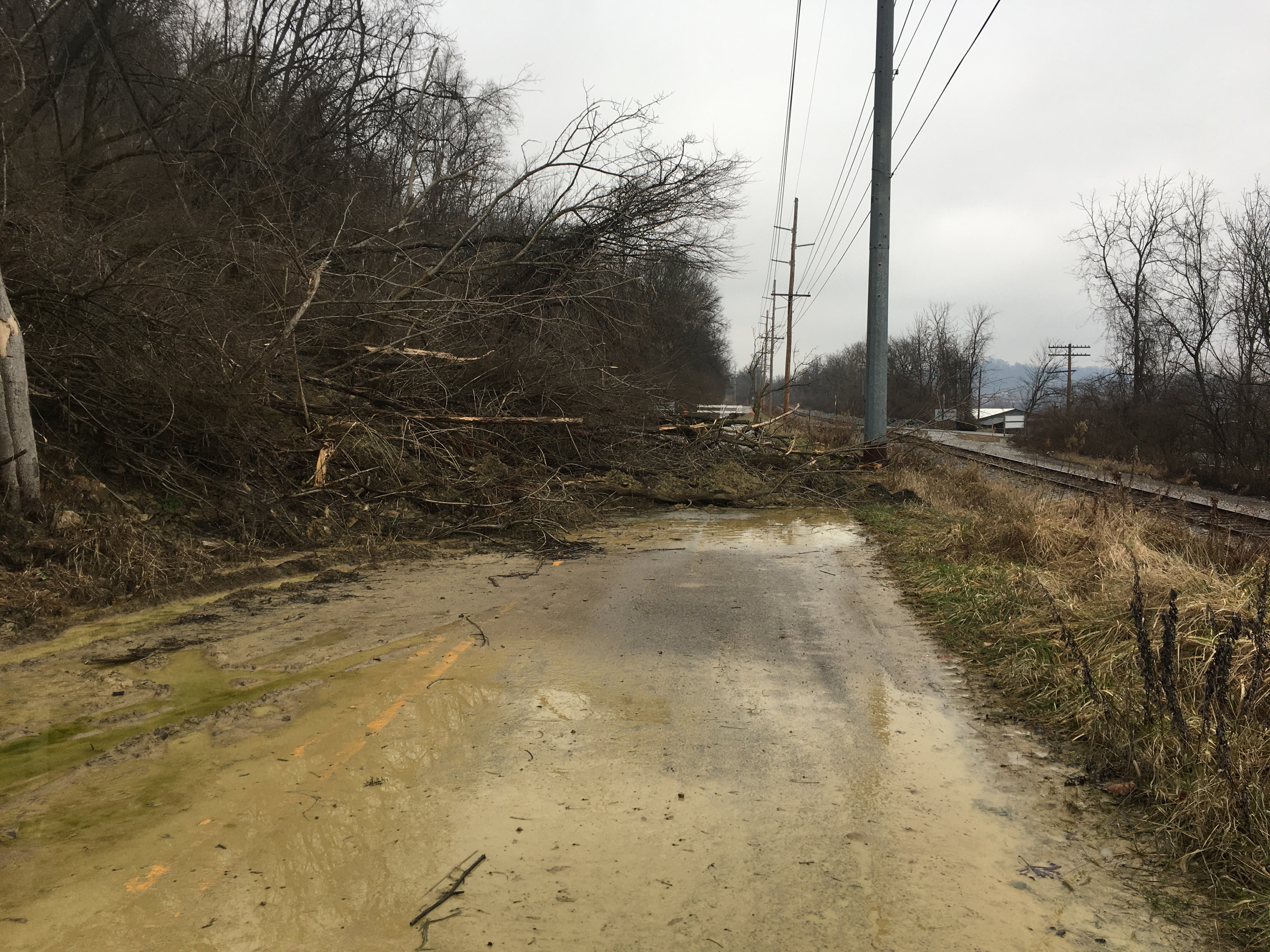
Landslide on a section of Kentucky Route 8 in Fort Thomas that closed the road in 2018, Now the section is reopened and signed KY 6335.

The western segment of KY 8, the longer of the two, extends 78.819 miles (126.847 km) between rural Boone County and Maysville. KY 8 begins 1.5 miles west of Kentucky Route 237 along River Road near Francisville. The route runs parallel to the Ohio River as it heads eastward, passing through Covington, Newport, and Augusta before ending at an intersection with US 62 in Maysville.

KY 8 has been re-routed from its original path along Mary Ingles Highway in Fort Thomas due to a landslide. According to Mike Bezold, a member of the Kentucky Transport Cabinet, the cost to repair the damaged section of road would be $50 million despite having a low number of drivers. Now, KY 8 follows KY 1998 out of Silver Grove until it meets up with US 27 in Cold Spring. It then returns to its original route in Newport, but creates a small spur through Bellevue and Dayton. Its previous route along Mary Ingles Highway in Fort Thomas has since been replaced with KY 445 to between Industrial Road and River Road. The rest of the route up to Dayton has since been reclassified as KY 6335. The Ramblin' River Tour which inhabits the part of the KY 8 that has been closed has not been redesignated as bicycles are still able to pass the landslide with ease. This section was reopened in July 2024. However, the route still follows US 27 within the area.

=== Eastern segment ===
The eastern segment of KY 8 extends for 39.933 miles (64.266 km) from Concord-Trinity Road west of Concord to U.S. Route 23 in South Portsmouth west of South Shore. The western terminus of this portion is a very narrow two-lane road that becomes gravel.

From Kentucky Route 3037 in Vanceburg to its eastern terminus at US 23, KY 8 was formerly designated Kentucky Route 10, with KY 8 ending at KY 3037 (then KY 10). The road became part of KY 8 in the late-1990s after KY 10 was rerouted onto the AA Highway to the south.

== Major intersections ==
=== Western segment ===
County	Location	mi	km	Destinations	Notes
Boone		1.528	2.459	KY 237 south (North Bend Road) to I-275	Northern terminus of KY 237
Boone	Taylorsport	4.575	7.363	KY 2846 west (Tanner Road) to I-275 – Hebron	Eastern terminus of KY 2846
Boone	Constance	8.458	13.612	KY 20 west (Petersburg Road) to I-275	Eastern terminus of KY 20
Boone	Constance			Anderson Ferry Road - Anderson Ferry	
Kenton	Villa Hills	9.617	15.477	KY 371 south (Amsterdam Road)	Northern terminus of KY 371
Kenton	Ludlow	13.536	21.784	KY 1072 south (Deverill Street)	north terminus of KY 1072
Kenton	Covington	15.929	25.635	West 3rd Street (KY 2374 east)	Western terminus of KY 2374
Kenton	Covington	16.152	25.994	I-71 / I-75 – Cincinnati, Lexington, Louisville	I-75 exit 192
Kenton	Covington	16.312	26.252	Philadelphia Street (KY 3090 north)	
Kenton	Covington	16.459	26.488	US 25 / US 42 / US 127 (Main Street)	
Kenton	Covington	16.551	26.636	Johnson Street (KY 2374 west)	Eastern terminus of KY 2374
Kenton	Covington	16.918	27.227	KY 17 south (Scott Boulevard)	
Kenton	Covington	16.999	27.357	KY 17 north (Greenup Street)	
Campbell	Newport	17.621	28.358	KY 9 south (Central)	Northern terminus of KY 9
Campbell	Newport	17.802	28.650	US 27 south (York Street)	west end of US 27 overlap
Campbell	Newport	18.04	29.03	US 27 north (Taylor Southgate Bridge)	east end of US 27 overlap; one-block overlap of US 27 north and KY 8 west; traffic circle
Campbell	Newport	18.553	29.858	I-471 to I-275 – Cincinnati	I-471 exit 5
Campbell	Fort Thomas	25.310	40.732	KY 445 north (River Road)	Southern terminus of KY 445
Campbell	Highland Heights	25.689	41.342	KY 2926 south (Winters Lane)	north terminus of KY 2926
Campbell	Silver Grove	26.472	42.603	KY 1998 west (Industrial Road)	Eastern terminus of KY 1998
Campbell	Silver Grove	28.189	45.366	KY 547 south (Four Mile Pike) – Alexandria	Northern terminus of KY 547
Campbell	Oneonta	35.192	56.636	KY 1566 west (Oneonta Road) to KY 9	Eastern terminus of KY 1566
Campbell	New Richmond Station	36.766	59.169	KY 2921 west (Painter Road) to KY 9	east terminus of KY 2921
Campbell		37.316	60.054	KY 1996 west (New Richmond Road) to KY 9	Eastern terminus of KY 1996
Campbell	Mentor	41.689	67.092	KY 735 west (Smith Road) to KY 9	east terminus of KY 735
Pendleton	Ivor	43.618	70.196	KY 2828 west (Ivor Road) to AA Hwy (KY 9)	Eastern terminus of KY 2828
Pendleton	Carntown	45.467	73.172	KY 154 west – Peach Grove	Eastern terminus of KY 154
Bracken	Foster	48.688	78.356	KY 2228 (Foster Road)	Eastern terminus of KY 2228
Bracken	Foster	48.936	78.755	KY 1019 south (Lenoxburg Foster Road) – Lenoxburg	Northern terminus of KY 1019
Bracken	Bradford	52.813	84.994	KY 1109 south (Bradford Road) to KY 9	Northern terminus of KY 1109
Bracken	Wellsburg	55.293	88.985	KY 1159 south (Wellsburg Woolcott Road)	Northern terminus of KY 1159
Bracken	Augusta	61.326	98.695	KY 19 south (Augusta-Chatham Road)	Northern terminus of KY 19
Bracken	Augusta	61.431	98.864	KY 435 south (Augusta Minerva Road)	Northern terminus of KY 435
Mason	Dover	67.824	109.152	KY 1235 south (Dover Minerva Road)	Northern terminus of KY 1235
Mason	South Ripley	69.906	112.503	KY 576 south (Tuckahoe Road)	north terminus of KY 576
Mason	Maysville	74.114	119.275	KY 1597 south (Charleston Bottoms Road)	Northern terminus of KY 1597
Mason	Maysville	75.686	121.805	US 68 / to AA Highway (KY 9) – Ripley, OH, Aberdeen, OH	interchange
Mason	Maysville	77.542	124.792	KY 3056 west (Jersey Ridge Road)	Eastern terminus of KY 3056
Mason	Maysville	78.819	126.847	US 62 (Third Street / Simon Kenton Memorial Bridge / US 68 Bus.)	Eastern terminus
1.000 mi = 1.609 km; 1.000 km = 0.621 mi: Concurrency terminus

=== Eastern segment ===
County	Location	mi	km	Destinations	Notes
Lewis	Concord	0.000	0.000	KY 57 south / KY 3550 west	Western terminus
Lewis	Vanceburg	12.622	20.313	KY 3037 south (Clarksburg Road) to AA Hwy (KY 9)	Northern terminus of KY 3037
Lewis	Vanceburg	12.962	20.860	KY 59 south / Main Street	Northern terminus of KY 59; former KY 2525 east
Lewis	Vanceburg	13.310	21.420	Second Street	former KY 2525 west
Lewis		15.891	25.574	KY 3020 east	Western terminus of KY 3020
Lewis	Garrison	22.063	35.507	KY 1306 south (Kinney Road)	north terminus of KY 1306
Lewis	Garrison	23.011	37.033	KY 3311 south (Montgomery Road)	Northern terminus of KY 3311
Lewis		24.016	38.650	To AA Hwy (KY 10) (via KY 8C)	Northern terminus of KY 8C
Lewis	Quincy	24.916	40.098	KY 1021 south (Briary Road)	Northern terminus of KY 1021
Greenup	South Portsmouth	34.360	55.297	US 23 Truck north / KY 8S north (Carl Perkins Bridge) to US 52 – Portsmouth	west end of US 23 Truck overlap
Greenup	South Portsmouth	35.383	56.943	US 23 (U.S. Grant Bridge) – Greenup, Ashland, Portsmouth	east end of US 23 Truck overlap
1.000 mi = 1.609 km; 1.000 km = 0.621 mi
