= Kentucky Route 735 =

State highway in Kentucky, United States

Kentucky Route 735
- Smith Road
- KY 735 highlighted in red

Route information
- Maintained by KYTC
- Length: 0.98 mi (1,580 m)

Major junctions
- West end: KY 10 at Flagg Spring
- AA Hwy (KY 9) at Flagg Spring
- East end: KY 8 in Mentor

Location
- Country: United States
- State: Kentucky
- Counties: Campbell

Highway system
- Kentucky State Highway System; Interstate; US; State; Parkways
← KY 734	→ KY 736

Kentucky Route 735 (KY 735) is a 0.98-mile-long (1.58 km) state highway in southeastern Campbell County, Kentucky, that runs from Kentucky Route 10 at Flagg Spring to Kentucky Route 8 in northern Mentor.

== History ==
KY 735 was formed after 1955, but its original route is unknown (probably in a route between Cumberland and Grayson county alphabetically).

== Major intersections ==
The entire route is in Campbell County.

Location	mi	km	Destinations	Notes
Flagg Spring	0.000	0.000	KY 10 (Flagg Springs Pike) – Brooksville, Alexandria	Western terminus
Flagg Spring	0.043	0.069	AA Hwy (KY 9)	
Mentor	0.980	1.577	KY 8 (Mary Ingles Highway)	Eastern terminus
1.000 mi = 1.609 km; 1.000 km = 0.621 mi
