= Cumminsville =

Cumminsville may refer to:

- Cumminsville, Kentucky
- Cumminsville, Nebraska
- Cumminsville, New York

== Cincinnati neighborhoods ==
- Northside, Cincinnati, formerly known as Cumminsville
- South Cumminsville, Cincinnati
