= Kentucky Route 445 =

State highway in Kentucky, United States

Kentucky Route 445
- KY 445 highlighted in red

Route information
- Maintained by KYTC
- Length: 2.592 mi (4.171 km)

Major junctions
- South end: KY 8 in Cold Spring
- KY 1120 in Fort Thomas
- North end: US 27 in Fort Thomas

Location
- Country: United States
- State: Kentucky
- Counties: Campbell

Highway system
- Kentucky State Highway System; Interstate; US; State; Parkways
← KY 444	→ KY 446

Kentucky Route 445 (KY 445) is a 2.258-mile-long (3.634 km) state highway in the U.S. state of Kentucky. The highway travels through mostly urban areas of Campbell County. Most of its length is in the city limits of Fort Thomas, though the eastern segment is on the northern edges of Cold Spring.

== Route description ==
KY 445 begins at an intersection with KY 8 (Mary Ingles Highway) in the northern part of Cold Spring, within the northern part of Campbell County. It travels to the northwest along the Ohio River along a former section of KY-8. After crossing under I-275, it turns west along River Road and continues into Fort Thomas. It passes the Tower Park Soccer Field and curves to the west-northwest. It begins a brief concurrency with KY 1120 (South Ft. Thomas Avenue). The two highways travel to the southwest and curve to the south-southwest. When KY 445 splits off, it travels to the west-northwest and meets its eastern terminus, an intersection with U.S. Route 27 (US 27; Alexandria Pike). This intersection is on the eastern edge of the Highland Country Club golf course.

== Major intersections ==
The entire route is in Campbell County.

Location	mi	km	Destinations	Notes
Cold Spring	0.000	0.000	KY 8 (Mary Ingles Highway / Dodsworth Lane)	Southern terminus. KY-8 to the east and south. Former northern terminus of KY-1998.
Cold Spring	0.773	1.244	KY 2926 north (Winters Lane)	Southern terminus of KY 2926
Fort Thomas	1.162	1.870	KY 6335 west (Mary Ingles Highway)	Eastern terminus of KY 6335. Former KY-8 and former northern terminus of KY-445.
Fort Thomas	2.200	3.541	KY 1120 west (South Ft. Thomas Avenue)	Southern end of KY 1120 concurrency
Fort Thomas	2.354	3.788	KY 1120 east (South Ft. Thomas Avenue)	Northern end of KY 1120 concurrency
Fort Thomas	2.592	4.171	US 27 (Alexandria Pike) – Alexandria, Cincinnati	Northern terminus
1.000 mi = 1.609 km; 1.000 km = 0.621 mi
