= Johnsville =

Johnsville may refer to any of the following locations in the United States:

- Johnsville, Arkansas
- Johnsville, California
- Johnsville, Kentucky
- Johnsville, Maryland
- Johnsville Naval Air Development Center, officially NAWC, Aircraft Division, Warminster, a former research and development facility for the United States Navy
- Johnsville, a former place-name in New York; now East Fishkill
- Johnsville, Ohio
- Johnsville, Pennsylvania, now Warminster Township, Pennsylvania
- St. Johnsville, New York, town and village
