= Parina, Kentucky =

Unincorporated community in Kentucky, United States

Parina
- Unincorporated community
- Location within the state of Kentucky Parina (the United States)
- Coordinates: 38°37′53″N 84°2′44″W
- Country: United States
- State: Kentucky
- County: Bracken
- Elevation: 883 ft (269 m)
- Time zone: UTC-6 (Central (CST))
  - Summer (DST): UTC-5 (CST)
- GNIS feature ID: 2362840

Parina is a road in Bracken County, Kentucky.
