= Kentucky Route 1632 =

State highway in Kentucky, United States

Kentucky Route 1632
- Moock Road
- KY 1632 highlighted in red

Route information
- Maintained by KYTC
- Length: 1.660 mi (2.672 km)

Major junctions
- East end: KY 9 in Wilder
- West end: US 27 / KY 8 in Southgate

Location
- Country: United States
- State: Kentucky
- Counties: Campbell

Highway system
- Kentucky State Highway System; Interstate; US; State; Parkways
| ← KY 1631 | → KY 1633 |

Kentucky Route 1632 (KY 1632) is a 1.66-mile-long (2.67 km) state highway in Campbell County, Kentucky. It connects KY 9 in Wilder with US 27 and KY 8 in Southgate, Kentucky, just south of the border with Fort Thomas, near Exit 2 of I-471. It is considered a secondary road and is signed Moock Road for its entire length.

== Route description ==
KY 1632 begins at an intersection with KY 9 in Wilder, heading east on two-lane undivided Moock Road. The road heads through wooded areas with some residential development, curving to the northeast. The route turns to the east again before heading northeast again. KY 1632 comes to its eastern terminus at an intersection with US 27 in Southgate just northwest of an interchange with I-471.

== Major intersections ==
The entire route is in Campbell County.

| Location | mi | km | Destinations | Notes |
|---|---|---|---|---|
| Wilder | 0.000 | 0.000 | KY 9 (Licking Pike) | |
| Southgate | 1.660 | 2.672 | US 27 / KY 8 (Alexandria Pike) | |
1.000 mi = 1.609 km; 1.000 km = 0.621 mi
