= Kentucky Route 19 =

State highway in Kentucky, United States

Kentucky Route 19
- KY 19 highlighted in red

Route information
- Maintained by KYTC
- Length: 23.798 mi (38.299 km)

Major junctions
- South end: US 62 at Harrison/Robertson County line
- KY 10 near Brooksville; KY 10 in Brooksville; AA Hwy (KY 9) near Augusta
- North end: KY 8 in Augusta

Location
- Country: United States
- State: Kentucky
- Counties: Harrison, Bracken

Highway system
- Kentucky State Highway System; Interstate; US; State; Parkways
← KY 18	→ KY 20

Kentucky Route 19 is a 23.798-mile-long (38.299 km) state highway in Kentucky that runs from US 62 at the Harrison/Robertson County line to KY 8 in Augusta.

== Route description ==
KY 19 straddles the Harrison/Robertson County line for 2.862-mile-long (4.606 km) before entering into Bracken County, where it forms a junction with KY 2897. Southwest of Brooksville, KY 19 joins KY 10. KY 19 leaves KY 10 in Brooksville and continues north junctioning with KY 9/AA Highway before entering Augusta and ending at KY 8.

== Major intersections ==
County	Location	mi	km	Destinations	Notes
Harrison		0.000	0.000	US 62	Southern terminus
Bracken		2.862	4.606	KY 2897 (Chapel Road)	
Bracken		4.812	7.744	KY 539 (Neave Milford Road)	South end of KY 539 overlap
Bracken		5.125	8.248	KY 539 (Santa Fe Road)	North end of KY 539 overlap
Bracken		10.536	16.956	KY 165 (Old Oakland Road)	
Bracken		11.451	18.429	KY 10 (Brooksville-Powersville Road)	South end of KY 10 overlap
Bracken	Brooksville	15.030	24.188	KY 1159 (Bladeston Drive)	
Bracken	Brooksville	15.369	24.734	KY 10 (East Miami Street)	North end of KY 10 overlap
Bracken		18.764	30.198	KY 875 (Mount Zion Road)	South end of KY 875 overlap
Bracken		19.323	31.097	KY 875 (Asbury Road)	North end of KY 875 overlap
Bracken		20.637	33.212	AA Hwy (KY 9)	
Bracken	Augusta	23.798	38.299	KY 8 (Mary Ingles Highway)	Northern terminus
1.000 mi = 1.609 km; 1.000 km = 0.621 mi: Concurrency terminus
