= Powersville, Kentucky =

Unincorporated community in Kentucky, United States

Powersville
- Unincorporated community
- Location within the state of Kentucky Powersville (the United States)
- Coordinates: 38°39′24″N 84°6′44″W
- Country: United States
- State: Kentucky
- County: Bracken
- Elevation: 968 ft (295 m)
- Time zone: UTC-5 (Eastern (EST))
  - Summer (DST): UTC-4 (EDT)
- GNIS feature ID: 501261

Powersville is an unincorporated community located in Bracken County, Kentucky, United States.

== History ==
A post office called Powersville was established in 1831, and remained in operation until 1904. John F. Power, the postmaster, gave the community its name.

An inn and tavern once stood in the community at the junction of KY 19 and 10, serving during the mid to late 1800s as an overnight stagecoach stopover on the road connecting Augusta and Cynthiana. The structure was built as a hunting lodge by Phillip Buckner: a Revolutionary War veteran, settler of Powersville, and founder of the city of Augusta, Kentucky. Buckner acquired the land through grants for his military service during the war. He lived at the lodge until his death in 1830 and was buried in the community. In the first half of the 20th century, the log structure was used as a toll house and later a parsonage for the Powersville Christian Church. The structure remained in its original location until 2012, when it was moved to Pendleton County for use as a private residence.
