= Immaculate Conception Catholic Church (Peach Grove, Kentucky) =

Historic site in Pendleton County, Kentucky

- Immaculate Conception Catholic Church and Cemetery
- U.S. National Register of Historic Places
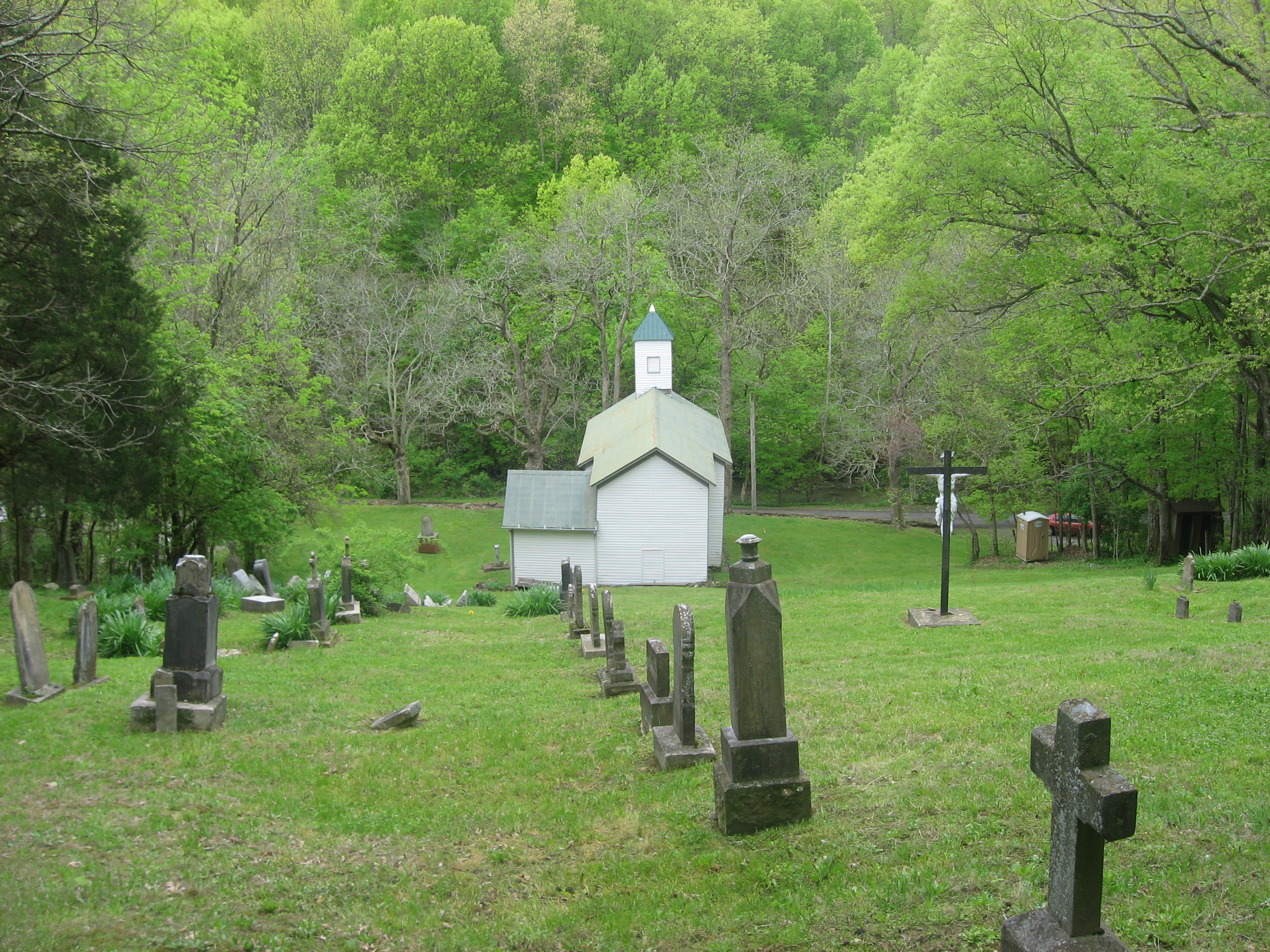
- Looking down on the church from its hillside cemetery

- Location within Kentucky Location within the United States
- Location: Stepstone Rd., near Peach Grove, Kentucky
- Coordinates: 38°50′28″N 84°15′52″W
- Area: 3 acres (1.2 ha)
- Built: 1861
- Architect: Michael Faulhaber
- NRHP reference No.: 86003729
- Added to NRHP: January 28, 1987

The Immaculate Conception Catholic Church and Cemetery near Peach Grove, Kentucky, was built in 1860 or 1861. It was added to the National Register of Historic Places in 1987. The church is also known as Stepstone Church.

The church is a one-story front-gabled clapboard building, built of log joists and rough-cut boards on a fieldstone foundation. It has a wooden cupola with a louvered vent, topped by an iron ball and cross.
