= Bladeston, Kentucky =

Unincorporated community in Kentucky, United States

Bladeston
- Unincorporated community
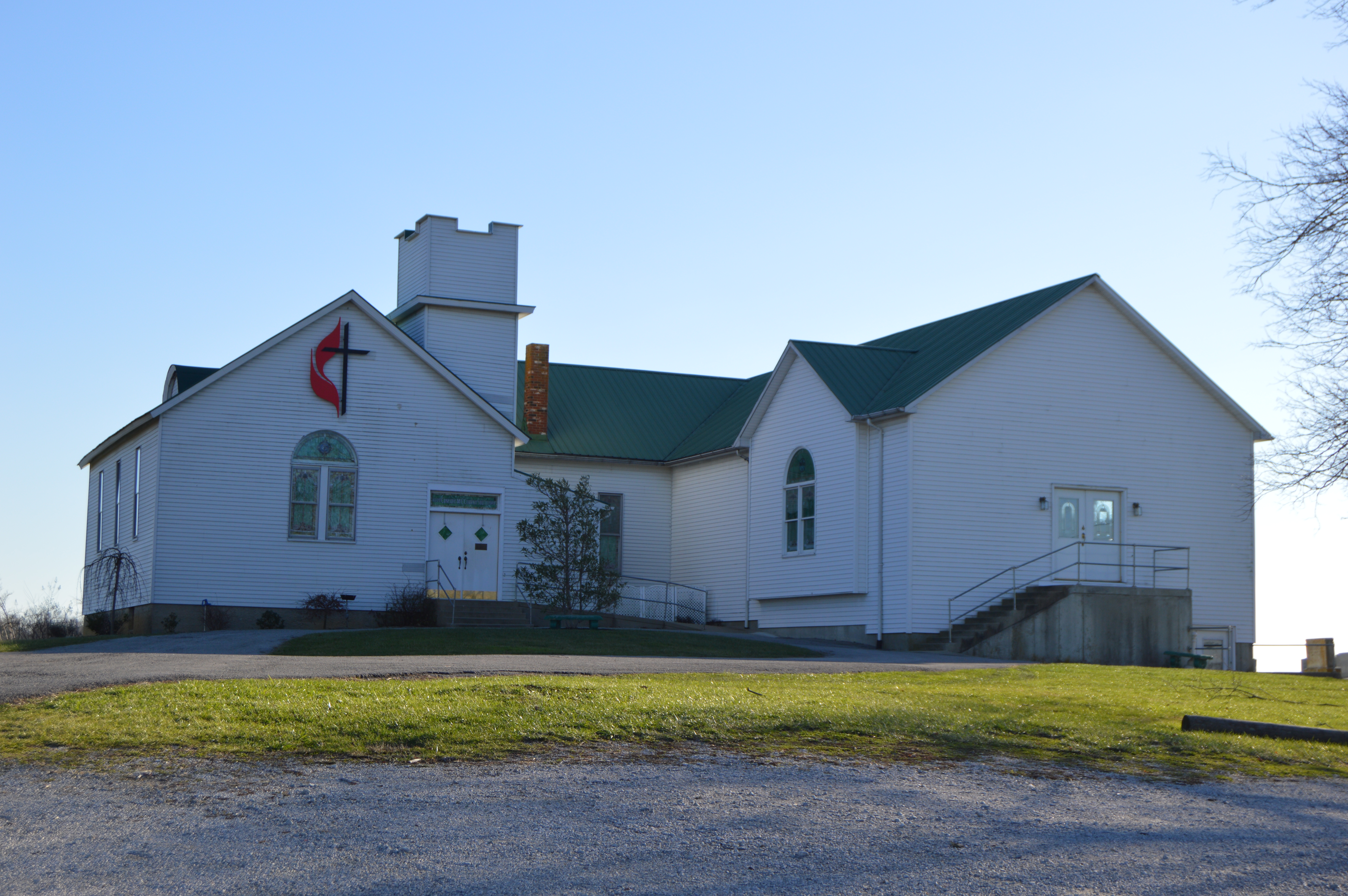
- Concord United Methodist Church

- Location within the state of Kentucky Bladeston (the United States)
- Coordinates: 38°43′17″N 84°5′48″W
- Country: United States
- State: Kentucky
- County: Bracken
- Elevation: 860 ft (260 m)
- Time zone: UTC-5 (Eastern (EST))
  - Summer (DST): UTC-4 (EST)
- GNIS feature ID: 507521

Bladeston is an unincorporated community located in Bracken County, Kentucky, United States. Their post office is no longer in service.
