= Kentucky Route 446 =

State highway in Kentucky, United States

Kentucky Route 446
- KY 446 highlighted in red

Route information
- Maintained by KYTC
- Length: 0.970 mi (1,561 m)

Major junctions
- West end: US 31W / US 68 / KY 80 in Bowling Green
- East end: I-65 in Bowling Green

Location
- Country: United States
- State: Kentucky
- Counties: Warren

Highway system
- Kentucky State Highway System; Interstate; US; State; Parkways
← KY 445	→ KY 447

Kentucky Route 446 (KY 446) is a state highway in the city of Bowling Green in Warren County, Kentucky. The highway runs 0.970 miles (1.561 km) from U.S. Route 31W, US 68, and KY 80 east to Interstate 65 (I-65). KY 446 is a four-lane divided highway that serves as a connector between the Interstate and U.S. Highways east of Bowling Green and provides access to the National Corvette Museum and the Bowling Green Assembly Plant.

== Route description ==
KY 446 begins at a modified trumpet interchange with Louisville Road, on which US 31W, US 68, and KY 80 run concurrently, at the eastern edge of the city of Bowling Green. The junction includes a flyover from KY 446 to westbound Louisville Road and a left turn from westbound Louisville Road to KY 446. KY 446's only intermediate intersection is with Corvette Drive, which leads south to the National Corvette Museum and north to the Bowling Green Assembly Plant, where General Motors manufactures the Chevrolet Corvette. The highway reaches its eastern terminus at a trumpet interchange with I-65. The Kentucky Transportation Cabinet classifies KY 446 as a state primary highway.

== History ==
KY 446 was formed in 1966.

The original KY 446 ran from downtown Louisville to Valley Gardens; part of this road became an extension of KY 1230 and the rest (Terry Road) was decommissioned, and is now KY 1727.

== Major intersections ==
The entire route is in Bowling Green, Warren County.

mi	km	Destinations	Notes
0.000	0.000	US 31W / US 68 / KY 80 (Louisville Road) – Bowling Green	Western terminus; modified trumpet interchange
0.970	1.561	I-65 – Louisville, Nashville	Eastern terminus; I-65 exit 28
1.000 mi = 1.609 km; 1.000 km = 0.621 mi
