= Kentucky Route 709 =

State highway in Kentucky, United States

Kentucky Route 709
- East Alexandria Pike
- KY 709 highlighted in red

Route information
- Maintained by KYTC
- Length: 0.476 mi (766 m)
- Existed: 1999–present

Major junctions
- South end: US 27 in Alexandria
- North end: AA Hwy (KY 9) in Alexandria

Location
- Country: United States
- State: Kentucky
- Counties: Campbell

Highway system
- Kentucky State Highway System; Interstate; US; State; Parkways
← KY 708	→ KY 710

Kentucky Route 709 (KY 709) is a 0.476-mile-long (0.766 km) state highway in northern Alexandria, Kentucky, that connects U.S. Route 27 (US 27) to KY 9 (AA Highway) and Thelma Lee Drive adjacent to the Village Green Shopping Center.

== History ==
Prior to the addition of the state designation on December 14, 1999, the route of KY 709 was originally known as the East Alexandria Connector.

The previous KY 709 was located in Laurel County. It ran from US 25E in Corbin to the Corbin Water Plant. This was renumbered KY 1783 by 1977, and that was decommissioned by 1981 and partially replaced by KY 770.

The original KY 709 was located in Logan County. It ran from KY 79 in Russellville east and south via 1st Street and Stevenson Mill Road to US 68 (at what is now KY 2369). The road was given to Logan County by 1959.

== Major intersections ==
The entire route is in Alexandria, Campbell County.

mi	km	Destinations	Notes
0.000	0.000	US 27 (Alexandria Pike)	Southern terminus
0.476	0.766	AA Hwy (KY 9) / Thelma Lee Drive	Northern terminus; continues as Thelma Lee Drive beyond KY 9 (AA Hwy.)
1.000 mi = 1.609 km; 1.000 km = 0.621 mi
