= Taylorsport, Kentucky =

Unincorporated community in Kentucky, United States

Coordinates: 39°05′59″N 84°41′36″W

Taylorsport is an unincorporated community in Boone County, Kentucky, in the United States.

== History ==
Founded in 1827 as a warehouse and ferry crossing at the mouth of Elijah's Creek marked the beginning of Taylorsport. In 1836, James Taylor Jr. of Campbell County established a ferry here and named the town after himself. Over the years, Taylorsport has lost a street, a row of houses, and a cemetery to the waters of the Ohio River.

== Geography ==
Taylorsport is just north of Interstate 275, Exit 6. Sayler Park is on the other side of the Ohio River, north of Taylorsport. This is where the ferry crossing from Taylorsport went. Kentucky Route 8 runs right through Taylorsport as well.

== Natural disasters ==
On April 3, 1974, a tornado hit Sayler Park, Ohio, dealing EF-4 level damage across the Ohio River in the Taylorsport area. It destroyed Morehead Marine Service, damaged 50 homes, 20 barns, and 186 boats, and killed 50 dairy cows in both communities.
