= Brayville, Kentucky =

Brayville is an unincorporated area of southern Campbell County, Kentucky, in the United States. It is located approximately 23 miles southeast of Cincinnati, Ohio.

The Brayville Post Office is catalogued as a postal office by the U.S. Board on Geographic Names, however the post office itself no longer exists. The current zip code for residents of Brayville is 41007 (California, Kentucky), although California is located approximately 12 miles from Brayville, along the Ohio River. Brayville itself is located high upon a hillside along Kentucky Highway 154 (also known as Peach Grove Road), providing sweeping views of southern Greater Cincinnati. Brayville has an elevation of approximately 869 feet (265 meters).

Brayville was also once home to the Brayville Saloon and Brayville School, which eventually closed after Grant's Lick Elementary was built in 1935.
