= Woodlawn, Kentucky =

- City
- Seal

- Location of Woodlawn in Campbell County, Kentucky.
- Coordinates: 39°05′27″N 84°28′22″W
- Country: United States
- State: Kentucky
- County: Campbell

Government
  - Type: Commission
  - Mayor: Corinne Rasche

Area
  - Total: 0.058 sq mi (0.15 km^{2})
  - Land: 0.058 sq mi (0.15 km^{2})
  - Water: 0 sq mi (0.00 km^{2})
- Elevation: 571 ft (174 m)

Population (2020)
  - Total: 212
  - Density: 3,606.2/sq mi (1,392.36/km^{2})
- Time zone: UTC-5 (Eastern (EST))
  - Summer (DST): UTC-4 (EDT)
- ZIP code: 41071
- Area code: 859
- FIPS code: 21-84522
- GNIS feature ID: 2405785
- Website: https://woodlawnky.gov/

Woodlawn is a home rule-class city in Campbell County, Kentucky, United States. The population was 212 at the 2020 census.

== History ==
Woodlawn was incorporated as a city October 17, 1922.

== Geography ==
Woodlawn is bordered to the north, west, and south by the city of Newport, and to the east and south by the city of Fort Thomas. Interstate 471 crosses the western end of Woodlawn and leads 2 miles (3 km) across the Ohio River into Cincinnati.

According to the United States Census Bureau, Woodlawn has a total area of 0.05 square miles (0.12 km^{2}), all land.

== Demographics ==
Historical population
Census	Pop.	Note	%±
1930	296		—
1940	294		−0.7%
1950	339		15.3%
1960	387		14.2%
1970	525		35.7%
1980	331		−37.0%
1990	308		−6.9%
2000	268		−13.0%
2010	229		−14.6%
2020	212		−7.4%
U.S. Decennial Census

As of the census of 2000, there were 268 people, 98 households, and 78 families residing in the city. The population density was 5,804,000.6 people per square mile (2,240,937.2 people/km^{2}). There were 101 housing units at an average density of 2,680 per square mile (1,030/km^{2}). The racial makeup of the city was 98.1% White, 0.4% African American, 0.4% Native American, 1.1% from other races. Hispanic or Latino of any race were 1.5% of the population.

There were 98 households, out of which 38.8% had children under the age of 18 living with them, 63.3% were married couples living together, 9.2% had a female householder with no husband present, and 20.4% were non-families. 17.3% of all households were made up of individuals, and 4.1% had someone living alone who was 65 years of age or older. The average household size was 2.73 and the average family size was 3.10.

In the city, the population was spread out, with 25.0% under the age of 18, 11.6% from 18 to 24, 31.0% from 25 to 44, 23.9% from 45 to 64, and 8.6% who were 65 years of age or older. The median age was 35 years. For every 100 females, there were 94.2 males. For every 100 females age 18 and over, there were 99.0 males.

The median income for a household in the city was $56,042, and the median income for a family was $58,571. Males had a median income of $36,250 versus $27,188 for females. The per capita income for the city was $20,888. About 1.4% of families and 3.1% of the population were below the poverty line, including 3.0% of those under the age of eighteen and none of those 65 or over.
