= Kentucky Route 154 =

State highway in Kentucky, United States

Kentucky Route 154

Route information
- Maintained by KYTC
- Length: 5.765 mi (9.278 km)

Major junctions
- West end: US 27 in rural Campbell Co
- AA Hwy (KY 9) in rural Pendleton Co
- East end: KY 8 in rural Pendleton Co

Location
- Country: United States
- State: Kentucky
- Counties: Pendleton

Highway system
- Kentucky State Highway System; Interstate; US; State; Parkways
← KY 153	→ KY 155

Kentucky Route 154 (KY 154) is a 5.765-mile-long (9.278 km) state highway in Campbell and Pendleton Counties, Kentucky. It runs from U.S. Route 27 (US 27) south of Claryville to KY 8 northwest of Foster.

== Major intersections ==
The entire route is in Pendleton County.

Location	mi	km	Destinations	Notes
	0.000	0.000	US 27	Western terminus
	0.730	1.175	KY 3162 west (Lock Road)	Eastern terminus of KY 3162
Peach Grove	2.371	3.816	KY 10 west	West end of KY 10 overlap
Peach Grove	2.455	3.951	KY 10 east	East end of KY 10 overlap
	4.573	7.360	AA Hwy (KY 9)	
	5.765	9.278	KY 8	Eastern terminus
1.000 mi = 1.609 km; 1.000 km = 0.621 mi: Concurrency terminus
