= Cumminsville, Kentucky =

Unincorporated community in Kentucky, United States

Cumminsville
- Unincorporated community
- Location within the state of Kentucky Cumminsville (the United States)
- Coordinates: 38°43′5″N 84°6′18″W
- Country: United States
- State: Kentucky
- County: Bracken
- Elevation: 682 ft (208 m)
- Time zone: UTC-5 (Eastern (EST))
  - Summer (DST): UTC-4 (EDT)
- GNIS feature ID: 507796

Cumminsville is an unincorporated community located in Bracken County, Kentucky, United States.
