= Kentucky Route 547 =

State highway in Kentucky, United States

Kentucky Route 547
- KY 547 highlighted in red

Route information
- Maintained by KYTC
- Length: 6.517 mi (10.488 km)

Major junctions
- South end: KY 10 (Main Street) in Alexandria
- North end: KY 8 (Mary Ingles Highway) in Silver Grove

Location
- Country: United States
- State: Kentucky
- Counties: Campbell

Highway system
- Kentucky State Highway System; Interstate; US; State; Parkways
| ← KY 545 | → KY 548 |

Kentucky Route 547 is a 6.517-mile (10.488 km) state highway that runs from KY-10 in Alexandria to KY-8 in Silver Grove. The entire route is in Campbell County.

== Major intersections ==
The entire route is in Campbell County.

| Location | mi | km | Destinations | Notes |
|---|---|---|---|---|
| Alexandria | 0.000 | 0.000 | KY 10 (East Main Street) | Southern terminus at KY-10 just east of its intersection with US-27 |
| Alexandria | 1.681 | 2.705 | To AA Hwy (KY 9) east / Riley Road | Ramp to/from KY-9 East on east side of KY-547; Riley Road on west side of intersection |
| Alexandria | 1.830 | 2.945 | Nelson Road To AA Hwy (KY 9) west | Nelson Road connects to the ramp to/from KY-9 West |
| Camp Springs | 2.932 | 4.719 | KY 1997 south (Stonehouse Road) | Northern terminus of KY-1997 |
| Silver Grove | 6.517 | 10.488 | KY 8 (Mary Ingles Highway) | Northern terminus |
1.000 mi = 1.609 km; 1.000 km = 0.621 mi
