= Quincy, Kentucky =

Unincorporated community in Kentucky, United States

- Unincorporated community
- Location within Kentucky Location within the United States
- Coordinates: 38°37′26″N 83°07′51″W
- Country: United States
- State: Kentucky
- County: Lewis
- Elevation: 541 ft (165 m)
- Time zone: UTC-5 (Eastern (EST))
  - Summer (DST): UTC-4 (EDT)
- ZIP code: 41166
- Area code: 606
- GNIS feature ID: 501486

Quincy is an unincorporated community in Lewis County, Kentucky, United States. The community is located on Kentucky Route 8 and the Ohio River 10.3 miles (16.6 km) east of Vanceburg. Quincy has a post office with ZIP code 41166.
