= Ribolt, Kentucky =

Unincorporated community in Kentucky, United States

Coordinates: 38°34′30″N 83°31′11″W

Ribolt is an unincorporated community in Lewis County, in the U.S. state of Kentucky.

== History ==
A post office called Ribolt was established in 1898, and remained in operation until 1936. The community was named for Ribolt Harrison, a town merchant.
