= Chatham, Kentucky =

Unincorporated community in Kentucky, United States

Chatham
- Unincorporated community
- Location within the state of Kentucky Chatham (the United States)
- Coordinates: 38°42′55″N 84°1′8″W
- Country: United States
- State: Kentucky
- County: Bracken
- Elevation: 935 ft (285 m)
- Time zone: UTC-5 (Eastern (EST))
  - Summer (DST): UTC-4 (EST)
- GNIS feature ID: 507688

Chatham is an unincorporated community located in Bracken County, Kentucky, United States.

== History ==
A post office called Chatham was established in 1871, and remained in operation until 1904. The community was most likely named after Chatham, New York.
