= Lenoxburg, Kentucky =

Unincorporated community in Kentucky, United States

- Unincorporated community
- Location within Kentucky Location within the United States
- Coordinates: 38°44′33″N 84°13′30″W
- Country: United States
- State: Kentucky
- County: Bracken, Pendleton
- Named for: Samuel B. Lenox
- Elevation: 922 ft (281 m)
- Time zone: UTC-5 (Eastern (EST))
  - Summer (DST): UTC-4 (EDT)
- GNIS feature ID: 496288

Lenoxburg is an unincorporated community in Bracken and Pendleton counties, in the U.S. state of Kentucky.

== History ==
A post office was established at Lenoxburg in 1874, and remained in operation until it was discontinued in 1906. The community was probably named for Samuel B. Lenox, a local merchant.
