= Johnsville, Kentucky =

Unincorporated community in Kentucky, United States

- Unincorporated community
- Location within Kentucky Location within the United States
- Coordinates: 38°45′12″N 84°8′54″W
- Country: United States
- State: Kentucky
- County: Bracken
- Elevation: 886 ft (270 m)
- Time zone: UTC-5 (Eastern (EST))
  - Summer (DST): UTC-4 (EDT)
- GNIS feature ID: 495435

Johnsville is an unincorporated community in Bracken County, in the U.S. state of Kentucky.

== History ==
A post office called Johnsville was established in 1879, and remained in operation until 1906. The community was named for two Messrs. John, the town merchants.
