= Bradford, Kentucky =

Unincorporated community in Kentucky, United States

Bradford
- Unincorporated community
- Location within the state of Kentucky Bradford (the United States)
- Coordinates: 38°47′6″N 84°8′44″W
- Country: United States
- State: Kentucky
- County: Bracken
- Elevation: 495 ft (151 m)
- Time zone: UTC-5 (Eastern (EST))
  - Summer (DST): UTC-4 (EDT)
- GNIS feature ID: 507569

Bradford is an unincorporated community located in Bracken County, Kentucky, United States.

== History ==
An early variant name was Metcalfe's Landing. A post office called Metcalfe's Landing was established in 1863, the name was changed to Bradford in 1866, and the post office closed in 1956. The present name honors Laban J. Bradford, a local businessman.
