= Brooksville, Kentucky =

- City
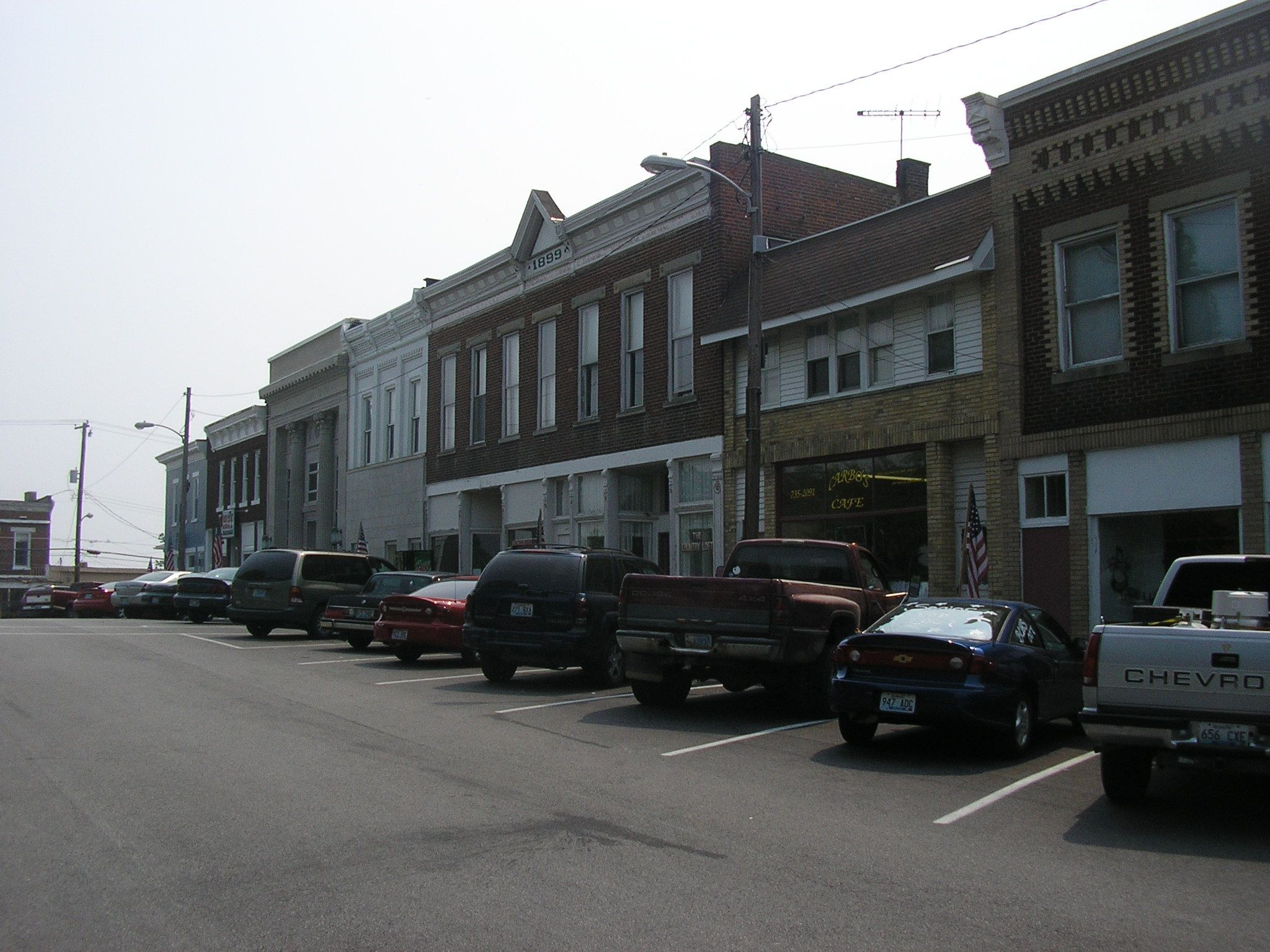
- Brooksville, Kentucky

- Location of Brooksville in Bracken County, Kentucky.
- Coordinates: 38°40′54″N 84°04′00″W
- Country: United States
- State: Kentucky
- County: Bracken

Area
  - Total: 0.47 sq mi (1.22 km^{2})
  - Land: 0.47 sq mi (1.22 km^{2})
  - Water: 0 sq mi (0.00 km^{2})
- Elevation: 912 ft (278 m)

Population (2020)
  - Total: 654
  - Density: 1,386.6/sq mi (535.38/km^{2})
- Time zone: UTC-5 (Eastern (EST))
  - Summer (DST): UTC-4 (EDT)
- ZIP code: 41004
- Area code: 606
- FIPS code: 21-10000
- GNIS feature ID: 2403935

Brooksville is a home rule-class city in Bracken County, Kentucky, in the United States. As of the 2020 census, Brooksville had a population of 654. It is the county seat of Bracken County.

The area was settled before 1800 by William and Joel Woodward and was originally known as Woodward's Crossroads. County government moved from Augusta to Woodward's Crossing in 1833 due to its more central location, although it did not become the official county seat until February 16, 1839. The legislation to formalize Woodward's Crossing as the county seat was sponsored by Senator David Brooks, and the town was renamed in his honor.

== Geography ==
Brooksville is located in central Bracken County. Kentucky Routes 10 and 19 join in Brooksville. Route 10 leads east 20 miles (32 km) to Maysville, and Route 19 leads northeast 9 miles (14 km) to Augusta; both destinations are on the Ohio River. The two highways head jointly out of town to the southwest from Brooksville.

According to the United States Census Bureau, the city has a total area of 0.46 square miles (1.2 km^{2}), all land.

== Demographics ==
Historical population
Census	Pop.	Note	%±
1860	262		—
1870	348		32.8%
1880	378		8.6%
1890	330		−12.7%
1900	565		71.2%
1910	492		−12.9%
1920	585		18.9%
1930	615		5.1%
1940	656		6.7%
1950	622		−5.2%
1960	601		−3.4%
1970	609		1.3%
1980	680		11.7%
1990	670		−1.5%
2000	589		−12.1%
2010	642		9.0%
2020	654		1.9%
U.S. Decennial Census

As of the census of 2000, there were 589 people, 261 households, and 163 families residing in the city. The population density was 1,025.3 inhabitants per square mile (395.9/km^{2}). There were 288 housing units at an average density of 501.3 per square mile (193.6/km^{2}). The racial makeup of the city was 98.81% White, 0.17% African American, 1.02% from other races. Hispanic or Latino of any race were 1.02% of the population.

There were 261 households, out of which 32.2% had children under the age of 18 living with them, 39.8% were married couples living together, 18.4% had a female householder with no husband present, and 37.5% were non-families. 35.2% of all households were made up of individuals, and 25.3% had someone living alone who was 65 years of age or older. The average household size was 2.26 and the average family size was 2.93.

The population was spread out, with 27.0% under the age of 18, 5.8% from 18 to 24, 25.6% from 25 to 44, 22.2% from 45 to 64, and 19.4% who were 65 years of age or older. The median age was 38 years. For every 100 females, there were 75.3 males. For every 100 females age 18 and over, there were 70.0 males.

The median income for a household in the city was $22,321, and the median income for a family was $36,875. Males had a median income of $27,308 versus $17,500 for females. The per capita income for the city was $13,457. About 18.0% of families and 19.6% of the population were below the poverty line, including 22.5% of those under age 18 and 32.7% of those age 65 or over.

== Education ==
- Taylor Elementary School
- Bracken County Middle School
- Bracken County High School

Brooksville has a lending library, the Bracken County Public Library.

== Notable people ==
- Don Galloway, actor best known for playing Detective Sergeant Ed Brown on Ironside
- Ed McClanahan, author and English professor
- Herb Moford, Major League Baseball player
