= Carntown, Kentucky =

Unincorporated community in Kentucky, United States

Coordinates: 38°50′17″N 84°14′28″W

Carntown is an unincorporated community in Pendleton County, in the U.S. state of Kentucky.

== History ==
A variant name was Motier. A post office called Motier was established in 1839, the name was changed to Carntown in 1891, and the post office closed in 1920. Jacob Carnes, one of the early postmasters, gave the community its present name.
