= Peach Grove, Kentucky =

Unincorporated community in Kentucky, United States

- Unincorporated community
- Location within Kentucky
- Coordinates: 38°49′51″N 84°17′27″W
- Country: United States
- State: Kentucky
- County: Pendleton
- Elevation: 889 ft (271 m)
- Time zone: UTC-5 (Eastern (EST))
  - Summer (DST): UTC-4 (EDT)
- Area code: 859
- GNIS feature ID: 508785

Peach Grove is an unincorporated community in Pendleton County, Kentucky, United States. Peach Grove is located at the junction of Kentucky Route 10 and Kentucky Route 154 in northeastern Pendleton County, 10.3 miles (16.6 km) south-southeast of Alexandria. Immaculate Conception Catholic Church and Cemetery, which is listed on the National Register of Historic Places, is located near Peach Grove.

== Notable residents ==
- Orie Solomon Ware, U.S. Representative from Kentucky
