= Campbell County, Kentucky =

County in Kentucky, United States

- County
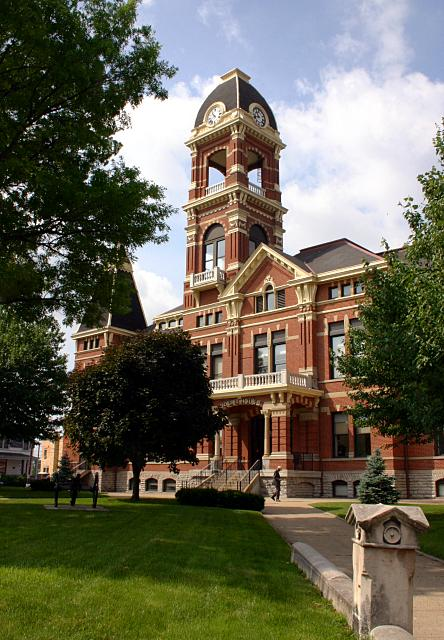
- The Campbell County Courthouse in Newport

- Location within the U.S. state of Kentucky
- Coordinates: 38°57′N 84°23′W
- Country: United States
- State: Kentucky
- Founded: December 17, 1794
- Named for: John Campbell
- Seat: Alexandria and Newport
- Largest city: Fort Thomas

Government
  - Judge/Executive: Steve Pendery (R)

Area
  - Total: 159 sq mi (410 km^{2})
  - Land: 151 sq mi (390 km^{2})
  - Water: 8.1 sq mi (21 km^{2}) 5.1%

Population (2020)
  - Total: 93,076
  - Estimate (2025): 95,441 ▲
  - Density: 616/sq mi (238/km^{2})
- Time zone: UTC−5 (Eastern)
  - Summer (DST): UTC−4 (EDT)
- Congressional district: 4th
- Website: www.campbellcountyky.gov

Campbell County is a county located in the northern part of the U.S. state of Kentucky. As of the 2020 census, the population was 93,076. Its county seats are Alexandria and Newport. The county was formed on December 17, 1794, from sections of Scott, Harrison, and Mason counties and was named for Colonel John Campbell (1735–1799), a Revolutionary War soldier and Kentucky legislator. Campbell County, with Boone and Kenton counties, is part of the Northern Kentucky metro community, and the Cincinnati-Middletown, OH-KY-IN Metropolitan Statistical Area.

== History ==
Campbell County was founded December 17, 1794, two years after the creation of the Commonwealth of Kentucky, becoming the state's 19th county. Campbell County was carved out of Scott, Harrison and Mason counties. The original county included all of present Boone, Kenton, Pendleton, and most of Bracken and Grant counties. Campbell County is named in honor of John Campbell, an Irish immigrant who was a soldier, explorer, statesman and one of the drafters of the Kentucky Constitution.

The first courthouse, built of logs, was replaced in 1815 by a brick structure. The present courthouse dates from 1884.

=== County seat ===
Wilmington, a pioneer settlement, was the original county seat of Campbell County from 1794 until 1797. The original justices in the Campbell County Court were John Roberts, Thomas Kennedy, Samuel Bryan, John Cook, James Little, Robert Benham and John Bush. Newport was designated as the county seat until 1823, when it was moved to Visalia, at that time closer to the geographical center of the county. This was an unpopular action, however, as the overwhelming majority of residents lived in the north, along the Ohio River. The county court returned to Newport in 1824 and remained there until 1840.

In 1840, Kenton County was created, primarily out of a significant portion of Campbell. The Kentucky General Assembly forced the county to move its seat to Alexandria, closer to the center of the new, smaller Campbell County. In 1883, after years of lobbying, the General Assembly established a special provision to allow Newport to designate a Court House District separate from the offices in Alexandria.

The special Courthouse Commission legislation led to the misconception that the county was dual seated, but Alexandria remained the sole de jure county seat. It was not until November 24, 2010, that a court ruling granted Newport equal status as a county seat.

== Geography ==
According to the United States Census Bureau, the county has a total area of 159 square miles (410 km^{2}), of which 151 square miles (390 km^{2}) is land and 8.1 square miles (21 km^{2}) (5.1%) is water. It is the fourth-smallest county in Kentucky by land area and fifth-smallest by total area. It lies along the Ohio and Licking Rivers.

=== Adjacent counties ===
- Hamilton County, Ohio (north)
- Clermont County, Ohio (east)
- Pendleton County (south)
- Kenton County (west)

=== Major highways ===
- I-275
- I-471
- US 27
- KY 8
- KY 9
- KY 10
- KY 154
- KY 536
- KY 547
- KY 824
- KY 915
- KY 1120
- KY 1121
- KY 1566
- KY 1632
- KY 1936
- KY 1996
- KY 1997
- KY 1998
- KY 2345
- KY 2376
- KY 2828
- KY 2921
- KY 2924

== Demographics ==
Historical population
Census	Pop.	Note	%±
1800	1,903		—
1810	3,473		82.5%
1820	7,022		102.2%
1830	9,883		40.7%
1840	5,214		−47.2%
1850	13,127		151.8%
1860	20,909		59.3%
1870	27,406		31.1%
1880	37,440		36.6%
1890	44,208		18.1%
1900	54,223		22.7%
1910	59,369		9.5%
1920	61,868		4.2%
1930	73,391		18.6%
1940	71,918		−2.0%
1950	76,196		5.9%
1960	86,803		13.9%
1970	88,704		2.2%
1980	83,317		−6.1%
1990	83,866		0.7%
2000	88,616		5.7%
2010	90,336		1.9%
2020	93,076		3.0%
2025 (est.)	95,441	▲	2.5%
U.S. Decennial Census; 1790-1960 1900-1990; 1990-2000 2010-2020

=== 2020 census ===
As of the 2020 census, the county had a population of 93,076. The median age was 38.5 years. 21.0% of residents were under the age of 18 and 16.5% of residents were 65 years of age or older. For every 100 females there were 96.0 males, and for every 100 females age 18 and over there were 94.2 males age 18 and over.

The racial makeup of the county was 89.6% White, 3.0% Black or African American, 0.2% American Indian and Alaska Native, 1.1% Asian, 0.0% Native Hawaiian and Pacific Islander, 1.2% from some other race, and 4.8% from two or more races. Hispanic or Latino residents of any race comprised 2.5% of the population.

82.9% of residents lived in urban areas, while 17.1% lived in rural areas.

There were 38,466 households in the county, of which 26.7% had children under the age of 18 living with them and 28.1% had a female householder with no spouse or partner present. About 32.0% of all households were made up of individuals and 11.7% had someone living alone who was 65 years of age or older.

There were 41,405 housing units, of which 7.1% were vacant. Among occupied housing units, 67.5% were owner-occupied and 32.5% were renter-occupied. The homeowner vacancy rate was 1.4% and the rental vacancy rate was 6.6%.

=== 2000 census ===
As of the census of 2000, there were 88,616 people, 34,742 households, and 23,103 families residing in the county. The population density was 585 per square mile (226/km^{2}). There were 36,898 housing units at an average density of 244 per square mile (94/km^{2}). The racial makeup of the county was 96.64% White, 1.57% Black or African American, 0.17% Native American, 0.54% Asian, 0.01% Pacific Islander, 0.31% from other races, and 0.76% from two or more races. 0.86% of the population were Hispanics or Latinos of any race.

There were 34,742 households, out of which 32.50% had children under the age of 18 living with them, 50.30% were married couples living together, 12.30% had a female householder with no husband present, and 33.50% were non-families. 28.60% of all households were made up of individuals, and 9.90% had someone living alone who was 65 years of age or older. The average household size was 2.49 and the average family size was 3.09.

The age distribution was 25.60% under 18, 9.80% from 18 to 24, 30.60% from 25 to 44, 21.30% from 45 to 64, and 12.60% who were 65 or older. The median age was 35 years. For every 100 females there were 93.20 males. For every 100 females age 18 and over, there were 89.10 males.

The median income for a household in the county was $41,903, and the median income for a family was $51,481. Males had a median income of $37,931 versus $27,646 for females. The per capita income for the county was $20,637. About 7.30% of families and 9.30% of the population were below the poverty line, including 12.20% of those under age 18 and 7.90% of those age 65 or over.

== Education ==
There are six school districts in Campbell County.

- Bellevue Independent Schools, Bellevue
- Campbell County Schools, Alexandria
- Dayton Independent Schools, Dayton
- Fort Thomas Independent Schools, Fort Thomas
- Newport Independent Schools, Newport
- Southgate Independent School District has but one PreK-8th school in it.

former

- Silver Grove Independent Schools, Silver Grove - merged with the Campbell County district on July 1, 2019.

Northern Kentucky University located in Highland Heights provides the area with access to higher education.

=== Public high schools ===
Students in the county attend one of 6 public and 2 parochial high schools.

=== Private high schools ===
- Roman Catholic Diocese of Covington
  - Bishop Brossart High School, Alexandria
  - Newport Central Catholic High School, Newport

== Communities ==
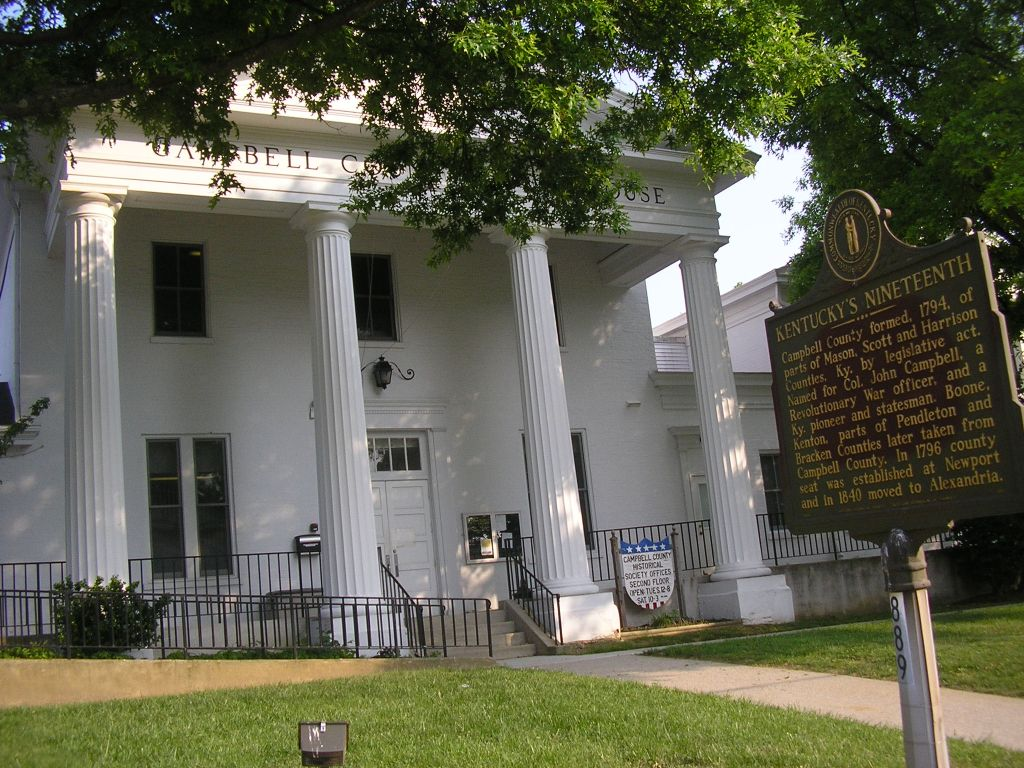
Campbell County Courthouse and county historical marker in Alexandria, Kentucky

=== Cities ===
- Alexandria (county seat)
- Bellevue
- California
- Cold Spring
- Crestview
- Dayton
- Fort Thomas
- Highland Heights
- Melbourne
- Mentor
- Newport (county seat)
- Silver Grove
- Southgate
- Wilder
- Woodlawn

=== Census-designated place ===
- Claryville

=== Other unincorporated places ===
- Brayville
- Camp Springs
- Oneonta - probably named after Oneonta, New York. Located midway between Ross and California, the settlement was conveniently located beside the Ohio River as a docking place for ferrying people and supplies especially from New Richmond, Ohio (once the largest and most flourishing village in Clermont County) toward Alexandria, Kentucky.

== Politics ==
United States presidential election results for Campbell County, Kentucky
Year	Republican		Democratic		Third party(ies)	
Year	No.	%	No.	%	No.	%
1912	2,276	20.88%	4,687	43.00%	3,937	36.12%
1916	5,696	41.90%	7,290	53.62%	609	4.48%
1920	12,210	50.93%	10,597	44.20%	1,169	4.88%
1924	12,329	49.44%	5,564	22.31%	7,043	28.24%
1928	17,317	54.25%	14,508	45.45%	95	0.30%
1932	11,665	38.62%	17,776	58.85%	767	2.54%
1936	10,327	34.20%	16,780	55.57%	3,089	10.23%
1940	14,916	50.02%	14,801	49.63%	103	0.35%
1944	13,647	51.17%	12,959	48.59%	64	0.24%
1948	11,851	46.29%	13,008	50.81%	744	2.91%
1952	17,705	57.64%	12,976	42.25%	35	0.11%
1956	18,617	63.82%	10,359	35.51%	195	0.67%
1960	17,388	54.21%	14,690	45.79%	0	0.00%
1964	12,209	43.20%	16,012	56.65%	43	0.15%
1968	13,681	48.51%	9,747	34.56%	4,775	16.93%
1972	20,025	68.01%	8,585	29.16%	835	2.84%
1976	15,798	54.81%	12,423	43.10%	600	2.08%
1980	16,743	57.32%	11,059	37.86%	1,406	4.81%
1984	21,473	69.99%	9,068	29.56%	138	0.45%
1988	19,387	66.61%	9,553	32.82%	164	0.56%
1992	16,382	49.88%	10,673	32.50%	5,785	17.62%
1996	16,640	53.31%	11,957	38.30%	2,619	8.39%
2000	20,789	61.45%	12,040	35.59%	1,000	2.96%
2004	25,540	63.57%	14,253	35.48%	382	0.95%
2008	24,046	59.67%	15,622	38.77%	629	1.56%
2012	24,240	60.33%	15,080	37.53%	857	2.13%
2016	25,050	58.93%	14,658	34.48%	2,802	6.59%
2020	28,482	58.27%	19,374	39.64%	1,022	2.09%
2024	28,450	58.86%	18,952	39.21%	932	1.93%

Politically, Campbell County is very Republican. In presidential elections it has only voted Democratic once since 1948.

The county voted "No" on 2022 Kentucky Amendment 2, an anti-abortion ballot measure, by 57% to 43%, and backed Donald Trump with 58% of the vote to Joe Biden's 40% in the 2020 presidential election. Trump beat Kamala Harris by an even more impressive margin, 59%-39%, in 2024.

=== Elected officials ===
Elected officials as of January 3, 2025
U.S. House	Thomas Massie (R)	KY 4
Ky. Senate	Shelley Funke Frommeyer (R)	24
Ky. House	Matthew Lehman (D)	67
Ky. House	Mike Clines (R)	68
Ky. House	Mark Hart (R)	78

== See also ==
- National Register of Historic Places listings in Campbell County, Kentucky
- St. Anne Woods and Wetlands, a conservation area along the Ohio River in Melbourne, Campbell County, Kentucky
