= Mentor, Kentucky =

- City
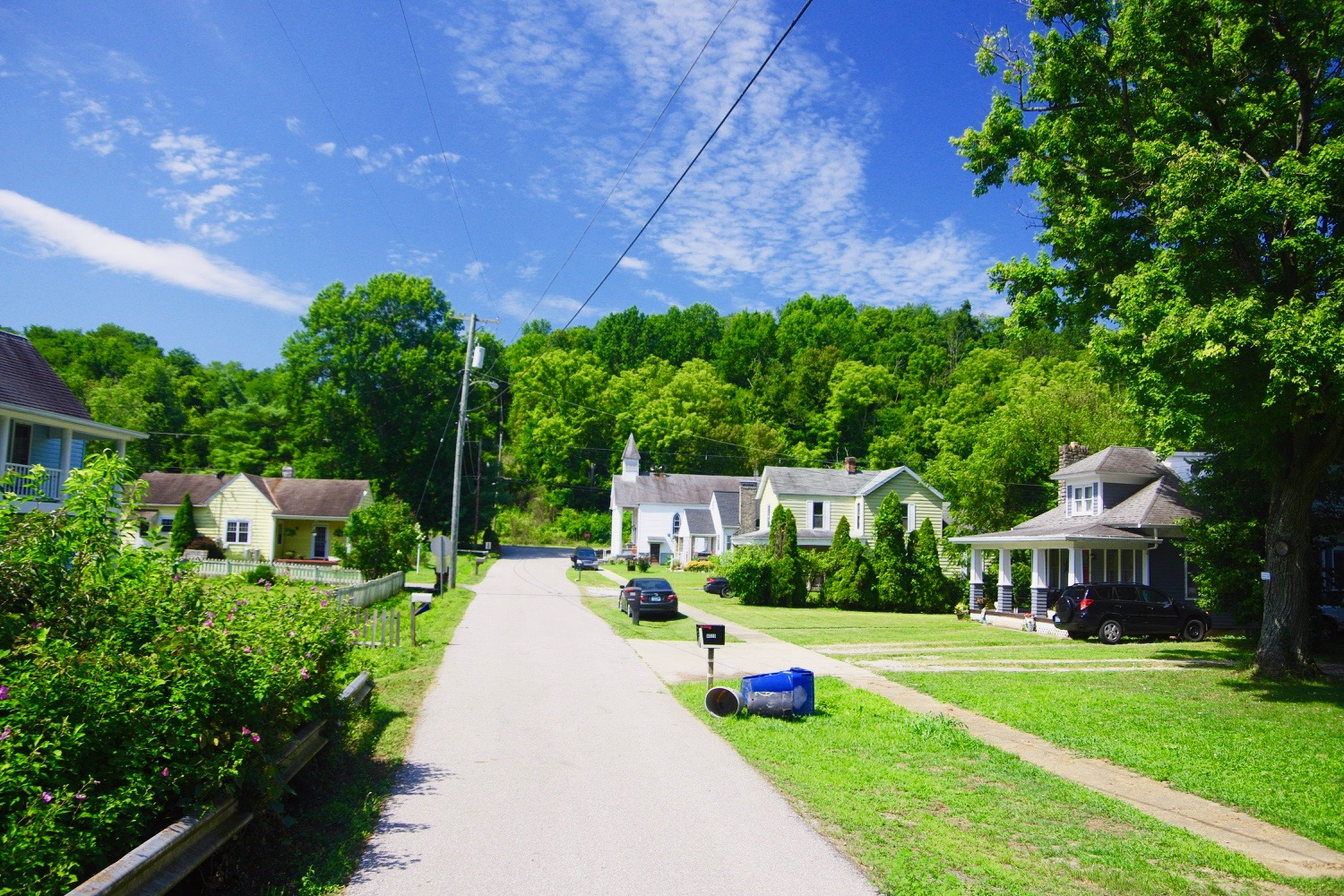
- Main Street

- Location of Mentor in Campbell County, Kentucky.
- Coordinates: 38°53′23″N 84°14′53″W
- Country: United States
- State: Kentucky
- County: Campbell
- Incorporated: 1957

Area
  - Total: 0.81 sq mi (2.09 km^{2})
  - Land: 0.75 sq mi (1.94 km^{2})
  - Water: 0.062 sq mi (0.16 km^{2})
- Elevation: 512 ft (156 m)

Population (2020)
  - Total: 218
  - Density: 291.8/sq mi (112.66/km^{2})
- Time zone: UTC-5 (Eastern (EST))
  - Summer (DST): UTC-4 (EDT)
- ZIP code: 41007
- Area code: 859
- FIPS code: 21-51564
- GNIS feature ID: 2404243

Mentor is a home rule-class city in Campbell County, Kentucky, United States. The population was 218 as of the 2020 census.

== Geography ==
According to the United States Census Bureau, the city has a total area of 0.6 square miles (1.6 km^{2}), of which 0.5 square miles (1.3 km^{2}) is land and 0.04 square miles (0.10 km^{2}) (7.02%) is water.

== Demographics ==
Historical population
Census	Pop.	Note	%±
1970	138		—
1980	169		22.5%
1990	169		0.0%
2000	181		7.1%
2010	193		6.6%
2020	218		13.0%
U.S. Decennial Census

As of the census of 2010, there were 193 people, 75 households, and 54 families residing in the city. The population density was 337.7 inhabitants per square mile (130.4/km^{2}). There were 73 housing units at an average density of 136.2 per square mile (52.6/km^{2}). The racial makeup of the city was 100.00% White. Hispanic or Latino of any race were 2.6% of the population.

There were 75 households, out of which 28.0% had children under the age of 18 living with them, 58.7% were married couples living together, 9.3% had a female householder with no husband present, and 28.0% were non-families. 24.0% of all households were made up of individuals, and 8.0% had someone living alone who was 65 years of age or older. The average household size was 2.57 and the average family size was 3.00.

In the city, the population was spread out, with 25.9% under the age of 18, 4.6% from 18 to 24, 25.9% from 25 to 44, 33.2% from 45 to 64, and 10.4% who were 65 years of age or older. The median age was 37.8 years. For every 100 females, there were 108.0 males. For every 100 females age 18 and over, there were 100.0 males.

The median income for a household in the city was $56,875, and the median income for a family was $55,938. Males had a median income of $44,000 versus $27,813 for females. The per capita income for the city was $24,245. About 3.8% of families and 1.8% of the population were below the poverty line, including none of those under the age of eighteen and 9.1% of those 65 or over.

== Education ==
Residents are within the Campbell County School District. Residents are zoned to Campbell County High School in Alexandria.
