= Bracken County, Kentucky =

County in Kentucky, United States

- County
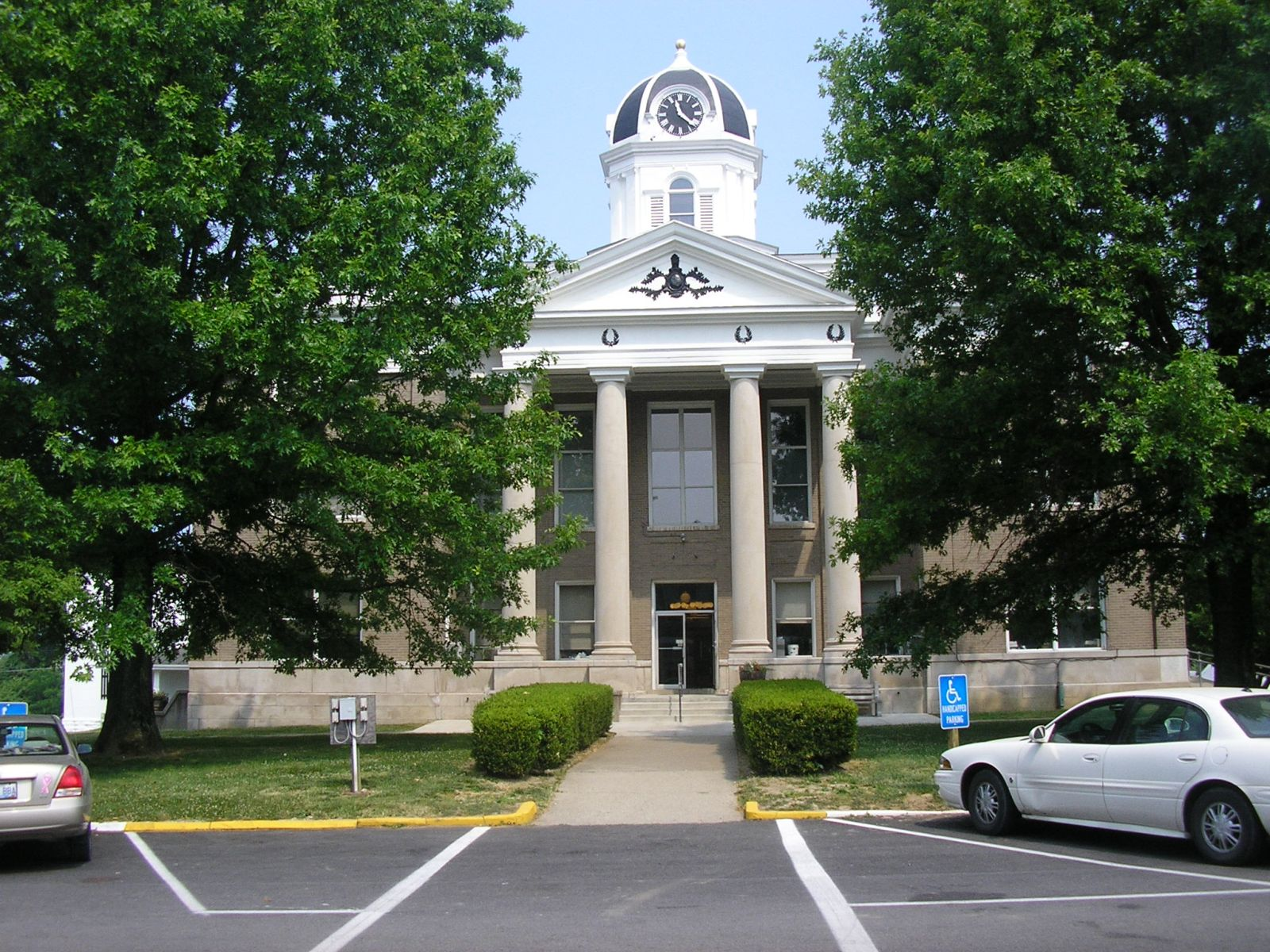
- Bracken County Courthouse in Brooksville

- Location within the U.S. state of Kentucky
- Coordinates: 38°41′N 84°05′W
- Country: United States
- State: Kentucky
- Founded: 1796
- Named for: William Bracken
- Seat: Brooksville
- Largest city: Augusta

Government
  - Judge/Executive: Tina Teegarden (D)

Area
  - Total: 209 sq mi (540 km^{2})
  - Land: 206 sq mi (530 km^{2})
  - Water: 3.3 sq mi (8.5 km^{2}) 1.6%

Population (2020)
  - Total: 8,400
  - Estimate (2025): 8,511 ▲
  - Density: 41/sq mi (16/km^{2})
- Time zone: UTC−5 (Eastern)
  - Summer (DST): UTC−4 (EDT)
- Congressional district: 4th
- Website: brackencounty.ky.gov

Bracken County is a county located in the U.S. state of Kentucky. As of the 2020 census, the population was 8,400. Its county seat is Brooksville. The county was formed in 1796. Bracken County is included in the Cincinnati-Middletown, OH-KY-IN Metropolitan Statistical Area.

== History ==
Bracken County was organized as Kentucky's 23rd county in 1796 from parts of Mason and Campbell counties. It was named after two creeks, the Big and Little Bracken, which in turn were named for William Bracken, an 18th-century explorer and surveyor who visited the area in 1773. He was later killed by Indians during the Northwest Indian War. The county originally extended to southern Nicholas County, north to the Ohio River, west to the Licking River and east to Dover, Kentucky.

Several early settlers were veterans of the American Revolutionary War, including Captain Abner Howell, who brought his family from Pennsylvania. He died in Bracken County in 1797.

The county government moved from Augusta to Woodward's Crossing (now Brooksville) in 1833.

Bracken was the birthplace of John Gregg Fee, founder of Berea College and Kentucky's most noted abolitionist. He was a graduate of Augusta College and Lane Theological Seminary. In 1822 Augusta College was founded as the first Methodist college in the world.

Anti-slavery activists in Bracken County played a major role in the movement known as the Underground Railroad. There are several Underground Railroad sites in the Augusta area. A network of citizens sympathetic to escaping slaves helped them cross the Ohio River to nearby Ripley, Ohio and other points north.

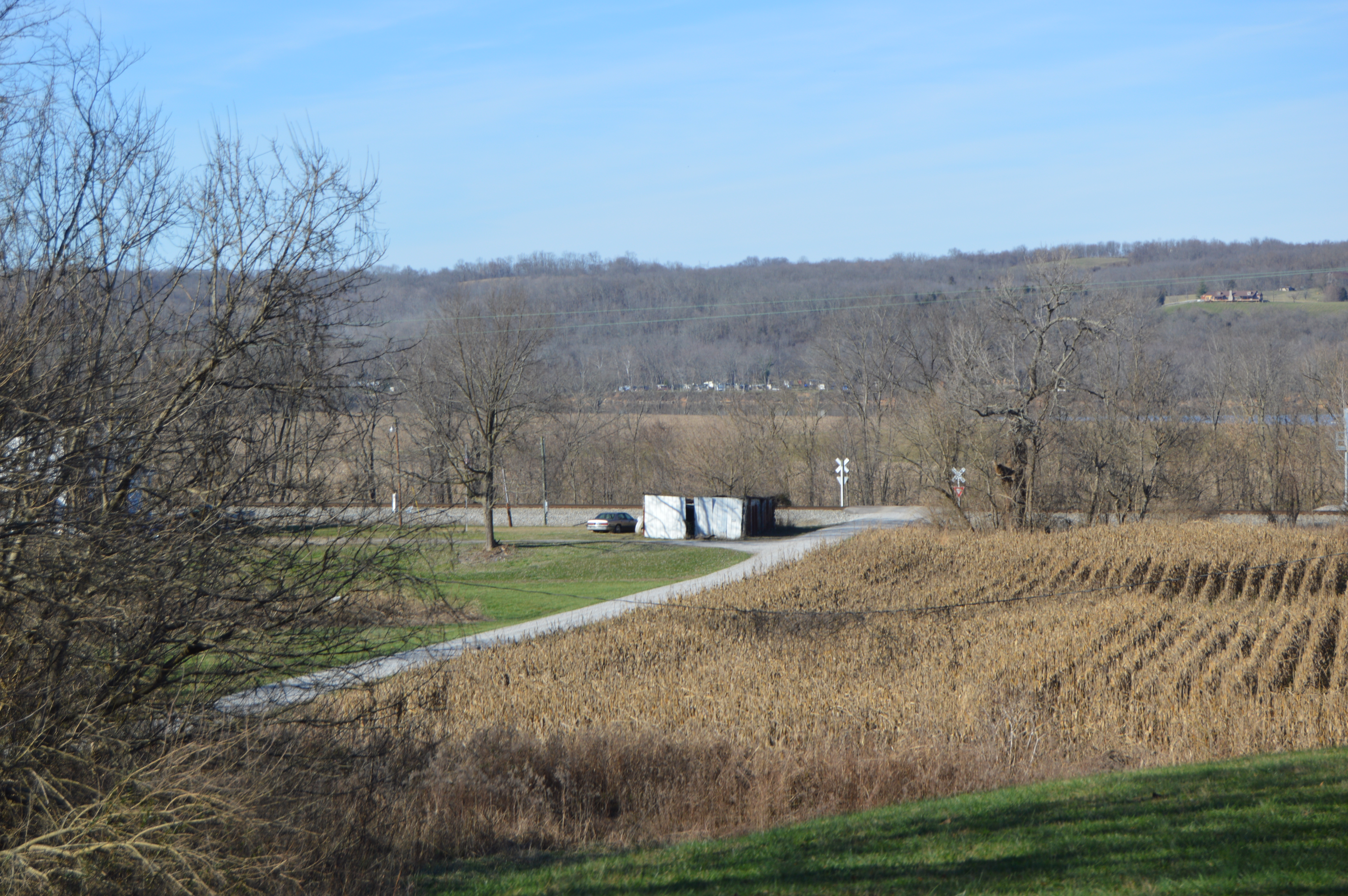
Fields at the George Barkley Farm in Bracken County, Kentucky, where Webb and Fore obtained the first white burley seed

Bracken County's economy was largely agricultural. Its chief crops before the Civil War were tobacco and corn. White burley tobacco, a light, adaptable leaf that revolutionized the industry, was first sold at the 1867 St. Louis Fair by the farmer Mr. Webb from Higginsport, Ohio. He had produced it in 1864 from Bracken County seed and developed the type. It became a major product of central Kentucky and central Tennessee.

Agriculture remains vital to the economy, with farms occupying 83.8 percent of the land area in 1982. Commodities include wheat, hay, and milk. Burley tobacco production in 1988 amounted to 5,406,000 pounds. Agricultural receipts in 1986 totaled $19,158,000 (~$46.4 million in 2024).

=== Historic schools ===
Augusta:

- Bracken Academy
- Augusta Methodist College

Brooksville:

- Saint James Elementary and High School

Germantown:

- Germantown College

Milford:

- Milford Graded and High School

== Politics ==
United States presidential election results for Bracken County, Kentucky
Year	Republican		Democratic		Third party(ies)	
Year	No.	%	No.	%	No.	%
1912	693	29.18%	1,315	55.37%	367	15.45%
1916	1,082	38.33%	1,676	59.37%	65	2.30%
1920	1,791	40.09%	2,621	58.66%	56	1.25%
1924	1,779	51.67%	1,485	43.13%	179	5.20%
1928	2,820	69.98%	1,201	29.80%	9	0.22%
1932	1,471	37.52%	2,407	61.39%	43	1.10%
1936	1,436	41.70%	1,956	56.79%	52	1.51%
1940	1,551	44.05%	1,961	55.69%	9	0.26%
1944	1,483	43.40%	1,915	56.04%	19	0.56%
1948	1,239	39.13%	1,863	58.84%	64	2.02%
1952	1,690	49.07%	1,753	50.90%	1	0.03%
1956	1,754	53.54%	1,515	46.25%	7	0.21%
1960	2,002	60.16%	1,326	39.84%	0	0.00%
1964	861	30.54%	1,958	69.46%	0	0.00%
1968	1,115	40.81%	1,067	39.06%	550	20.13%
1972	1,628	64.30%	873	34.48%	31	1.22%
1976	879	35.23%	1,577	63.21%	39	1.56%
1980	1,154	43.65%	1,420	53.71%	70	2.65%
1984	1,812	60.89%	1,136	38.17%	28	0.94%
1988	1,630	57.72%	1,176	41.64%	18	0.64%
1992	1,162	39.63%	1,259	42.94%	511	17.43%
1996	1,371	50.40%	1,055	38.79%	294	10.81%
2000	2,065	68.40%	888	29.41%	66	2.19%
2004	2,363	65.46%	1,213	33.60%	34	0.94%
2008	2,066	60.78%	1,241	36.51%	92	2.71%
2012	2,029	62.78%	1,147	35.49%	56	1.73%
2016	2,711	76.86%	705	19.99%	111	3.15%
2020	3,398	80.03%	800	18.84%	48	1.13%
2024	3,399	81.84%	702	16.90%	52	1.25%

=== Elected officials ===
Elected officials as of January 3, 2025
U.S. House	Thomas Massie (R)	KY 4
Ky. Senate	Shelley Funke Frommeyer (R)	24
Ky. House	William Lawrence (R)	70

=== Judge/Executives ===
- Tina Teegarden (2019–present)
- Earl Bush (2011–2019)
- Gary Riggs (2007–2011)
- Leslie Newman (2003–2007)
- Dwayne "Pie" Jett (1982–2003)

== Geography ==
According to the U.S. Census Bureau, the county has a total area of 209 square miles (540 km^{2}), of which 206 square miles (530 km^{2}) is land and 3.3 square miles (8.5 km^{2}) (1.6%) is water.

=== Adjacent counties ===
- Clermont County, Ohio (north – across the Ohio River)
- Brown County, Ohio (northeast – across the Ohio River)
- Mason County (east)
- Robertson County (south)
- Harrison County (southwest)
- Pendleton County (west)

== Demographics ==
Historical population
Census	Pop.	Note	%±
1800	2,606		—
1810	3,706		42.2%
1820	5,280		42.5%
1830	6,518		23.4%
1840	7,053		8.2%
1850	8,903		26.2%
1860	11,021		23.8%
1870	11,409		3.5%
1880	13,509		18.4%
1890	12,369		−8.4%
1900	12,137		−1.9%
1910	10,308		−15.1%
1920	10,210		−1.0%
1930	9,616		−5.8%
1940	9,389		−2.4%
1950	8,424		−10.3%
1960	7,422		−11.9%
1970	7,227		−2.6%
1980	7,738		7.1%
1990	7,766		0.4%
2000	8,279		6.6%
2010	8,488		2.5%
2020	8,400		−1.0%
2025 (est.)	8,511	▲	1.3%
U.S. Decennial Census; 1790-1960 1900-1990; 1990-2000 2010-2021

=== 2020 census ===
As of the 2020 census, the county had a population of 8,400. The median age was 41.8 years. 24.3% of residents were under the age of 18 and 17.8% of residents were 65 years of age or older. For every 100 females there were 102.1 males, and for every 100 females age 18 and over there were 99.6 males age 18 and over.

The racial makeup of the county was 95.2% White, 0.6% Black or African American, 0.2% American Indian and Alaska Native, 0.2% Asian, 0.0% Native Hawaiian and Pacific Islander, 0.4% from some other race, and 3.5% from two or more races. Hispanic or Latino residents of any race comprised 1.1% of the population.

0.0% of residents lived in urban areas, while 100.0% lived in rural areas.

There were 3,329 households in the county, of which 30.9% had children under the age of 18 living with them and 23.0% had a female householder with no spouse or partner present. About 26.6% of all households were made up of individuals and 12.9% had someone living alone who was 65 years of age or older.

There were 3,839 housing units, of which 13.3% were vacant. Among occupied housing units, 75.0% were owner-occupied and 25.0% were renter-occupied. The homeowner vacancy rate was 1.6% and the rental vacancy rate was 9.0%.

=== 2000 census ===
As of the census of 2000, there were 8,279 people, 3,228 households, and 2,346 families residing in the county. The population density was 41 per square mile (16/km^{2}). There were 3,715 housing units at an average density of 18 per square mile (6.9/km^{2}). The racial makeup of the county was 98.48% White, 0.62% Black or African American, 0.25% Native American, 0.06% Asian, 0.04% Pacific Islander, 0.21% from other races, and 0.35% from two or more races. 0.47% of the population were Hispanic or Latino of any race.

There were 3,228 households, out of which 33.50% had children under the age of 18 living with them, 57.30% were married couples living together, 10.70% had a female householder with no husband present, and 27.30% were non-families. 23.90% of all households were made up of individuals, and 11.30% had someone living alone who was 65 years of age or older. The average household size was 2.55 and the average family size was 3.00.

In the county, the population was spread out, with 25.50% under the age of 18, 8.40% from 18 to 24, 29.50% from 25 to 44, 23.00% from 45 to 64, and 13.50% who were 65 years of age or older. The median age was 37 years. For every 100 females, there were 98.00 males. For every 100 females age 18 and over, there were 95.90 males.

The median income for a household in the county was $34,823, and the median income for a family was $40,469. Males had a median income of $31,503 versus $21,139 for females. The per capita income for the county was $16,478. About 7.60% of families and 10.80% of the population were below the poverty line, including 10.50% of those under age 18 and 17.30% of those age 65 or over.

== Education ==
School districts include:

- Augusta Independent Schools in Augusta
- Bracken County Schools in Brooksville

== Communities ==
=== Cities ===
- Augusta
- Brooksville (county seat)
- Germantown

=== Unincorporated communities ===
- Foster
- Berlin

== Notable residents ==
- George Clooney, actor and son of Nick Clooney, grew up in Augusta and went to high school there.
- Nick Clooney, a Cincinnati journalist and former news anchor, and his wife Nina live in Augusta.
- Rosemary Clooney, singer and actress, lived in Augusta. Her most notable film was White Christmas.
- John Gregg Fee, minister and educator, born in Bracken County. Founder of Berea College.
- Don Galloway, television actor best known for playing Detective Sergeant Ed Brown on the 1960s TV series Ironside.
- Heather French Henry, Miss America 2000, was born in Augusta. Heather and her husband, former Kentucky Lt. Governor Steve Henry, are the curators of the Rosemary Clooney Museum in Augusta.
- Herb Moford, baseball pitcher who played at Brooksville High School, where he graduated in 1946. He pitched the first game in franchise history for the New York Mets.

== See also ==
- National Register of Historic Places listings in Bracken County, Kentucky
