= Kentucky Route 344 =

State highway in Kentucky, United States

Kentucky Route 344
- KY 344 highlighted in red

Route information
- Maintained by KYTC
- Length: 20.920 mi (33.667 km)

Major junctions
- West end: KY 57 northeast of Mount Carmel
- KY 989 in Pleasureville; KY 559 in Petersville; KY 377 near Stricklett
- To: KY 59 in Kinniconick

Location
- Country: United States
- State: Kentucky
- Counties: Fleming, Lewis

Highway system
- Kentucky State Highway System; Interstate; US; State; Parkways
← KY 343	→ KY 345

Kentucky Route 344 (KY 344) is a 20.920-mile-long (33.667 km) state highway in the U.S. state of Kentucky. The highway travels through mostly rural areas of Fleming and Lewis counties.

== Route description ==
=== Fleming County ===
KY 344 begins at an intersection with KY 57 northeast of Mount Carmel, within Fleming County. It travels to the northeast and curves to the southeast. It crosses over Trotters Creek and passes Foxport Cemetery before it enters Pleasureville, where it intersects the southern terminus of KY 989. It enters Foxport, where it intersects the northern terminus of KY 1902 (Pleasant Valley Road). It then crosses over the North Fork Licking River. Just after this bridge, it marks the Lewis County line.

=== Lewis County ===
KY 344 crosses over the North Fork Licking River and curves to the east-northeast. The highway curves to the south-southeast and crosses over Mud Lick Branch. It intersects the southern terminus of KY 3310 (Toller Bridge Road), passes Esham Cemetery, and then begins paralleling Dunaway Branch. It curves to the east-southeast and enters Petersville, where it intersects the eastern terminus of KY 559, curves to the northeast, leaves Dunaway Branch, and begins paralleling Kinniconick Creek. The highway crosses over Rock Camp Branch. It then crosses over Paint Lick Branch, curves to the east-northeast, and crosses over Burnt Cabin Branch. It travels through Crum and passes McEldowney Cemetery just before crossing over Black Lick Branch. It then crosses over Elk Lick, Long, Trumstock, and Bear branches before it curves to the east-southeast. The highway then has an intersection with the northern terminus of KY 377. It then curves to the north-northwest. KY 344 curves to the northeast and crosses over Holly Branch. It curves to the east-southeast and enters Kinniconick, where it meets its eastern terminus, an intersection with KY 59 (Fairlane Drive).

== History ==
KY 344 was formed between 1973 and 1976 as a renumbering of part of KY 24 because of I-24.

The original KY 344 ran from KY 106 southwest to KY 181 near Elkton. This became part of KY 106 by 1973, while the old route of KY 106 northwest to Kirkmansville became an extension of KY 171.

== Major intersections ==
County	Location	mi	km	Destinations	Notes
Fleming		0.000	0.000	KY 57	Western terminus
Fleming	Pleasureville	1.600	2.575	KY 989 north	Southern terminus of KY 989
Fleming	Foxport	2.238	3.602	KY 1902 south (Pleasant Valley Road)	Northern terminus of KY 1902
Lewis		6.611	10.639	KY 3310 north (Toller Bridge Road)	Southern terminus of KY 3310
Lewis	Petersville	9.014	14.507	KY 559 west	Western terminus of KY 559
Lewis		16.247	26.147	KY 377 south	Northern terminus of KY 377
Lewis	Kinniconick	20.920	33.667	KY 59 (Fairlane Drive)	Eastern terminus
1.000 mi = 1.609 km; 1.000 km = 0.621 mi
