= Protestant theologies =

Doctrines held by various Protestant traditions

Protestant theology refers to the doctrines held by various Protestant traditions, which share some things in common but differ in others. In general, Protestant theology, as a subset of Christian theology, holds to faith in the Christian Bible, the Holy Trinity, salvation, sanctification, charity, evangelism, and the four last things.

Various Protestant denominations differ in their doctrine, with churches teaching either Wesleyan-Arminian theology, Reformed theology, or Baptist theology. Other evangelical bodies, such as the Lutheran Church–Missouri Synod, Presbyterian Church in America and the Evangelical Friends Church International may subscribe to what they see as the orthodox theology espoused by their historic tradition, such as Lutheranism, Presbyterianism or Quakerism respectively.

== Teaching by denomination ==
=== Anabaptist theology ===
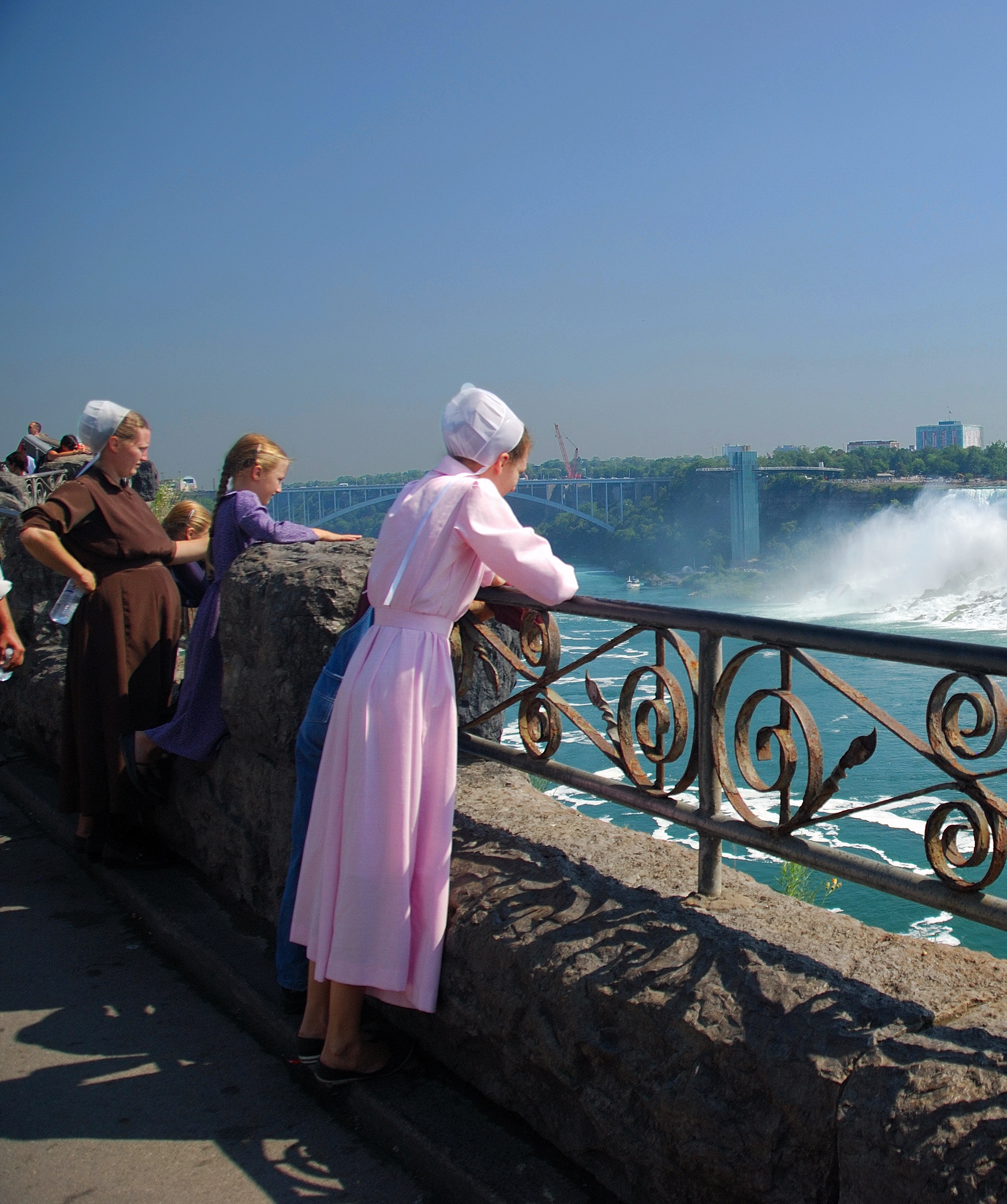
A Conservative Anabaptist lady wearing a cape dress and headcovering

Mennonite Anabaptist beliefs were formulated in the Dordrecht Confession of Faith in 1632. Seven ordinances have been taught in many Conservative Mennonite churches, which include "baptism, communion, footwashing, marriage, anointing with oil, the holy kiss, and the prayer covering."

After becoming a believer, Anabaptist theology emphasizes "a faith that works." Anabaptist denominations teach:

... salvation by faith through grace, but such faith must bear “visible fruit in repentance, conversion, regeneration, obedience, and a new life dedicated to the love of God and the neighbor, by the power of the Holy Spirit.”

Obedience to Jesus and other New Testament teachings, loving one another and being at peace with others, and walking in holiness are seen as "earmarks of the saved." Good works thus have an important role in the life of an Anabaptist believer, with the teaching "that faith without works is a dead faith" (cf. James 2:26) occupying a cornerstone in Anabaptist Christianity. Anabaptists teach that in the believer, "justification begun a dynamic process by which the believer partook of the nature of Christ and was so enabled to live increasingly like Jesus." Christians of the Anabaptist tradition (who teach salvation by "faith that works") have argued that being a disciple of Jesus by careful obedience to New Testament commands (such as the holy kiss, baptism, communion, headcovering, and feet washing), is "crucial evidence that an individual has repented, believed, and yielded to Christ."

=== Baptist theology ===
Baptists are those Christians who believe in credobaptism—that one should receive the ordinance of baptism after he/she experiences the New Birth. Baptists are categorized into two major categories: General Baptists (also known as Freewill Baptists) believe that Christ's atonement extends to all people, while the Particular Baptists (also known as Reformed Baptists) believe that it extends only to the elect. When the holiness movement came into being, some General Baptists accepted the teaching of a second work of grace and formed denominations that emphasized this belief, such as the Ohio Valley Association of the Christian Baptist Churches of God and the Holiness Baptist Association.

The doctrine of Baptist successionism (also known as Landmarkism), which has been influential among many Baptists, "argue[s] that their history can be traced across the centuries to New Testament times" and "claim[s] that Baptists have represented the true church" that "has been, present in every period of history". Baptists who uphold this ecclesiology also do not characterize themselves as being a Protestant Church due to their belief that "they did not descend from those churches that broke away in protest from the church of Rome. Rather, they had enjoyed a continuous historical existence from the time of the very first church in the New Testament days."

=== Keswickian theology ===
Keswickian theology, which emerged in the Higher Life Movement, teaches a second work of grace that occurs through "surrender and faith", in which God keeps an individual from sin. Keswickian denominations, such as the Christian and Missionary Alliance, differ from the Wesleyan-Holiness movement in that the Christian and Missionary Alliance does not see entire sanctification as cleansing one from original sin, whereas holiness denominations espousing the Wesleyan-Arminian theology affirm this belief.

=== Lutheran theology ===
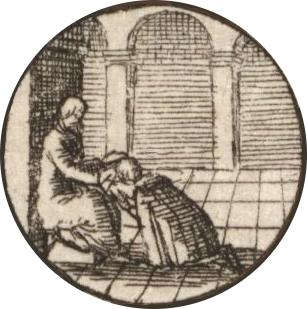
"Private Absolution ought to be retained in the churches, although in confession an enumeration of all sins is not necessary." —Augsburg Confession, Article 11

Evangelical Lutheranism arose out of the Protestant Reformation, heralding the doctrine of justification by faith, which teaches that humans are accounted as being righteous through the merits of Jesus' sacrifice on the cross. This gift of faith is received in baptism, which regenerates the soul, according to Lutheran theology.

In total, Lutherans affirm three sacraments: baptism, eucharist, as well as confession and absolution. With respect to worship, the predominant rite used by the Lutheran churches is a Western one based on the Formula missae ("Form of the Mass") although other Lutheran liturgies are also in use, such as those used in the Byzantine Rite Lutheran churches, such as the Ukrainian Lutheran Church and Evangelical Church of the Augsburg Confession in Slovenia.

The Augsburg Confession, a Lutheran statement of belief contained in the Book of Concord, teaches that "the faith as confessed by Luther and his followers is nothing new, but the true catholic faith, and that their churches represent the true catholic or universal church". When the Lutherans presented the Augsburg Confession to Charles V, Holy Roman Emperor, they believe to have "showed that each article of faith and practice was true first of all to Holy Scripture, and then also to the teaching of the church fathers and the councils".

Lutherans teach the real presence of Christ in the Eucharist in their doctrine of the sacramental union.

The Blessed Virgin Mary is held in high esteem by Lutherans, who universally teach the dogmas of the Theotokos and the Virgin Birth, with many also holding to the perpetual virginity of Mary.

=== Methodist theology ===
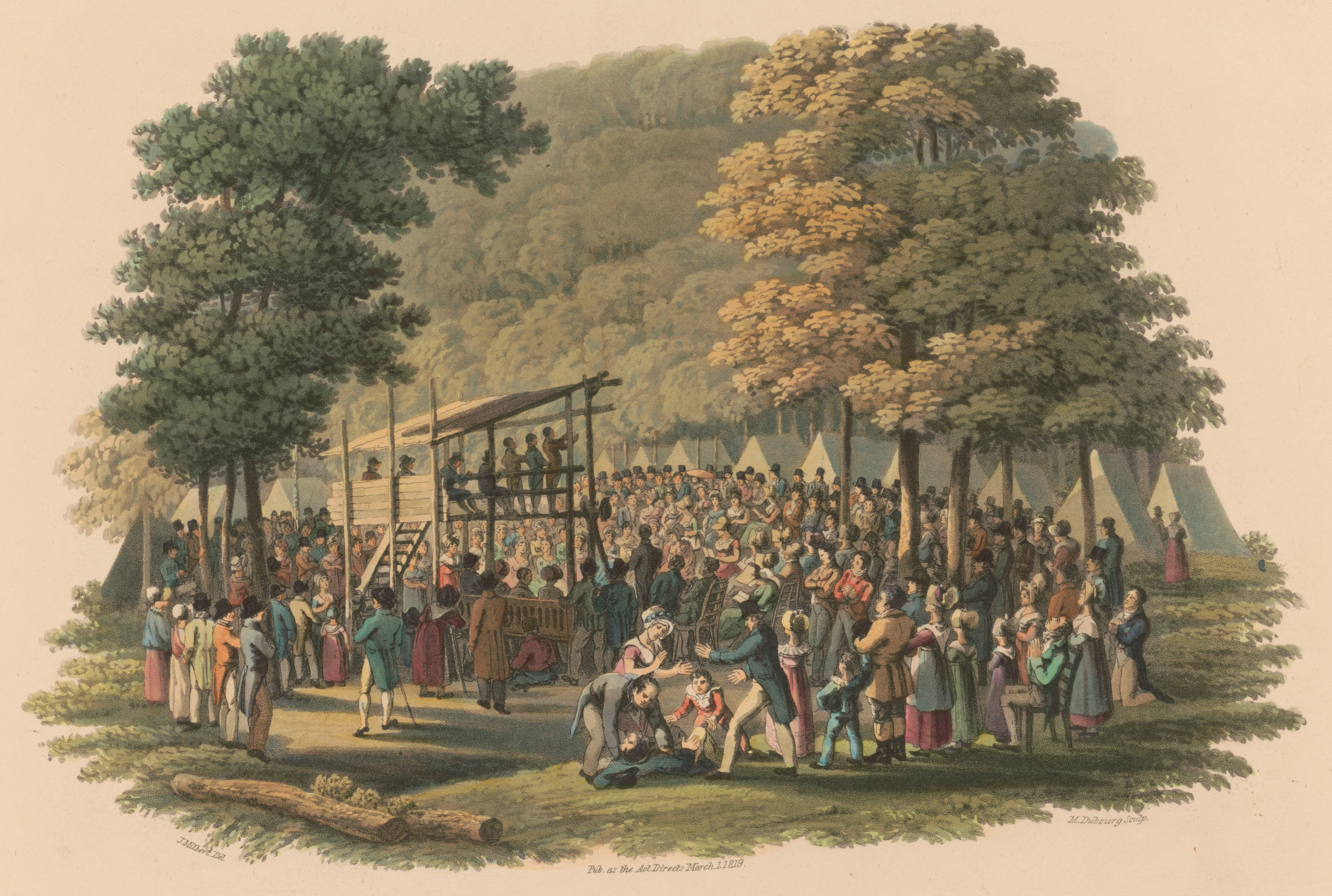
Methodist preachers are known for promulgating the doctrines of the new birth and entire sanctification to the public at events such as tent revivals and camp meetings, which they believe is the reason that God raised them up into existence.

Methodist theology (also known as Wesleyan-Arminian theology) holds that God was sent to earth in the form of Jesus Christ to redeem all of mankind. Individuals experience justification in the New Birth and then move on to sanctification, the experience in which they are made holy. Good works, for Methodists, play an important role in sanctification, especially a careful keeping of the Ten Commandments, as well as practicing the Works of Piety and the Works of Mercy. Thus, in addition to the heralding the kerygma through evangelism, Methodists have advanced the Social Gospel through the establishment of hospitals, orphanages, soup kitchens, and schools to follow Christ's command to spread the good news and serve all people. Methodists believe that they can have an assurance of faith.

With regard to sources on doctrine, Methodist theology teaches prima scriptura in the form of the Wesleyan Quadrilateral, which maintains that Scripture is to be the primary authority for the Church, with reason, personal experience, and Church tradition also being used to develop doctrine insofar as they agree with the Bible.

Covenant theology is taught by the Methodist churches: the covenant of grace was administered through "promises, prophecies, sacrifices, and at last by circumcision" during the patriarchal ages and through "the paschal lamb, the scape goat, [and] the priesthood of Aaron" under Mosaic Law. Under the Gospel, the covenant of grace is mediated through the greater sacraments, baptism and the Lord's Supper. In the Methodist churches, baptism is a sacrament of initiation into the visible Church. Wesleyan covenant theology further teaches that baptism is a sign and a seal of the covenant of grace:

Of this great new-covenant blessing, baptism was therefore eminently the sign; and it represented "the pouring out" of the Spirit, "the descending" of the Spirit, the "falling" of the Spirit "upon men," by the mode in which it was administered, the pouring of water from above upon the subjects baptized. As a seal, also, or confirming sign, baptism answers to circumcision.

Methodism teaches the real presence of Christ in the Eucharist, while allowing the details of how Christ is made manifest in the sacrament of Holy Communion to be a mystery.

Methodists give honour to the saints and martyrs by trying to live their example and dedicating churches to them; many Methodists practice prayer for the dead.

=== Moravian theology ===
The Moravian Church teaches the necessity of the New Birth, piety, evangelism (especially missionary work), and doing good works. As such, the Moravian Brethren hold strongly that Christianity is a religion of the heart. It emphasizes the "greatness of Christ" and holds the Bible to be the "source of all religious truths". With regard to the New Birth, the Moravian Church holds that a personal conversion to Christianity is a joyful experience, in which the individual "accepts Christ as Lord" after which faith "daily grows inside the person." For Moravians, "Christ lived as a man because he wanted to provide a blueprint for future generations" and "a converted person could attempt to live in his image and daily become more like Jesus."

The Moravian Church historically adheres to the position of Christian pacifism, evidenced in atrocities such as the Gnadenhutten massacre, where the Moravian Christian Indian Martyrs practiced nonresistance, singing hymns and praying to God until their execution.

Nicolaus Zinzendorf, a bishop of the Moravian Church, stated that Holy Communion is the "most intimate of all connection with the person of the Saviour." The Moravian Church adheres to a view known as the sacramental presence of Christ in the Eucharist.

=== Pentecostal theology ===
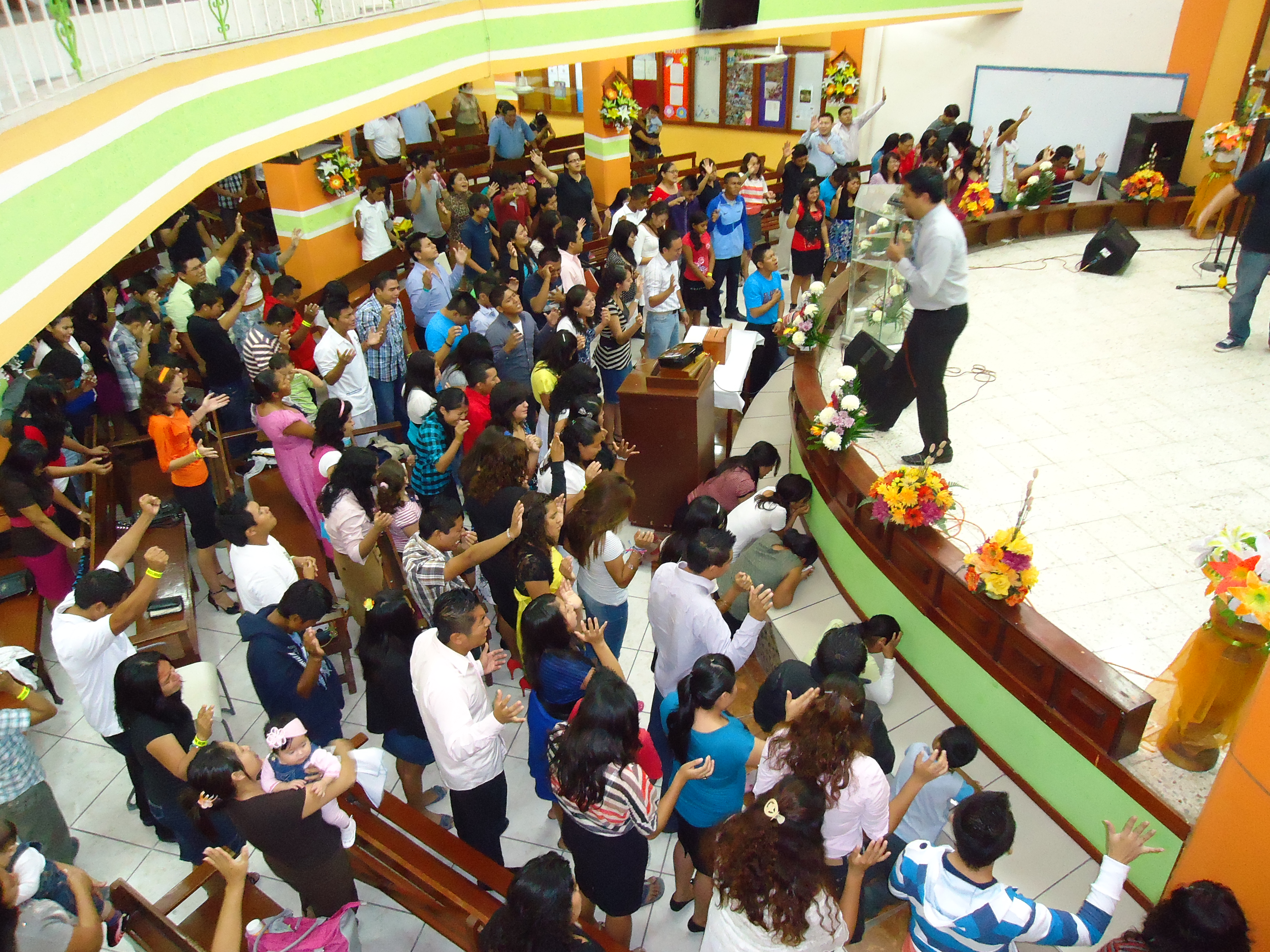
Pentecostals pray in tongues at an Assemblies of God church in Cancún, Mexico.

Holiness Pentecostals, with their background in the holiness movement of Methodism, have added a third work of grace, a baptism with the Holy Spirit evidenced by glossolalia, to the new birth (first work of grace) and entire sanctification (second work of grace). The baptism of the Holy Ghost is taught by Holiness Pentecostals to empower the Christian believer for service to God. In contrast, Methodism teaches that the second work of grace—entire sanctification—is the baptism of the Holy Spirit and it is the second work of grace that empowers the believer to serve God with a har that has been made perfect in love.

Finished Work Pentecostals teaches a progressive sanctification that begins at the New Birth, but rejects the possibility of being entirely sanctified.

=== Quaker theology ===
George Fox, the founder of Quakerism (Society of Friends), taught Perfectionism, in which the Christian believer could be made free from sin.

The early Quakers, following Fox, taught that as a result of the New Birth through the power of the Holy Spirit, man could be free from actual sinning if he continued to rely on the inward light and "focus on the cross of Christ as the center of faith". George Fox emphasized "personal responsibility for faith and emancipation from sin" in his teaching on perfectionism. For the Christian, "perfectionism and freedom from sin were possible in this world".

=== Reformed theology ===
The Reformed tradition is represented by the Continental Reformed, Congregationalist, Anglican, and Reformed Baptist traditions. They teach the doctrines of predestination and limited atonement. The view of atonement taught by these denominations is known as penal substitution. With respect to salvation, the Reformed are monergist.

Though five additional rites are celebrated, the Reformed tradition has two sacraments, baptism and the Lord's Supper, which are signs and seals of the covenant of grace according to federalism. Reformed churches teach the real pneumatic presence with respect to the Lord's Supper.

The Heidelberg Catechism, in explaining the Law and Gospel, teaches that the moral law as contained in the Ten Commandments is binding for Christians and that it instructs Christians how to live in service to God in gratitude for His grace shown in redeeming mankind. John Calvin, the lead figure in establishing the Reformed tradition, deemed this third use of the Law as its primary use.

=== Dispensational theology ===
Dispensational theology is represented by many independent Protestant churches, such as various non-denominational, Baptist, Pentecostal and Charismatic groups, being particularly common in churches affiliated with Free Grace theology.

Dispensationalism at its core is the use of the historical-grammatical method for the entirety of the Bible, leading dispensationalists to read the eschatological passages of the Bible literally. This causes dispensational theology to distinguish strongly between Israel and the Church, believing that the Old Testament promises to Israel await final fulfilment, while the Church is viewed as a new entity consisting of all individuals from the book of Acts until the future rapture.

== See also ==
- Christian theology
