= Kentucky Route 377 =

State highway in Kentucky, United States

Kentucky Route 377
- KY 377 highlighted in red

Route information
- Maintained by KYTC
- Length: 23.894 mi (38.454 km)

Major junctions
- South end: KY 32 in Webster
- KY 799 in Triplett
- North end: KY 344 near Stricklett

Location
- Country: United States
- State: Kentucky
- Counties: Rowan, Lewis

Highway system
- Kentucky State Highway System; Interstate; US; State; Parkways
← KY 376	→ KY 378

Kentucky Route 377 (KY 377) is a 23.894-mile-long (38.454 km) state highway in the U.S. state of Kentucky. The highway connects mostly rural areas of Rowan and Lewis counties with the Morehead area.

== Route description ==
=== Rowan County ===
KY 377 begins at an intersection with KY 32 (Flemingsburg Road) northwest of Morehead, within Rowan County, where the roadway continues as Stonehedge Drive. This intersection is just east of the Rowan County Senior High School. It travels to the east-northeast and curves to the north-northwest. It crosses over Big Brushy Creek and curves to the north-northeast. It begins traveling along the edge of Daniel Boone National Forest and temporarily enters the forest proper. It crosses over Grassy Lick, Pond Lick, and Weaver branches. The highway curves to a nearly due north direction and re-enters the forest. It crosses over DeBord and Emory branches and curves to the northeast. It travels through Cranston and crosses over Clear Fork. It crosses over Hogge Branch, passes Tildon–Hogge Elementary School, and crosses over Fisher Branch. It travels to the northeast and crosses over Rock Fork. It begins a concurrency with KY 799 (Rockfork Road). The two highways cross over Estep, Schoolhouse, and Shop branches before entering Triplett, where they split. KY 377 heads to a nearly due north direction. It crosses over Evans Branch and passes Evans Cemetery. It crosses over McClurg and Browning branches and passes Clark Cemetery before curving to the north-northwest. It begins paralleling the North Fork Triplett Creek. Later, the highway crosses over North Fork Triplett Creek and Adams Branch before passing Adams Cemetery. It crosses over Barn and Mock branches before leaving North Fork Triplett Creek. Right after this, it crosses over Bill Brown Hollow and begins paralleling it. The highway curves to the west-northwest, leaving the hollow. It then leaves the forest and enters Lewis County.

=== Lewis County ===
KY 377 curves to the north-northwest. It crosses over Duff and Mc Cless hollows before curving to the north-northeast. It crosses over Hardy Fork and begins paralleling Indian Creek. It crosses over Stamm Fork and curves to the northeast. It crosses over Kincaid, Little, Thomas, and Cloddy Field branches. It then crosses over Silver Lick Hollow and then Big, Mill, House, and Pea Vine branches. It finally crosses over Kinniconick Creek before it meets its northern terminus, an intersection with KY 344.

== Major intersections ==
County	Location	mi	km	Destinations	Notes
Rowan		0.000	0.000	KY 32 (Flemingsburg Road)	Southern terminus
Rowan		7.035	11.322	KY 799 north (Rockfork Road)	Southern end of KY 799 concurrency
Rowan	Triplett	8.049	12.954	KY 799 south (Big Perry Road)	Northern end of KY 799 concurrency
Lewis		23.894	38.454	KY 344	Northern terminus
1.000 mi = 1.609 km; 1.000 km = 0.621 mi: Concurrency terminus
