= Kentucky Route 59 =

State highway in Kentucky, United States

Kentucky Route 59
- KY 59 highlighted in red

Route information
- Maintained by KYTC
- Length: 25.999 mi (41.841 km)

Major junctions
- South end: KY 2 near Olive Hill
- AA Hwy (KY 9) / KY 10 in Vanceburg
- North end: KY 8 in Vanceburg

Location
- Country: United States
- State: Kentucky
- Counties: Carter, Lewis

Highway system
- Kentucky State Highway System; Interstate; US; State; Parkways
← KY 58	→ US 60

Kentucky Route 59 (KY 59) is a 25.999-mile-long (41.841 km) state highway in Kentucky.

== Route description ==
KY 59 starts at a junction with KY 2 near Olive Hill in Carter County. This is the only major junction in the county. KY 59 enters Lewis County south of Emerson. It intersects KY 1662 there. Then, KY 59 meets KY 1068 and KY 474 before reaching Kinniconick, where it intersects with KY 344; all four routes terminate at KY 59. In Vanceburg, KY 59 intersects with KY 9, KY 10, and KY 1149 before terminating at KY 8.

== Junction list ==
County	Location	mi	km	Destinations	Notes
Carter		0.000	0.000	KY 2	
Lewis	Emerson	3.391	5.457	KY 1662 west (Rayburn Fork Road)	Eastern terminus of KY 1662
Lewis		9.202	14.809	KY 1068 west (Laurel Creek Road)	Eastern terminus of KY 1068
Lewis		12.732	20.490	KY 474 east (Scotts Branch Road)	Western terminus of KY 474
Lewis	Kinniconick	20.525	33.032	KY 344 west – Flemingsburg	Eastern terminus of KY 344
Lewis	Vanceburg	24.963	40.174	AA Hwy (KY 9) / KY 10	
Lewis	Vanceburg	25.344	40.787	KY 1149 east (Washington Avenue)	Western terminus of KY 1149
Lewis	Vanceburg	25.999	41.841	KY 8 / Main Street	Northern terminus of KY 59; former KY 2525 east
1.000 mi = 1.609 km; 1.000 km = 0.621 mi
