= Head of Grassy, Kentucky =

Unincorporated community in Kentucky, United States

- Unincorporated community
- Location within Kentucky Location within the United States
- Coordinates: 38°23′25″N 83°15′49″W
- Country: United States
- State: Kentucky
- County: Lewis
- Elevation: 725 ft (221 m)
- Time zone: UTC-5 (Eastern (EST))
  - Summer (DST): UTC-4 (EDT)
- ZIP code: 41135
- Area code: 606
- GNIS feature ID: 493970

Head of Grassy is an unincorporated community in Lewis County, Kentucky, United States. Head of Grassy is located on Kentucky Route 59 and the Grassy Fork 14.7 miles (23.7 km) south-southeast of Vanceburg; its name is a misnomer, as it lies 5 miles (8.0 km) downstream from the head of the Grassy Fork. Head of Grassy had a post office, which opened on November 19, 1878, and closed in 1982 or 1984.
