= George M. Thomas (American politician) =

American politician

George Morgan Thomas
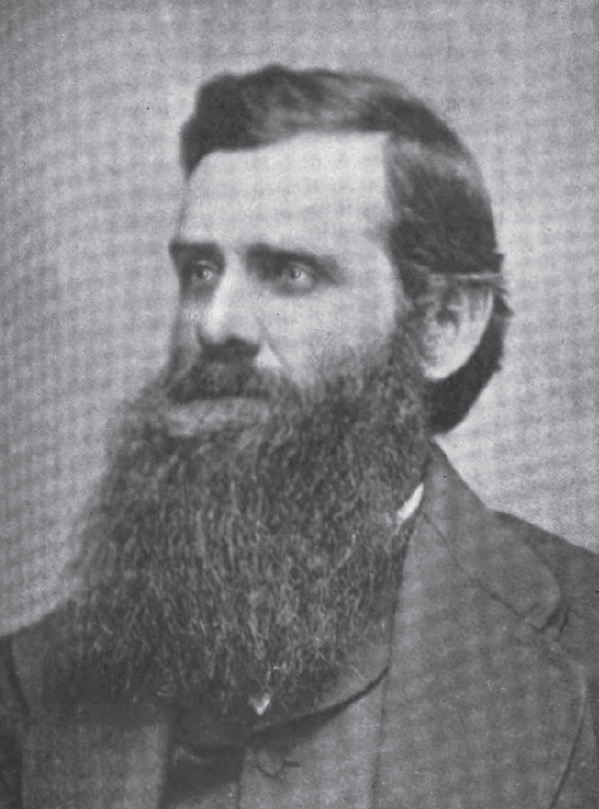

Member of the U.S. House of Representatives from Kentucky's 9th district
- In office March 4, 1887 – March 3, 1889
- Preceded by: William H. Wadsworth
- Succeeded by: Thomas H. Paynter

Member of the Kentucky House of Representatives from Lewis County
- In office February 21, 1872 – January 1875
- Preceded by: T. J. Walker
- Succeeded by: Rufus Emmons
- In office August 1, 1859 – May 1862
- Preceded by: Thomas H. C. Bruce
- Succeeded by: Perry S. Layton

Personal details
- Born: November 23, 1828 Poplar Flat, Lewis County, Kentucky
- Died: January 7, 1914 (aged 85) Vanceburg, Kentucky
- Party: Republican
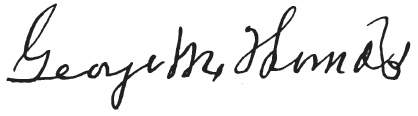
- Signature

George Morgan Thomas (November 23, 1828 – January 7, 1914) was a U.S. representative from Lewis County, Kentucky.

Born near Poplar Flat, Kentucky, in Lewis County, Thomas was educated in the common schools. He taught school two years. He was school commissioner from 1850 to 1859. He studied law, was admitted to the bar in 1851, and practiced.

Thomas was elected prosecuting attorney of Lewis County in 1854 and served for four years. He was a member of the Kentucky House of Representatives from 1859 to 1863. He served as Commonwealth's attorney for the tenth judicial district 1862–1868. He was elected county judge in 1868 and was an unsuccessful Republican candidate for Lieutenant Governor of Kentucky in 1871, losing the election to Democrat John G. Carlisle. He was again a member of the State house of representatives in 1872 and 1873. He was the circuit judge of the fourteenth judicial district from 1874 to 1880 and United States district attorney from 1881 to 1885.

Thomas was elected as a Republican to the Fiftieth Congress (March 4, 1887 – March 3, 1889). He was appointed Solicitor of Internal Revenue by President William McKinley on May 20, 1897, and served until May 31, 1901.

He died in Vanceburg, Kentucky, January 7, 1914. He was interred in Woodland Cemetery on a hill overlooking the city.

Party political offices
Preceded by R. Tarvin Baker	Republican nominee for Governor of Kentucky; 1871	Succeeded by John Marshall Harlan
U.S. House of Representatives
Preceded by William H. Wadsworth	Member of the U.S. House of Representatives from Kentucky's 9th congressional district 1887 – 1889	Succeeded by Thomas H. Paynter
