= Saint Paul, Kentucky =

Saint Paul may refer to the following places in the U.S. state of Kentucky:

- Saint Paul, Grayson County, Kentucky
- Saint Paul, Lewis County, Kentucky
