= Rugless =

Rugless may refer to:

- Rugless, Kentucky, a community in Lewis County, Kentucky
- Troy Rugless, a former English rugby player
