= General Baptists =

Arminian strand of the Baptist denomination

General Baptists, sometimes called Arminian Baptists, are Baptists that hold to the doctrine of general atonement (belief that Jesus Christ died for all humanity).

General Baptists have produced two major confessions of faith: The Standard Confession of Faith (1660), and the Orthodox Creed (1679). Henry Denne, Thomas Grantham and Daniel Taylor were some of the greatest theological figures for the General Baptist strand in England. Together with the Particular Baptists, the second strand, they form the Baptist tradition.

== Historical background ==
In the late 16th century and early 17th century, Puritan activity was strong in the English Midlands. In this period, a Puritan church gathered in Gainsborough, led by the cleric John Smyth, recently excommunicated for dissatisfaction with the state of the Church of England, as persecution against Puritan reforms. The church came to be known as the Gainsborough Congregation. They later developed a distinctive Baptist theology and is considered one of the precursors of General Baptists. Under Thomas Helwys' ministry, the church was reestablished at Spitalfields outside London in 1612, after a brief period of exile in Amsterdam.

In 1660, all General Baptists ministers and deacons assembled together in the City of London to draw up a confession of faith defining their theology. They elected Thomas Grantham and Joseph Wright to present the confession to King Charles II in the same year. It was adopted by their ecclesiastical organization, the General Assembly of General Baptists.

Charles Marie Du Veil, a respected French Huguenot Biblical scholar, became a General Baptist. He was baptised into the St. Paul's Alley church and published his new views. Du Veil helped the General Baptist influence after 1685.

In 1733, a case against several Northamptonshire churches was presented to the General Assembly for "singing the psalms of David or other men's composures" which determined no fixed rule on congregational singing, but deferred to the local church to set forth their own reasons as the General Assembly had in 1689.

== In America ==
In 1825, opponents of General Baptists in North Carolina dubbed them as "Freewillers" for their Arminian belief. Then, these Baptists assumed the name Free Will Baptists.

Arminian Baptists who accepted the existence of a second work of grace during the Holiness movement established associations such as the Ohio Valley Association of the Christian Baptist Churches of God and Holiness Baptist Association.

== Denominations ==
- All-Ukrainian Union of Churches of Evangelical Christian Baptists
- General Association of General Baptists
- General Six-Principle Baptists
- Holiness Baptist Association
- Some Independent Baptist churches
- Marianas Association of General Baptists
- National Association of Free Will Baptists
- New Connexion of General Baptists
- Ohio Valley Association of the Christian Baptist Churches of God
- Old Baptist Union
- Original Free Will Baptist Convention
- Pentecostal Free Will Baptist Church
- Russian Union of Evangelical Christians-Baptists
- Union of Evangelical Christian Baptists of Kazakhstan
- United American Free Will Baptist Church
- United American Free Will Baptist Conference
