= 1880 United States presidential election in Kentucky =

- November 2, 1880
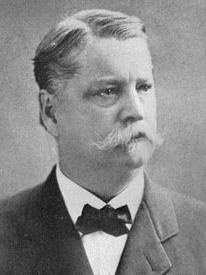

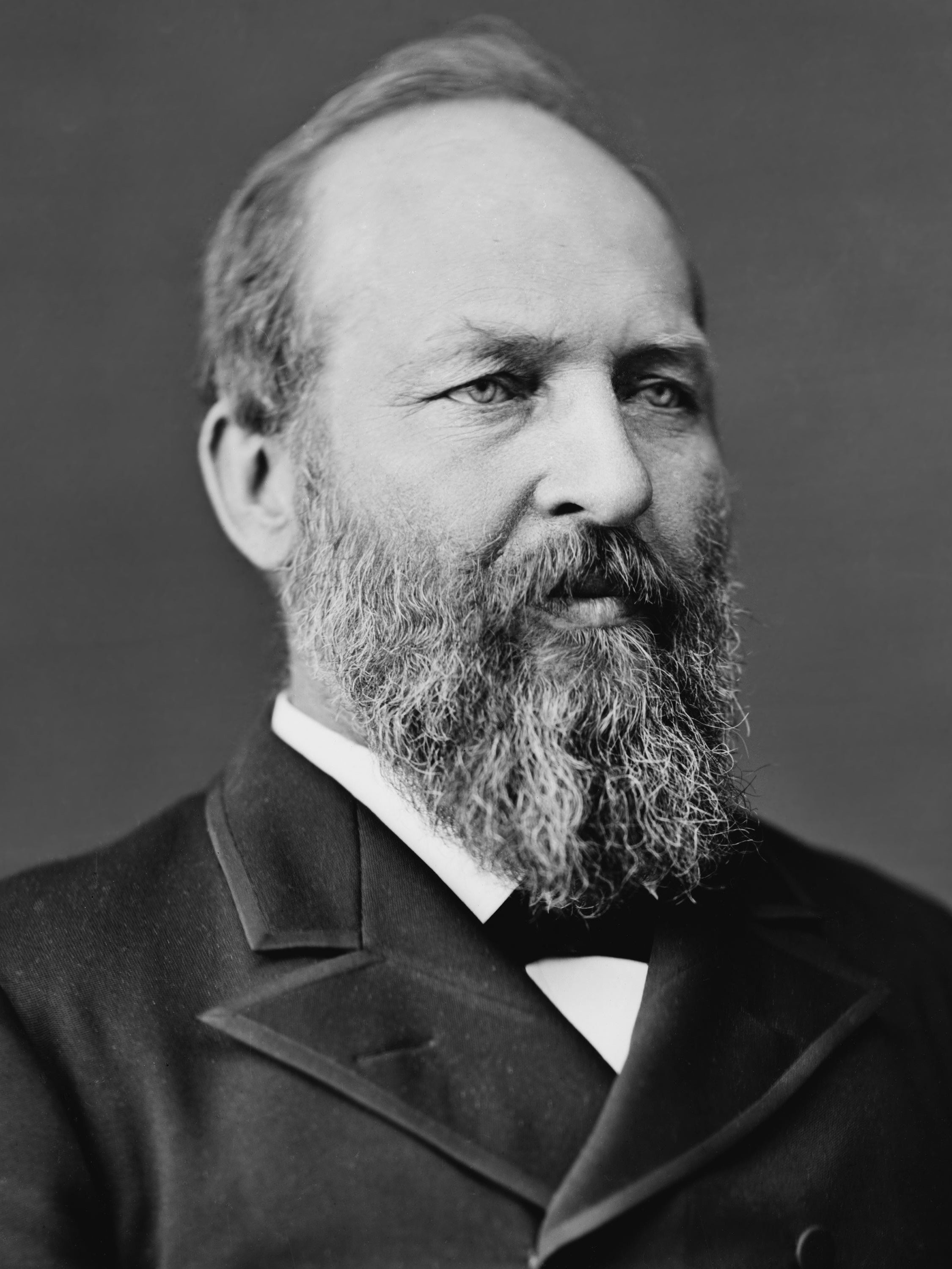
Nominee	Winfield Scott Hancock	James A. Garfield
Party	Democratic	Republican
Home state	Pennsylvania	Ohio
Running mate	William Hayden English	Chester A. Arthur
Electoral vote	12	0
Popular vote	148,875	106,490
Percentage	55.74%	39.87%
County results
Hancock
40–50%
50–60%
60–70%
70–80%
80–90%
Garfield
40–50%
50–60%
60–70%
70–80%
80–90%
90–100%
President before election
Rutherford B. Hayes
Republican
Elected President
James Garfield
Republican

The 1880 United States presidential election in Kentucky took place on November 2, 1880. All contemporary thirty-eight states were part of the 1880 United States presidential election. Voters chose twelve electors to the Electoral College, which selected the president and vice president.

Ever since the Civil War, Kentucky had been shaped politically by divisions created by that war between secessionist, Democratic counties and Unionist, Republican ones, although the state as a whole leaned Democratic throughout this era and the GOP would never carry the state during the Third Party System at either presidential or gubernatorial level. Following Samuel J. Tilden’s 24-point victory in the state in 1876, the tobacco-growing Jackson Purchase and Western Coal Field were affected by the Greenback movement. This aimed to restore the fiat money system used to pay for the Civil War, in order to pay off farmer’s debts. It also was aimed at regulating the railroads which the western landowners – many former slaveholders – saw as siphoning the profit from their cash crop economy.

The Greenback movement managed to carry 8.3 percent of the vote in the 1879 gubernatorial election, but a rebound in tobacco prices and the adoption of some key elements of the Greenback platform by Democrats ensured that this decline was arrested and Greenback nominee James B. Weaver won only 4.39 percent of Kentucky’s ballots. Weaver did best in the regions where the Greenback insurgency was always strongest, but received no votes at all in fourteen of Kentucky’s 117 counties (most of those lying in the Eastern Coalfield). Democratic nominee Winfield Scott Hancock thus comfortably carried the state, although his margin was only two-thirds that of Tilden. As of the 2020 presidential election, this is the last occasion when Rockcastle County voted for a Democratic presidential candidate.

== Results ==
Presidential Candidate	Running Mate	Party	Electoral Vote (EV)	Popular Vote (PV)	
Winfield Scott Hancock	William Hayden English	Democratic	12	148,875	55.74%
James A. Garfield	Chester A. Arthur	Republican	0	106,490	39.87%
James B. Weaver	Barzillai J. Chambers	Greenback	0	11,506	4.31%
Neal Dow	Henry Adams Thompson	Prohibition	0	233	0.09%

=== Results by county ===
County	Winfield Scott Hancock Democratic		James Abram Garfield Republican		James Baird Weaver Greenback		Neal Dow Prohibition		Margin		Total votes cast
County	#	%	#	%	#	%	#	%	#	%	Total votes cast
Adair	1,095	50.93%	937	43.58%	118	5.49%	0	0.00%	158	7.35%	2,150
Allen	949	55.89%	688	40.52%	61	3.59%	0	0.00%	261	15.37%	1,698
Anderson	1,118	65.08%	595	34.63%	2	0.12%	3	0.17%	523	30.44%	1,718
Ballard	1,599	77.96%	411	20.04%	41	2.00%	0	0.00%	1,188	57.92%	2,051
Barren	2,140	59.28%	1,358	37.62%	111	3.07%	1	0.03%	782	21.66%	3,610
Bath	1,128	56.26%	874	43.59%	3	0.15%	0	0.00%	254	12.67%	2,005
Bell	261	32.83%	533	67.04%	1	0.13%	0	0.00%	-272	-34.21%	795
Boone	1,734	79.43%	446	20.43%	3	0.14%	0	0.00%	1,288	59.00%	2,183
Bourbon	1,686	50.22%	1,668	49.69%	1	0.03%	2	0.06%	18	0.54%	3,357
Boyd	794	40.33%	959	48.70%	216	10.97%	0	0.00%	-165	-8.38%	1,969
Boyle	1,284	51.77%	1,191	48.02%	4	0.16%	1	0.04%	93	3.75%	2,480
Bracken	1,542	63.90%	817	33.86%	32	1.33%	22	0.91%	725	30.05%	2,413
Breathitt	797	70.28%	330	29.10%	2	0.18%	5	0.44%	467	41.18%	1,134
Breckinridge	1,376	49.96%	912	33.12%	462	16.78%	4	0.15%	464	16.85%	2,754
Bullitt	788	71.25%	275	24.86%	43	3.89%	0	0.00%	513	46.38%	1,106
Butler	540	29.88%	728	40.29%	537	29.72%	2	0.11%	-188	-10.40%	1,807
Caldwell	1,160	56.15%	899	43.51%	7	0.34%	0	0.00%	261	12.63%	2,066
Calloway	1,187	69.37%	257	15.02%	267	15.60%	0	0.00%	920 (Note: In this county where Weaver ran second ahead of Garfield, margin given is Cleveland vote minus Weaver vote and percentage margin Cleveland percentage minus Weaver percentage.)	53.77%	1,711
Campbell	3,059	50.93%	2,899	48.27%	48	0.80%	0	0.00%	160	2.66%	6,006
Carroll	1,460	79.69%	372	20.31%	0	0.00%	0	0.00%	1,088	59.39%	1,832
Carter	577	37.30%	695	44.93%	275	17.78%	0	0.00%	-118	-7.63%	1,547
Casey	892	54.93%	708	43.60%	24	1.48%	0	0.00%	184	11.33%	1,624
Christian	1,853	35.75%	2,844	54.87%	486	9.38%	0	0.00%	-991	-19.12%	5,183
Clark	1,263	54.00%	1,059	45.28%	17	0.73%	0	0.00%	204	8.72%	2,339
Clay	674	42.18%	922	57.70%	2	0.13%	0	0.00%	-248	-15.52%	1,598
Clinton	323	32.36%	605	60.62%	70	7.01%	0	0.00%	-282	-28.26%	998
Crittenden	827	45.59%	786	43.33%	201	11.08%	0	0.00%	41	2.26%	1,814
Cumberland	598	44.56%	729	54.32%	15	1.12%	0	0.00%	-131	-9.76%	1,342
Daviess	3,054	66.91%	1,271	27.85%	239	5.24%	0	0.00%	1,783	39.07%	4,564
Edmonson	484	49.24%	432	43.95%	67	6.82%	0	0.00%	52	5.29%	983
Elliott	623	78.27%	115	14.45%	58	7.29%	0	0.00%	508	63.82%	796
Estill	809	50.98%	772	48.65%	6	0.38%	0	0.00%	37	2.33%	1,587
Fayette	2,449	46.03%	2,830	53.20%	39	0.73%	2	0.04%	-381	-7.16%	5,320
Fleming	1,592	53.53%	1,368	46.00%	9	0.30%	5	0.17%	224	7.53%	2,974
Floyd	946	70.33%	394	29.29%	5	0.37%	0	0.00%	552	41.04%	1,345
Franklin	1,751	60.17%	1,134	38.97%	18	0.62%	7	0.24%	617	21.20%	2,910
Fulton	707	77.52%	179	19.63%	26	2.85%	0	0.00%	528	57.89%	912
Gallatin	683	71.37%	274	28.63%	0	0.00%	0	0.00%	409	42.74%	957
Garrard	1,069	46.80%	1,190	52.10%	24	1.05%	1	0.04%	-121	-5.30%	2,284
Grant	1,333	60.54%	869	39.46%	0	0.00%	0	0.00%	464	21.07%	2,202
Graves	2,443	69.54%	930	26.47%	140	3.99%	0	0.00%	1,513	43.07%	3,513
Grayson	1,012	50.07%	724	35.82%	283	14.00%	2	0.10%	288	14.25%	2,021
Green	685	44.77%	726	47.45%	114	7.45%	5	0.33%	-41	-2.68%	1,530
Greenup	723	35.60%	925	45.54%	383	18.86%	0	0.00%	-202	-9.95%	2,031
Hancock	560	41.48%	270	20.00%	517	38.30%	3	0.22%	43	3.19%	1,350
Hardin	1,677	56.87%	962	32.62%	310	10.51%	0	0.00%	715	24.25%	2,949
Harlan	166	18.97%	704	80.46%	5	0.57%	0	0.00%	-538	-61.49%	875
Harrison	1,866	62.26%	1,103	36.80%	1	0.03%	27	0.90%	763	25.46%	2,997
Hart	1,454	54.42%	1,074	40.19%	144	5.39%	0	0.00%	380	14.22%	2,672
Henderson	2,217	55.89%	1,504	37.91%	245	6.18%	1	0.03%	713	17.97%	3,967
Henry	1,661	60.22%	883	32.02%	213	7.72%	1	0.04%	778	28.21%	2,758
Hickman	1,069	72.04%	386	26.01%	29	1.95%	0	0.00%	683	46.02%	1,484
Hopkins	1,459	49.81%	838	28.61%	632	21.58%	0	0.00%	621	21.20%	2,929
Jackson	272	26.15%	758	72.88%	10	0.96%	0	0.00%	-486	-46.73%	1,040
Jefferson	13,970	60.08%	8,746	37.61%	522	2.24%	14	0.06%	5,224	22.47%	23,252
Jessamine	979	47.99%	1,057	51.81%	4	0.20%	0	0.00%	-78	-3.82%	2,040
Johnson	472	40.65%	603	51.94%	86	7.41%	0	0.00%	-131	-11.28%	1,161
Kenton	4,370	59.29%	2,980	40.43%	13	0.18%	7	0.09%	1,390	18.86%	7,370
Knox	611	38.60%	964	60.90%	6	0.38%	2	0.13%	-353	-22.30%	1,583
Larue	1,032	66.97%	469	30.43%	40	2.60%	0	0.00%	563	36.53%	1,541
Laurel	622	40.55%	905	59.00%	6	0.39%	1	0.07%	-283	-18.45%	1,534
Lawrence	936	55.19%	726	42.81%	34	2.00%	0	0.00%	210	12.38%	1,696
Lee	394	48.46%	418	51.41%	1	0.12%	0	0.00%	-24	-2.95%	813
Leslie	57	9.91%	518	90.09%	0	0.00%	0	0.00%	-461	-80.17%	575
Letcher	379	55.82%	300	44.18%	0	0.00%	0	0.00%	79	11.63%	679
Lewis	1,075	42.04%	1,388	54.28%	94	3.68%	0	0.00%	-313	-12.24%	2,557
Lincoln	1,545	56.91%	1,170	43.09%	0	0.00%	0	0.00%	375	13.81%	2,715
Livingston	868	76.75%	222	19.63%	41	3.63%	0	0.00%	646	57.12%	1,131
Logan	2,409	60.23%	1,488	37.20%	103	2.58%	0	0.00%	921	23.03%	4,000
Lyon	630	54.64%	427	37.03%	96	8.33%	0	0.00%	203	17.61%	1,153
Madison	2,056	50.50%	2,003	49.20%	4	0.10%	8	0.20%	53	1.30%	4,071
Magoffin	553	47.18%	619	52.82%	0	0.00%	0	0.00%	-66	-5.63%	1,172
Marion	1,525	59.59%	1,023	39.98%	11	0.43%	0	0.00%	502	19.62%	2,559
Marshall	979	72.30%	196	14.48%	179	13.22%	0	0.00%	783	57.83%	1,354
Martin	121	28.47%	304	71.53%	0	0.00%	0	0.00%	-183	-43.06%	425
Mason	2,536	60.68%	1,640	39.24%	3	0.07%	0	0.00%	896	21.44%	4,179
McCracken	1,537	59.12%	1,045	40.19%	18	0.69%	0	0.00%	492	18.92%	2,600
McLean	755	52.65%	337	23.50%	340	23.71%	2	0.14%	415	28.94%	1,434
Meade	1,067	67.36%	317	20.01%	200	12.63%	0	0.00%	750	47.35%	1,584
Menifee	490	75.27%	158	24.27%	1	0.15%	2	0.31%	332	51.00%	651
Mercer	1,591	57.60%	1,158	41.93%	11	0.40%	2	0.07%	433	15.68%	2,762
Metcalfe	736	47.89%	772	50.23%	26	1.69%	3	0.20%	-36	-2.34%	1,537
Monroe	516	36.54%	621	43.98%	275	19.48%	0	0.00%	-105	-7.44%	1,412
Montgomery	1,211	55.81%	957	44.10%	1	0.05%	1	0.05%	254	11.71%	2,170
Morgan	1,139	72.00%	443	28.00%	0	0.00%	0	0.00%	696	43.99%	1,582
Muhlenberg	1,057	45.62%	917	39.58%	339	14.63%	4	0.17%	140	6.04%	2,317
Nelson	1,758	62.90%	949	33.95%	87	3.11%	1	0.04%	809	28.94%	2,795
Nicholas	1,416	61.11%	901	38.89%	0	0.00%	0	0.00%	515	22.23%	2,317
Ohio	1,645	61.11%	702	26.08%	336	12.48%	9	0.33%	943	35.03%	2,692
Oldham	901	62.35%	502	34.74%	42	2.91%	0	0.00%	399	27.61%	1,445
Owen	2,644	80.49%	630	19.18%	4	0.12%	7	0.21%	2,014	61.31%	3,285
Owsley	222	25.08%	663	74.92%	0	0.00%	0	0.00%	-441	-49.83%	885
Pendleton	1,779	59.58%	1,186	39.72%	2	0.07%	19	0.64%	593	19.86%	2,986
Perry	318	36.26%	559	63.74%	0	0.00%	0	0.00%	-241	-27.48%	877
Pike	1,060	57.86%	758	41.38%	11	0.60%	3	0.16%	302	16.48%	1,832
Powell	343	52.45%	308	47.09%	3	0.46%	0	0.00%	35	5.35%	654
Pulaski	1,459	43.58%	1,860	55.56%	29	0.87%	0	0.00%	-401	-11.98%	3,348
Robertson	696	63.56%	395	36.07%	2	0.18%	2	0.18%	301	27.49%	1,095
Rockcastle	760	48.10%	749	47.41%	71	4.49%	0	0.00%	11	0.70%	1,580
Rowan	289	48.41%	281	47.07%	27	4.52%	0	0.00%	8	1.34%	597
Russell	531	51.06%	366	35.19%	143	13.75%	0	0.00%	165	15.87%	1,040
Scott	1,683	56.34%	1,299	43.49%	3	0.10%	2	0.07%	384	12.86%	2,987
Shelby	1,849	61.33%	1,039	34.46%	108	3.58%	19	0.63%	810	26.87%	3,015
Simpson	1,076	67.80%	501	31.57%	2	0.13%	8	0.50%	575	36.23%	1,587
Spencer	850	70.25%	358	29.59%	1	0.08%	1	0.08%	492	40.66%	1,210
Taylor	879	62.08%	537	37.92%	0	0.00%	0	0.00%	342	24.15%	1,416
Todd	1,250	47.10%	1,201	45.25%	202	7.61%	1	0.04%	49	1.85%	2,654
Trigg	1,262	58.86%	873	40.72%	9	0.42%	0	0.00%	389	18.14%	2,144
Trimble	1,082	86.98%	151	12.14%	11	0.88%	0	0.00%	931	74.84%	1,244
Union	1,931	69.86%	514	18.60%	309	11.18%	10	0.36%	1,417	51.27%	2,764
Warren	2,253	53.63%	1,703	40.54%	239	5.69%	6	0.14%	550	13.09%	4,201
Washington	1,319	52.16%	1,172	46.34%	38	1.50%	0	0.00%	147	5.81%	2,529
Wayne	709	51.79%	523	38.20%	137	10.01%	0	0.00%	186	13.59%	1,369
Webster	946	47.35%	393	19.67%	655	32.78%	4	0.20%	291	14.56%	1,998
Whitley	479	33.08%	962	66.44%	7	0.48%	0	0.00%	-483	-33.36%	1,448
Wolfe	572	62.11%	348	37.79%	0	0.00%	1	0.11%	224	24.32%	921
Woodford	1,228	52.64%	1,104	47.32%	1	0.04%	0	0.00%	124	5.32%	2,333
Totals	148,875	55.74%	106,490	39.87%	11,499	4.31%	233	0.09%	42,385	15.87%	267,097

== See also ==
- United States presidential elections in Kentucky
