= Marianas Association of General Baptists =

The Marianas Association of General Baptists is a General Baptist Christian association of churches in the Mariana Islands.

== History ==
Baptist missionary work in the Mariana Islands began in 1911 on the island of Guam, and was supported by the General Baptist Foreign Missionary Society. The Marianas Association was organized in 1962. The Foreign Mission Society started mission work in Saipan in 1947.

In 1995, the association was composed of five churches with 680 members, with four churches located on Guam in Agana Heights, Agat, Talofofo, and Yigo, and one in the Commonwealth of the Northern Mariana Islands in Saipan. The Saipan Community School is a ministry of Saipan Community Church.
