= Poplar Flat, Kentucky =

Unincorporated community in Kentucky, United States

- Unincorporated community
- Location in Kentucky Location in the United States
- Coordinates: 38°35′40″N 83°31′25″W
- Country: United States
- State: Kentucky
- County: Lewis
- Elevation: 699 ft (213 m)
- Time zone: UTC-5 (Eastern (EST))
  - Summer (DST): UTC-4 (EST)
- GNIS feature ID: 508853

Poplar Flat is an unincorporated community in Lewis County, Kentucky, United States.

== Notable native ==
- George M. Thomas, U.S. Congressman
