= Lewis County High School (Vanceburg, Kentucky) =

Public high school in Vanceburg, Kentucky

Coordinates: 38.6000°N 83.3448°W

Location
- 79 Lions Lane, P.O. Box 99; Vanceburg, Kentucky; United States

Information
- Locale: Lewis County, Kentucky
- School district: Lewis County Schools
- Principal: Jack Lykins
- Teaching staff: 28.49 (FTE)
- Grades: 9–12
- Enrollment: 602 (2023–2024)
- Student to teacher ratio: 21.13
- Colors: Royal blue, red and white
- Team name: Lions
- Website: School website

Lewis County High School (LCHS) is a public grade 9–12 high school located in Vanceburg, Kentucky. The school is operated by Lewis County Schools and is the sole public high school for Lewis County, Kentucky, which has a population of 13,870.

== School demographics ==
The demographic breakdown of the 688 students enrolled during the 2018–19 was:

- Male - 50.7%
- Female - 49.3%
- White - 96.1%
- Two of More Races - 2.5%
- Hispanic or Latino - 0.9%
- Other - 0.5%

68.8% of the student body were considered economically disadvantaged.

== Athletics ==
Students at Lewis County High School have the opportunity to participate in variety of different athletic programs including:

- Football
- Golf
- Volleyball
- Track and Field
- Basketball
- Baseball
- Softball
- Tennis

Among its athletics programs many accomplishment include their 1978 football team's perfect season.

The Lady Lions softball team has won back-to-back 16th region championships in 2021 and 2022 along with three straight 63rd district championships in 2019, 2021, and 2022. No tournament held in 2020.

== Notable alumni ==
- Thomas Massie, United States Representative
