= Pence, Lewis County, Kentucky =

Unincorporated community in Kentucky, United States

Pence, Kentucky
- Unincorporated community
- Location within Kentucky
- Coordinates: 38°41′47″N 83°31′58″W
- Country: United States
- State: Kentucky
- County: Lewis
- Elevation: 528 ft (161 m)
- Time zone: UTC-5 (Eastern (EST))
  - Summer (DST): UTC-4 (EDT)
- Area code: 606
- GNIS feature ID: 508797

Pence is an unincorporated community in Lewis County, Kentucky, United States.
