= Lewis County Schools (Kentucky) =

School district in Kentucky, United States

Location
- Lewis County, Kentucky; United States

District information
- Grades: Preschool–12th
- Superintendent: Michael Melton
- School board: Lewis County Board of Education
- Chair of the board: Bryan McRoberts
- Schools: 7
- Budget: $33,234,369

Students and staff
- Students: 2,155
- Teachers: 142

Other information
- Website: Official website

Lewis County Schools is the operating school district for Lewis County, Kentucky. The district is governed by the Lewis County Board of Education, of which the current Superintendent is Michael Melton.

== Schools ==
=== High school ===
- Lewis County High School - Vanceburg, Kentucky

=== Middle school ===
- Lewis County Middle School - Vanceburg, Kentucky

=== Elementary schools ===
- Lewis County Central Elementary - Vanceburg, Kentucky
- Garrison Elementary School - Garrison, Kentucky
- Tollesboro Elementary School - Tollesboro, Kentucky
- Laurel Elementary School - Vanceburg, Kentucky

In addition to six traditional K-12 schools, the district operates the Foster Meade Career & Tech Center located in Vanceburg, Kentucky.

== Statistics ==
2018–19 Information
	LCS	Statewide
Average teachers' salary	$47,788	$53,926
Average teachers' number of years experience	12.5	12
Economically disadvantaged students	73.6%	60.7%
Students with limited English proficiency	—	—
Student / teacher ratio	15	15

=== Student demographics ===
As of 2019, the student body demographics were:

- White (non-Hispanic): 96.6%
- Two or More Races: 2.6%
- Hispanic or Latino: 0.5%
- Other: 0.3%

== Lewis County Board of Education ==
The Lewis County Board of Education is composed of five elected board members. As of June 2020, the current board consists of:

Name	Position
Bryan McRoberts	Chairperson
Sara Gibbs	Board Member
Michelle Skidmore	Board Member
Cindy Applegate	Board Member
Todd Sartin	Board Member
