= Thomas Marshall (general) =

United States Army general

- Born: April 13, 1793; Mason County, Kentucky
- Died: March 28, 1853 (aged 59); Lewis County, Kentucky
- Relatives: Marshall family
- Military career
- Allegiance: United States of America
- Branch: United States Army
- Service years: 1846–1848
- Rank: Brigadier general of Volunteers
- Conflicts: Mexican–American War: Battle of Buena Vista
- Other work: Kentucky legislator

Thomas Marshall (April 13, 1793 – March 28, 1853), was a brigadier general of Volunteers in the United States Army during the Mexican–American War.

A nephew of Chief Justice John Marshall, Thomas Marshall served in the Kentucky legislature several times between 1817 and 1844, one of those terms as Speaker of the House. At the outbreak of the Mexican–American War, he was commissioned by President James K. Polk as a Brigadier General of Volunteers, and commanded the Kentucky brigade under General John E. Wool. After his return to Kentucky, he was murdered by a tenant at his home in Lewis County.
