= Awe, Kentucky =

Unincorporated community in Kentucky, United States

- Unincorporated community
- Location in Kentucky Location in the United States
- Coordinates: 38°25′17″N 83°20′40″W
- Country: United States
- State: Kentucky
- County: Lewis
- Elevation: 922 ft (281 m)
- Time zone: UTC-5 (Eastern (EST))
  - Summer (DST): UTC-4 (EST)
- GNIS feature ID: 507430

Awe, KY is an unincorporated community in Lewis County, Kentucky, United States. The Awe post office is closed.

The AWE Post Office The post office at AWE was established on May 20, 1898. Its first Postmaster was Anthony Wayne Everman. It is believed that the post office got its name from his initials, A. W. E. The Awe Post Office was located some five miles up Straight Fork of Kinney. In 1902 John F. Stander mote office one mile further up Straight Fork, to the mouth of Blue Ridge Fork, 16.5 miles south of Vanceburg. Here the office continued to operate through October 1935.

In this vicinity shortly after the Civil War, some German missionaries who had bought this land on Straight Fork planned a town they would call St. Mary's, but it never came about.

The Stander family was among them. (Talley, "A Trip Down Kinniconick." Lewis County Herald) Beulah Faye Hamm Lykins, a long-time school teacher and counselor in the Lewis County Public School System, in an interview dated 6/20/1977, is quoted as saying, "I don't know the precise location except that it was in the Lower Kinney section, in the Grassy - Laurel community. The name is all but forgotten by contemporary Lewis Countians. There is nothing there now..."

She continued, "According to tradition, this man was taking care of the mail and he ... didn't want it anymore and he was tired of it and couldn't get rid of it and said he just one day just sacked it all up in a sack and took it to the nearest store ... and they asked him what he had and he said he had the Post Office and he didn't want it anymore. I don't know how they disposed of it, but they didn't have any Post Office anymore."

The unusual name once inspired newspaperman J. S. Mavity to write: "Straight Fork ... dashes its water against the rocks and crags down a narrow valley probably 50 yards wide from hill to hill, and he who has looked upward through the tops of the tall spruce, pine, and hemlock endeavoring to see the sun at any time except noonday may feel the solemn awe which probably gave the post office its name. " (Book -P.11) Mavity knew that the first Postmaster was Anthony Wayne Everman, yet he waxed poetic in a May 19, 1922, letter to William Gladstone Steel of Medford, Oregon in a reply to the latter's request for information on Lewis County post offices and communities. The original letter is in the National Archives. He gave the Postmaster's name as Edington, that of another area family.
