= Emerson, Kentucky =

Unincorporated community in Kentucky, United States

- Unincorporated community
- Location within Kentucky Location within the United States
- Coordinates: 38°21′14″N 83°15′09″W
- Country: United States
- State: Kentucky
- County: Lewis
- Elevation: 801 ft (244 m)
- Time zone: UTC-5 (Eastern (EST))
  - Summer (DST): UTC-4 (EDT)
- ZIP code: 41135
- Area code: 606
- GNIS feature ID: 512066

Emerson is an unincorporated community in Lewis County, Kentucky, United States. Emerson is located at the junction of Kentucky Route 59 and Kentucky Route 1662 5.6 miles (9.0 km) northwest of Olive Hill. Emerson had a post office, which closed on September 20, 1997.
