= Ohio Valley Association of the Christian Baptist Churches of God =

Holiness Baptist denomination in the Ohio Valley area

The Ohio Valley Association of the Christian Baptist Churches of God is a Holiness Baptist denomination in the Ohio Valley area of the United States. It was formed January 3, 1931 in Portsmouth, Ohio. Four churches—Firebrick Chapel of Firebrick, Kentucky; Westwood Mission of Ashland, Kentucky; Mabert Road Church and North Moreland Church, both of Portsmouth, Ohio—were the original constituents of the organization. In addition to the ministers of these churches, representatives from the Scioto Yearly Conference of Free Will Baptists and the Enterprise Association of Regular Baptists assisted in organizing the conference.

Articles of Faith, Constitution and Rules of Decorum were adopted and the name of the Ohio Valley Association of Christian Baptists was chosen. This body incorporated in April 1934 as the Ohio Valley Association of Christian Baptist Church of God.

In 2006, the Christian Baptist Church of God consisted of 35 churches, including congregations in the states of Kentucky, Michigan, Ohio, and West Virginia.

In 2018, the Christian Baptist Church of God consisted of 25 churches, including congregation in the states of Kentucky, Michigan, Ohio, and West Virginia.

The churches of the Ohio Valley Association of Christian Baptist Churches of God are divided into five districts: Central, North, South, East, and West Virginia

== See also ==
- Holiness Baptist Association
