= 1876 United States presidential election in Kentucky =

- November 7, 1876
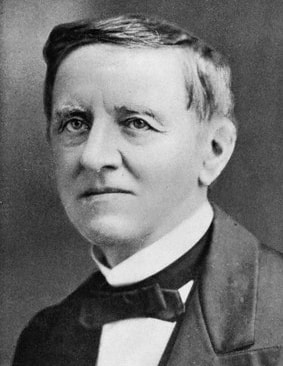

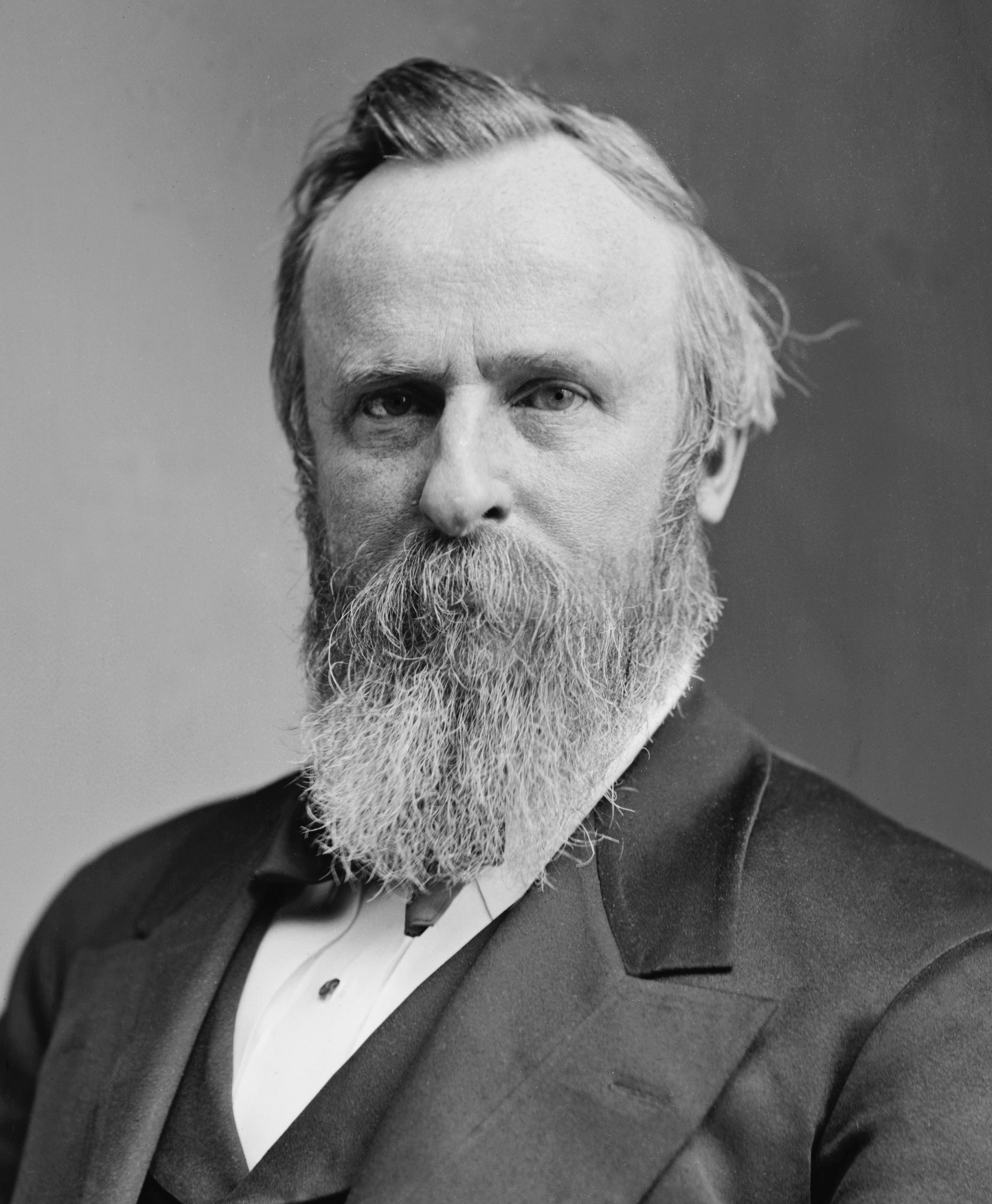
Nominee	Samuel J. Tilden	Rutherford B. Hayes
Party	Democratic	Republican
Home state	New York	Ohio
Running mate	Thomas A. Hendricks	William A. Wheeler
Electoral vote	12	0
Popular vote	160,060	97,568
Percentage	61.41%	37.44%
County results
Tilden
40–50%
50–60%
60–70%
70–80%
80–90%
Hayes
30–40%
50–60%
60–70%
70–80%
President before election
Ulysses S. Grant
Republican
Elected President
Rutherford B. Hayes
Republican

The 1876 United States presidential election in Kentucky took place on November 7, 1876, as part of the 1876 United States presidential election. Voters chose twelve representatives, or electors, to the Electoral College, who voted for president and vice president.

The Civil War would shape Kentucky politically for not merely the rest of the nineteenth century but also for the twentieth by creating entrenched divisions between secessionist, Democratic counties and Unionist, Republican ones. The southern cultural hegemony meant the state as a whole leaned Democratic throughout the Third Party System and the GOP would never carry the state during that era at either the presidential or gubernatorial level.

Kentucky had been one of only six states to vote against popular incumbent Ulysses S. Grant in 1872, and the effects of an economic downturn meant that Democratic nominees Samuel J. Tilden and Thomas A. Hendricks increased their margin by nineteen points. Kentucky would prove Tilden's fourth-strongest state behind Georgia, Texas and Mississippi. Only Lyndon Johnson in 1964, Richard Nixon in 1972, and Donald Trump in 2016, 2020, and 2024 have since exceeded Tilden's percentage for either party in Kentucky.

As of the 2024 presidential election, this is the last occasion when Lewis County voted for a Democratic presidential candidate.

== Results ==
Presidential Candidate	Running Mate	Party	Electoral Vote (EV)	Popular Vote (PV)	
Samuel J. Tilden of New York	Thomas A. Hendricks	Democratic	12	160,060	61.41%
Rutherford B. Hayes	William A. Wheeler	Republican	0	97,568	37.44%
—	—	Write-ins	0	2,998	1.15%

=== Results by county ===
County	Samuel J. Tilden Democratic		Rutherford B. Hayes Republican		Peter Cooper Greenback		Green C. Smith Prohibition		Margin		Total votes cast
County	#	%	#	%	#	%	#	%	#	%	Total votes cast
Adair	1,176	52.52%	1,062	47.43%	0	0.00%	1	0.04%	114	5.09%	2,239
Allen	1,064	62.11%	649	37.89%	0	0.00%	0	0.00%	415	24.23%	1,713
Anderson	1,154	69.31%	509	30.57%	0	0.00%	2	0.12%	645	38.74%	1,665
Ballard	2,061	85.70%	343	14.26%	0	0.00%	1	0.04%	1,718	71.43%	2,405
Barren	2,185	62.29%	1,309	37.31%	14	0.40%	0	0.00%	876	24.97%	3,508
Bath	1,123	57.33%	831	42.42%	5	0.26%	0	0.00%	292	14.91%	1,959
Bell	234	33.72%	458	65.99%	0	0.00%	2	0.29%	-224	-32.28%	694
Boone	1,802	81.54%	408	18.46%	0	0.00%	0	0.00%	1,394	63.08%	2,210
Bourbon	1,761	52.16%	1,615	47.84%	0	0.00%	0	0.00%	146	4.32%	3,376
Boyd	1,059	54.50%	884	45.50%	0	0.00%	0	0.00%	175	9.01%	1,943
Boyle	1,434	54.80%	1,176	44.94%	0	0.00%	7	0.27%	258	9.86%	2,617
Bracken	1,575	70.41%	634	28.34%	10	0.45%	18	0.80%	941	42.07%	2,237
Breathitt	687	66.06%	351	33.75%	0	0.00%	2	0.19%	336	32.31%	1,040
Breckinridge	1,357	62.16%	800	36.65%	0	0.00%	26	1.19%	557	25.52%	2,183
Bullitt	1,017	78.11%	262	20.12%	6	0.46%	17	1.31%	755	57.99%	1,302
Butler	449	30.69%	557	38.07%	457	31.24%	0	0.00%	-100	-6.83%	1,463
Caldwell	1,199	60.92%	752	38.21%	2	0.10%	15	0.76%	447	22.71%	1,968
Calloway	1,647	84.55%	246	12.63%	55	2.82%	0	0.00%	1,401	71.92%	1,948
Campbell	2,949	56.14%	2,304	43.86%	0	0.00%	0	0.00%	645	12.28%	5,253
Carroll	1,289	82.42%	275	17.58%	0	0.00%	0	0.00%	1,014	64.83%	1,564
Carter	763	51.69%	713	48.31%	0	0.00%	0	0.00%	50	3.39%	1,476
Casey	541	51.72%	469	44.84%	0	0.00%	36	3.44%	72	6.88%	1,046
Christian	2,062	42.04%	2,842	57.94%	0	0.00%	1	0.02%	-780	-15.90%	4,905
Clark	1,356	56.62%	1,025	42.80%	10	0.42%	4	0.17%	331	13.82%	2,395
Clay	821	47.24%	910	52.36%	0	0.00%	7	0.40%	-89	-5.12%	1,738
Clinton	342	39.36%	498	57.31%	27	3.11%	2	0.23%	-156	-17.95%	869
Crittenden	944	49.37%	931	48.69%	30	1.57%	7	0.37%	13	0.68%	1,912
Cumberland	596	49.22%	614	50.70%	0	0.00%	1	0.08%	-18	-1.49%	1,211
Daviess	3,285	72.85%	1,050	23.29%	162	3.59%	12	0.27%	2,235	49.57%	4,509
Edmonson	479	53.88%	396	44.54%	14	1.57%	0	0.00%	83	9.34%	889
Elliott	739	83.79%	141	15.99%	0	0.00%	2	0.23%	598	67.80%	882
Estill	895	56.79%	658	41.75%	0	0.00%	23	1.46%	237	15.04%	1,576
Fayette	2,963	48.89%	3,085	50.90%	0	0.00%	13	0.21%	-122	-2.01%	6,061
Fleming	1,534	57.76%	1,112	41.87%	0	0.00%	10	0.38%	422	15.89%	2,656
Floyd	927	76.67%	282	23.33%	0	0.00%	0	0.00%	645	53.35%	1,209
Franklin	1,989	64.20%	1,084	34.99%	0	0.00%	25	0.81%	905	29.21%	3,098
Fulton	1,037	87.36%	148	12.47%	0	0.00%	2	0.17%	889	74.89%	1,187
Gallatin	678	74.02%	238	25.98%	0	0.00%	0	0.00%	440	48.03%	916
Garrard	1,136	49.98%	1,135	49.93%	0	0.00%	2	0.09%	1	0.04%	2,273
Grant	1,297	63.95%	719	35.45%	0	0.00%	12	0.59%	578	28.50%	2,028
Graves	2,985	76.13%	926	23.62%	0	0.00%	10	0.26%	2,059	52.51%	3,921
Grayson	1,068	57.61%	613	33.06%	164	8.85%	9	0.49%	455	24.54%	1,854
Green	951	55.81%	741	43.49%	7	0.41%	5	0.29%	210	12.32%	1,704
Greenup	1,020	50.37%	979	48.35%	25	1.23%	1	0.05%	41	2.02%	2,025
Hancock	810	79.33%	205	20.08%	0	0.00%	6	0.59%	605	59.26%	1,021
Hardin	2,135	72.18%	813	27.48%	0	0.00%	10	0.34%	1,322	44.69%	2,958
Harlan	179	22.72%	608	77.16%	0	0.00%	1	0.13%	-429	-54.44%	788
Harrison	1,915	65.60%	988	33.85%	0	0.00%	16	0.55%	927	31.76%	2,919
Hart	1,584	60.25%	1,031	39.22%	9	0.34%	5	0.19%	553	21.03%	2,629
Henderson	2,592	62.84%	1,524	36.95%	6	0.15%	3	0.07%	1,068	25.89%	4,125
Henry	1,862	69.30%	820	30.52%	0	0.00%	5	0.19%	1,042	38.78%	2,687
Hickman	1,317	77.52%	381	22.42%	0	0.00%	1	0.06%	936	55.09%	1,699
Hopkins	1,859	64.50%	952	33.03%	68	2.36%	3	0.10%	907	31.47%	2,882
Jackson	281	32.49%	576	66.59%	0	0.00%	8	0.92%	-295	-34.10%	865
Jefferson	14,656	71.10%	5,905	28.65%	0	0.00%	51	0.25%	8,751	42.46%	20,612
Jessamine	1,142	51.05%	1,086	48.55%	2	0.09%	7	0.31%	56	2.50%	2,237
Johnson	559	44.05%	707	55.71%	3	0.24%	0	0.00%	-148	-11.66%	1,269
Kenton	4,185	62.86%	2,440	36.65%	9	0.14%	24	0.36%	1,745	26.21%	6,658
Knox	651	41.73%	889	56.99%	8	0.51%	12	0.77%	-238	-15.26%	1,560
Larue	978	69.86%	422	30.14%	0	0.00%	0	0.00%	556	39.71%	1,400
Laurel	560	44.91%	660	52.93%	0	0.00%	27	2.17%	-100	-8.02%	1,247
Lawrence	1,048	63.02%	615	36.98%	0	0.00%	0	0.00%	433	26.04%	1,663
Lee	352	48.89%	367	50.97%	0	0.00%	1	0.14%	-15	-2.08%	720
Letcher	412	53.09%	364	46.91%	0	0.00%	0	0.00%	48	6.19%	776
Lewis	1,147	50.28%	1,134	49.72%	0	0.00%	0	0.00%	13	0.57%	2,281
Lincoln	1,547	59.43%	1,047	40.22%	2	0.08%	7	0.27%	500	19.21%	2,603
Livingston	1,073	79.42%	255	18.87%	23	1.70%	0	0.00%	818	60.55%	1,351
Logan	2,242	59.02%	1,557	40.98%	0	0.00%	0	0.00%	685	18.03%	3,799
Lyon	781	61.74%	484	38.26%	0	0.00%	0	0.00%	297	23.48%	1,265
Madison	2,236	52.95%	1,967	46.58%	0	0.00%	20	0.47%	269	6.37%	4,223
Magoffin	489	52.81%	436	47.08%	0	0.00%	1	0.11%	53	5.72%	926
Marion	1,632	66.21%	827	33.55%	2	0.08%	4	0.16%	805	32.66%	2,465
Marshall	1,311	85.30%	217	14.12%	0	0.00%	9	0.59%	1,094	71.18%	1,537
Martin	94	28.48%	235	71.21%	0	0.00%	1	0.30%	-141	-42.73%	330
Mason	2,362	60.64%	1,518	38.97%	0	0.00%	15	0.39%	844	21.67%	3,895
McCracken	1,756	65.06%	943	34.94%	0	0.00%	0	0.00%	813	30.12%	2,699
McLean	799	58.41%	306	22.37%	263	19.23%	0	0.00%	493	36.04%	1,368
Meade	1,227	80.62%	258	16.95%	35	2.30%	2	0.13%	969	63.67%	1,522
Menifee	401	78.47%	109	21.33%	0	0.00%	1	0.20%	292	57.14%	511
Mercer	1,659	59.10%	1,131	40.29%	0	0.00%	17	0.61%	528	18.81%	2,807
Metcalfe	718	51.69%	669	48.16%	0	0.00%	2	0.14%	49	3.53%	1,389
Monroe	590	46.17%	664	51.96%	24	1.88%	0	0.00%	-74	-5.79%	1,278
Montgomery	1,213	58.09%	869	41.62%	0	0.00%	6	0.29%	344	16.48%	2,088
Morgan	1,022	75.31%	335	24.69%	0	0.00%	0	0.00%	687	50.63%	1,357
Muhlenberg	1,159	53.83%	950	44.12%	42	1.95%	2	0.09%	209	9.71%	2,153
Nelson	1,782	67.99%	815	31.10%	3	0.11%	21	0.80%	967	36.89%	2,621
Nicholas	1,315	62.95%	762	36.48%	0	0.00%	12	0.57%	553	26.47%	2,089
Ohio	1,589	54.85%	1,114	38.45%	168	5.80%	26	0.90%	475	16.40%	2,897
Oldham	956	68.33%	424	30.31%	17	1.22%	2	0.14%	532	38.03%	1,399
Owen	2,700	87.10%	398	12.84%	0	0.00%	2	0.06%	2,302	74.26%	3,100
Owsley	215	28.98%	526	70.89%	0	0.00%	1	0.13%	-311	-41.91%	742
Pendleton	1,686	64.65%	920	35.28%	0	0.00%	2	0.08%	766	29.37%	2,608
Perry	326	34.83%	610	65.17%	0	0.00%	0	0.00%	-284	-30.34%	936
Pike	947	66.74%	429	30.23%	0	0.00%	43	3.03%	518	36.50%	1,419
Powell	344	57.91%	250	42.09%	0	0.00%	0	0.00%	94	15.82%	594
Pulaski	1,652	44.87%	1,981	53.80%	0	0.00%	49	1.33%	-329	-8.94%	3,682
Robertson	689	65.12%	359	33.93%	3	0.28%	7	0.66%	330	31.19%	1,058
Rockcastle	824	51.34%	776	48.35%	1	0.06%	4	0.25%	48	2.99%	1,605
Rowan	247	45.32%	298	54.68%	0	0.00%	0	0.00%	-51	-9.36%	545
Russell	647	55.06%	528	44.94%	0	0.00%	0	0.00%	119	10.13%	1,175
Scott	1,827	57.73%	1,322	41.77%	0	0.00%	16	0.51%	505	15.96%	3,165
Shelby	2,135	63.35%	1,210	35.91%	7	0.21%	18	0.53%	925	27.45%	3,370
Simpson	1,272	66.91%	597	31.40%	10	0.53%	22	1.16%	675	35.51%	1,901
Spencer	881	73.29%	320	26.62%	1	0.08%	0	0.00%	561	46.67%	1,202
Taylor	990	67.72%	471	32.22%	0	0.00%	1	0.07%	519	35.50%	1,462
Todd	1,395	53.24%	1,215	46.37%	8	0.31%	2	0.08%	180	6.87%	2,620
Trigg	1,508	60.08%	994	39.60%	7	0.28%	1	0.04%	514	20.48%	2,510
Trimble	1,058	90.20%	114	9.72%	0	0.00%	1	0.09%	944	80.48%	1,173
Union	2,200	75.81%	654	22.54%	46	1.59%	2	0.07%	1,546	53.27%	2,902
Warren	2,652	56.91%	1,899	40.75%	99	2.12%	10	0.21%	753	16.16%	4,660
Washington	1,428	58.31%	1,014	41.40%	0	0.00%	7	0.29%	414	16.90%	2,449
Wayne	1,050	59.06%	694	39.03%	33	1.86%	1	0.06%	356	20.02%	1,778
Webster	1,270	69.63%	491	26.92%	55	3.02%	8	0.44%	779	42.71%	1,824
Whitley	487	32.82%	987	66.51%	0	0.00%	10	0.67%	-500	-33.69%	1,484
Wolfe	531	66.21%	270	33.67%	0	0.00%	1	0.12%	261	32.54%	802
Woodford	1,340	55.19%	1,080	44.48%	1	0.04%	7	0.29%	260	10.71%	2,428
Totals	160,108	61.49%	97,520	37.45%	1,943	0.75%	818	0.31%	62,588	24.04%	260,389

== See also ==
- United States presidential elections in Kentucky
