= Mount Carmel, Kentucky =

Unincorporated community in Kentucky, United States

- Unincorporated community
- Location within Kentucky
- Coordinates: 38°29′4″N 83°38′12″W
- Country: United States
- State: Kentucky
- County: Fleming
- Elevation: 883 ft (269 m)
- Time zone: UTC-5 (Eastern (EST))
  - Summer (DST): UTC-4 (EDT)
- ZIP Code: 41093
- Area code: 606
- GNIS feature ID: 507313

Mount Carmel is an unincorporated community in Fleming County, Kentucky, in the United States.

== History ==
Mount Carmel was incorporated in 1825. A post office was established at Mount Carmel in 1829, and remained in operation until it was discontinued in 1932.
