= Firebrick, Kentucky =

Unincorporated community in Kentucky, United States

- Unincorporated community
- Location in Kentucky Location in the United States
- Coordinates: 38°41′15″N 83°2′50″W
- Country: United States
- State: Kentucky
- County: Lewis
- Elevation: 587 ft (179 m)
- Time zone: UTC-5 (Eastern (EST))
  - Summer (DST): UTC-4 (EST)
- ZIP codes: 41137
- GNIS feature ID: 492090

Firebrick is an unincorporated community in Lewis County, Kentucky, United States. The Firebrick post office, opened in 1892 with postmaster William Beyerly, closed in January 2004

It was named for a local brickworks that is no longer in operation.
