= Crum, Kentucky =

Unincorporated community in Kentucky, United States

- Unincorporated community
- Location in Kentucky Location in the United States
- Coordinates: 38°27′35″N 83°27′2″W
- Country: United States
- State: Kentucky
- County: Lewis
- Elevation: 787 ft (240 m)
- Time zone: UTC-5 (Eastern (EST))
  - Summer (DST): UTC-4 (EST)
- GNIS feature ID: 511665

Crum is an unincorporated community in Lewis County, Kentucky, United States.

The origins of the name Crum is unclear. A post office was established in 1882, and closed in 1924.
