= Saint Paul, Lewis County, Kentucky =

Unincorporated community in Kentucky, United States

Saint Paul, Kentucky
- Unincorporated community
- Location within Kentucky Location within the United States
- Coordinates: 38°40′15″N 83°05′14″W
- Country: United States
- State: Kentucky
- County: Lewis
- Elevation: 541 ft (165 m)
- Time zone: UTC-5 (Eastern (EST))
  - Summer (DST): UTC-4 (EDT)
- ZIP code: 41166
- Area code: 606
- GNIS feature ID: 502713

Saint Paul is an unincorporated community in Lewis County, Kentucky, United States. The community is located on Kentucky Route 8 and the Ohio River 6.5 miles (10.5 km) southwest of Portsmouth, Ohio.
