= Triplett, Kentucky =

Unincorporated community in Kentucky, United States

Triplett
- Unincorporated community
- Location within the state of Kentucky Triplett (the United States)
- Coordinates: 38°17′36″N 83°23′47″W
- Country: United States
- State: Kentucky
- County: Rowan
- Elevation: 820 ft (250 m)
- Time zone: UTC-5 (Eastern (EST))
  - Summer (DST): UTC-4 (EDT)
- GNIS feature ID: 516022

Triplett is an unincorporated community located in Rowan County, Kentucky, United States.
