= Rugless, Kentucky =

Unincorporated community in Kentucky, United States

- Unincorporated community
- Location in Kentucky Location in the United States
- Coordinates: 38°29′22″N 83°12′38″W
- Country: United States
- State: Kentucky
- County: Lewis
- Elevation: 702 ft (214 m)
- Time zone: UTC-5 (Eastern (EST))
  - Summer (DST): UTC-4 (EST)
- GNIS feature ID: 508986

Rugless is an unincorporated community in Lewis County, Kentucky, United States. The Rugless post office is closed.

Rugless is a corruption of either Ruglas or Ruggles, the surname of an early settler.
