= Holiness Baptist Association =

Holiness Pentecostal body of Christians with Baptist historical roots

The Holiness Baptist Association is a Holiness Pentecostal body of Christians with Baptist historical roots.

== Holiness movement ==
In 19th-century America, the Holiness movement developed out of the Methodist emphasis of the Wesleyan teachings of holiness. John Wesley taught that holiness (also known as entire sanctification or Christian perfection), was a definite and instantaneous second work of grace received by faith. Methodists, including those in the holiness movement, equated entire sanctification with baptism of the Holy Spirit.

Early in the 20th century, some in the Holiness movement also embraced Pentecostalism, which taught a third work of grace, whose outward sign was speaking in tongues. Holiness Pentecostals taught that it was the third work of grace, not the second work of grace, that was the baptism of the Holy Spirit. Those in the holiness movement (such as the Free Methodist Church and Church of the Nazarene) were critical of the Holiness Pentecostals for this reason and rejected the Parhamian-Seymourian doctrine of speaking in tongues. The following bodies have primary roots in the Holiness movement and secondary roots in Pentecostalism.

== Holiness Baptists in Georgia ==
The holiness movement among Baptists in south Georgia began late in the 19th century in Wilcox County among ministers in the Little River Baptist Association. At the annual session of the association in 1893, fellowship was withdrawn from two churches "because of their doctrine of holiness or carnal perfection".¹ The two excluded churches and two newly formed churches met in 1894 to organize the Holiness Baptist Association. The association was organized upon the same articles of faith and rules of decorum as the Little River Association. In 1905, the association adopted new articles of faith and decorum, bringing their statements in line with their holiness beliefs. More changes were made to the articles and decorum in 1916. They have since remained relatively the same. In 1916, the Holiness Baptists agreed to form two separate associations, and continued in that manner until they consolidated in 1925. A periodical called The Gospel Standard was started in 1918 by J. N. Salter, and has continued as the Holiness Baptist Association publication to the present. Over the years the Holiness Baptists of Georgia moved away from Baptist polity, proceeding through a Presbyterian form to a Methodist form of government, while gradually including Pentecostal distinctives, such as speaking in tongues, within their services. Their greatest period of growth was from 1905 to 1945, after which they began to decline. In 1949, the association built a camp ground and tabernacle in Coffee County near Douglas, Georgia. Annual meetings of the association are held at the tabernacle. There is one member church in Florida.

In 1934, the Baptist Purity Association was formed by members excluded from the Holiness Baptist Association for teaching and practicing the substitution of water for grape juice in the Lord's supper.

In 1977, discontented members withdrew and formed the Calvary Holiness Association.

According to historian Robert G. Gardner of Mercer University in Macon, Georgia, these three Holiness Baptist bodies currently have about 50 churches with about 1,582 members. Like many other Holiness groups, they maintain strict standards of dress, require long hair for women and short hair for men, and abstain from tobacco, intoxicating beverages, dancing provocatively, gambling, television, etc.

== Holiness Baptist Churches of Southwestern Arkansas ==
William Jethro Walthall (1858–1931) was ordained as a Missionary Baptist preacher on May 29, 1887. In 1895 he became familiar with the holiness revival, and felt it spoke to what he believed he had already experienced. These teachings were at odds with the local Baptist teachings. Walthall was excluded from his church in 1896 and ostracized by the Red River Baptist Association. In 1899, minister J. C. Kelly and his church were excluded from the Red River Association. Walthall and Kelly continued to preach and formed new churches, mostly in southwestern Arkansas, but a few in Oklahoma Territory and Texas. By 1903 these churches had founded the Holiness Baptist Churches of Southwestern Arkansas. The first annual session was held November 6–8, 1903 at Sutton, Arkansas. This Holiness Baptist group continued until 1917. In that year, Walthall joined the Assemblies of God and brought all 36 congregations of the Holiness Baptist Churches of Southwestern Arkansas into the Assemblies of God.

== North Carolina and South Carolina ==
Early in the 19th century, Holiness Baptist churches at Greenville, South Carolina and Hendersonville, North Carolina corresponded with the Holiness Baptist Association of Georgia. A church at Burlington, North Carolina was a member of the Georgia association for a few years. The status of these churches is unknown, though they likely were absorbed into other holiness or Pentecostal bodies.

== Kentucky and Tennessee ==
The Church of God Mountain Assembly, though not named Holiness Baptist, began as a holiness movement among Baptists. It was formed in 1907 by ministers and churches excluded from the South Union Association of United Baptists for preaching holiness and the danger of apostasy. The Church of God Mountain Assembly corresponded with the Holiness Baptist Association of Georgia early in the 20th century.

== See also ==
- Ohio Valley Association of the Christian Baptist Churches of God
