= Kinniconick, Kentucky =

Unincorporated community in Kentucky, United States

- Unincorporated community
- Location in Kentucky Location in the United States
- Coordinates: 38°31′16″N 83°20′17″W
- Country: United States
- State: Kentucky
- County: Lewis
- Elevation: 686 ft (209 m)
- Time zone: UTC-5 (Eastern (EST))
  - Summer (DST): UTC-4 (EST)
- GNIS feature ID: 495779

Kinniconick is an unincorporated community in Lewis County, Kentucky, United States, that sets along the bank of Kinniconick Creek, a prevalent creek which flows for nearly 100 miles through the county. Found listed on French explorer maps as “Connoconoque,” the name “Kinniconick” is believed to be of Shawnee origin, either meaning “willow bark,” or referring to the supposed Shawnee word for a kind of tobacco, a mixture of aromatic leaves and bark. However, this is not certain. As settlers followed and opened up the West, the creek became known as Kinniconick. The Kinniconick post office is closed. The Kinniconick School is also closed. It served grades 1st-8th and was closed in 1984. The Kinniconick mascot was the Eagles and their colors were yellow (maize), black, and white.
