= Vanceburg, Kentucky =

- City
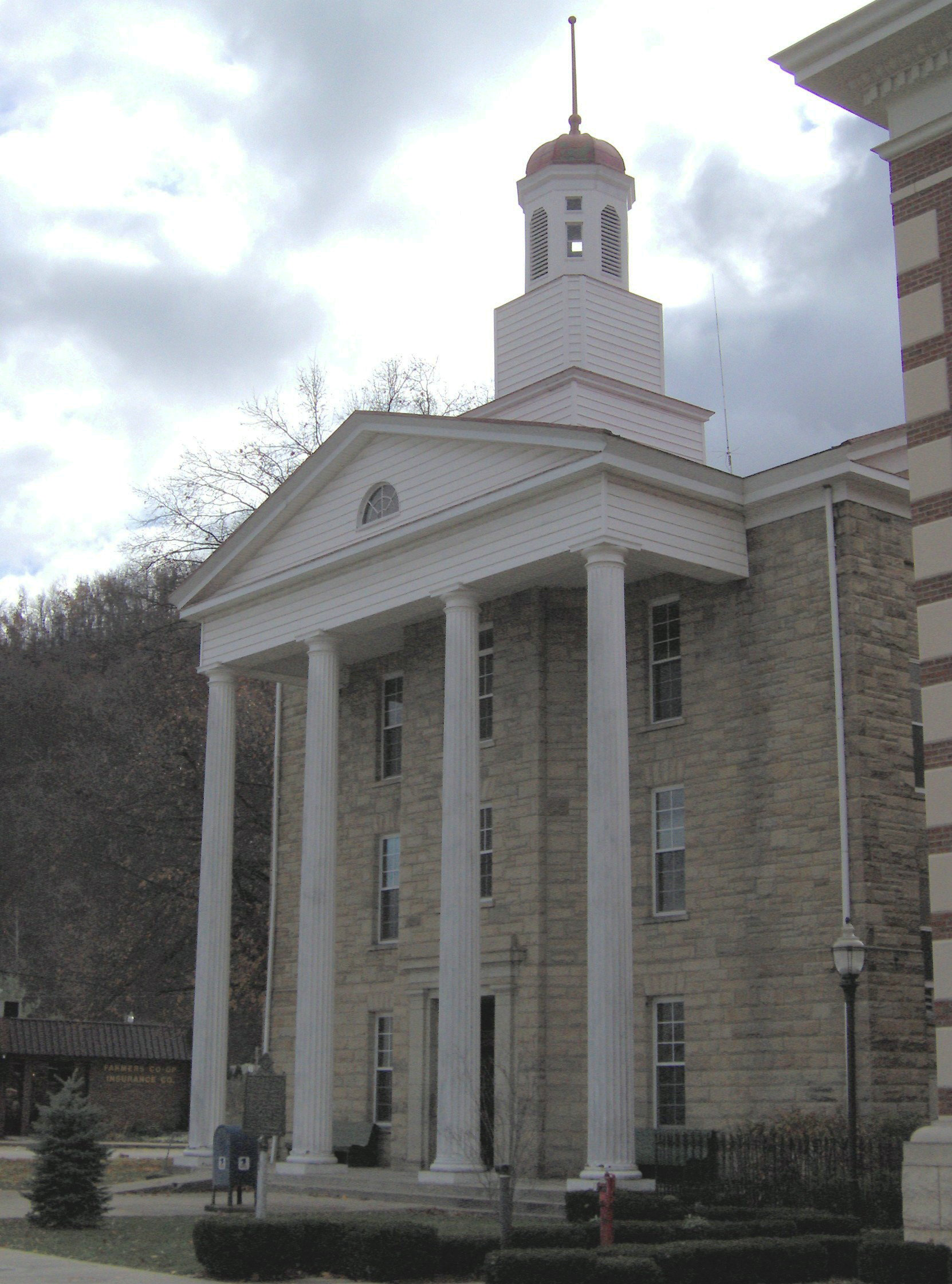
- Lewis County courthouse in Vanceburg

- Location in Lewis County, Kentucky
- Coordinates: 38°35′40″N 83°19′28″W
- Country: United States
- State: Kentucky
- County: Lewis

Government
  - Type: Mayor–council government
  - Mayor: Dana Blankenship

Area
  - Total: 1.50 sq mi (3.88 km^{2})
  - Land: 1.45 sq mi (3.75 km^{2})
  - Water: 0.050 sq mi (0.13 km^{2})
- Elevation: 495 ft (151 m)

Population (2020)
  - Total: 1,428
  - Estimate (2022): 1,401
  - Density: 985.8/sq mi (380.62/km^{2})
- Time zone: UTC-5 (Eastern (EST))
  - Summer (DST): UTC-4 (EDT)
- ZIP code: 41179
- Area code: 606
- FIPS code: 21-79068
- GNIS feature ID: 2405638
- Website: www.cityofvanceburg.com

Vanceburg is a home rule-class city in Lewis County, Kentucky, United States, along the Ohio River. The population was 1,428 at the 2020 census. It is the county seat of Lewis County.

Vanceburg is part of the Maysville Micropolitan Statistical Area.

== Geography ==
Vanceburg is located in northern Lewis County on the south bank of the Ohio River. Kentucky Route 9/10, the AA Highway, runs through the southern part of the city, leading west 16 miles (26 km) to Tollesboro. To the east KY 10 and the Greenup spur of the AA Highway lead east 29 miles (47 km) to the Ohio River at the Jesse Stuart Memorial Bridge near Lloyd, while KY 9 and the Grayson spur of the AA Highway lead southeast 30 miles (48 km) to Interstate 64 at Grayson. Kentucky Route 8 also runs through Vanceburg, closer to the center of town. It leads northwest (downstream) along the Ohio River 13 miles (21 km) to Concord and east (upstream) 9 miles (14 km) to Garrison.

According to the United States Census Bureau, Vanceburg has a total area of 1.2 square miles (3.2 km^{2}), of which 0.04 square miles (0.1 km^{2}), or 3.45%, are water.

=== Climate ===
The climate in this area is characterized by hot, humid summers and generally mild to cool winters. According to the Köppen Climate Classification system, Vanceburg has a humid subtropical climate, abbreviated "Cfa" on climate maps.

== History ==
Founded in 1797, Vanceburg is named for a cofounder of the city, William Vance. Joseph Baird and William Vance received land rights and divided the area into parcels for sale. While Baird was the header of the project, the two agreed that a coin toss would settle who the town would be named after. Baird won the toss and the name “Bairdstown” was decided upon. However, the two soon decided that “Bairdstown” too closely resembled the already established city of Bardstown, Kentucky. After reaching this conclusion the pair settled on the name "Vanceburg". The city and surrounding area originally thrived on salt productions and mines located along and in Salt Lick Creek, which flows through the city and inland through much of the heart of the county. Vanceburg was once a thriving production city, with a small train station and a bustling downtown area. In 1937 the city was flooded, as were many cities along the river, which crested at 75 feet (23 m). A crest mark could once be found marked on the old Lock and Dam building west of Vanceburg on KY 8 but is no longer visible. During the flood all of downtown Vanceburg was under water. As a result, 1st Street of Vanceburg was washed into the river. The section of bank on which the homes and businesses once sat slid into the raging stream. Now, one will notice that there is no "1st Street" in the city, only "Front Street". The city streets were renamed according to their order back from Front Street. Front Street now is the nearest street to the river and sits nearly directly on the river bank.

== Demographics ==
Historical population
Census	Pop.	Note	%±
1870	513		—
1880	1,095		113.5%
1890	1,110		1.4%
1900	1,161		4.6%
1910	1,145		−1.4%
1920	1,353		18.2%
1930	1,388		2.6%
1940	1,184		−14.7%
1950	1,528		29.1%
1960	1,881		23.1%
1970	1,773		−5.7%
1980	1,939		9.4%
1990	1,713		−11.7%
2000	1,731		1.1%
2010	1,518		−12.3%
2020	1,428		−5.9%
2022 (est.)	1,401		−1.9%
U.S. Decennial Census

As of the census of 2000, there were 1,731 people, 672 households, and 411 families residing in the city. The population density was 1,502.4 inhabitants per square mile (580.1/km^{2}). There were 752 housing units at an average density of 652.7 per square mile (252.0/km^{2}). The racial makeup of the city was 98.38% White, 0.64% African American, 0.17% Native American, 0.06% Asian, 0.06% from other races, and 0.69% from two or more races. Hispanic or Latino of any race were 0.17% of the population.

There were 672 households, out of which 29.3% had children under the age of 18 living with them, 40.9% were married couples living together, 15.5% had a female householder with no husband present, and 38.7% were non-families. 35.9% of all households were made up of individuals, and 15.9% had someone living alone who was 65 years of age or older. The average household size was 2.29 and the average family size was 2.93.

In the city, the population was spread out, with 22.8% under the age of 18, 10.7% from 18 to 24, 28.2% from 25 to 44, 20.7% from 45 to 64, and 17.7% who were 65 years of age or older. The median age was 37 years. For every 100 females, there were 94.9 males. For every 100 females age 18 and over, there were 89.6 males.

The median income for a household in the city was $15,938, and the median income for a family was $20,000. Males had a median income of $18,409 versus $18,750 for females. The per capita income for the city was $9,275. About 32.9% of families and 37.6% of the population were below the poverty line, including 50.4% of those under age 18 and 27.8% of those age 65 or over.

In 2010, Vanceburg had the 23rd-lowest median household income of all places in the United States with a population over 1,000.

== Education ==
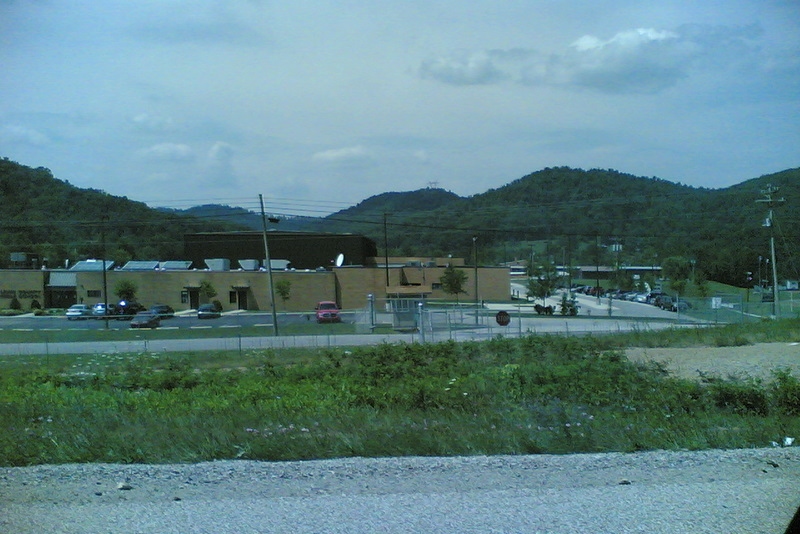
A view of the Lewis County Middle School near Vanceburg from KY 10

The residents of Lewis County are served by the Lewis County Schools. The main complex is located west of Vanceburg on KY 10. There are four elementary schools still in operation within the county. They are Lewis County Central Elementary, located in Vanceburg, Garrison Elementary, located east of Vanceburg in the town of Garrison, Tollesboro Elementary, located west of Vanceburg in the town of Tollesboro, and Laurel Elementary, located south east of Vanceburg in the Laurel area of Lewis County. Upon entering 7th grade all 7th grade students attend Lewis County Middle School located west of Vanceburg on KY 10. LCMS hosts two grade levels, 7th and 8th. Up until the 2019 school year the school also hosted 6th grade from students in Vanceburg. However, 6th grade will be moving to the newly completed Lewis County Central Elementary building on the same grounds as the original building. Upon completing 8th grade students attend Lewis County High School, which sets adjacent to the middle school. LCHS hosts grades 9-12 and was a nationally distinguished school in 2015, 2016, and 2018.

Vanceburg has a lending library, the Lewis County Public Library.

== Notable people ==
- James Baird, University of Michigan Quarterback and prominent engineer.
- Ralph Davis, basketball player
- Faith Esham, performer (opera) and recitalist
- Thomas Massie, congressman
- Thomas H. Paynter, U.S. senator, 1907–1913

== See also ==
- List of cities and towns along the Ohio River
- Union Monument in Vanceburg
