= Lewis County, Kentucky =

County in Kentucky, United States

- County
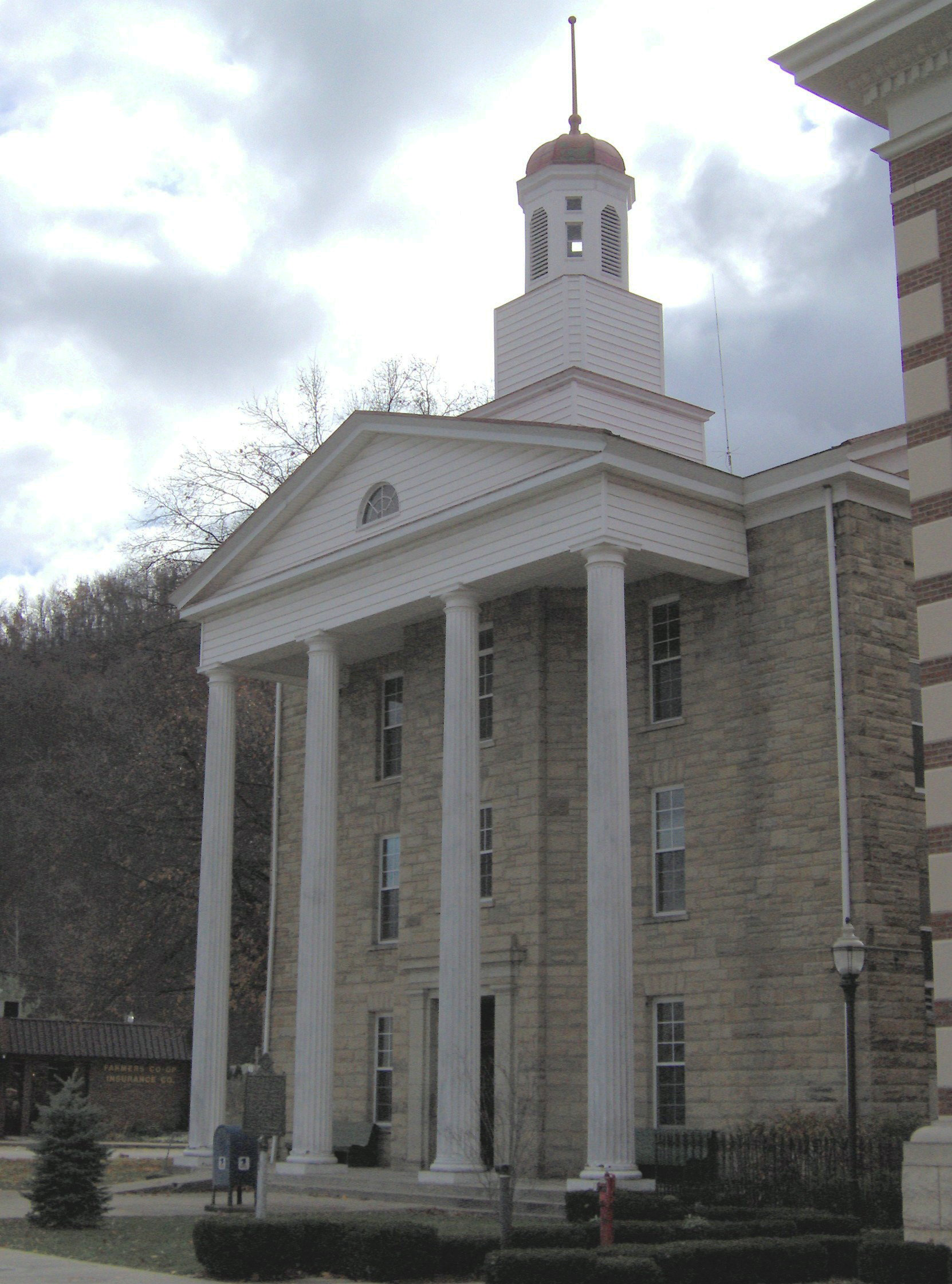
- Lewis County courthouse in Vanceburg

- Location within the U.S. state of Kentucky
- Coordinates: 38°32′N 83°23′W
- Country: United States
- State: Kentucky
- Founded: December 2, 1806
- Named for: Meriwether Lewis
- Seat: Vanceburg
- Largest city: Vanceburg

Government
  - Judge/Executive: George Sparks (R)

Area
  - Total: 495 sq mi (1,280 km^{2})
  - Land: 483 sq mi (1,250 km^{2})
  - Water: 13 sq mi (34 km^{2}) 2.5%

Population (2020)
  - Total: 13,080
  - Estimate (2025): 12,901 ▼
  - Density: 27.1/sq mi (10.5/km^{2})
- Time zone: UTC−5 (Eastern)
  - Summer (DST): UTC−4 (EDT)
- Congressional district: 4th
- Website: lewiscountyky.gov

Lewis County is near the northeastern tip of the U.S. state of Kentucky. As of the 2020 census, the population was 13,080. Its county seat is Vanceburg.

== History ==
Kentucky was part of Virginia until 1792. The District of Kentucky began with three counties: Fayette, Jefferson and Lincoln and Fayette. Part of Fayette County was split off as Bourbon County in 1785; a portion of Bourbon was split off in 1788 as Mason County; in 1806 Lewis County was split off from Mason and named for Meriwether Lewis of the Lewis and Clark Expedition.

The county's elevation ranges from 485 to 1400 feet above sea level. Its heavily forested hills and hollows have produced some of the nation's best oak lumber. Lumbering was long the county's principal economic activity; today the largest categories of employment are health care and social assistance (814 persons), construction (680) and manufacturing (600).

== Geography ==
According to the United States Census Bureau, the county has a total area of 495 square miles (1,280 km^{2}), of which 483 square miles (1,250 km^{2}) is land and 13 square miles (34 km^{2}) (2.5%) is water. The county's northern border with Ohio is formed by the Ohio River. Its border with the river is the longest of all the Kentucky counties.

=== Adjacent counties ===
- Adams County, Ohio (north)
- Scioto County, Ohio (northeast)
- Greenup County (east)
- Carter County (southeast)
- Rowan County (south)
- Fleming County (southwest)
- Mason County (west)

=== National protected area ===
- Ohio River Islands National Wildlife Refuge (part)

== Demographics ==
Historical population
Census	Pop.	Note	%±
1810	2,357		—
1820	3,973		68.6%
1830	5,229		31.6%
1840	6,306		20.6%
1850	7,202		14.2%
1860	8,361		16.1%
1870	9,115		9.0%
1880	13,154		44.3%
1890	14,803		12.5%
1900	17,868		20.7%
1910	16,887		−5.5%
1920	15,829		−6.3%
1930	14,315		−9.6%
1940	15,686		9.6%
1950	13,520		−13.8%
1960	13,115		−3.0%
1970	12,355		−5.8%
1980	14,545		17.7%
1990	13,029		−10.4%
2000	14,092		8.2%
2010	13,870		−1.6%
2020	13,080		−5.7%
2025 (est.)	12,901	▼	−1.4%
U.S. Decennial Census; 1790–1960 1900–1990; 1990–2000 2010–2020

=== 2020 census ===
As of the 2020 census, the county had a population of 13,080. The median age was 42.1 years. 23.9% of residents were under the age of 18 and 18.4% of residents were 65 years of age or older. For every 100 females there were 96.6 males, and for every 100 females age 18 and over there were 93.9 males age 18 and over.

The racial makeup of the county was 96.6% White, 0.3% Black or African American, 0.1% American Indian and Alaska Native, 0.1% Asian, 0.0% Native Hawaiian and Pacific Islander, 0.2% from some other race, and 2.7% from two or more races. Hispanic or Latino residents of any race comprised 0.6% of the population.

0.0% of residents lived in urban areas, while 100.0% lived in rural areas.

There were 5,239 households in the county, of which 30.6% had children under the age of 18 living with them and 25.7% had a female householder with no spouse or partner present. About 27.0% of all households were made up of individuals and 13.1% had someone living alone who was 65 years of age or older.

There were 6,023 housing units, of which 13.0% were vacant. Among occupied housing units, 76.9% were owner-occupied and 23.1% were renter-occupied. The homeowner vacancy rate was 1.5% and the rental vacancy rate was 6.5%.

=== 2000 census ===
As of the census of 2000, there were 14,092 people, 5,422 households, and 4,050 families residing in the county. The population density was 29 per square mile (11/km^{2}). There were 6,173 housing units at an average density of 13 per square mile (5.0/km^{2}). The racial makeup of the county was 98.92% White, 0.21% Black or African American, 0.21% Native American, 0.03% Asian, 0.09% from other races, and 0.55% from two or more races. 0.44% of the population were Hispanic or Latino of any race.

There were 5,422 households, out of which 35.10% had children under the age of 18 living with them, 60.40% were married couples living together, 9.70% had a female householder with no husband present, and 25.30% were non-families. 22.50% of all households were made up of individuals, and 10.00% had someone living alone who was 65 years of age or older. The average household size was 2.56 and the average family size was 2.98.

In the county, the population was spread out, with 25.30% under the age of 18, 9.10% from 18 to 24, 29.40% from 25 to 44, 23.70% from 45 to 64, and 12.50% who were 65 years of age or older. The median age was 36 years. For every 100 females, there were 99.00 males. For every 100 females age 18 and over, there were 97.00 males.

The median income for a household in the county was $22,208, and the median income for a family was $26,109. Males had a median income of $25,522 versus $18,764 for females. The per capita income for the county was $12,031. About 23.50% of families and 28.50% of the population were below the poverty line, including 36.40% of those under age 18 and 21.30% of those age 65 or over. Over forty percent of this county gets some kind of government benefit.

== Economy ==
=== Prosperity One ===
In October 2026, The Nuclear Company, a privately held American nuclear energy company, announced plans for a proposed 6.6-gigawatt nuclear energy campus, Prosperity One, along the Ohio River featuring up to six Westinghouse AP1000 reactors, generating more than the average power consumption of every home in Kentucky combined, and making this the first commercial nuclear project for Kentucky. The company aims to secure federal approvals to start construction in 2028, starting with two Westinghouse AP1000 reactors.

== Education ==
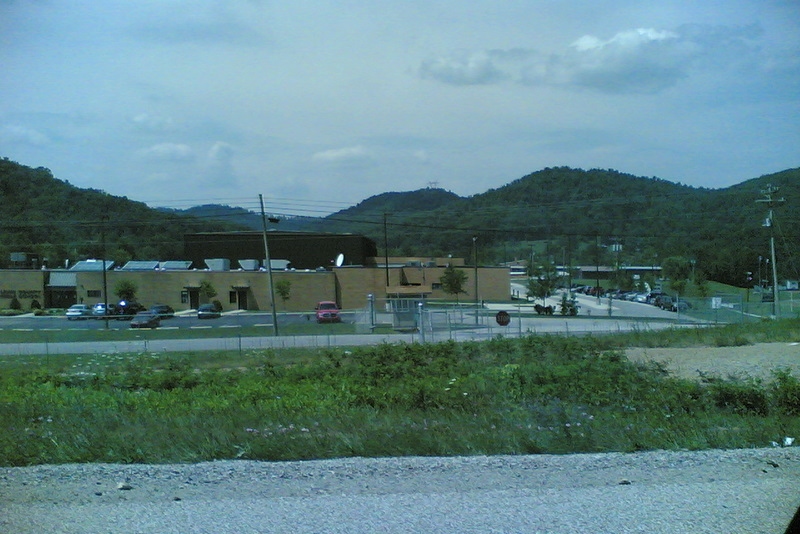
A view of the Lewis County Middle School near Vanceburg from KY 10

The residents of Lewis County are served by the Lewis County Schools. There are four elementary schools, a middle school for 7th and 8th graders, and an adjacent high school on KY 10, the AA Highway. The elementary schools are Lewis County Central in Vanceburg; Garrison Elementary, east of Vanceburg in the community of Garrison; Tollesboro Elementary, west of Vanceburg in the community of Tollesboro; and Laurel Elementary, southeast of Vanceburg. LCHS hwas a nationally distinguished school in 2015, 2016 and 2018.

Elementary Schools:

- Lewis County Central Elementary School, Vanceburg. Mascot-Lions, Colors-Royal blue, red, and white.
- Garrison Elementary School, Garrison. Mascot-Patriots, Colors-Red, black, and white.
- Tollesboro Elementary School, Tollesboro. Mascot-Wildcats, Colors-Royal blue, yellow, and white.
- Laurel Elementary School, Laurel. Mascot-Bombers, Colors-Kelly green and white.

Middle Schools:

- Lewis County Middle School, Vanceburg. Mascot-Lions, Colors-Royal blue, red, and white.

High Schools:

- Lewis County High School, Vanceburg. Mascot-Lions, Colors-Royal blue, red, and white.

Closed Schools:

- Tollesboro High School, Tollesboro. Closed in 1994 due to low enrollment and loss of state funding. This was an issue that caused controversy within the county as Tollesboro High and Lewis County High had a long-standing, bitter rivalry. Tollesboro officials and residents claimed that the closure of the school by the Lewis County Board of Education was not justified, and some went so far as to send their children to schools in surrounding counties, such as Mason and Fleming. However, with time, the controversy died down. The main Tollesboro school building and Field Hall, with a gymnasium, still stand just off of KY 57 near the intersection with old Highway 10. The building was for a short time used as the Tollesboro Christian Academy.
- Laurel High School, Laurel. The building burned in the late 1930s. It was made of local stone which was largely undamaged by the fire, so the exterior could have been reused, but the interior was burned beyond repair. Students in the Laurel area went to Lewis County High School. The building sat just off the intersection of KY 59 and highway 1068 (near Laurel Point). The remnants of the building are still visible today.

== Politics ==
United States presidential election results for Lewis County, Kentucky
Year	Republican		Democratic		Third party(ies)	
Year	No.	%	No.	%	No.	%
1836	345	53.32%	302	46.68%	0	0.00%
1840	523	61.97%	321	38.03%	0	0.00%
1844	506	48.24%	543	51.76%	0	0.00%
1848	521	47.93%	566	52.07%	0	0.00%
1852	400	44.05%	503	55.40%	5	0.55%
1856	0	0.00%	631	51.85%	586	48.15%
1860	31	2.79%	73	6.57%	1,007	90.64%
1864	645	62.26%	391	37.74%	0	0.00%
1868	983	55.16%	799	44.84%	0	0.00%
1872	952	59.65%	644	40.35%	0	0.00%
1876	1,134	49.72%	1,147	50.28%	0	0.00%
1880	1,388	54.28%	1,075	42.04%	94	3.68%
1884	1,498	55.94%	1,152	43.02%	28	1.05%
1888	1,880	57.02%	1,379	41.83%	38	1.15%
1892	1,531	53.36%	1,044	36.39%	294	10.25%
1896	2,348	61.29%	1,433	37.41%	50	1.31%
1900	2,311	60.01%	1,482	38.48%	58	1.51%
1904	2,374	62.74%	1,286	33.99%	124	3.28%
1908	2,549	65.26%	1,268	32.46%	89	2.28%
1912	1,185	34.52%	1,017	29.62%	1,231	35.86%
1916	2,324	62.66%	1,276	34.40%	109	2.94%
1920	4,186	71.84%	1,550	26.60%	91	1.56%
1924	3,067	65.13%	1,447	30.73%	195	4.14%
1928	4,077	78.36%	1,120	21.53%	6	0.12%
1932	3,212	55.88%	2,488	43.28%	48	0.84%
1936	3,255	61.92%	1,985	37.76%	17	0.32%
1940	3,371	64.22%	1,878	35.78%	0	0.00%
1944	3,275	69.43%	1,434	30.40%	8	0.17%
1948	2,708	64.68%	1,449	34.61%	30	0.72%
1952	3,317	67.86%	1,556	31.83%	15	0.31%
1956	3,333	67.65%	1,585	32.17%	9	0.18%
1960	3,816	69.41%	1,682	30.59%	0	0.00%
1964	2,300	50.58%	2,230	49.04%	17	0.37%
1968	2,760	64.83%	1,017	23.89%	480	11.28%
1972	3,124	71.57%	1,200	27.49%	41	0.94%
1976	2,383	55.01%	1,929	44.53%	20	0.46%
1980	2,802	63.78%	1,543	35.12%	48	1.09%
1984	3,445	69.64%	1,484	30.00%	18	0.36%
1988	3,108	66.18%	1,568	33.39%	20	0.43%
1992	2,493	50.84%	1,713	34.93%	698	14.23%
1996	2,365	54.12%	1,415	32.38%	590	13.50%
2000	3,217	70.42%	1,293	28.31%	58	1.27%
2004	3,778	68.89%	1,667	30.40%	39	0.71%
2008	3,213	67.06%	1,510	31.52%	68	1.42%
2012	3,326	69.74%	1,342	28.14%	101	2.12%
2016	4,363	82.35%	785	14.82%	150	2.83%
2020	4,986	84.75%	823	13.99%	74	1.26%
2024	4,997	87.34%	666	11.64%	58	1.01%

Lewis County is one of the most Republican counties in Kentucky. The last Democrat to win the county in a presidential election was Samuel J. Tilden in 1876. A century later, Jimmy Carter was the last Democratic nominee to break forty percent. In a state that allowed slavery but did not secede from the Union, the Lewis County Courthouse has the only non-cemetery Union monument south of the Mason-Dixon Line that was erected by public subscription. The county is home to U.S. Rep. Thomas Massie, a Republican who was elected county judge-executive in 2010 and to Congress in 2012.

=== Elected officials ===
Elected officials as of May 30, 2025
U.S. House	Thomas Massie (R)	KY 4
Ky. Senate	Robin L. Webb (R)	18
Ky. House	Patrick Flannery (R)	96

== Communities ==
=== Cities ===
- Concord
- Vanceburg (County Seat)

=== Census-designated place ===
- Garrison

=== Other unincorporated places ===
- Alburn
- Awe
- Black Oak
- Beechy Creek
- Buena Vista
- Burtonville
- Cabin Creek
- Camp Dix
- Carrs
- Charters
- Clarksburg (County Seat 1809–1863)
- Cottageville
- Covedale
- Crum
- Emerson
- Emerson Orcutts Grocery
- Epworth
- Esculapia Springs
- Fearis
- Firebrick
- Fruit
- Glenn
- Glenn Springs (Earlier known as McCormick's Spring)
- Gun Powder Gap
- Haldeman
- Harris
- Head of Grass (Not to be confused with Head of Grassy)
- Head of Grassy
- Heselton
- Irwin
- Jacktown
- Kinniconick
- Kirkville
- Laurel
- Libbie
- Martin
- McDowell Creek
- McKenzie
- Montgomery Creek
- Mouth of Laurel
- Nashtown
- Noah
- Oak Ridge
- Orcutts Grocy (Not to be confused with Emerson Orcutts Grocery)
- Pence
- Petersville
- Poplar Flat (County Seat 1806–1809)
- Quicks Run
- Randville
- Records
- Rexton
- Ribolt
- Rugless
- Saint Paul
- Salt Lick
- Sand Hill
- Stricklett
- Sullivan
- Tannery
- Teutonia
- Thor
- Tollesboro
- Trinity (Trinity Station)
- Upper Bruce
- Valley
- Wadsworth

== Notable people ==
- Charles A. Baird (1870–1944) – University of Michigan's first athletic director from 1898 to 1909. Hired legendary coach Fielding H. Yost. Oversaw construction of Ferry Field. Older brother of James Baird.
- James Baird (1873–1953) – Quarterback at the University of Michigan 1892–1895. After graduation served as an Assistant Coach for the football program from 1897 to 1898. Later as a Civil Engineer, his construction company executed the building of prominent buildings such as the Lincoln Memorial and Tomb of the Unknown Soldier.
- Ralph Davis (1938–2021) – Basketball player for University of Cincinnati, starting on two NCAA Final Four teams for the Bearcats. Went on to play professional basketball in the American Basketball Association (ABA) for the Cincinnati Royals, a Pre-NBA merger franchise which is now the Sacramento Kings.
- Faith Esham (b. 1948) – Opera performer and recitalist. Voice Professor at Westminster Choir College of Rider University since 2000.
- Thomas Marshall (1793–1853) – United States Army general of the Mexican–American War.
- The founder of "Pillar of Fire Church" and KKK advocate Alma Bridwell White was born there.
- Thomas Massie (b. 1971) – U.S. representative, Kentucky's 4th Congressional District
- Thomas H. Paynter (1851–1921) – United States Senator 1907–1913
- George M. Thomas (1828–1914) – Member of the U.S. House of Representatives from Kentucky's 9th district: In office March 4, 1887 – March 3, 1889. Member of the Kentucky House of Representatives: In office 1859–1863, 1872–1873. Commonwealth's Attorney for the tenth judicial district 1862–1868. Was elected Lewis county judge in 1868. Republican candidate for Lieutenant Governor of Kentucky in 1871. Circuit Judge of the fourteenth judicial district from 1874 to 1880 and United States District Attorney from 1881 to 1885. Elected as a Republican to the Fiftieth Congress (March 4, 1887 – March 3, 1889). Was appointed Solicitor of Internal Revenue by President William McKinley on May 20, 1897, and served until May 31, 1901.

== See also ==
- National Register of Historic Places listings in Lewis County, Kentucky
