= Maysville micropolitan area, Kentucky =

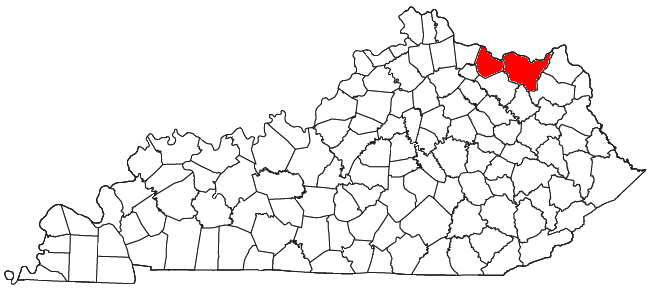
Location of the Maysville Micropolitan Statistical Area in Kentucky

The Maysville Micropolitan Statistical Area (μSA), was an area defined by the United States Census Bureau until 2023. It was coterminous with Mason County, Kentucky, whose county seat and largest city is Maysville. As of the 2010 census, the population of Mason County and the current μSA was 17,490, and 2014 Census Bureau estimates placed the population at 17,166.

Prior to a 2013 change in Census Bureau definitions, the Maysville μSA also included Lewis County, Kentucky. At that time, the μSA was redefined to consist solely of Mason County, and was also added as part of the Cincinnati-Wilmington-Maysville Combined Statistical Area.

As of the 2000 census, the μSA, which then consisted of Mason and Lewis Counties, had a population of 30,892 (though a July 1, 2009 estimate placed the population at 31,130).

In 2023, the Office of Management and Budget revised the definition of the Census Bureau's statistical areas, and as a result, Maysville and Mason County are no longer listed as an μSA or as part of a metropolitan area. Additionally, Maysville was removed from the newly renamed Cincinnati–Wilmington, OH–KY–IN Combined Statistical Area.

== County ==
- Mason

== Communities ==
=== Incorporated places ===
- Dover
- Germantown (partial)
- Maysville (principal city)
- Sardis (partial)

=== Unincorporated places ===
- Fernleaf
- Helena
- Minerva
- Orangeburg
- Shannon
- Somo
- Weedonia

== Demographics ==
As of the census of 2000, there were 30,892 people, 12,269 households, and 8,747 families residing within the μSA. The racial makeup of the μSA was 94.55% White, 3.99% African American, 0.18% Native American, 0.21% Asian, 0.01% Pacific Islander, 0.35% from other races, and 0.71% from two or more races. Hispanic or Latino of any race were 0.72% of the population.

The median income for a household in the μSA was $26,202, and the median income for a family was $31,683. Males had a median income of $26,145 versus $19,990 for females. The per capita income for the μSA was $14,310.

== See also ==
- Kentucky census statistical areas
