= List of Woodward High School (Cincinnati, Ohio) people =

This list contains notable people associated with Woodward High School in Cincinnati, Ohio, including alumni and current and former faculty.

== Alumni ==
=== Art and entertainment ===
- Karen Ackerman (1969) – author of children's literature
- Alice Williams Brotherton (1848–1930) – writer
- Marty Callner (1964) – music video director
- Gustave W. Drach – architect; designed the 1910 iteration of the school
- Leo Mielziner (1887) – artist and scenic designer, father of Jo Mielziner
- Harry Shokler (1914) – artist
- Richard Stoltzman (1960) – classical clarinetist

=== Athletics ===
- Daryl Boston (1981) – former Major League Baseball player
- Ezzard Charles (1942) – the "Cincinnati Cobra", professional boxer and former World Heavyweight Champion
- Leon Durham (1976) – former Major League Baseball player (1980–1989)
- Ray Edwards (2003) – defensive lineman for the Minnesota Vikings
- John Jackson (1983) – offensive tackle
- Ed Jucker (1936) – former head basketball coach at the University of Cincinnati and later coach for two seasons of the Cincinnati Royals of the NBA
- C. J. McDiarmid (c. 1886) – executive with the St. Louis Browns and Cincinnati Reds
- Antwan Peek (1998) – linebacker for the Cleveland Browns
- Abdul Salaam (1971) – former defensive tackle with the New York Jets' as part of the "New York Sack Exchange"; known as "Larry Faulk" while attending Woodward, he changed his name to Abdul Salaam, which means "soldier of peace," in 1977
- Ed Shuttlesworth (1970) (born 1952) – leading rusher for the Michigan Wolverines football teams of 1972 and 1973; third leading rusher in the Canadian Football League in 1974
- Clem Turner (1964) – NFL running back for Cincinnati Bengals and Denver Broncos; pro wrestler

=== Government and politics ===
- David H. Bailey – United States consul in Hong Kong (1870–1878) and consul general in Shanghai (1879–1880)
- Ted Berry (1924) – first African-American caledictorian at Woodward (1924); president of the Cincinnati branch of the NAACP (1932–1946); 1947–1961 served on the NAACP Ohio Committee for Civil Rights Legislation; first black assistant prosecuting attorney for Hamilton County; first African American mayor of Cincinnati (1972)
- Mark L. Mallory (1980) – mayor of Cincinnati
- Lafayette F. Mosher (1843) – associate justice of the Oregon Supreme Court, Oregon state senator
- O'dell Owens – reproductive endocrinologist, Hamilton County coroner, president of Cincinnati State Technical and Community College, nonprofit executive
- William Howard Taft (1874) – 27th president of the United States and 10th chief justice of the United States Supreme Court, the only person to hold both offices

=== Military ===
- Henry V. Boynton (1854) – Union Army officer during the Civil War, Medal of Honor recipient

=== Education ===
- Dr. Ronald Crutcher (1965) – president emeritus of Wheaton College; president of University of Richmond; accomplished cellist (member of the Klemperer Trio)
- Nelson Glueck (1916) – rabbi, academic and archaeologist; president of Hebrew Union College from 1947 until his death; his pioneering work in biblical archaeology resulted in the discovery of 1,500 ancient sites
- William Strunk Jr. – Cornell University English professor and author of The Elements of Style
- Florence K. Williamson-Norman – founder and president of the Washington Business Institute in Washington, D.C.; founder of Lambda Kappa Mu

=== Science ===
- Charles Henry Turner (ca 1887) – entomologist and first African American to receive a graduate degree at the University of Cincinnati and Ph.D. from the University of Chicago
- Hannah L. Wessling (1894) – chemist and food scientist, billed as "Uncle Sam's Bread Baker" during World War I

== Faculty ==
- William Holmes McGuffey (mid-1840s) – author of the McGuffey Readers, one of America's first textbooks
