= Florence K. Williamson-Norman =

African American educator and clubwoman

- Born: Florence Morton; March 30, 1893; Mason County, Kentucky, U.S.
- Died: February 8, 1944 (aged 50); Queens, New York, U.S.
- Occupation: Educator
- Employer(s): Fessenden Academy; Jennifer Business College; Washington Business Institute; Columbia University
- Organization(s): Iota Phi Lambda National Council of Negro Women New York City Federation of Women's Clubs
- Known for: Founder of Lambda Kappa Mu
- Spouse: Fred Norman

Florence K. Williamson-Norman (March 30, 1893 – February 8, 1944), born Florence Morton, was an African American educator, civic leader, and clubwoman. In 1937, she founded Lambda Kappa Mu, a business and professional sorority for African American women. She also established many chapters of the Iota Phi Lambda business sorority. She founded and was president of the Washington Business Institute. She was a charter member and executive secretary of the National Council of Negro Women. Williamson-Norman was also a board member of Bethune-Cookman College.

== Early life and eduction ==
Florence Morton was born on March 30, 1893, in Mason County, Kentucky. Her parents were Sallie and Charles Morton. Her father died when she was a small child, and her mother supported the family of three children by working as a laundress. Morton received her primary and secondary education at public schools in Covington, Kentucky and Cincinnati. Ohio. She graduated from Woodward High School in Cincinnati, and attended a normal school.

She studied business administration at Wayman College. She attended the Jennifer Business College and the Strayer Business College in Washington, D.C., majoring in business. She attended Howard University and the University of Hawaii. She also took graduate classes at Columbia University.

== Career ==
Williamson-Norman was a teacher, dean of students, and business manager of the Fessenden Academy in Florida for several years. She also worked as the secretary of Carter G. Woodson, who was the president of the Association for the Study of Negro Life and History.

Williamson-Norman was a staff member of the Freedman's Hospital in Washington, D.C. She worked as the private secretary Charles E. Lane, lawyer and manager of Lincoln Theatre. She also taught commercial classes at the Jennifer Business College for three years.

In 1933, she worked for the C. M. A. Corporation in New York City. Later, Williamson-Norman was a liasson officer for the student relations department of Columbia University. She then formed and was president of the Washington Business Institute, a school in Harlem. She served on the board of directors of the Bethune-Cookman College.

== Clubswoman ==
=== Civil rights and civic clubs ===
Williamson-Norman worked with Mary McLeod Bethune to form the National Council of Negro Women in 1936, becoming a charter member and serving on its first board as the recording secretary. Later, Bethune selected Williamson-Norman to the position of executive secretary. Williamson-Norman was the vice president of the New York City Federation of Women's Clubs and an affiliate of the International Council of Women. She was also involved with the National Urban League in New York City.

Williamson-Norman established and was the first president of the Flushing Suburban Civic Association to help African Americans in her neighborhood in Queens, New York. She served on the advisory board of Queens County Tuberculosis Association. She also founded and was the sponsor of the Pioneer Club of the Junior Bethune Clubs in New York City.

=== Iota Phi Lambda ===
Williamson-Norman was the founding president of the Gamma chapter of Iota Phi Lambda business sorority, at Washington Business College in Washington, D.C. In August 1933, she was elected to Iota Phi Lambda's first national board as the Eastern Regional Directoress. After moving ot New York City, she established the sorority's Theta chapter there in August 1934. As the Eastern Regional Directoress, she helped establish chapters in Hopkinsville, Kentucky; Louisville, Kentucky; and Pittsburgh, Pennsylvania in 1935. She organized a chapter in Russellville, Kentucky in December 1936.

=== Lambda Kappa Mu ===
Williamson-Norman was the founder of Lambda Kappa Mu, a business and professional sorority for African American women, on January 19, 1937. She served on the sorority's executive board as its grand syntaktas (national organizer). In the early days, the sorority's national executive board met at her home in New York City.

One of the projects she encouraged the sorority to adopt was sponsoring the children of Southern sharecroppers, ensuring that they had better access to education. Williamson-Norman was the sorority's representative to the National Pan-Hellenic Council in 1940. She retired from the executive board as grand syntaktas emeritus.

Lambda Kappa Mu established the Florence K. Norman Scholarship Award in her honor, an academic scholarship to help women attend college.

== Personal life ==
Morton married William Keruts of Maysville, Kentucky on March 30, 1917, in Honolulu, Oahu, Hawaii. At the time, he had been in Hawaii for four years; she arrived there the day before. Later, she married Mr. Williamson.

She married Fred Norman, a jazz composer and staff arranger for the Benny Goodman Band and became Broadway's top arranger. He was from Florida and was a graduate of Bethune-Cookman College. They lived at 160-16 73rd Avenue, in the Flushing Heights neighborhood of New York City. He supported her fundraising efforts for Lambda Kappa Mu and Bethune-Cookman College; they served as co-chairs of the sorority's effort to secure donations of musical instruments for the college. The couple did not have children, but did sponsor and house Clara Bell Warner, the daughter of a sharecropper from Minerva, Kentucky, so that she could attend high school and college in New York City.

Williamson-Norman traveled extensively, visiting Canada, China, Cuba, Japan, Mexico, the Philippines, and every state in the United States. She also enjoyed playing tennis, cooking, and motoring. She was a member of St. Jude's Episcopal Church in Manhattan, New York.

Williamson-Norman became ill in 1941 and never fully recovered. In 1943, she spent six weeks at Medical Center Hospital in New York City. She died at the age of 45 on February 8, 1944, in the Jamaica Long Island Hospital in Queens, New York. She was buried in the Flushing Cemetery in Queens.
