= Iota Phi Lambda =

African American business sorority

- ΙΦΛ
- Founded: June 1, 1929; 97 years ago Chicago, Illinois
- Type: Professional
- Affiliation: Coalition of Black Business Sororities
- Status: Active
- Emphasis: African American - Business
- Scope: National (US)
- Motto: "Upward and Onward in Efficient Service"
- Colors: Emerald Green and White
- Flower: White rose and green fern
- Mascot: Turtle
- Publication: Iota Journal
- Chapters: 64
- Members: 1,300+ active 5,000+ lifetime
- Headquarters: 80 M Street SE, Suite 2-118; Washington, D.C. 20003; United States
- Website: www.iota1929.org

Iota Phi Lambda Sorority Inc. (ΙΦΛ) is an African American business sorority. Founded in 1929, it was the first Greek-lettered business sorority established by African American women. It has established more than 100 chapters in the United States. The sorority is a member of the Coalition of Black Business Sororities.

== History ==
Iota Phi Lambda was founded on June 1, 1929, in Chicago, Illinois by Lola Mercedes Parker. It was the first African American business and professional sorority. Its purpose was to help elevate the status of business women, encourage women to choose business as a career, inspire women to seek career training, and to help African American women overcome the impact of the Great Depression. Its six founding members were Ethel T. Edwards, Mildred G. Hardin, Ophelia Harrison, Lola M. Parker, Harriet M. Robinson, Burdette Trigg, and Marjorie Tyndall, Lola M. Parker. Six of the founders were graduates of the Chicago Business College and one from Kansas State College.

The sorority held its first annual convention in 1929. By 2023, it expanded to charter more than 100 chapters with 5,000 initiates.

Iota Phi Lambda is a member of the Coalition of Black Business Sororities, which also includes Gamma Phi Delta, Eta Phi Beta, and Lambda Kappa Mu. Iota Phi Lambda is not a National Pan Hellenic Council (NPHC) sorority; dual membership within Iota Phi Lambda Sorority and NPHC sororities is allowed.

As of January 2024, the sorority has 64 active chapters and more than 1,300 active members. Its national headquarters is located in Washington, D.C.

== Symbols ==
The motto of Iota Phi Lambda is "Upward and Onward in Efficient Service." Its colors are emerald green and white. Its flower is the white rose with green fern. Its mascot is the turtle. Its publication is the Iota Journal.

== Activities ==
The national sorority holds activities and programs to support public schools during American Education Weeks, Black History Month, Business Month, and Correspondence Week. It also presents the Lola M. Parker Award for the outstanding woman of the year and the Mahala S. Evans Award for the outstanding member of the year. Iota Phi Lambda is not a National Pan Hellenic Council (NPHC) sorority; dual membership within Iota Phi Lambda Sorority and NPHC sororities is allowed.

The sorority's national philanthropies are Toys U Can't Return, a teen pregnancy prevention program, and Iota Mothers Assistance which provides outreach and help for disadvantaged mothers. Chapters provide tutoring at local schools and hold programs to help youth explore careers. The sorority also awards annual scholarships on the chapter, regional, and national levels to help women seek careers in business, engineering, or science.

== Chapters ==
Iota Phi Lambda has established more than 100 chapters in 85 cities in the United States.

== Notable members ==
- Mary Dee, radio personality
- Ethel Finnie, blues singer
- Lola Mercedes Parker, clubwoman and president of Iota Phi Lambda
- Florence K. Williamson-Norman, founder of the Washington Business Institute and Lambda Kappa Mu; charter member and executive secretary of the National Council of Negro Women

=== Honorary ===
- Peggielene Bartels, Ghanaian chief
- Mary McLeod Bethune, educator and civil rights leader
- Pearl S. Buck, writer
- Donna Christensen, United States House of Representatives
- Marian Wright Edelman, activist for children's rights
- Ada Crogman Franklin, activist for children's rights and journalist
- Irene McCoy Gaines, social worker and civil rights activist
- Hazel Garland, journalist
- Lydia P. Jackson, Louisiana State Senate
- Carrie Meek, United States House of Representatives
- Rachel B. Noel, educator and politician
- Mai Padmore, Liberian politician
- Nettie George Speedy, journalist and golfer
- Betty Smith Williams, nurse

== See also ==
- Professional fraternities and sororities
- List of African-American fraternities
