= Lola Mercedes Parker =

American clubwoman

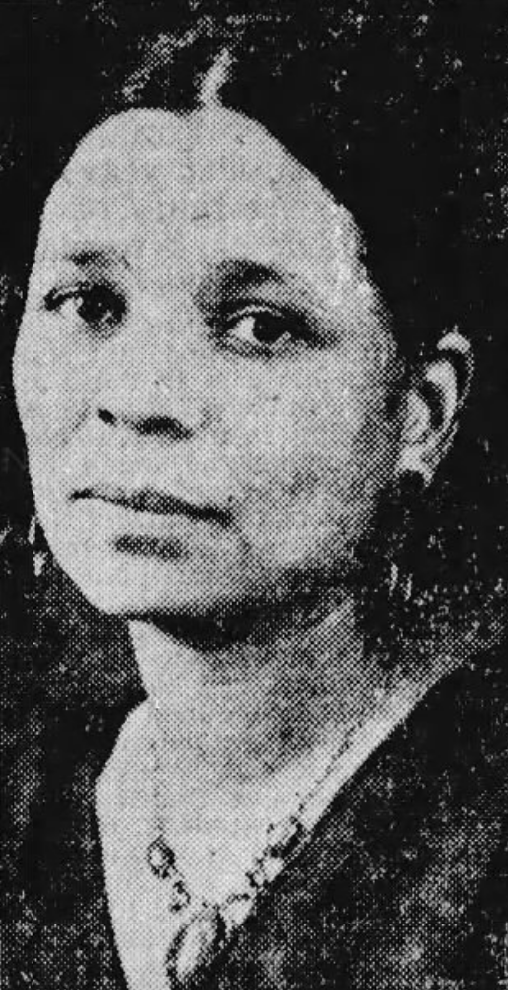
- Parker, from a 1930 newspaper
- Born: Lola Mercedes Smith; February 25, 1900; Little Rock, Arkansas, U.S.
- Died: March 19, 1987 (aged 87); Chicago, Illinois, U.S.
- Known for: Founder, president of Iota Phi Lambda

Lola Mercedes Smith Parker (February 25, 1900 – March 19, 1987) was an American clubwoman. She was founder of Iota Phi Lambda, a professional sorority for Black businesswomen; she was also president of the sorority from 1929 to 1946.

== Early life and education ==
Parker was born in Little Rock, Arkansas, the daughter of John Henry Smith and Jessie Elsie Strauss Smith. She graduated from high school in Kansas City, Missouri, and attended the Chicago Business College.

== Career ==
Parker was secretary to L. K. Williams, the president of the National Baptist Convention. She founded Iota Phi Lambda in 1929. "It was her desire to prove that those women who chose business as a career had selected an honorable vocation that should merit similar presitge as is enjoed by those in the arts and professions," explained The Chicago Defender. She was president of the national organization until 1946, and then president emeritus. In 1954 she was honored at a luncheon in Chicago, marking the sorority's 25th anniversary.

Parker was chair of the membership committee of the Chicago Council of Negro Organizations. In 1940 she was main speaker at a meeting of the Illinois Housewives Association. She was national vice-president in the Women's Army for National Defense (WANDs) during World War II. She was first treasurer of the National Council of Negro Women (NCNW).

== Personal life ==
Smith married postal clerk William Stanley Parker in 1922. Her husband died in 1948, and she died in 1987, at the age of 87, in Chicago. The Lola Mercedes Parker Foundation funds scholarships for students pursuing degrees in business, and mentorships for entrepreneurs.
