= Shannon, Kentucky =

Unincorporated community in Kentucky, United States

Coordinates: 38°32′16″N 83°54′10″W

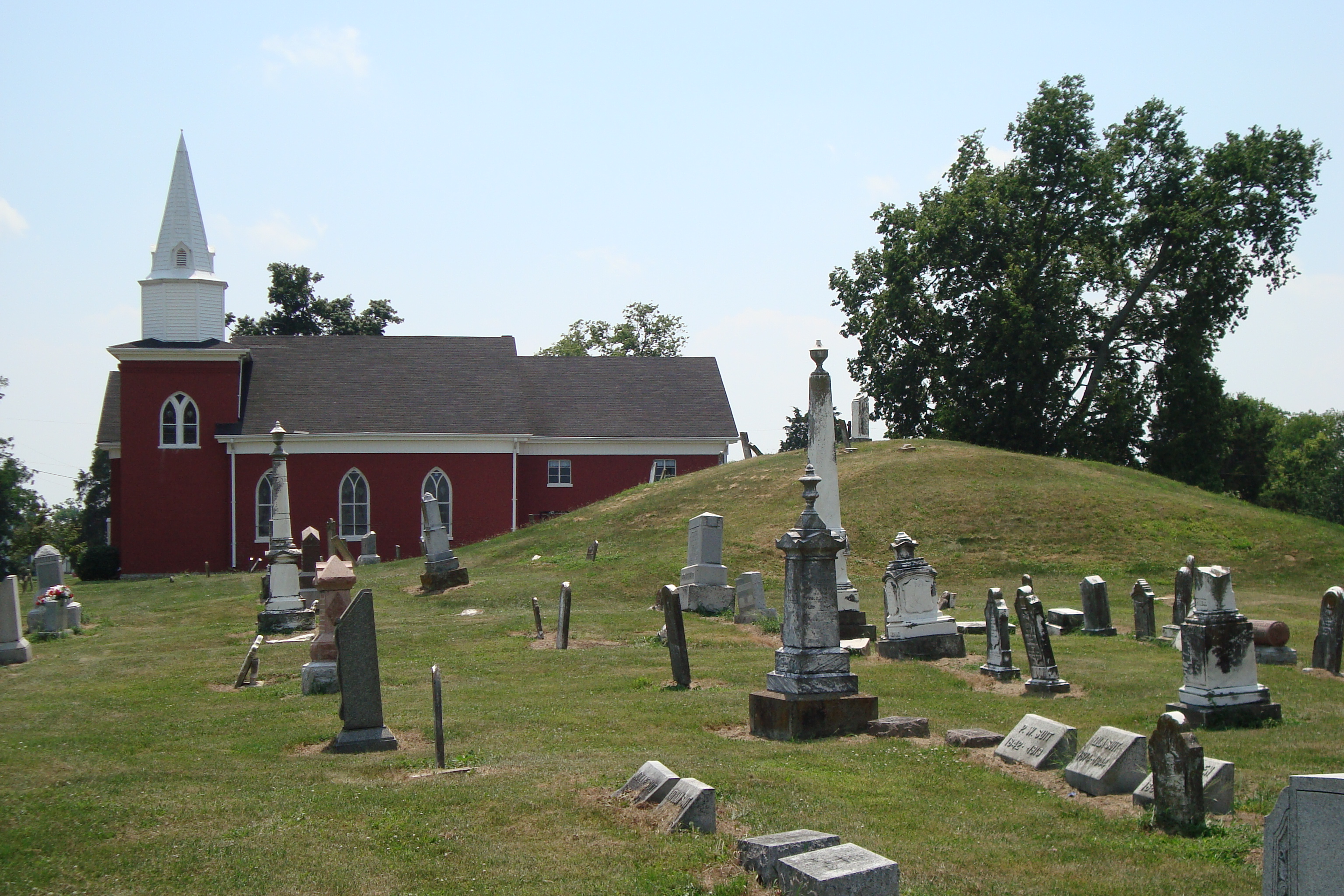
The Shannon Methodist Church, Shannon Mound, and historical cemetery.

Shannon is an unincorporated community in Mason County, Kentucky, United States. The village lies southwest of Maysville on U.S. Route 62, near the town of Sardis.

The highest point in the community is dominated by the Shannon Methodist Church and a mound built by the prehistoric inhabitants of the region. The ovoid earthwork is 8 to 10 feet high and 100 feet in diameter. Historical graves in the mound have prevented archaeological investigation and more precise identification of the mound's builders.

Shannon is part of the Maysville Micropolitan Statistical Area.

== See also ==
- Mound
- Mound builder (people)
