= List of Iota Phi Lambda chapters =

Iota Phi Lambda is a business sorority established by African American businesswomen. The sorority was founded in Chicago, Illinois in 1929.

== Graduate chapters ==
Following is an incomplete list of Iota Phi Lambda's graduate chapters, with active chapters indicated in bold and inactive chapters in italics.

Chapter	Charter date and range	Location	Region	Status	Ref.
**Alpha**	June 1, 1929	Chicago, Illinois	Central	Active	
Beta (First)	February 1931–before 1948	Buffalo, New York	Eastern	Inactive, Reassigned	
**Gamma**	April 28, 1931	Washington, D.C.	Eastern	Active	
**Delta**	June 1930	Atlanta, Georgia	Southern	Active	
**Epsilon**	April 1932	Ohio	Central	Active	(Note: Chapter formed from the Young Women's Business Club in Cleveland, Ohio.)
Zeta	May 1934	Detroit, Michigan	Central	Inactive	
Eta ?		Houston, Texas	Southwestern	Inactive	
Theta	August 17, 1934	Brooklyn, New York	Eastern	Inactive	
Iota		Philadelphia, Pennsylvania	Eastern	Inactive	
Kappa (First)	June 1935 – before 1940	New York City, New York	Eastern	Inactive, Reassigned	
**Lambda**	December 1934	Tuskegee, Alabama	Southern	Active	
**Mu (Second)**	1946	Montgomery, Alabama	Southern	Active	
**Nu (Second)**	1938	Savannah, Georgia	Southern	Active	
Xi	March 1935	Hopkinsville, Kentucky	Central	Inactive	
**Omicron**	April 1935	New York City, New York	Eastern	Active	
Pi	April 1935	Pittsburgh, Pennsylvania	Eastern	Inactive	
**Rho**	May 1935	Durham, North Carolina	Southern	Active	
Sigma	April 1935	Louisville, Kentucky	Central	Inactive	
Upsilon		Kansas City, Missouri	Central	Inactive	
Chi		Jacksonville, Florida	Southern	Inactive	
**Psi**	July 31, 1936	Dallas, Texas	Southwestern	Active	
**Alpha Beta**	July 22, 1936	Chicago, Illinois	Central	Active	
Alpha Gamma	October 15, 1936	Washington, D.C.	Eastern	Inactive	
	December 12, 1936	Russellville, Kentucky	Central	Inactive	
Alpha Delta	before February 1937	Des Moines, Iowa	Central	Inactive	
Alpha Epsilon	January 28, 1937	Henderson, Kentucky	Central	Inactive	
**Alpha Zeta**	April 10, 1937	St. Louis, Missouri	Central	Active	
Alpha Eta	April 29, 1937	Birmingham, Alabama	Southern	Inactive	
**Alpha Kappa**	1975	Houston, Texas	Southwestern	Active	
**Alpha Lambda**	1971	Harvey, Illinois	Central	Active	
**Alpha Xi**	1939	Knoxville, Tennessee	Southern	Active	
**Kappa (Second)**	1940	Baltimore, Maryland	Eastern	Active	
**Alpha Omicron**		Denver, Colorado	Far Western	Active	
**Alpha Sigma**	1944	Tampa, Florida	Southern	Active	
**Alpha Tau**		Chicago, Illinois	Central	Active	
**Alpha Chi**	February 22, 1946	Norfolk, Virginia	Eastern	Active	
**Beta Delta**		Houston, Texas	Southwestern	Active	
**Beta Zeta**	1947	Columbus, Georgia	Southern	Active	
**Beta (Second)**	1948	Hartford, Connecticut	Eastern	Active	
**Beta Xi**	1948	Mobile, Alabama	Southern	Active	
**Beta Nu**		Denver, Colorado	Far Western	Active	
**Beta Omicron**	July 31, 1948	Philadelphia, Pennsylvania	Eastern	Active	
**Beta Pi**		Houston, Texas	Southwestern	Active	
**Beta Psi**		Shreveport, Louisiana	Southwestern	Active	
**Gamma Alpha**	February 27, 1954	Miami, Florida	Southern	Active	
**Gamma Delta**	November 27, 1954	Richmond, Virginia	Eastern	Active	
**Gamma Eta**		Frensno, California	Far Western	Active	
**Gamma Zeta**	1956	Newport News, Virginia	Eastern	Active	
**Gamma Mu**		Los Angeles, California	Far Western	Active	
**Gamma Nu**		San Francisco, California	Far Western	Active	
**Gamma Tau**	April 8, 1967	Minneapolis and Saint Paul, Minnesota	Central	Active	
**Gamma Phi**		San Antonio, Texas	Southwestern	Active	
**Epsilon Zeta**	1980	Saint Thomas, U.S. Virgin Islands	Eastern	Active	
**Epsilon Eta**	July 1981	Gloucester, Virginia	Eastern	Active	
**Epsilon Lambda**	1985	Southfield, Michigan	Central	Active	
**Epsilon Xi**	May 22, 1993	Texarkana, Texas	Southwestern	Active	
**Epsilon Omicron**		Arlington, Texas	Southwestern	Active	
**Epsilon Sigma**		Channelview, Texas	Southwestern	Active	
**Epsilon Tau**	May 4, 2013	DeSoto, Texas	Southwestern	Active	
**Epsilon Phi**		Humble, Texas	Southwestern	Active	
**Epsilon Chi**	September 10, 2016	Katy, Texas	Southwestern	Active	
**Epsilon Psi**	2017	Murfreesboro, Tennessee	Southern	Active	
**Epsilon Rho**	2007	Orlando, Florida	Southern	Active	
Zeta Alpha	June 24, 2017	Pompano Beach, Florida	Southern	Inactive	
**Zeta Beta**	July 2017	Eastvale, California	Far Western	Active	
**Zeta Gamma**	December 2, 2017	Willowick, Ohio	Central	Active	
**Zeta Delta**	June 30, 2018	Memphis, Tennessee	Southern	Active	
**Zeta Epsilon**	August 4, 2018	Pembroke Pines, Florida	Southern	Active	
**Zeta Eta**	2019	Allendale, South Carolina	Southern	Active	
**Zeta Theta**	June 1, 2019	Charlotte, North Carolina	Southern	Active	
**Zeta Kappa**	December 6, 2020	Phoenix, Arizona	Far Western	Active	
Zeta Lambda	2021	Little Rock, Arkansas	Southwestern	Inactive	
**Zeta Mu**	July 18, 2021	Upper Marlboro, Maryland	Eastern	Active	
**Zeta Nu**	July 10, 2021	St. Louis, Missouri	Central	Active	
**Zeta Xi**	April 20, 2022	Rowlett, Texas	Southwestern	Active	
**Zeta Omicron**	September 11, 2022	Huntsville, Alabama	Southern	Active	
**Zeta Pi**	August 30, 2022	Bolingbrook, Illinois	Central	Active	
**Zeta Rho**	October 9, 2022	Petersburg, Virginia	Eastern	Active	
**Zeta Sigma**	October 2022	Las Vegas, Nevada	Far Western	Active	
Zeta Tau	December 15, 2022	San Tan Valley, Arizona	Far Western	Inactive	
**Zeta Upsilon**	April 2023	South Carolina Lowcountry, South Carolina	Southern	Active	
**Zeta Phi**	August 13, 2023	Tomball, Texas	Southwestern	Active	
**Zeta Chi**	December 9, 2023	New Kent, Virginia	Eastern	Active	
**Zeta Psi**	January 13, 2024	Reisterstown, Maryland	Eastern	Active	
**Eta Alpha**	June 15, 2024	Fairview Heights, Illinois	Central	Active	
**Eta Beta**	November 3, 2024	Brazoria County, Texas	Southwestern	Active	
**Eta Gamma**	November 17, 2024	Lake St. Louis, Missouri	Central	Active	
**Eta Delta**	December 28, 2024	Tucson, Arizona	Far Western	Active	
**Eta Epsilon**	May 31, 2025	Maricopa, Arizona	Far Western	Active	
**Eta Zeta**	June 7, 2025	Chantilly, Virginia	Eastern	Active	
**Eta Eta**	August 30, 2025	Fort Worth, Texas	Southwestern	Active	
**Eta Theta**	November 22, 2025	Laurel, Maryland	Eastern	Active	

== Undergraduate chapters ==
Following is an incomplete list of Iota Phi Lambda's undergraduate chapters, with active chapters indicated in bold and inactive chapters in italics.

Chapter	Charter date and range	Institution	Location	Region	Status	Ref.
Mu (First)	February 16, 1935	Florida A&M University	Tallahassee, Florida	Southern	Inactive, Reassigned	(Note: This was the sorority's first undergraduate chapter.)
Nu (First)	March 2, 1935	Morris Brown College	Atlanta, Georgia	Southern	Inactive, Reassigned	
Delta Gamma	May 14, 1937	Langston University	Langston, Oklahoma	Central	Inactive	
**Delta Alpha**	1974	Savannah State College	Savannah, Georgia	Southern	Active	
Delta Beta	November 9, 2008	University of South Florida	Tampa, Florida	Southern	Inactive	
**Delta Rho**	April 3, 2021	Alabama State University	Montgomery, Alabama	Southern	Active	
**Delta Phi**	April 5, 2018	Howard University	Washington, D.C.	Eastern	Active	
**Delta Chi**	November 5, 2022	Fisk University	Nashville, Tennessee	Southern	Active	
**Delta Psi**	December 6, 2025	University of Illinois Urbana-Champaign	Champaign, Illinois	Central	Active	
