= Fred Norman =

Fred Norman may refer to:

- Fred Norman (baseball) (born 1942), American former professional baseball player
- Fred Norman (musician) (1910–1993), American jazz composer, music arranger, trombonist, and singer
- Fred B. Norman (1882–1947), American politician
