= Catherine Basie =

American dancer, philanthropist, and advocate (1914-1983)

- Born: Catherine Morgan; April 11, 1914; Columbus, Ohio, U.S.
- Died: April 11, 1983 (aged 69); Freeport, Grand Bahama, Bahamas
- Occupations: Dancer, philanthropist, activist
- Spouse: Count Basie

Catherine Basie (née Morgan) (1914–1983) was a dancer who performed with the Whitman Sisters and starred as a featured dancer in musical short films called soundies. She married the jazz composer and bandleader Count Basie and was an advocate for civil rights and for children with disabilities.

== Early life and career ==
Catherine Basie (née Morgan) was born on April 11, 1914, in Cleveland, Ohio.

She was a champion backstroke swimmer in high school and an Olympic hopeful. Unable to adequately train for the 1936 Olympics due to a lack of financial support, Catherine ended her athletic career and began pursuing dancing. At 16 years old she joined the Black vaudeville quartet, the Whitman Sisters and became part of a trio of dancers which included Alice Whitman and Jeni LeGon known as the “Snake Hips Queens.” She was also an accomplished singer, one of the original performers at the Copacabana nightclub in New York, and a fan dancer at Club Harlem. Catherine was a featured dancer in short films, “soundies,” which were produced during the early 1940s. She is billed under her stage name, Princess Aloha. Princess Aloha is the featured act with Andy Iona and His Orchestra in the 1941 soundie “Hilo Hattie.” The film was produced by Sam Coslow and directed by Josef Berne. She also starred as Princess Aloha with Charles Dorn in “My Little Grass Shack” in 1942.

External videos
- “Princess Aloha - Hilo Hattie, January 27, 2024, Vintage Video Clips

== Personal life ==
The marriage between Catherine and the renowned jazz composer and bandleader, Count Basie, is shrouded in some ambiguity regarding its exact timeline. According to Count Basie's autobiography, the couple eloped in late summer of 1942, while contemporaneous newspapers asserted their elopement occurred in January 1943. In early 1943, Count Basie claimed that the couple had been recently engaged, but not yet married. The marriage license for the couple held at the Washington State archives in Kings County is dated July 13, 1950.

The couple had one daughter, Diane Basie, who was born in Cleveland, Ohio 1944 with cerebral palsy. The couple was encouraged to place their daughter in an institution, but they refused. They raised Diane at their home with the assistance of a personal nurse named Deedee. Due to her daughter's health struggles, Catherine became an advocate for children with developmental disabilities and was recognized for her efforts by various organizations such as United Cerebral Palsy, the Salvation Army, and Lighthouse for the Blind.

Catherine and her husband lived in the St. Albans neighborhood in Queens, NY and in the 1970s moved to Freeport, Bahamas. She died of a heart attack on April 11, 1983 (her 69th birthday) at her home in Freeport.

== Activism ==
Catherine was advocate for civil rights. She was an honorary member of Lambda Kappa Mu, a national sorority of African American business and professional women established in 1937. She helped raise money for civil rights organizations such as the NAACP, Southern Christian Leadership Conference, National Conference of Christians and Jews, and co-chaired a committees to honor civil rights activists such as Dr. Martin Luther King Jr., Dr. Ralph Abernathy, Fred Shuttlesworth, and Wyatt Tee Walker.

In 1953, Catherine was traveling in Ohio with her young child and maid and was denied entrance to a local restaurant. The restaurant claimed it could not serve her because it was closed, but Catherine observed other patrons entering the establishment. Catherine contacted Barbee William Durham, executive secretary of the Columbus NAACP. Durham, along with other NAACP officials, accompanied Catherine to the restaurant where they were allowed entry and given service.

In 1971, when the Basie family moved from New York City to the Bahamas, New York congressman Mario Biaggi entered a tribute to Catherine Basie into the Congressional Record highlighting her many years of work with children with disabilities.
