= George Arthur Padmore =

Liberian diplomat (1915–2005)

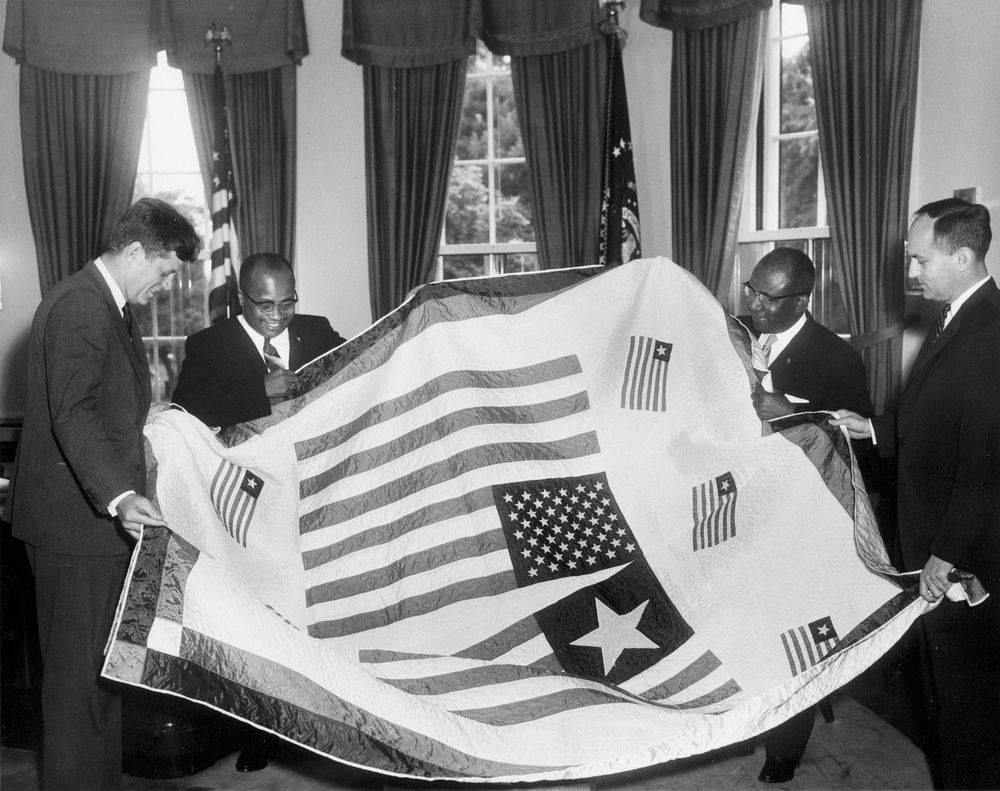
- President John F. Kennedy meets with Vice President of Liberia William R. Tolbert. (L-R) President Kennedy, Vice President Tolbert, Liberian Ambassador George Padmore, and Deputy Director of the Office of West African Affairs Wendell B. Coote hold a quilted coverlet adorned with the Liberian and American flags.
- Born: July 16, 1915
- Died: April 15, 2005 (aged 89); Silver Spring, Maryland, United States

George Arthur Padmore (July 16, 1915 – April 15, 2005) was a Liberian diplomat. From 1956 to 1961 he was Liberian Ambassador to the United States.

== Life ==
Padmore was born on July 16, 1915, the grandson of General George Stanley Padmore, and the son of James Stanley Padmore and Mary Louise Barclay-Padmore, who had emigrated to Liberia from Barbados. His older sister was Antoinette Tubman. After Padmore's parents died in a canoeing accident on the Saint Paul River, he became the adopted son of the politician Edwin Barclay and his wife Euphemia.

In April 1939 Padmore married Edith Mai Wiles, who would later serve as Liberia's first woman cabinet minister. The couple had five children.

Padmore died at Holy Cross Hospital in Silver Spring, Maryland on April 15, 2005.

== Works ==
- Memoirs of a Liberian Ambassador. Edwin Mellen Press, 1996.
