= Belle de Rivera =

American clubwoman

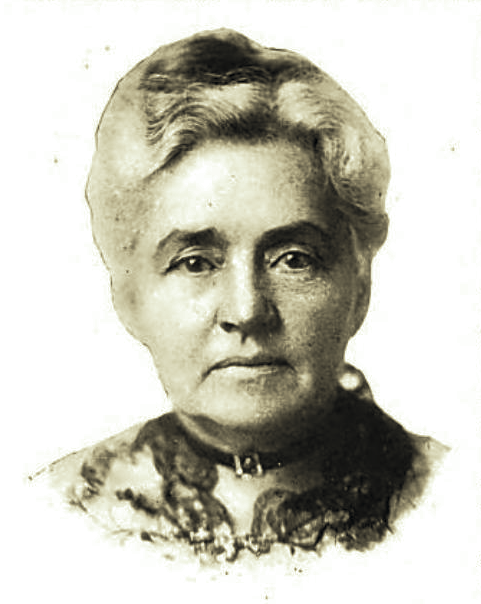
- Belle de Rivera (Scannell's, 1917)
- Born: Belle Camblos; March 15, 1848; Philadelphia, Pennsylvania, U.S.
- Died: March 30, 1943 (aged 95); Mountain Lakes, New Jersey, U.S.
- Education: Emma Willard School
- Occupation: Clubwoman
- Known for: President, New York City Federation of Women's Clubs; President, New York Equal Suffrage League
- Spouse: John de Rivera (m. 1877)

Belle de Rivera (née Camblos; March 15, 1848 – March 30, 1943) was an American suffragist, social activist, and a leader in the women's club movement. Between 1890 and 1915, she was founded or cofounded twenty-six women's organizations, including the New York City Federation of Women's Clubs, serving as its first president for four years and honorary president for life.

== Early life and education ==
Belle Camblos was born in Philadelphia, Pennsylvania on March 15, 1848. She had French and Scottish ancestry. Her parents were Henry S. and Isabel (née Patton) Camblos. Her father served for three years in the American Civil War. Upon his return from the army, the family moved from Philadelphia to New York City, where de Rivera lived until 1912.

She was educated at the Emma Willard Seminary in Troy, New York, graduating in 1865.

== Career and activism ==
In 1896, de Rivera was an inspector of mercantile establishments for the New York City Department of Health.

De Rivera was instrumental in organizing the New York City Federation of Women's Clubs, the first local federation in the city. She was the first president of the new local Federation and served for two terms of two years each. In recognition of her services, the Federation created the title of Founder for her and made her honorary president for life.

De Rivera was also interested in the women's suffrage movement. She served for seven years as president of the New York Equal Suffrage League and represented New York at the 1904 Convention of the National American Woman Suffrage Association. She was also an activist in movements for the improvement of working conditions for girls, including assisting in the establishment of a working girls' hotel on West 22nd Street. She served as president of its board of directors for seven years after its founding.

In 1912, de Rivera moved to Mountain Lakes, New Jersey, where she organized and was the first president of the Women's Club of Mountain Lakes.

== Personal life and legacy ==
On February 7, 1877, Camblos married John de Rivera in New York City. They had a daughter, Henriette, who married Henry Loney, of New York.

de Rivera died on March 30, 1943 in Mountain Lakes.

A tree in the New York City Federation of Women's Clubs groves in Central Park was planted in Rivera's honor.

== Selected works ==
- "How Women Can Halt the Great Black Plague", Pearson's Magazine, 1910
