= Mason County, Kentucky =

County in Kentucky, United States

- County
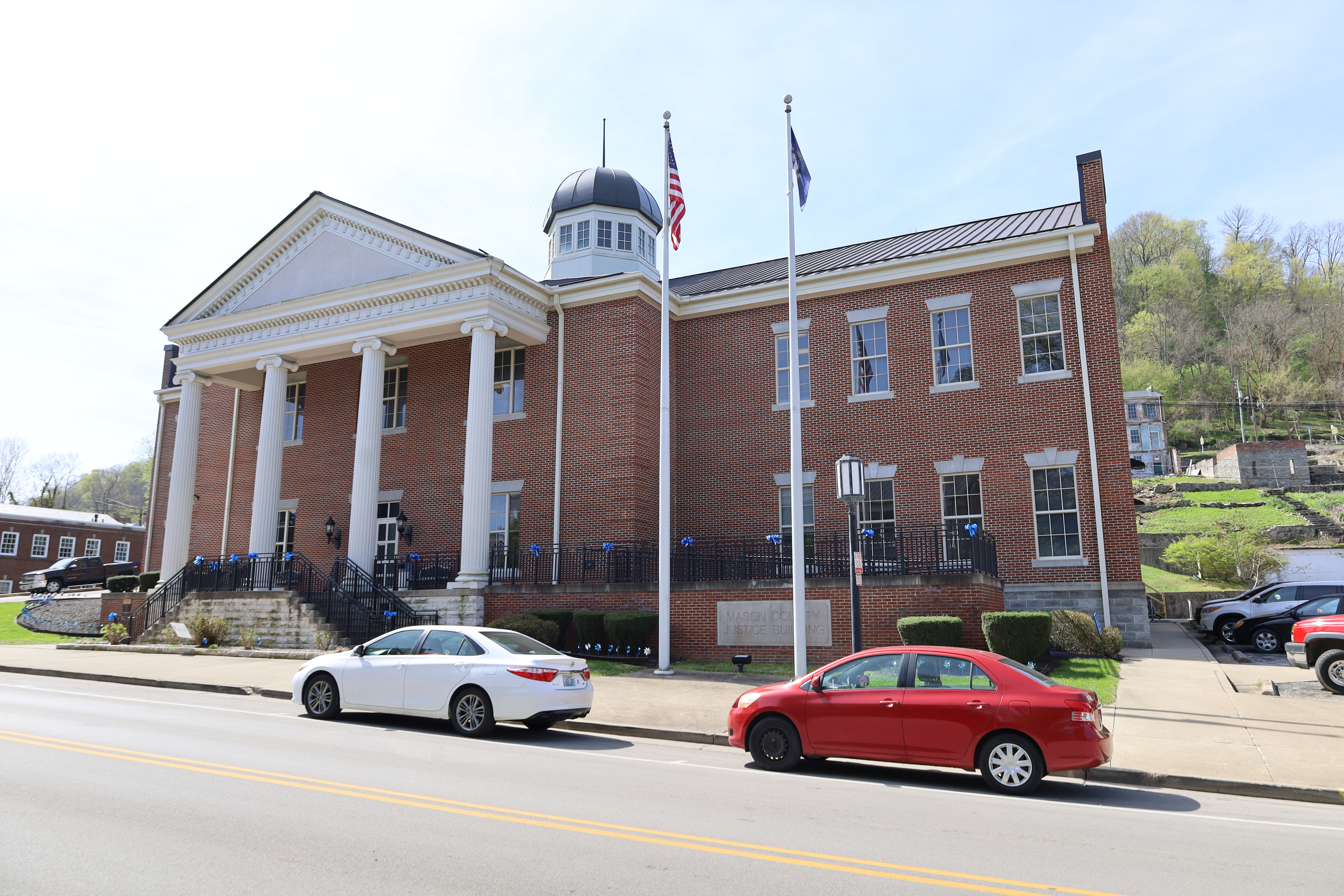
- The Mason County Justice Building in Maysville in 2023

- Location within the U.S. state of Kentucky
- Coordinates: 38°36′N 83°50′W
- Country: United States
- State: Kentucky
- Founded: 1788
- Named for: George Mason
- Seat: Maysville
- Largest city: Maysville

Government
  - Judge/Executive: Owen McNeill (D)

Area
  - Total: 246 sq mi (640 km^{2})
  - Land: 240 sq mi (620 km^{2})
  - Water: 6.3 sq mi (16 km^{2}) 2.6%

Population (2020)
  - Total: 17,120
  - Estimate (2025): 16,936 ▼
  - Density: 71/sq mi (28/km^{2})
- Time zone: UTC−5 (Eastern)
  - Summer (DST): UTC−4 (EDT)
- Congressional district: 4th
- Website: masoncountykentucky.us

Mason County is a county located in the U.S. state of Kentucky. As of the 2020 census, the population was 17,120. Its county seat is Maysville. The county was created from Bourbon County, Virginia in 1788 and named for George Mason, a Virginia delegate to the U.S. Constitutional Convention known as the "Father of the Bill of Rights". Mason County comprises the Maysville, KY Micropolitan Statistical Area, which is included in the Cincinnati-Wilmington-Maysville, OH-KY-IN Combined Statistical Area.

== Geography ==
According to the United States Census Bureau, the county has a total area of 246 square miles (640 km^{2}), of which 240 square miles (620 km^{2}) is land and 6.3 square miles (16 km^{2}) (2.6%) is water. The county's northern border with Ohio is formed by the Ohio River.

=== Adjacent counties ===
- Brown County, Ohio (north)
- Adams County, Ohio (northeast)
- Lewis County (east)
- Fleming County (south)
- Robertson County (southwest)
- Bracken County (west)

== Demographics ==
Historical population
Census	Pop.	Note	%±
1790	2,729		—
1800	12,182		346.4%
1810	12,459		2.3%
1820	13,588		9.1%
1830	16,199		19.2%
1840	15,719		−3.0%
1850	18,344		16.7%
1860	18,222		−0.7%
1870	18,126		−0.5%
1880	20,469		12.9%
1890	20,773		1.5%
1900	20,446		−1.6%
1910	18,611		−9.0%
1920	17,760		−4.6%
1930	18,862		6.2%
1940	19,066		1.1%
1950	18,486		−3.0%
1960	18,454		−0.2%
1970	17,273		−6.4%
1980	17,765		2.8%
1990	16,666		−6.2%
2000	16,800		0.8%
2010	17,490		4.1%
2020	17,120		−2.1%
2025 (est.)	16,936	▼	−1.1%
U.S. Decennial Census; 1790-1960 1900-1990; 1990-2000 2010-2020

=== 2020 census ===
As of the 2020 census, the county had a population of 17,120. The median age was 42.4 years. 22.6% of residents were under the age of 18 and 19.5% of residents were 65 years of age or older. For every 100 females there were 94.3 males, and for every 100 females age 18 and over there were 90.7 males age 18 and over.

The racial makeup of the county was 86.8% White, 6.0% Black or African American, 0.2% American Indian and Alaska Native, 0.6% Asian, 0.0% Native Hawaiian and Pacific Islander, 1.0% from some other race, and 5.3% from two or more races. Hispanic or Latino residents of any race comprised 2.1% of the population.

46.5% of residents lived in urban areas, while 53.5% lived in rural areas.

There were 7,136 households in the county, of which 29.3% had children under the age of 18 living with them and 29.5% had a female householder with no spouse or partner present. About 30.6% of all households were made up of individuals and 14.2% had someone living alone who was 65 years of age or older.

There were 8,160 housing units, of which 12.5% were vacant. Among occupied housing units, 65.4% were owner-occupied and 34.6% were renter-occupied. The homeowner vacancy rate was 2.4% and the rental vacancy rate was 9.1%.

=== 2000 census ===
As of the census of 2000, there were 16,800 people, 6,847 households, and 4,697 families residing in the county. The population density was 70 per square mile (27/km^{2}). There were 7,754 housing units at an average density of 32 per square mile (12/km^{2}). The racial makeup of the county was 90.88% White, 7.16% Black or African American, 0.15% Native American, 0.37% Asian, 0.02% Pacific Islander, 0.57% from other races, and 0.85% from two or more races. 0.95% of the population were Hispanic or Latino of any race.

There were 6,847 households, out of which 31.30% had children under the age of 18 living with them, 54.20% were married couples living together, 11.10% had a female householder with no husband present, and 31.40% were non-families. 27.60% of all households were made up of individuals, and 12.80% had someone living alone who was 65 years of age or older. The average household size was 2.41 and the average family size was 2.92.

In the county, the population was spread out, with 24.10% under the age of 18, 8.00% from 18 to 24, 28.50% from 25 to 44, 23.90% from 45 to 64, and 15.50% who were 65 years of age or older. The median age was 38 years. For every 100 females, there were 93.70 males. For every 100 females age 18 and over, there were 89.50 males.

The median income for a household in the county was $30,195, and the median income for a family was $37,257. Males had a median income of $30,718 versus $21,216 for females. The per capita income for the county was $16,589. About 12.90% of families and 16.80% of the population were below the poverty line, including 23.60% of those under age 18 and 13.70% of those age 65 or over.

== Economy ==
A massive multi-billion dollar Artificial intelligence (AI) data center by Meta, is planned for Maysville.

== Communities ==
=== Cities ===
- Dover
- Germantown
- Maysville
- Sardis

=== Census-designated place ===
- Mays Lick

=== Other unincorporated places ===
- Fernleaf
- Helena
- Lewisburg
- Minerva
- Old Washington
- Orangeburg
- Shannon
- Somo
- Weedonia

== Politics ==
United States presidential election results for Mason County, Kentucky
Year	Republican		Democratic		Third party(ies)	
Year	No.	%	No.	%	No.	%
1912	1,558	33.83%	2,475	53.75%	572	12.42%
1916	2,127	42.54%	2,820	56.40%	53	1.06%
1920	3,743	44.16%	4,691	55.34%	42	0.50%
1924	3,406	48.28%	3,525	49.96%	124	1.76%
1928	5,012	59.79%	3,364	40.13%	6	0.07%
1932	3,213	38.55%	5,065	60.78%	56	0.67%
1936	3,317	41.63%	4,503	56.52%	147	1.85%
1940	3,704	45.63%	4,386	54.03%	27	0.33%
1944	3,256	45.83%	3,810	53.62%	39	0.55%
1948	2,519	40.13%	3,620	57.67%	138	2.20%
1952	3,606	49.89%	3,614	50.00%	8	0.11%
1956	3,880	51.80%	3,572	47.69%	38	0.51%
1960	4,334	57.89%	3,153	42.11%	0	0.00%
1964	2,437	35.05%	4,502	64.76%	13	0.19%
1968	2,661	40.50%	2,772	42.19%	1,137	17.31%
1972	3,529	58.46%	2,459	40.73%	49	0.81%
1976	2,529	42.12%	3,397	56.58%	78	1.30%
1980	2,926	46.54%	3,181	50.60%	180	2.86%
1984	3,751	58.19%	2,663	41.31%	32	0.50%
1988	3,158	53.57%	2,721	46.16%	16	0.27%
1992	2,432	40.34%	2,657	44.07%	940	15.59%
1996	2,588	46.72%	2,444	44.12%	507	9.15%
2000	3,572	60.82%	2,178	37.08%	123	2.09%
2004	4,381	61.89%	2,644	37.35%	54	0.76%
2008	4,102	57.60%	2,891	40.60%	128	1.80%
2012	4,197	60.99%	2,592	37.67%	92	1.34%
2016	4,944	68.49%	1,970	27.29%	305	4.22%
2020	5,477	68.82%	2,362	29.68%	119	1.50%
2024	5,621	71.14%	2,170	27.46%	110	1.39%

Mason County was at the time of the Civil War the easternmost of the strongly secessionist Bluegrass bloc. Mason was in fact the most easterly Kentucky county to be represented at the Russellville Convention of 1861 to discuss the secession of Kentucky from the Union.

Mason County's secessionist sentiment meant that it voted Democratic consistently up until the 1950s, with the exception of the 1928 election when strong local anti-Catholic sentiment against Al Smith allowed Herbert Hoover to carry the county. Since 1996 the county has shifted more strongly Republican in US presidential elections.

=== Elected officials ===
Elected officials as of January 3, 2025
U.S. House	Thomas Massie (R)	KY 4
Ky. Senate	Stephen West (R)	27
Ky. House	William Lawrence (R)	70

== Education ==
Mason County Schools operates public schools.

Schools:

- Mason County High School
- Mason County Middle School
- Mason County Intermediate School
- Straub Elementary School

In 1990 the Maysville Independent School District merged into the Mason County school district.

== Notable residents ==
- Joshua Bean (c. 1818–1852), first mayor of San Diego from 1850 until 1851
- Alvin Aaron Coffey Sr. (1822–1902) pioneer, homesteader, miner, and farmer in California; who was formerly enslaved
- Albert Sidney Johnston (1803–1862), Commander of the Army of the Republic of Texas, Secretary of War for Texas, Commander of the Western Department for the Confederacy. Died at the Battle of Shiloh.
- Judge Roy Bean (c. 1825–1903), Famous "Hanging Judge" of Texas (Law West of the Pecos).
- Deron Feldhaus, basketball player, member of "The Unforgettables".
- Chris Lofton (born 1986), played basketball for the University of Tennessee. 2003 Ky. "Mr. Basketball".
- Darius Miller (born 1990), Played basketball for University of Kentucky. 2012 NCAA Champion, 2008 Ky. "Mr. Basketball." Played for the New Orleans Pelicans.
- Florence K. Williamson-Norman (1893–1944), founder of Lambda Kappa Mu and charter member and executive secretary of National Council of Negro Women

== See also ==
- National Register of Historic Places listings in Mason County, Kentucky
