= Dover, Kentucky =

- City
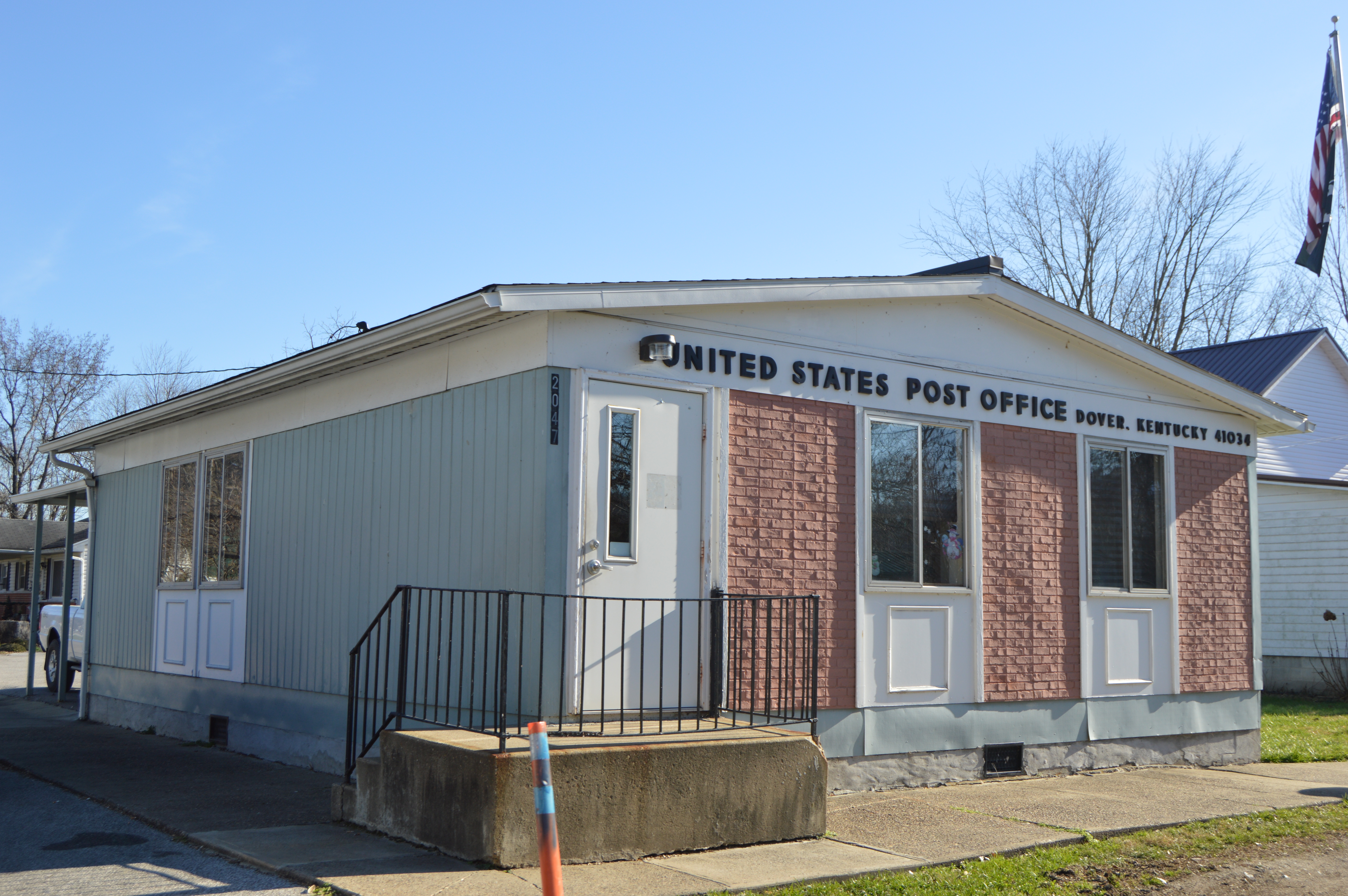
- Post office on Market Street

- Location in Mason County, Kentucky
- Coordinates: 38°45′23″N 83°53′04″W
- Country: United States
- State: Kentucky
- County: Mason

Area
  - Total: 0.45 sq mi (1.16 km^{2})
  - Land: 0.43 sq mi (1.12 km^{2})
  - Water: 0.019 sq mi (0.05 km^{2})
- Elevation: 532 ft (162 m)

Population (2020)
  - Total: 221
  - Density: 512.2/sq mi (197.78/km^{2})
- Time zone: UTC-5 (Eastern (EST))
  - Summer (DST): UTC-4 (EDT)
- ZIP code: 41034
- Area code: 606
- FIPS code: 21-22222
- GNIS feature ID: 2403505
- Website: https://cityofdoverkentucky.godaddysites.com/

Dover is a home rule-class city in Mason County, Kentucky, United States. The population was 221 at the 2020 census, down from 252 in 2010. It is part of the Maysville Micropolitan Statistical Area.

== History ==
The town of Dover was laid out by Arthur Fox Jr. in 1818 and possibly named for Dover, England, his father's hometown. A post office was established at Dover in 1833. Dover was incorporated in 1836.

== Geography ==
Dover is located on the south bank of the Ohio River and is bordered to the north by Brown County, Ohio. Kentucky Route 8 runs along the southern edge of the city; the highway leads southeast (upriver) 12 miles (19 km) to Maysville, the Mason county seat, and west (downriver) 7 miles (11 km) to Augusta.

According to the United States Census Bureau, Dover has a total area of 0.45 square miles (1.17 km^{2}), of which 0.02 square miles (0.05 km^{2}), or 4.01%, are water.

== Demographics ==
Historical population
Census	Pop.	Note	%±
1860	296		—
1870	532		79.7%
1880	446		−16.2%
1890	515		15.5%
1900	879		70.7%
1910	386		−56.1%
1920	377		−2.3%
1930	418		10.9%
1940	353		−15.6%
1950	334		−5.4%
1960	718		115.0%
1970	277		−61.4%
1980	305		10.1%
1990	297		−2.6%
2000	316		6.4%
2010	252		−20.3%
2020	221		−12.3%
U.S. Decennial Census

As of the census of 2000, there were 316 people, 115 households, and 93 families residing in the city. The population density was 640.8 inhabitants per square mile (247.4/km^{2}). There were 124 housing units at an average density of 251.4 per square mile (97.1/km^{2}). The racial makeup of the city was 97.15% White, 0.63% African American, 0.32% Native American, and 1.90% from two or more races.

There were 115 households, out of which 35.7% had children under the age of 18 living with them, 62.6% were married couples living together, 15.7% had a female householder with no husband present, and 19.1% were non-families. 16.5% of all households were made up of individuals, and 7.0% had someone living alone who was 65 years of age or older. The average household size was 2.75 and the average family size was 3.00.

In the city the population was spread out, with 29.7% under the age of 18, 8.5% from 18 to 24, 28.5% from 25 to 44, 19.3% from 45 to 64, and 13.9% who were 65 years of age or older. The median age was 35 years. For every 100 females, there were 91.5 males. For every 100 females age 18 and over, there were 103.7 males.

The median income for a household in the city was $33,125, and the median income for a family was $32,250. Males had a median income of $35,208 versus $16,023 for females. The per capita income for the city was $12,187. About 17.7% of families and 19.9% of the population were below the poverty line, including 20.5% of those under age 18 and 7.4% of those age 65 or over.

== See also ==
- List of cities and towns along the Ohio River
