= Germantown, Kentucky =

- City
- Location in Bracken County, Kentucky.
- Coordinates: 38°39′21″N 83°57′51″W
- Country: United States
- State: Kentucky
- Counties: Bracken, Mason
- Named for: German immigrants

Area
  - Total: 0.12 sq mi (0.32 km^{2})
  - Land: 0.12 sq mi (0.32 km^{2})
  - Water: 0 sq mi (0.00 km^{2})
- Elevation: 948 ft (289 m)

Population (2020)
  - Total: 146
  - Density: 1,192.5/sq mi (460.41/km^{2})
- Time zone: UTC-5 (Eastern (EST))
  - Summer (DST): UTC-4 (EDT)
- ZIP code: 41044
- Area code: 606
- FIPS code: 21-30718
- GNIS feature ID: 2403692

Germantown is a home rule-class city in Bracken and Mason counties in the U.S. state of Kentucky. The population was 146 at the 2020 census.

The Bracken County portion of Germantown is part of the Cincinnati/Northern Kentucky metropolitan area, while the Mason County portion is part of the Maysville micropolitan area.

== History ==
Germantown was platted in 1794 and named after German immigrants. The city was incorporated by the Virginia state legislature in 1795. A post office called "Germantown" has been in operation since 1817.

== Geography ==
Germantown is located primarily in eastern Bracken County and extends into western Mason County. Kentucky Route 10 passes through the center of town, leading east (via Kentucky Route 9) 13 miles (21 km) to Maysville on the Ohio River, and west 6 miles (10 km) to Brooksville, the Bracken County seat.

According to the U.S. Census Bureau, Germantown has a total area of 0.12 square miles (0.31 km^{2}), all land. The city sits on a ridge that drains north to Bracken Creek, east to Pommel Creek, south to Two Lick Creek, and southwest to Camp Creek. Bracken Creek is a direct tributary of the Ohio River, joining it at Augusta, while the other three creeks are all tributaries of the North Fork of the Licking River, which flows northwest to join the Ohio River at Covington and Newport.

== Demographics ==
Historical population
Census	Pop.	Note	%±
1800	81		—
1810	36		−55.6%
1830	118		—
1850	125		—
1860	170		36.0%
1870	191		12.4%
1890	229		—
1900	407		77.7%
1910	287		−29.5%
1920	237		−17.4%
1930	283		19.4%
1940	304		7.4%
1950	260		−14.5%
1960	251		−3.5%
1970	332		32.3%
1980	347		4.5%
1990	213		−38.6%
2000	190		−10.8%
2010	154		−18.9%
2020	146		−5.2%
U.S. Decennial Census

As of the census of 2000, there were 190 people, 81 households, and 55 families residing in the city. The population density was 703.5 inhabitants per square mile (271.6/km^{2}). There were 85 housing units at an average density of 314.7 per square mile (121.5/km^{2}). The racial makeup of the city was 98.42% White and 1.58% African American.

There were 81 households, out of which 29.6% had children under the age of 18 living with them, 60.5% were married couples living together, 6.2% had a female householder with no husband present, and 30.9% were non-families. 27.2% of all households were made up of individuals, and 14.8% had someone living alone who was 65 years of age or older. The average household size was 2.35 and the average family size was 2.77.

In the city, the population was spread out, with 22.6% under the age of 18, 7.9% from 18 to 24, 32.1% from 25 to 44, 17.9% from 45 to 64, and 19.5% who were 65 years of age or older. The median age was 39 years. For every 100 females, there were 88.1 males. For every 100 females age 18 and over, there were 86.1 males.

The median income for a household in the city was $27,500, and the median income for a family was $32,500. Males had a median income of $20,833 versus $22,813 for females. The per capita income for the city was $16,973. About 9.7% of families and 11.8% of the population were below the poverty line, including 16.7% of those under the age of eighteen and 20.4% of those 65 or over.

== Government ==
The government of Germantown is composed of a mayor and four city council members. Council members are elected every two years on even numbered years and the mayor is elected every four years, also on even years. The council member receiving the most votes in the council elections is designated as the vice-mayor.

The city also contains the Germantown Volunteer Fire Department, established in 1927, that operates in Bracken and Mason counties as a fire, rescue, and EMS first responder service.

== Notable people ==
- Carl Bouldin, baseball player
- Elle Smith, journalist and Miss USA 2021
