= Fred Norman (musician) =

American jazz composer and arranger (1911–1993)

- Born: Fred Douglas Norman; October 5, 1911; Leesburg, Florida, US
- Died: February 19, 1993 (aged 81) Manhattan, New York, US
- Occupations: Musician, composer, and arranger
- Instrument: Trombone
- Years active: 1932–1970s
- Formerly of: Claude Hopkins Orchestra Fred Norman & His Orchestra; Fred Norman's Orchestra Benny Goodman Band
- Spouse: Florence K. Williamson-Norman

Fred Douglas Norman (October 5, 1911 – February 19, 1993) was an American jazz composer, music arranger, trombonist, and singer. He worked with the Claude Hopkins Orchestra, the Benny Goodman Band, and many others. Radio personality and musician Ben Bernie called Norman "The Pride of Harlem".

== Early life ==
Norman was born on October 5, 1911 in Leesburg, Florida, the son of David F. Norman and Mary Jane (née Starke) Norman. He spent part of his childhood in Clearwater, Florida. In 1930, he graduated from Dunbar High School in Washington, D.C., where he played with the school orchestra.

Norman attended Bethune-Cookman College in Daytona Beach, Florida. Later, he graduated from Howard University in Washington, D.C.

== Career ==
Norman started his music career with the Claude Hopkins Orchestra in 1932 as a trombonist and singer. He also arranged music for the orchestra. He recorded his own composition", Church Street Sobbin’ Blues", as the trombone soloist with Hopkins's band in 1937 for Decca Records. Norman also appeared in short films with Hopkins's band during the 1930s.

Norman had his own orchestra, which performed as Fred Norman & His Orchestra and Fred Norman's Orchestra, in the late 1930s. In March 1939, Ben Bernie praised Norman's arrangement of "Lonesome Road" on during his radio show; Bernie had her Norman's orchestra play at the Hotel Pennsylvania. Bernie called Norman, "The Pride of Harlem", noting that Norman's arregment where a hit with audiences wherever he played.

Norman arranged swing music for Murrell Pitts of WNEW radio. He also arranged music for Eddie Cantor, Ben Bernie, Claude Hopkins, Melo-Art, Ozzie Nelson, Red Norvo, and Adrian Rollini. In 1938, Norman moved away from performance into work as a full-time music arranger. He began arranging and writing for the Benny Goodman Band and became the band's official arranger in November 1938. In November 1938, the band recorded his composition "Smoke House Rhythm". The band also played his "Home Coming Mama".

In the late 1930s and 1940s, Norman was an arranger for Bunny Berigan, Tommy Dorsey, Lionel Hampton, Gene Krupa, Teddy Powell, Artie Shaw, Charlie Spivak, and Jack Teagarden. In the 1950s, he was the music director and an arranger for several recording companies. He worked with singers Sarah Vaughan and Dinah Washington. He continued to work as an arranger until his retirement in the 1970s.

== Personal life ==
Norman married Florence K. Williamson-Norman, founder of the Washington Business Institute and the Lambda Kappa Mu business sorority. They lived in the Flushing Heights neighborhood of New York City. He supported her fundraising efforts for Lambda Kappa Mu; they served as co-chairs of the sorority's effort to secure donations of musical instruments for Bethune-Cookman College. He also wrote the sorority's song. The couple did not have children, but sponsored and housed Clara Bell Warner, the daughter of a sharecropper from Minerva, Kentucky, so that she could attend high school and college in New York City. Florence died in February 1944.

Norman was elected to the board of directors of the Coordinating Council for Negro Performers in 1953.

Norman died on February 19, 1993, aged 82, in Manhattan, New York, from pneumonia.

== Discography ==
The following are some recordings Fred Norman was involved in.

Date	Song	Artist	Label	Role	Ref.
January 11, 1934	"Minor Mania"	Claude Hopkins and His Orchestra	Columbia Records	songwriter	
September 14, 1934	"Chasing All the Blues Away"	Claude Hopkins and His Orchestra	Decca Records	instrumentalist, trombone, arranger	
September 14, 1934	"Just You, Just Me"	Claude Hopkins and His Orchestra	Decca Records	instrumentalist, trombone, arranger	
September 14, 1934	"King Porter Stomp"	Claude Hopkins and His Orchestra	Decca Records	instrumentalist, trombone, arranger	
September 14, 1934	"In the Shade of the Apple Tree"	Claude Hopkins and His Orchestra	Decca Records	instrumentalist, trombone, arranger	
September 14, 1934	"Who?"	Claude Hopkins and His Orchestra	Decca Records	instrumentalist, trombone, arranger	
October 22, 1934	"Walkin' the Dog"	Claude Hopkins and His Orchestra	Decca Records	instrumentalist, trombone, arranger	
October 22, 1934	"Sweetheart O' Mine"	Claude Hopkins and His Orchestra	Decca Records	instrumentalist, trombone, arranger	
October 22, 1934	"Monkey Business"	Claude Hopkins and His Orchestra	Decca Records	instrumentalist, trombone, arranger	
October 22, 1934	"Zozoi"	Claude Hopkins and His Orchestra	Decca Records	instrumentalist, trombone, arranger	
November 9, 1934	"Mandy"	Claude Hopkins and His Orchestra	Decca Records	instrumentalist, trombone, arranger	
November 9, 1934	"Do You Ever Think of Me?"	Claude Hopkins and His Orchestra	Decca Records	instrumentalist, trombone, arranger	
February 1, 1935	"Trees"	Claude Hopkins and His Orchestra	Decca Records	instrumentalist, trombone, arranger	
February 1, 1935	"Love in Bloom"	Claude Hopkins and His Orchestra	Decca Records	instrumentalist, trombone, arranger	
February 1, 1935	"June in January"	Claude Hopkins and His Orchestra	Decca Records	instrumentalist, trombone, arranger	
October 6, 1939	"Jamaica Jam-1"	Teddy Powell Orchestra	Decca Records	arranger	
November 10, 1938	"Smoke House Rhythm"	Benny Goodman Orchestra	Victor Records	composer	
April 3, 1939	"High Society"	Lionel Hampton Orchestra	Victor Records	arranger	
June 9, 1939	"If It's Good (Then I Want It)"	Lionel Hampton Orchestra	Victor Records	arranger	
June 9, 1939	"Stand by! For Further Announcements (And More Good News)"	Lionel Hampton Orchestra	Victor Records	arranger	
June 9, 1939	"Big Wig in the Wigwam"	Lionel Hampton Orchestra	Victor Records	arranger	
June 13, 1939	"Memories of You"	Lionel Hampton Orchestra	Victor Records	arranger	
May 7, 1941	"Boulder Buff"	Glenn Miller Orchestra	Victor Records	songwriter	
March 4, 1953	"Missing (One Heart)"	Damita Jo and The Rockets	Victor Records	songwriter	
February 23, 1945	"That's It"	Tommy Dorsey Orchestra	Victor Records	composer	
Apeil 15, 1946	"Flat Feet"	Charlie Spivak Orchestra	Victor Records	composer	
1953	"Venezuela"	Harry Belafonte		arranger	
