= Irma George Dixon =

Maryland politician, one of first two African American women elected to state legislature

- Dixon in 1963

Delegate to the Maryland General Assembly for Baltimore City
- In office 1959–1965

Personal details
- Born: Irma George; 1911
- Died: June 30, 1965 (aged 53–54) Montebelio State Hospital, Baltimore, Maryland
- Resting place: Arbutus Memorial Park, Baltimore, Maryland
- Citizenship: United States
- Party: Democratic
- Spouse: William B. Dixon
- Education: Morgan State University
- Occupation: Teacher, politician

Irma George Dixon (1911 – June 30, 1965) was a Maryland educator and politician. In 1958 she and Verda Freeman Welcome became the first two African American women elected to the Maryland General Assembly.

== Early life ==
Irma George was born on 1911 in Baltimore, Maryland, to Edward and Lillian George. She attended Baltimore public schools then Coppin Normal School before earning a B.S. in English at Morgan State College. She began her career as a teacher in Baltimore public schools, where she taught elementary and junior high for fifteen years. She retired from teaching in 1949 and began a small business, selling dresses from her home at 1906 McCulloh Street. In 1950, she married William B. Dixon, who was an insurance broker and bail bondsman.

== Political life ==
In 1958 Dixon was elected to the Maryland General Assembly's House of Delegates, representing Baltimore City. With Verda Freeman Welcome, they became the first two African American women elected to Maryland General Assembly. A Democrat, Dixon served from 1960 through re-election for the 1964 term, until her death in 1965 (she missed the final session because she was hospitalized).

Dedicated to fighting for racial uplift, in 1962 Dixon sponsored a bill that proposed to ban racial discrimination in private employment throughout Maryland. She was also a committed Democrat, though, and in 1958 refused to join a coalition ticket of all African American candidates, choosing instead to support a straight Democratic ticket. She criticized the coalition as having "chosen their candidates solely on the basis of color, which in itself is an act of segregation in its worst form."

A former teacher, she was a strong advocate for education in the legislature, proposing considering tax increase to pay for increased funding for education, as well as making schooling compulsory beginning in kindergarten. Of the latter policy, which became law, she said, "Today's truant is tomorrow's dropout."

She was also an advocate of equal pay for men and women.

As a legislator, she was known for keeping in touch with constituents by passing out self-addressed stamped postcards with the invitation to send her their concerns.

During the 1964 United States presidential election, Dixon was a field representative for Democratic National Committee, traveling the East Coast to support voter registration. Over the years Dixon was also involved in numerous advocacy groups and clubs, including as a legislative consultant to legislative consultant to the health commission of the Maryland State Conference of Social Welfare; as a member of the executive board of the Baltimore Urban League (1950 to 1952); the advisory board of the Department of Public Welfare; the NAACP; Life Members Guild, National Council of Negro Women; The School Marms; YWCA; and Lambda Kappa Mu.

== Death ==
Irma George Dixon died on June 30, 1965, at Montebelio State Hospital in Baltimore, following a long illness for which she had been hospitalized for the previous seven months. She is buried at Arbutus Memorial Park. Her husband predeceased her, in March 1963. She was survived by two brothers, Edward George and Benjamin Thornton, both of whom were then living in Washington, D.C.
