= Mason County Schools (Kentucky) =

School district in Kentucky, USA

Location
- Mason County, Kentucky; United States

District information
- Type: Public School District
- Grades: Preschool-Grade 12
- Superintendent: Rick Ross
- School board: Mason County Schools Board of Education
- Schools: 4
- Budget: $35,708,302

Students and staff
- Students: 2,588
- Teachers: 165

Mason County Schools is a public school district headquartered in Maysville, Kentucky. The district serves the rural area of Mason County, Kentucky with a population of approximately 17,150 in 2018.

In 1990, the Maysville Independent School District merged into the Mason County school district.

== Schools ==
- Mason County High School
- Mason County Middle School
- Mason County Intermediate School
- Straub Elementary School
- Area Technology Center

== Board of education ==
The district is governed by the Mason County Schools Board of Education, composed of five elected members. For the 2019–20 academic year, the board was governed by:

Name	Position
Vicky Lowe	Chair
Melissa Simmons	Vice Chair
Dr. Michael Coleman	Member
Janet West	Member
Stephenie Gardner	Member
