= Mai Padmore =

Liberian politician (1916–1988)

Edith Mai Padmore, née Wiles, (August 20, 1916 – July 3, 1988) was a Liberian politician. She became Liberia's first female cabinet minister when she was appointed Minister of Health and Welfare in 1972.

== Life ==
Mai Wiles was born on August 20, 1916, in Monrovia. She was the daughter of Richard Wiles, Speaker of the House of Representatives of Liberia, and Mai Grimes, sister of Louis Arthur Grimes, a Chief Justice of Liberia. Her father's mother was Vai and her other grandparents were from the West Indies. She was educated at the Trinity Parish School and the College of West Africa, where she graduated at the top of her class in 1934 or 1935. She taught for a year after graduation. After training at the Eugenia Simpson Cooper Secretarial School, she became personal secretary to President Edwin J. Barclay.

In April 1939 she married the future diplomat George A. Padmore. From 1940 to 1950 she was secretary to the general manager of the Firestone Plantation Company. She then became Executive Secretary to President Tubman from 1951 to 1955. In 1956 she accompanied her husband to the United States, where he had been appointed Ambassador. She helped organize the 1959 Saniquellie Conference and the 1962 Monrovia Conference which led to the Organisation of African Unity. From 1963 to 1971 she was Special Assistant to President Tubman.

President William Tolbert appointed Padmore as Minister of Health and Welfare on January 11, 1972. She was minister until 1973.

Padmore was active in the Episcopal Diocese of Liberia. Mai Padmore was a member of the Alpha Kappa Alpha sorority. She died on July 3, 1988.
