= Helena, Kentucky =

Unincorporated community in Kentucky, United States

- Unincorporated community
- Location within Kentucky Location within the United States
- Coordinates: 38°29′36″N 83°46′31″W
- Country: United States
- State: Kentucky
- County: Mason
- Elevation: 827 ft (252 m)
- Time zone: UTC-5 (Eastern (EST))
  - Summer (DST): UTC-4 (EST)
- Area code: 606
- GNIS feature ID: 494005

Helena is an unincorporated community in Mason County, Kentucky, United States.
