= Orangeburg, Kentucky =

Unincorporated community in Kentucky, United States

- Unincorporated community
- Location within Kentucky Location within the United States
- Coordinates: 38°34′03″N 83°41′20″W
- Country: United States
- State: Kentucky
- County: Mason
- Elevation: 774 ft (236 m)
- Time zone: UTC-5 (Eastern (EST))
  - Summer (DST): UTC-4 (EST)
- Area code: 606
- GNIS feature ID: 499971

Orangeburg is an unincorporated community in Mason County, Kentucky, United States. Orangeburg is located at the junction of Kentucky Route 1234 and Kentucky Route 1449 5.9 miles (9.5 km) south-southeast of Maysville.

The Milton Mills in Orangeburg are listed on the National Register of Historic Places.
