= New York City Federation of Women's Clubs =

- Established: February 16, 1903
- Founder: Belle de Rivera (co-founder)
- Founded at: Manhattan
- Purpose: Promote good fellowship, strengthen the bonds of club life, and to acquire the power for united action in the advancement of civic improvements, educational interests and philanthropic work
- Headquarters: Hotel Astor
- Region served: New York City
- President: General Federation of Women's Clubs

New York City Federation of Women's Clubs (organized February 16, 1903; incorporated 1905) was an American women's organization located in Manhattan, New York. The work of the Federation was done through its 26 committees, embracing all lines of social and educational work. Belle de Rivera was its first president.

== History ==
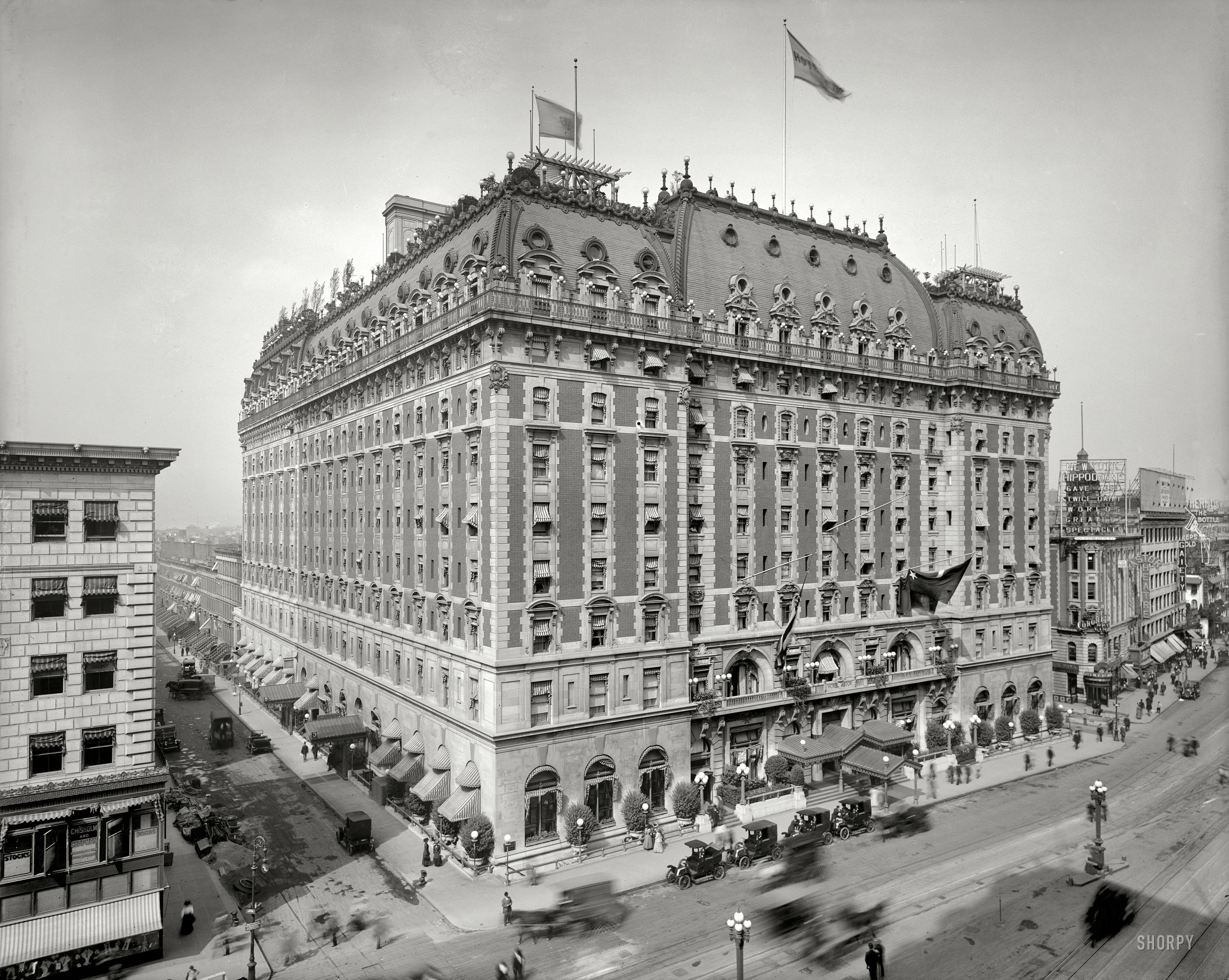
Hotel Astor, the club's home

The New York City Federation of Women's Clubs was organized February 16, 1903, with 25 charter clubs. The object of the organization is to promote good fellowship, strengthen the bonds of club life, and to acquire the power for united action in the advancement of civic improvements, educational interests and philanthropic work. The three conventions of the year were held at the Hotel Astor in October, February and May, at which each club is represented by its president and two delegates. At the Annual Meeting held in February the officers of the Federation were elected to serve two years. The work of the Federation was done by committees, and the chair and members of each committee were chosen from clubs working along similar lines.

The club established the City Federation Hotel at 462 West 22d St. for businesswomen.

In 1906, it had a membership of 56 clubs and more than 200 associate members. In 1911, it was composed of 120 constituent clubs, with a membership of about 30,000. There were 80,000 members in 1922. Its membership in 1940 was approximately 22,500. There were more than 100,000 members in 1961.

== Presidents ==
- Belle de Rivera, first president
- 1911, Mrs. William Grant Brown
- 1914, Florence Guernsey
- 1916, Mrs. Eugene J. Grant
- 1917–19, Rita A. Whitbeck Yawger (Mrs. John Francis Yawger)
- 1922, Sara Griswold Chapman (Mrs. Richard M. Chapman)
- 1927, Mrs. William D. Sporborg
- 1928, Cora B. Thomas
- 1928, Sara Graham Mulhall
- 1940, Mrs. Rudolph M. Binder
- 1961, Mrs. Charles P. Adams
- Helen M. Clark
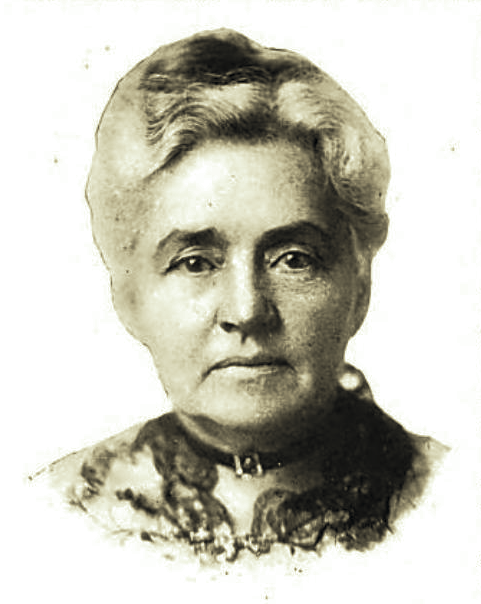
Belle de Rivers

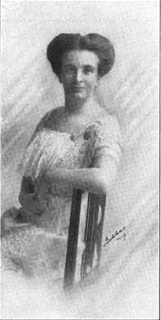
Mrs. William Grant Brown

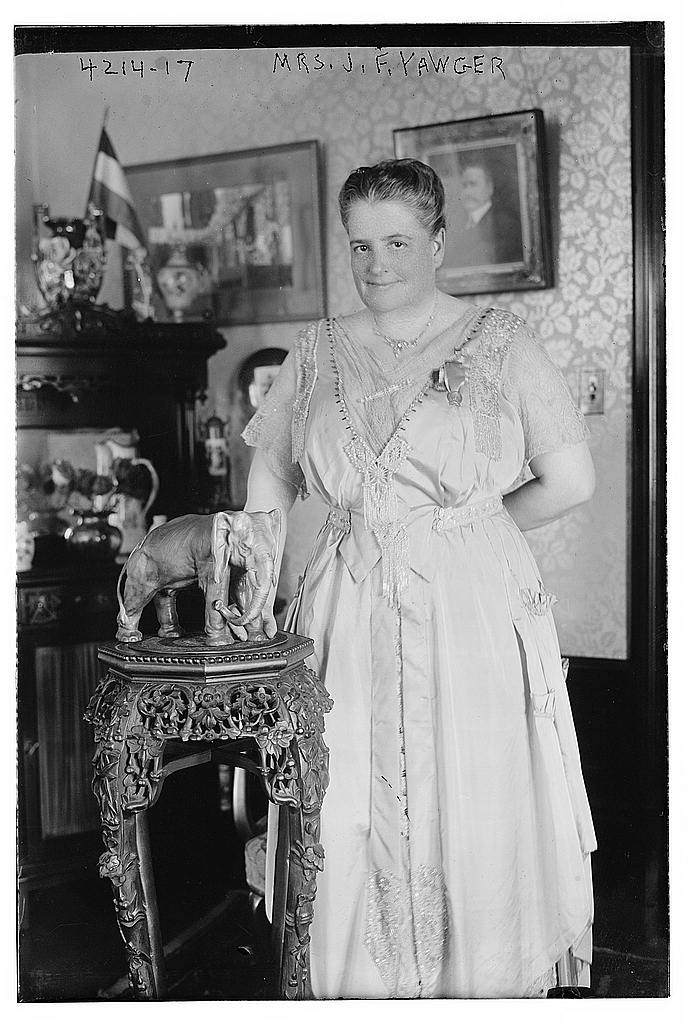
Mrs. John Francis Yawger

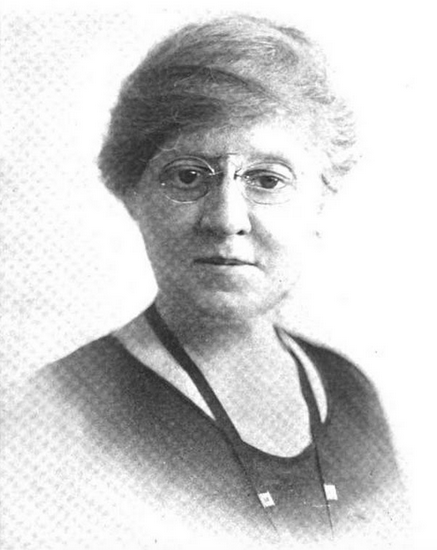
Sara Griswold Chapman
