= Fernleaf, Kentucky =

Unincorporated community in Kentucky, United States

- Unincorporated community
- Location within Kentucky Location within the United States
- Coordinates: 38°39′22″N 83°54′48″W
- Country: United States
- State: Kentucky
- County: Mason
- Elevation: 945 ft (288 m)
- Time zone: UTC-5 (Eastern (EST))
  - Summer (DST): UTC-4 (EST)
- Area code: 606
- GNIS feature ID: 507992

Fernleaf is an unincorporated community in Mason County, Kentucky, United States.
