= Somo, Kentucky =

Unincorporated community in Kentucky, United States

- Unincorporated community
- Location within Kentucky Location within the United States
- Coordinates: 38°35′48″N 83°44′33″W
- Country: United States
- State: Kentucky
- County: Mason
- Elevation: 846 ft (258 m)
- Time zone: UTC-5 (Eastern (EST))
  - Summer (DST): UTC-4 (EST)
- Area code: 606
- GNIS feature ID: 515534

Somo is an unincorporated community in Mason County, Kentucky, United States. The closest incorporated settlement is Lewisburg, Kentucky.

Somo lies on the intersection of Kentucky Route 9 and Kentucky Route 3313. The community is approximately 2.5 miles away from the Ohio River, and by extension the Ohio state border.
