= Sardis, Kentucky =

- City
- Location in Mason County, Kentucky
- Coordinates: 38°32′05″N 83°57′26″W
- Country: United States
- State: Kentucky
- Counties: Mason, Robertson

Area
  - Total: 1.00 sq mi (2.59 km^{2})
  - Land: 1.00 sq mi (2.59 km^{2})
  - Water: 0 sq mi (0.00 km^{2})
- Elevation: 961 ft (293 m)

Population (2020)
  - Total: 60
  - Density: 60/sq mi (23.2/km^{2})
- Time zone: UTC-5 (Eastern (EST))
  - Summer (DST): UTC-4 (EDT)
- ZIP code: 41056
- Area code: 606
- FIPS code: 21-68646
- GNIS feature ID: 2405424

Sardis is a home rule-class city in Mason and Robertson counties in the U.S. state of Kentucky. The population was 60 as of the 2020 census, down from 103 in 2010.

== Geography ==
Sardis is located in southwestern Mason County and eastern Robertson County with the majority in Mason County. U.S. Route 62 passes through the center of town, leading northeast 17 miles (27 km) to Maysville, the Mason County seat, and west 5 miles (8 km) to Mount Olivet, the Robertson County seat.

According to the United States Census Bureau, Sardis has a total area of 1.0 square mile (2.6 km^{2}), of which 0.001 square miles (0.003 km^{2}), or 0.1%, are water. Sardis sits on a ridge which drains north to Smith Branch and Shannon Creek, a tributary of the North Fork of the Licking River; and south to Five Lick Creek, a tributary via Johnson Creek of the main stem of the Licking River, which flows northwest to the Ohio River at Covington.

The Mason County portion of Sardis is part of the Maysville micropolitan area.

== Demographics ==
Historical population
Census	Pop.	Note	%±
1870	149		—
1880	224		50.3%
1890	255		13.8%
1900	257		0.8%
1910	261		1.6%
1930	201		—
1940	208		3.5%
1950	176		−15.4%
1960	190		8.0%
1970	175		−7.9%
1980	198		13.1%
1990	171		−13.6%
2000	149		−12.9%
2010	103		−30.9%
2020	60		−41.7%
U.S. Decennial Census

As of the census of 2000, there were 149 people, 58 households, and 36 families residing in the city. The population density was 305.1 inhabitants per square mile (117.8/km^{2}). There were 64 housing units at an average density of 131.1 per square mile (50.6/km^{2}). The racial makeup of the city was 99.33% White, and 0.67% from two or more races.

There were 58 households, out of which 27.6% had children under the age of 18 living with them, 37.9% were married couples living together, 20.7% had a female householder with no husband present, and 37.9% were non-families. 31.0% of all households were made up of individuals, and 17.2% had someone living alone who was 65 years of age or older. The average household size was 2.50 and the average family size was 3.08.

In the city, the population was spread out, with 21.5% under the age of 18, 12.1% from 18 to 24, 24.2% from 25 to 44, 21.5% from 45 to 64, and 20.8% who were 65 years of age or older. The median age was 42 years. For every 100 females, there were 75.3 males. For every 100 females age 18 and over, there were 72.1 males.

The median income for a household in the city was $14,886, and the median income for a family was $27,917. Males had a median income of $22,188 versus $14,375 for females. The per capita income for the city was $9,881. There were 14.3% of families and 31.6% of the population living below the poverty line, including 40.0% of under eighteens and 36.0% of those over 64.
