= Lambda Kappa Mu =

African American business sorority

- ΛΚΜ
- Founded: January 19, 1937; 89 years ago Brooklyn, New York
- Type: Professional
- Affiliation: Coalition of Black Business Sororities
- Status: Active
- Emphasis: African American - Business
- Scope: National (US)
- Pillars: Sisterhood, Achievement, Service, Scholarship
- Colors: Red and White
- Symbol: Oak leaf
- Publication: Acorn
- Chapters: 19 active, 41 chartered
- Headquarters: 1629 K Street, NW Suite 300; Washington, D.C. 20006; United States
- Website: www.lkmsorority.org

Lambda Kappa Mu Sorority Inc. (ΛΚΜ) is an African American business sorority. It is a Greek-lettered business sorority established by African American women in New York City in 1937. It has established more than 40 chapters in the United States. The sorority is a member of the Coalition of Black Business Sororities.

== History ==
Lambda Kappa Mu was founded on January 19, 1937, in the Upper Manhattan YMCA in New York City. It was founded by Florence K. Williamson-Norman and a group of 25 charter members, all African American college educated women working in various business fields. The sorority was formed to foster fellowship and stimulate businesswomen to greater personal advancement, cultural awareness and an appreciation of Black women's progress.

Later in 1937, Williamson-Norman estalbished the Beta chapter in New York City and Gamma chapter in Brooklyn. The sorority was incorporated in the State of New York on March 15, 1938. Philitus Joyce was its first grand basilei or president. Lambda Kappa Mu affiliated with the National Council of Negro Women in 1939. In 1940, the Delta chapter was established in Long Island, followed by the Epsilon chapter in Newark, New Jersey. In 1940, Williamson-Norman was the sorority's representative to the National Pan-Hellenic Council.

One of the sorority's earliest projects was a nationwide campaign established in 1940 to support the music program at Bethune-Cookman College, raising funds to purchase instruments and creating a scholarship for a female senior student. Benny Goodman donated a $650 drum kit for this effort. Florence Norman served on the college's board and was married to Fred Norman, an alumnus of the college and a former arranger for Goodman. Gladys Hampton, the sorority member in charge of the music project, was married to Lionel Hampton, a member of Goodman's band. Artie Bernstein, also of Goodman's band, donated a bass violin. Cab Calloway donated a saxophone.

In 1940, Lambda Kappa Mu sponsored an annual Week of Progress, with chapters holding events such as a typewriting contest, spelling bee, debate, a quiz and business clinics. The sorority also established a scholarship to help a member continue her education.

Lambda Kappa Mu help its first national convention on June 22, 1940 at the Harlem YWCA. at 137th Street in New York City. More than 75 people attended the dinner session and there were thirteen delegates from nine states for the sorority's business sessions. During the meeting, plans were made for a national survey of Black women in business. The sorority also adopted resolutions to support socialized medicine and to condemn the segregation of the United States Army and the United States Navy. In June 1961, it installed its first chapter in the Southeastern United States, the Sigma chapter in Hampton, Virginia.

Lambda Kappa Mu is a member of the Coalition of Black Business Sororities, which also includes Iota Phi Lambda, Gamma Phi Delta and Eta Phi Beta. Lambda Kappa Mu is not a National Pan Hellenic Council (NPHC) sorority; dual membership within NPHC sororities is allowed.

== Symbols ==
The ideals or pillars of Lambda Kappa Mu are Sisterhood, Achievement, Service and Scholarship. Its colors are Red and White. Its emblem is an oak leaf. Lambda Kappa Mu's publication is the Acorn, first published on June 21, 1941. The sorority's song was written by Fred Norman.

== Activities ==
Lambda Kappa Mu has a national youth mentorship program for middle and high girls called the Kopelles. The Kopelles was established in 1962 by Catherine Cowell. The sorority also provides scholarships for girls to attend college.

== Governance ==
Lambda Kappa Mu is overseen by a national executive board. Its officers include grand basileus (president), first anti-basileus (vice-president), second anti-basileus, executive grammateus (secretary), recording/corresponding grammateus, tamiochus (treasurer), assistant tamiochus, epistoleus (journalist), historian, and regional syntakte (director) for the Northeastern United States, Western United States and Southern United States.

The sorority's national headquarters is in Washington, D.C.

== Chapters ==
The following are the chapters of Lambda Kappa Mu, with active chapters indicated in black and inactive chapters in italics.

Chapter	Charter date and range	Location	Region	Status	Ref.
Alpha	January 19, 1937	Brooklyn, New York	Northeastern	Inactive	
Beta	1937	New York City, New York	Northeastern	Inactive	(Note: Chapter was installed in October 1939.)
Gamma	January 19, 1937	Brooklyn, New York	Northeastern	Active	
Delta	March 15, 1940	Long Island, New York	Northeastern	Inactive	
Epsilon	June 9, 1940	Newark, New Jersey	Northeastern	Inactive	
Zeta	1943	Pittsburgh, Pennsylvania	Northeastern	Inactive	(Note: The chapter was organized in 1941.)
Eta	1943	New York City, New York	Northeastern	Inactive	
Theta	January 12, 1946	Washington, D.C.	Southern	Active	
Iota	March 8, 1947	Baltimore, Maryland	Southern	Active	
Kappa	November 19, 1947	Boston, Massachusetts	Northeastern	Active	
Lambda	March 20, 1948	Staten Island, New York	Northeastern	Active	
Mu	June 1948	Philadelphia, Pennsylvania	Northeastern	Active	
Nu	June 9, 1951	New York City, New York	Northeastern	Active	
Xi	April 23, 1955	Syracuse, New York	Northeastern	Active	
Omicron	1956	Grand Rapids, Michigan	Western	Inactive	
Pi	1956	Detroit, Michigan	Western	Inactive	
Rho	1958	Milwaukee, Wisconsin	Western	Inactive	
Sigma	May 20, 1961	Hampton, Virginia	Southern	Active	
Tau	1962	Newport News, Virginia	Southern	Inactive	
Upsilon	May 18, 1963	New York City, New York	Northeastern	Active	
Phi	1964	Flint, Michigan	Western	Inactive	
Chi	June 19, 1965	Paterson, New Jersey	Northeastern	Active	
Psi	June 21, 1969	Chicago, Illinois	Northeastern	Active	
Omega				Memorial	
Alpha Alpha	1974	Columbus, Ohio	Western	Inactive	
Alpha Beta	June 5, 1976	Los Angeles, California	Western	Active	
Alpha Gamma	1976	San Diego, California	Western	Active	
Alpha Delta	1978	Seattle, Washington	Western	Inactive	
Alpha Epsilon	1976	Bridgeport, Connecticut	Northeastern	Inactive	
Alpha Zeta	1977	Las Vegas, Nevada	Western	Inactive	
Alpha Eta	1977	Macon, Georgia	Southern	Inactive	
Alpha Theta	November 3, 1978	Rome, New York	Northeastern	Active	
Alpha Iota	1980	Providence, Rhode Island	Northeastern	Inactive	
Alpha Kappa	1982	West Palm Beach, Florida	Southern	Inactive	
Alpha Lambda	1984	Tallassee, Alabama	Southern	Inactive	
Alpha Mu	1985	Brunswick, Maine	Northeastern	Inactive	
Alpha Nu	1987	Savannah, Georgia	Southern	Inactive	
Alpha Xi	September 8, 1990	Pittsburgh, Pennsylvania	Northeastern	Inactive	(Note: The chapter was organized in 1990.)
Alpha Omicron	January 11, 1992	Long Beach, California	Western	Active	
Alpha Pi				Unassigned ?	
Alpha Rho	November 2017	Macon, Georgia	Southern	Active	
Alpha Sigma	July 31, 2021	Fredericksburg, Virginia	Southern	Active	
Alpha Tau	April 29, 2022	Atlanta Georgia	Southern	Active	

== Notable members ==
- Bessye J. Bearden, deputy collector of Internal Revenue for the State of New York and correspondent for the Chicago Defender
- Mary McLeod Booth, founder of the National Council of Negro Women and Bethune-Cookman University
- Irma George Dixon, Maryland politician, one of first two African American women elected to state legislature

=== Honorary ===
- Catherine Basie, American dancer, philanthropist and advocate

== Controversies and scandals ==
=== Prize-fight benefit ===
Lambda Kappa Mu scheduled a benefit for Bethune-Cookman College at the Polo Grounds in New York City for August 22, 1940, including an all-star boxing match and the music of Louis Armstrong, Count Bassie, Cab Calloway, Benny Goodman, Gene Krupa and Jimmy Lunceford. The forty rounds of boxing were to include a demonstration by Jack Dempse, a Red Burman fight, a world championship bantamweight match between Georgie Pace and Louis Salica, and a competition for lightweight crown of New York State. The boxing was coordinated by prize-fight promoter, Fred Irvin, husband of sorority member Helen C. Smith Irvin. The benefit was planned to raise $30,000 for a new music building for the college.

Eleanor Roosevelt came to New York City to purchase the first ticket for the benefit. However, the championship fight was cancelled at the last minute for unknown reasons, leaving the sorority with a deficite of $2,000, used for promotion and advertising. Newspapers reported that the Polo Grounds had never received the $5,000 rental deposit from the event's sponsors and Irvin had rescheduled the prize-fight for another date and venue. Sorority founder Florence Norman told The New York Age, "Neither Lambda Kappa Mu Sorority nor Bethune-Cookman College has any connection with the fight being promoted at Queensboro Stadium by Fred Irwin on August 29. We have withdrawn completely from any events which may be sponsored by Mr. Irvin."

Irvin told The Afro American that the benefit was cancelled because, a week before the event, the Boxing Commission demanded that he deposit $13,000 with the New York State Athletic Commission; within an hour, the Polo Club demanded a $5,000 deposit that had to be paid within the next hour. These advance fees were unprecedented in this history of boxing, according to Irvin. Irvin had received $8,500 in donations from his friends that he had used to promote the event; he was going to lose that money if he did not immediately come up with $18,000 before any tickets for the benefit had been sold.

However, the venue and the sports commission both claimed that these payments were part of their original contract with Lambda Kappa Mu, being a 25 percent down payment for the venue rental and a forfeit to ensure that the boxers would be paid after the fight. Irvin said the ticket sales for the benefit would have drawn $75,000 if the event had taken place at the Polo Grounds.

== See also ==
- Professional fraternities and sororities
- List of African-American fraternities
