= Chicago Business College =

Business school in Chicago, Illinois, US

Coordinates: 41°53′3.0″N 87°37′35.4″W

The Chicago Business College (founded as the Gondering and Virden Business College in 1888) was a for-profit business school located at 67 Wabash Avenue in downtown Chicago, Illinois. It was run by Frederick B. Virden, who founded or purchased several such schools in subsequent years.
