= Minerva, Kentucky =

Unincorporated community in Kentucky, United States

- Unincorporated community
- Location within Kentucky Location within the United States
- Coordinates: 38°42′19″N 83°55′09″W
- Country: United States
- State: Kentucky
- County: Mason
- Elevation: 945 ft (288 m)
- Time zone: UTC-5 (Eastern (EST))
  - Summer (DST): UTC-4 (EST)
- ZIP codes: 41062
- Area code: 606
- GNIS feature ID: 498407

Minerva is an unincorporated community in Mason County, Kentucky, United States.

== History ==
A post office has been in operation at Minerva since 1810. Minerva was incorporated in 1844.

== Notable person ==
- Stanley Forman Reed (1884–1980), Associate Justice of the Supreme Court of the United States
