= Kentucky Route 915 =

State highway in Kentucky, United States

Kentucky Route 915
- KY 915 highlighted in red

Route information
- Maintained by KYTC
- Length: 9.295 mi (14.959 km)

Major junctions
- South end: US 27 in Claryville
- KY 10 in Alexandria
- North end: AA Hwy (KY 9) in Wilder

Location
- Country: United States
- State: Kentucky
- Counties: Campbell

Highway system
- Kentucky State Highway System; Interstate; US; State; Parkways
← KY 914	→ KY 916

Kentucky Route 915 (KY 915) is a road that runs from the city limits of Wilder, Kentucky, to just outside Alexandria, Kentucky, where it joins U.S. 27. The road is a windy, curvy road which has many houses along its path.

== Route description ==
From Wilder, it follows the Licking River for a short while before the river turns north to meet the Ohio River. After that it turns south to head towards Alexandria. The road continues to twist and turn past the city of Cold Spring and through Alexandria. KY 10's west end is at a junction with 915. At this junction, 915 turns right at a 90-degree angle and continues, only to turn back to its original direction soon after. After a four-way junction with KY 536, it continues, roughly paralleling U.S. 27. The road ends at Campbell County High School, where it turns left and meets U.S. 27. Continuing straight, a road commonly referred to as KY 915 continues a short while before also meeting U.S. 27.

== History ==
KY 915 was the original route of KY 9, but the AA Highway was cosigned with KY 9 to prevent a numbering quagmire.

== Major intersections ==
The entire route is in Campbell County.

Location	mi	km	Destinations	Notes
Claryville	0.000	0.000	US 27	Southern terminus, Camel Crossing
Alexandria	1.795	2.889	KY 536	
Alexandria	2.322	3.737	KY 10 east (West Main Street)	Western terminus of KY 10
Alexandria	5.982	9.627	KY 2924 (Tollgate Road)	
Wilder	9.295	14.959	AA Hwy (KY 9)	Northern terminus
1.000 mi = 1.609 km; 1.000 km = 0.621 mi
