= Silver Grove =

Silver Grove may refer to:

== Places ==
- Silver Grove, Kentucky
- Silver Grove, Tennessee
- Silver Grove, West Virginia

== See also ==
- Silver Grove School (Kentucky), secondary school located in Silver Grove, Kentucky
- Silver Grove Independent Schools, school district located in Silver Grove, Kentucky
