= Highland Heights, Kentucky =

- City
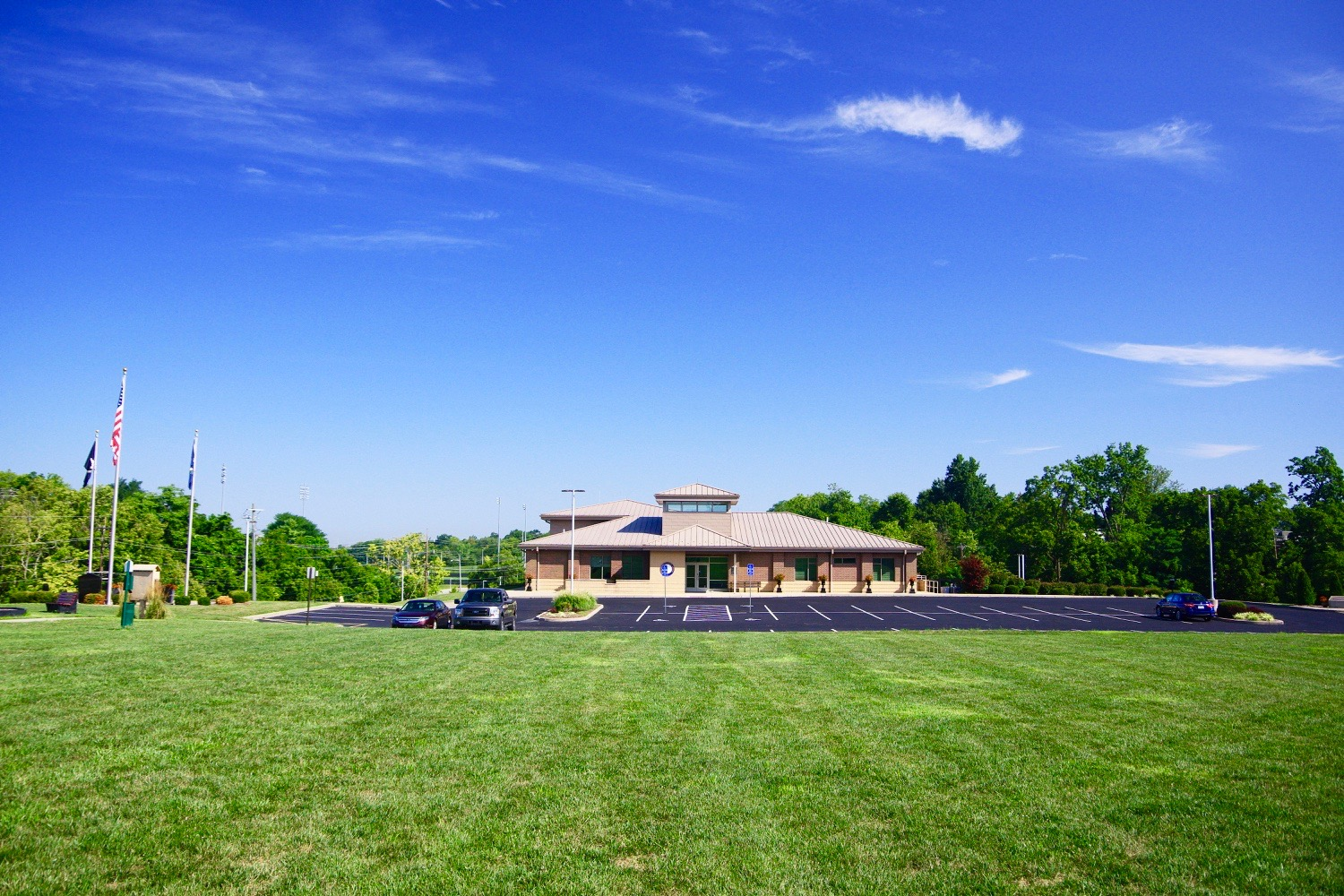
- Municipal complex
- Motto: "Growth Through Progress"
- Location of Highland Heights in Campbell County, Kentucky.
- Coordinates: 39°02′08″N 84°27′24″W
- Country: United States
- State: Kentucky
- County: Campbell

Area
  - Total: 2.62 sq mi (6.79 km^{2})
  - Land: 2.62 sq mi (6.79 km^{2})
  - Water: 0 sq mi (0.00 km^{2})
- Elevation: 843 ft (257 m)

Population (2020)
  - Total: 6,662
  - Estimate (2022): 6,418
  - Density: 2,542.4/sq mi (981.63/km^{2})
- Time zone: UTC-5 (Eastern (EST))
  - Summer (DST): UTC-4 (EDT)
- ZIP codes: 41076, 41099
- Area code: 859
- FIPS code: 21-36604
- GNIS feature ID: 2404699
- Website: hhky.com

Highland Heights is a home rule-class city in Campbell County, Kentucky, United States. The population was 6,662 at the 2020 census.

Highland Heights is home to Northern Kentucky University and General Cable, a Fortune 500 company whose present headquarters were constructed in 1992. It is located in the Cincinnati metropolitan area.

== History ==
The area has been known as "the Highlands" since the 19th century. The District of the Highlands was incorporated in 1867; Fort Thomas was separately incorporated from its northern reaches in 1914. The local post office was established in 1927, and the community of Highland Heights incorporated itself separately the same year.

Northern Kentucky State College, previously sited in Park Hills, was relocated to a larger campus in the city in 1971. It is now known as Northern Kentucky University (NKU), and subsidiary businesses and related developments have grown in the city.

In October 2012, Highland Heights resident Ryan Poston was murdered in his home. The perpetrator was his girlfriend, Shayna Hubers, who shot him six times. The case and trials attracted considerable media attention.

== Geography ==
Highland Heights is located in northern Campbell County. It is bordered to the north by Fort Thomas, to the west by Wilder, and to the south by Cold Spring. Interstate 275, the beltway around Cincinnati, runs along the western and northern edges of Highland Heights. Its interchange with Interstate 471 is at the northern border of Highland Heights. Via I-471, Highland Heights is 7 miles (11 km) southeast of downtown Cincinnati.

According to the United States Census Bureau, the city has a total area of 2.6 square miles (6.7 km^{2}), all land.

== Demographics ==
Historical population
Census	Pop.	Note	%±
1930	625		—
1940	855		36.8%
1950	1,569		83.5%
1960	3,491		122.5%
1970	4,543		30.1%
1980	4,435		−2.4%
1990	4,223		−4.8%
2000	5,153		22.0%
2010	6,923		34.3%
2020	6,662		−3.8%
2024 (est.)	6,292		−5.6%
U.S. Decennial Census

=== 2020 census ===
As of the 2020 census, Highland Heights had a population of 6,662. The median age was 27.2 years. 11.3% of residents were under the age of 18 and 15.1% of residents were 65 years of age or older. For every 100 females there were 85.4 males, and for every 100 females age 18 and over there were 83.3 males age 18 and over.

99.8% of residents lived in urban areas, while 0.2% lived in rural areas.

There were 2,800 households in Highland Heights, of which 15.9% had children under the age of 18 living in them. Of all households, 27.5% were married-couple households, 27.3% were households with a male householder and no spouse or partner present, and 37.8% were households with a female householder and no spouse or partner present. About 41.3% of all households were made up of individuals and 14.7% had someone living alone who was 65 years of age or older.

There were 2,960 housing units, of which 5.4% were vacant. The homeowner vacancy rate was 1.7% and the rental vacancy rate was 4.9%.

Racial composition as of the 2020 census
Race	Number	Percent
White	5,580	83.8%
Black or African American	414	6.2%
American Indian and Alaska Native	27	0.4%
Asian	131	2.0%
Native Hawaiian and Other Pacific Islander	9	0.1%
Some other race	156	2.3%
Two or more races	345	5.2%
Hispanic or Latino (of any race)	184	2.8%

=== 2010 census ===
As of the census of 2010, there were 6,923 people, 2,610 households, and 1,282 families residing in the city. The population density was 2,881.9 inhabitants per square mile (1,112.7/km^{2}). There were 2,787 housing units at an average density of 1,225.5 per square mile (473.2/km^{2}). The racial makeup of the city was 90.8% White, 5% African American, 0.2% Native American, 2% Asian, less than 0.01%% Pacific Islander, 0.5% from other races, and 1.6% from two or more races. Hispanic or Latino of any race were 1.1% of the population.

There were 2,610 households, of which 18.4% had children under the age of 18 living with them, 33.1% were married couples living together, 11.9% had a female householder with no husband present, and 50.9% were non-families. 38.4% of all households were made up of individuals, and 13.9% had someone living alone who was 65 years of age or older. The average household size was 2.08 and the average family size was 2.77.

In the city, the population was spread out, with 13.6% under the age of 18, 33.7% from 18 to 24, 20.9% from 25 to 44, 18.3% from 45 to 64, and 13.5% who were 65 years of age or older. The median age was 26.3 years. For every 100 females, there were 84.5 males. For every 100 females age 18 and over, there were 79.4 males.

The median income for a household in the city was $40,784, and the median income for a family was $48,090. Males had a median income of $38,314 versus $29,038 for females. The per capita income for the city was $19,651. About 5.0% of families and 8.9% of the population were below the poverty line, including 9.9% of those under age 18 and 9.8% of those age 65 or over.

== Education ==
Residents are within the Campbell County School District. Residents are zoned to Campbell County High School in Alexandria.

The Japanese Language School of Greater Cincinnati is a weekend supplementary Japanese school held at NKU. It was scheduled to move to NKU in July 1993.

== Sports ==
MLS Next Pro team FC Cincinnati 2 plays their home matches at NKU's soccer stadium.

As of 2025, the city hosts the Kentucky Barrels of Arena Football One, who will play their home games at NKU's Truist Arena.
