= Silver Grove School =

Location
- 101 W Third St; Silver Grove, KY 41805; United States
- Coordinates: 39.0343°N 84.3918°W

Information
- Type: Public
- Established: 1911
- Closed: 2019
- School district: Silver Grove Independent Schools
- Principal: Wes Murray (at closure)
- Grades: PK–12
- Enrollment: 211 (2018–19)
- Campus type: Small suburb
- Colors: Green & White
- Nickname: Big Trains/Lady Trains
- Website: Silver Grove School webpage

Silver Grove School was a pre-K–12 school located in the small city of Silver Grove, Kentucky, about 15 miles (24 km) southeast of Cincinnati in Campbell County, Kentucky. The school, which housed all grades in a single building, was located near the center of the city and operated by the Silver Grove Independent Schools district. The school sports teams had the unusual nickname of Big Trains (boys) and Lady Trains (girls), derived from the fact that the city and school were established in 1911 when the Chesapeake and Ohio Railway built a railyard in the community.

By the 2018–19 school year, the Silver Grove district, one of the state's smallest, was plagued by both low enrollment and low test scores. Recent graduating classes had been in single digits, and even after a significant increase in enrollment in that school year, the district had only slightly more than 200 students. The district's average ACT score for its juniors (11th grade) in the 2017–18 school year was 14.8 on the test's 36-point scale, with only one other high school in the state scoring lower. However, only seven students took the test in that year. At a February 2019 meeting of the Silver Grove school board at which a merger with the surrounding Campbell County Schools district was discussed, one parent noted that 87% of Silver Grove students were in households that met U.S. federal poverty guidelines. During this meeting, one board member suggested that the Silver Grove district close its high school component but continue to operate a K–8 school.

Later that month, the Silver Grove board voted to fully merge with the Campbell County district, which serves most of the county, (Note: While the Campbell County district serves most of the county's area, several communities within it operate "independent school districts", which in Kentucky refers specifically to a school district whose jurisdiction does not cover an entire county. Specifically, the cities of Bellevue, Dayton, Fort Thomas, and Newport operate K–12 systems, and the city of Southgate operates a K–8 school.) despite resistance from many students, parents, and teachers. Within a week, the Campbell County district's board voted to approve the merger, and the Silver Grove School held its final day of instruction on May 16, 2019, with the merger of the two districts officially taking effect on July 1.
