= Cold Spring, Kentucky =

- City
- Motto: "People Working Together"
- Location of Cold Spring in Campbell County, Kentucky.
- Coordinates: 39°00′47″N 84°26′05″W
- Country: United States
- State: Kentucky
- County: Campbell
- Established: 1941

Area
  - Total: 4.75 sq mi (12.30 km^{2})
  - Land: 4.75 sq mi (12.30 km^{2})
  - Water: 0 sq mi (0.00 km^{2})
- Elevation: 794 ft (242 m)

Population (2020)
  - Total: 6,216
  - Estimate (2024): 6,499
  - Density: 1,309.3/sq mi (505.52/km^{2})
- Time zone: UTC-5 (Eastern (EST))
  - Summer (DST): UTC-4 (EDT)
- ZIP code: 41076
- Area code: 859
- FIPS code: 21-16372
- GNIS feature ID: 2404094
- Website: coldspringky.gov

Cold Spring is a home rule-class city in Campbell County, Kentucky, in the United States. The population was 6,216 at the 2020 census. It is part of the Cincinnati-Northern Kentucky metropolitan area.

The organization Disabled American Veterans was formerly based in Cold Spring.

== Geography ==
Cold Spring is located in northern Campbell County. It is bordered to the northwest by Wilder, to the north by Highland Heights, to the northeast by Crestview, to the southeast by Alexandria, and to the southwest by the Licking River, with the city of Taylor Mill in Kenton County on the other side.

U.S. Route 27 passes through Cold Spring as Alexandria Pike, leading northwest 8 miles (13 km) to downtown Cincinnati and southeast 5 miles (8 km) to Alexandria. Kentucky Route 9, a limited-access highway, also passes through Cold Spring, leading northwest to Newport across the Ohio River from Cincinnati, and southeast to Maysville and beyond.

According to the United States Census Bureau, Cold Spring has a total area of 4.7 square miles (12.3 km^{2}), all land.

== History ==
The name "Cold Spring" refers to a cold stream which for many years served as the sole source of drinking water. The community was founded prior to 1800, and a post office was established in 1832. It has since merged with the post office of Highland Heights.

== Demographics ==
Historical population
| Census | Pop. | Note | %± |
|---|---|---|---|
| 1950 | 518 | | — |
| 1960 | 1,095 | | 111.4% |
| 1970 | 1,406 | | 28.4% |
| 1980 | 2,117 | | 50.6% |
| 1990 | 2,880 | | 36.0% |
| 2000 | 3,806 | | 32.2% |
| 2010 | 5,912 | | 55.3% |
| 2020 | 6,216 | | 5.1% |
| 2024 (est.) | 6,499 | | 4.6% |
U.S. Decennial Census

=== 2020 census ===
As of the 2020 census, Cold Spring had a population of 6,216. The median age was 49.6 years. 17.6% of residents were under the age of 18 and 28.5% of residents were 65 years of age or older. For every 100 females there were 88.9 males, and for every 100 females age 18 and over there were 85.4 males age 18 and over.

95.0% of residents lived in urban areas, while 5.0% lived in rural areas.

There were 2,757 households in Cold Spring, of which 20.9% had children under the age of 18 living in them. Of all households, 50.3% were married-couple households, 14.7% were households with a male householder and no spouse or partner present, and 30.7% were households with a female householder and no spouse or partner present. About 32.6% of all households were made up of individuals and 17.2% had someone living alone who was 65 years of age or older.

There were 2,850 housing units, of which 3.3% were vacant. The homeowner vacancy rate was 0.7% and the rental vacancy rate was 7.1%.

Racial composition as of the 2020 census
| Race | Number | Percent |
|---|---|---|
| White | 5,763 | 92.7% |
| Black or African American | 94 | 1.5% |
| American Indian and Alaska Native | 8 | 0.1% |
| Asian | 99 | 1.6% |
| Native Hawaiian and Other Pacific Islander | 1 | 0.0% |
| Some other race | 44 | 0.7% |
| Two or more races | 207 | 3.3% |
| Hispanic or Latino (of any race) | 67 | 1.1% |

=== 2000 census ===
As of the census of 2000, there were 3,806 people, 1,467 households, and 1,104 families residing in the city. The population density was 801.7 inhabitants per square mile (309.5/km^{2}). There were 1,507 housing units at an average density of 317.4 per square mile (122.5/km^{2}). The racial makeup of the city was 98.34% White, 0.42% African American, 0.21% Native American, 0.47% Asian, and 0.55% from two or more races. Hispanic or Latino of any race were 0.32% of the population.

There were 1,467 households, out of which 31.3% had children under the age of 18 living with them, 66.6% were married couples living together, 7.1% had a female householder with no husband present, and 24.7% were non-families. 22.8% of all households were made up of individuals, and 8.0% had someone living alone who was 65 years of age or older. The average household size was 2.59 and the average family size was 3.06.

In the city, the population was spread out, with 24.2% under the age of 18, 7.0% from 18 to 24, 26.8% from 25 to 44, 27.3% from 45 to 64, and 14.8% who were 65 years of age or older. The median age was 41 years. For every 100 females, there were 92.8 males. For every 100 females age 18 and over, there were 87.9 males.

The median income for a household in the city was $58,867, and the median income for a family was $68,125. Males had a median income of $46,875 versus $34,531 for females. The per capita income for the city was $24,451. About 1.0% of families and 1.2% of the population were below the poverty line, including 1.5% of those under age 18 and none of those age 65 or over.

== Education ==
Residents are within the Campbell County Schools. Residents are zoned to Campbell County High School in Alexandria.

Cold Spring has a public library, a branch of the Campbell County Public Library.
