= Crestview, Kentucky =

- City
- Location of Crestview in Campbell County, Kentucky.
- Coordinates: 39°01′29″N 84°24′56″W
- Country: United States
- State: Kentucky
- County: Campbell

Area
  - Total: 0.16 sq mi (0.41 km^{2})
  - Land: 0.16 sq mi (0.41 km^{2})
  - Water: 0 sq mi (0.00 km^{2})
- Elevation: 748 ft (228 m)

Population (2020)
  - Total: 452
  - Density: 2,853/sq mi (1,101.7/km^{2})
- Time zone: UTC-5 (Eastern (EST))
  - Summer (DST): UTC-4 (EDT)
- ZIP code: 41076
- Area code: 859
- FIPS code: 21-18424
- GNIS feature ID: 2404152
- Website: https://crestviewky.gov/

Crestview is a home rule-class city in Campbell County, Kentucky, in the United States. The population was 452 at the 2020 census.

== History ==
The city of Crestview was founded as Vet Village in 1948 by veterans of World War II. The first mayor, William Toner, was a veteran who – along with Michael Guidugli, Harold Shingshang, Edward Storer and Robert Munninghoff – broke ground as the first residents of the tiny city. Located less than 10 miles (16 km) from downtown Cincinnati, Ohio., this small piece of farmland quickly became a suburb for these young soldiers and their families. In 1950, the residents decide to rename the city through a contest, and the name Crestview was selected.

== Geography ==
Crestview is bordered to the west by Cold Spring.

According to the United States Census Bureau, the city has a total area of 0.2 square miles (0.4 km^{2}), all land.

== Demographics ==
Historical population
| Census | Pop. | Note | %± |
|---|---|---|---|
| 1960 | 616 | | — |
| 1970 | 659 | | 7.0% |
| 1980 | 528 | | −19.9% |
| 1990 | 356 | | −32.6% |
| 2000 | 471 | | 32.3% |
| 2010 | 475 | | 0.8% |
| 2020 | 452 | | −4.8% |
U.S. Decennial Census

As of the census of 2000, there were 471 people, 166 households, and 128 families residing in the city. The population density was 4,512.9 inhabitants per square mile (1,742.4/km^{2}). There were 167 housing units at an average density of 1,600.1 per square mile (617.8/km^{2}). The racial makeup of the city was 99.36% White and 0.64% Native American.

There were 166 households, out of which 39.2% had children under the age of 18 living with them, 66.3% were married couples living together, 11.4% had a female householder with no husband present, and 22.3% were non-families. 18.1% of all households were made up of individuals, and 9.6% had someone living alone who was 65 years of age or older. The average household size was 2.84 and the average family size was 3.24.

In the city, the population was spread out, with 26.8% under the age of 18, 7.2% from 18 to 24, 32.1% from 25 to 44, 20.6% from 45 to 64, and 13.4% who were 65 years of age or older. The median age was 35 years. For every 100 females, there were 102.1 males. For every 100 females age 18 and over, there were 92.7 males.

The median income for a household in the city was $48,750, and the median income for a family was $55,104. Males had a median income of $35,536 versus $30,893 for females. The per capita income for the city was $18,118. None of the families and 2.4% of the population were living below the poverty line, including no under eighteens and 5.3% of those over 64.

== Education ==
Residents are within the Campbell County Schools. Residents are zoned to Campbell County High School in Alexandria.
