= Sarah Pierce (disambiguation) =

Sarah Pierce (1767–1852), was an educator.

Sarah Pierce may refer to:

- Sarah Pierce, a character in the film Little Children, played by Kate Winslet
- Sarah Pierce, character in Private Practice, played by Juliette Goglia
- Sarah Meriwether Pierce, wife of Robert Lawson, officer from Virginia in the American Revolutionary War
