= David Leitch (disambiguation) =

David Leitch is an American actor, stuntman, and director.

David Leitch may also refer to:

- David Leitch (settler) (1753–1794), founder of Leitch's Station, Kentucky, United States
- David Leitch (politician) (1923–1988), Australian politician
- David R. Leitch (born 1948), American politician
