= Leitch's Station =

Settlement in Kentucky, USA

Leitch's Station was the first settlement in Campbell County, Kentucky, USA, now the City of Wilder, Kentucky on the Licking River. It was located six miles south of the mouth of the Licking and was named for Major David Leitch (1753–1794), who was given the land for his service in the American Revolutionary War. David Leitch served as Aide-de-Camp to General Lawson during the War. Leitch died at the age of 41. His young widow, Ketura Moss Leitch married General James Taylor Jr. The marriage united the two largest landowners in the area, who collectively owned most of what is now known as Newport, Bellevue, Southgate, Wilder, Fort Thomas, Highland Heights, Cold Run, and Alexandria.
