= Madame Zeno =

American aeronaut and entertainer

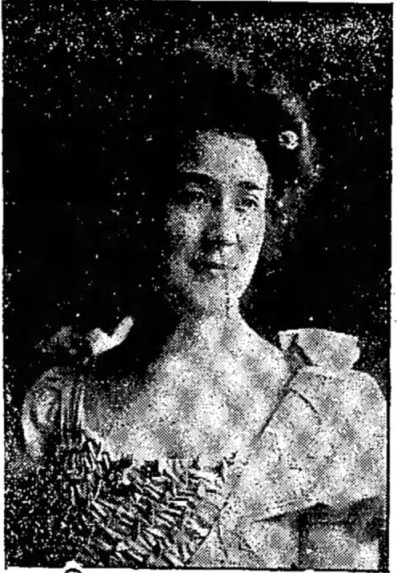
- Born: Lucy Alice Huonker; June 25, 1869; Blairsville, Pennsylvania, U.S.
- Died: May 22, 1964; Los Angeles, California, U.S.
- Other names: Alice Hunger; Alice Zeno; Alice Zeno Walter
- Occupation: Aeronaut
- Known for: Suspending from a trapezes below a Parachuting cut loose from a balloon.
- Spouse(s): John Hunter Whorter (1891); Peter Frank Walter (1903)
- Parent: 2

Madame Zeno (June 25, 1869 – April 22, 1964) was an early aeronaut, an actor, and an entertainer famous at the turn of the 20th century for her performance of suspending from a trapeze below a parachute attached to Hot Air Balloon and cutting loose from a balloon floating back to earth while hanging from the trapeze beneath the parachute.

== Early life ==
Lucy Alice Huonker (Americanized Hunger) was born 25 June 1869 in Blairsville, Pennsylvania. Lucy was the only child born to Martian A Huonker of Germany and Lucy Curry of Pennsylvania. Her parents did not marry, and Lucy was raised by her Grandmother Nancy Curry. Lucy made her first appearance in the News as a young girl. When she was just 15 Lucy and her friend Annie Miller hopped on a train, the Philadelphia Express, heading east along the tracks behind her grandma's house. The two runaways were reported, and a telegraph was sent ahead to the police in Johnstown, Pennsylvania where the two were taken into custody. Annie's father retrieved the two girls the following day.

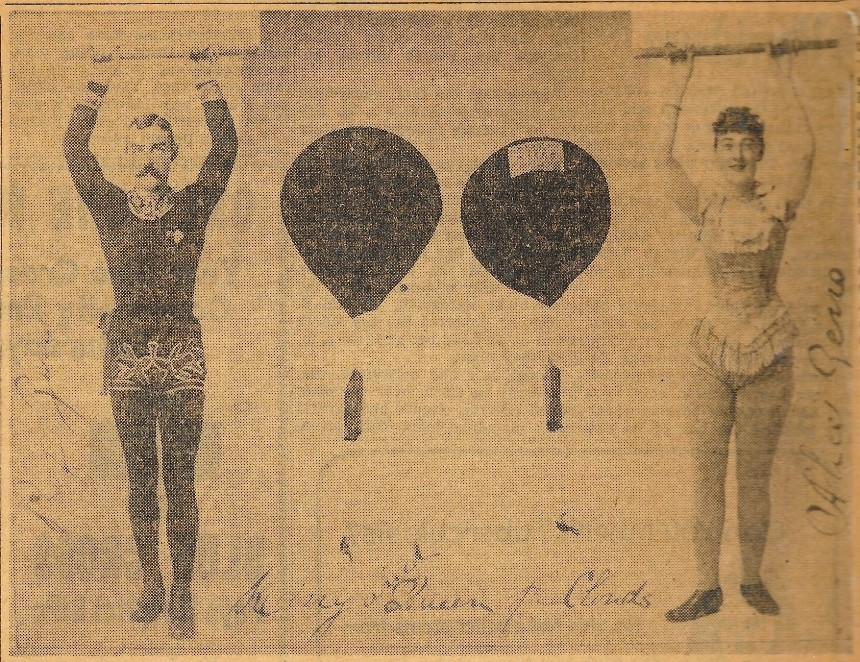
Copy of Photograph of Paul L Hague (Prof. Zeno) and Lucy Alice Huonker (Madame Zeno) from Jacktown fair c. 1893. Provided by the Mrs. Blanch T Burns family collection.

== Career ==
=== Introduction into balloon ascension ===
While visiting Cincinnati, Ohio in 1890 she attended a theater matinee about balloon ascension. After the show she approached the presenter, Professor Zeno, whose real name was Paul Hague, and insisted she could do that. After some discussion Professor Zeno offered her a job. The following day Professor Zeno gave his new understudy a pair of tights and showed her what to do. She made her first ascension at the Coney Island Amusement park near Cincinnati whose season was from June 12 to August 31. Lucy was 21 at the time of her first flight. Her second ascension was just across the Ohio River at Silver Grove, Kentucky owned by Harry Davis of Pittsburgh.

=== How it's done ===
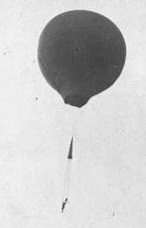
The whole contraption.

Lucy "Madame Zeno" would hang or sit on a trapeze that was attached to a parachute whose top was in turn attached to a hot air balloon. The balloon would be inflated from the hot air generated by a bonfire. When the balloon was full the ground crew would release the restraints and the entire contraption would head skyward. The balloons typical maximum altitude was between 3000 and 4000 feet. Once it reached this altitude and the noise of the world below had disappeared Madame Zeno would pull a rope that cut the parachute free from the balloon. The trapeze would drop a few hundred feet and the red, white, and blue parachute overhead would blossom bring her safely back to earth. While floating back to Earth Madame Zeno would wave to the crowd and perform various moves on the trapeze. Madame Zeno used no safety belts or lines to prevent injury should she fall from a height but relied solely on her strength and balance to stay firmly on the trapeze. She recalled making $500 on that first day, $400 for the ascension and another $100 for taking up an advertising banner and selling photos of her and the crew.

=== Headlining ===
After a season with Professor Zeno, she went on her own, maintaining the name Madame Zeno. She spent the next 18 years performing at Fairs and Amusement parks during Fourth of July and other celebrations across the nation during the summer. During the winter she worked as an actress in stage melodramas.

==== Some performances ====
- 1890 Between Jun 12 - Aug 31: First ascension at Coney Island, Ohio resort.
- 1890 Between Jun 12 - Aug 31: Second ascension across the Ohio River at Silver Grove Park, Kentucky.
- 1891 late Aug - Sept: Wenona Beach Resort, Michigan. Zeno teams with Alice Whorter "King and Queen of the Clouds"
- 1891 Oct 13 - 17: Ohio Humane Society Fair, Carthage Fairgrounds.
- 1893 Sep 4-8: West Virginia Exposition and State Fair, Wheeling, WV. (Cousin Willie Sayer goes up with Prof. Trainer)
- 1900 May 30: Oakwood Park, Pittsburgh, PA("Decoration Day”, Ropes twisted and stayed with balloon once)
- 1900 Jul 4: Schenley Park Pittsburgh, PA(Balloon catches fire.)
- 1900 Jul 7: Schenley Park Pittsburgh, PA
- 1900 Jul 13: Schenley Park Pittsburgh, PA
- 1900 Jul 20: Schenley Park Pittsburgh, PA
- 1900 Jul 27: Schenley Park Pittsburgh, PA
- 1900 Aug 3: Schenley Park Pittsburgh, PA
- 1900 Aug 10: Schenley Park Pittsburgh, PA
- 1900 Aug 31: Schenley Park Pittsburgh, PA
- 1900 Sep 8: Schenley Park Pittsburgh, PA(Race against Senorita Della, Labor Day, Rescued from tree after win)
- 1901 Jul 4: Schenley Park Pittsburgh, PA
- 1901 Jul: Lake Cohasset, Youngstown, OH (caught in a tree)
- 1901 Aug 6: Idora Park, Youngstown, OH
- 1901 Aug 14: Delphos, Ohio (The Red Men's Pow-Wow) Madam Zeno and John Knarr of Lima perform.
- 1901 Aug 29: Indiana, PA (15th Annual Indiana County Soldiers Association) Over 400 flights 1 Acdt 8 yrs ago Veterans Day
- 1901 Sep 12-13: Indiana, PA (45th Annual Indiana fair)
- 1902 May 30: Calhoun Park, PA – Memorial Day Amusements
- 1902 Jun 26: Canonsburg, PA - Centennial Anniversary
- 1902 Jul 4: Schenley Park, PA (President Teddy Roosevelt)
- 1902 Aug 28: Calhoun Park, PA
- 1902 Aug 29: Calhoun Park, PA
- 1903 Jun 17: Aliequippa Park, PA (12th annual Homestead Business Men's Picnic)
- 1909 Jul 4: Pittsburgh, PA (Returns to this city after an absence of 6 years.)
- 1909 Aug 19: Rock Point Park - Merchant & Manufacturers Picnic, Ellwood City, PA

=== Mr. President ===
4 July 1902 Schenley Park, Pennsylvania might have been one of the more memorable performances for Madame Zeno. President Theodore Roosevelt was on his way to his summer cottage at Oyster Bay, New York and stopped to deliver the Independence Day oration at Schenley Park. The President's train was composed of three cars in the first section of the Atlantic Express, East including his special car called the Olympia. Roosevelt was accompanied by Attorney General Knox, Secretary Cortelyou, the President's physician Dr. John F Urie, James Creelman of the New York “Journal”, executive stenographer Mr. Latta, and six secret service men. Billed at the time as the “Greatest Fourth of July that Pittsburgh has ever know” with the parade seen by an estimated 600,000 people. Just before the band played “Hail to the Chief” Madame Zeno's balloon soared towards the sky until she seemed just a speck dangling below the balloon. The crowd grew silent, and she cut loose from the balloon. Within a few second the parachute blossomed, and a ripple of applause welcomed her as she floated toward the earth just in time for the band to begin playing for the President. After the show President Teddy Roosevelt pinned a medal on her. The President gave his address surrounded by more than 100,000 men, women, and children at the foot of Flagstaff Hill. By midnight more than 750,000 people had visited Schenley Park with no serious accidents to mar the festivities.

=== Close call ===
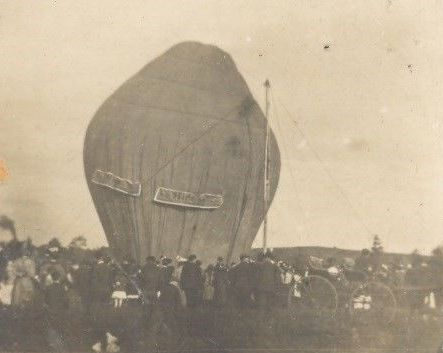
Filling the balloon.

The occasional alighting in a tree was the most common hazard for the parachuting balloonist but on one occasion she experienced an explosion. The bonfire used to fill the balloon with hot air was made using 5 gallons of kerosene and eight or ten oak barrels. At Aliequippa Park on 17 June 1903 the bonfire used in the balloon ascension prematurely exploded resulting in the injury of Madame Zeno. She was severely burned about the limbs and body. The explosion was caused by the fact that the oil man sent her gasoline instead of carbon oil and this exploded.

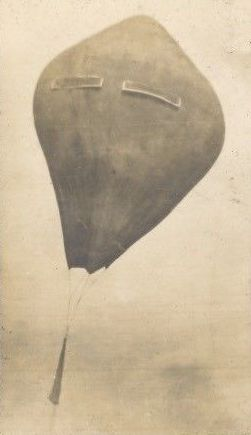
Going up.

== Final performance and retirement ==
20 August 1909, Rock Point Park in Ellwood, Pennsylvania:

With a crowd of about 8,000 Madam Zeno began her final ascent. Her helper, 17-year-old Michael Frances Conroy, was suffering a compound fracture of the arm due to a fall of 70 feet the prior week in Freeport, Long Island. It took 100 or more men to hold the balloon down as local Davy Ball manned the fire to fill the envelope before Madame Zeno ordered the balloon to be released. Upon reaching about 1,000 feet she hung by her knees and waved to the crowd below. Once she reached 4,000 feet the wind carried her across the Connoquenessing Creek and almost two miles from the park before Madame Zeno cut loose. She landed in a wet ravine and was up to her waist in water and scratched by the thick briers. Farmer Robert Ramsey assisted her in getting out of the marsh. She told the reporter that was the most dangerous ascent she had ever made due to the deep ravines and craggy hillsides of the surroundings. She did wear a life-preserver on her waist in case of landing in the water, as her friend and teacher had drowned after landing in water. At the age of 30 and weight of 152 pounds she felt it was time to retire. She returned to Pittsburgh and her helper Frances Conroy returned to Newark, New Jersey.

After the death of her second husband, she moved to California trying her hand at acting in Hollywood but found she did not like it. She settled in Long Beach, California and worked as a hotel manager.

On her 90th birthday 25 June 1959 Mrs. Alice Zeno Walter took her first airplane ride courtesy of a former neighbor Robert Dilday, his son Burr, and Aircraft Associates head of the flying school Spud Martin. Chief pilot Chuck Berns took Madame Zeno up in a twin engine Piper Apache for a 30-minute aerial tour of the Long Beach waterfront, the Marina and Disneyland. When they returned to the flight line Zeno was presented a bouquet of roses and a birthday cake. She was asked if she would like to learn to fly and she responded she was too old but wondered if they would let her do a parachute jump out of an airplane.

== Family ==
Madame Zeno married twice, first to fellow balloon aeronaut John Hunter Whorter, stage name Professor Trainer, 4 August 1891 in Essex, Canada. Her second marriage 15 July 1903 was to entertainer Peter "Pete" Frank Walter, stage name Pete F Baker, in Ontario, Canada. Pete was a member of "Baker and Farron" and famous for his black face acts including Aunt Jemima. She had no children and after the death of her second husband sometime after 1915 she moved to California in 1918 and eventually settled in Long Beach where she remained until her death in 1964.

== Death ==
Alice Zeno Walter died 22 May 1964 after two days in Long Beach General Hospital with Bronchopneumonia. She was 94 years old. Her body was donated to the USC School of Medicine 26 May 1964.
