= St. John the Baptist Roman Catholic Church (Wilder, Kentucky) =

Historic church in Kentucky, United States

- U.S. National Register of Historic Places
- U.S. Historic district
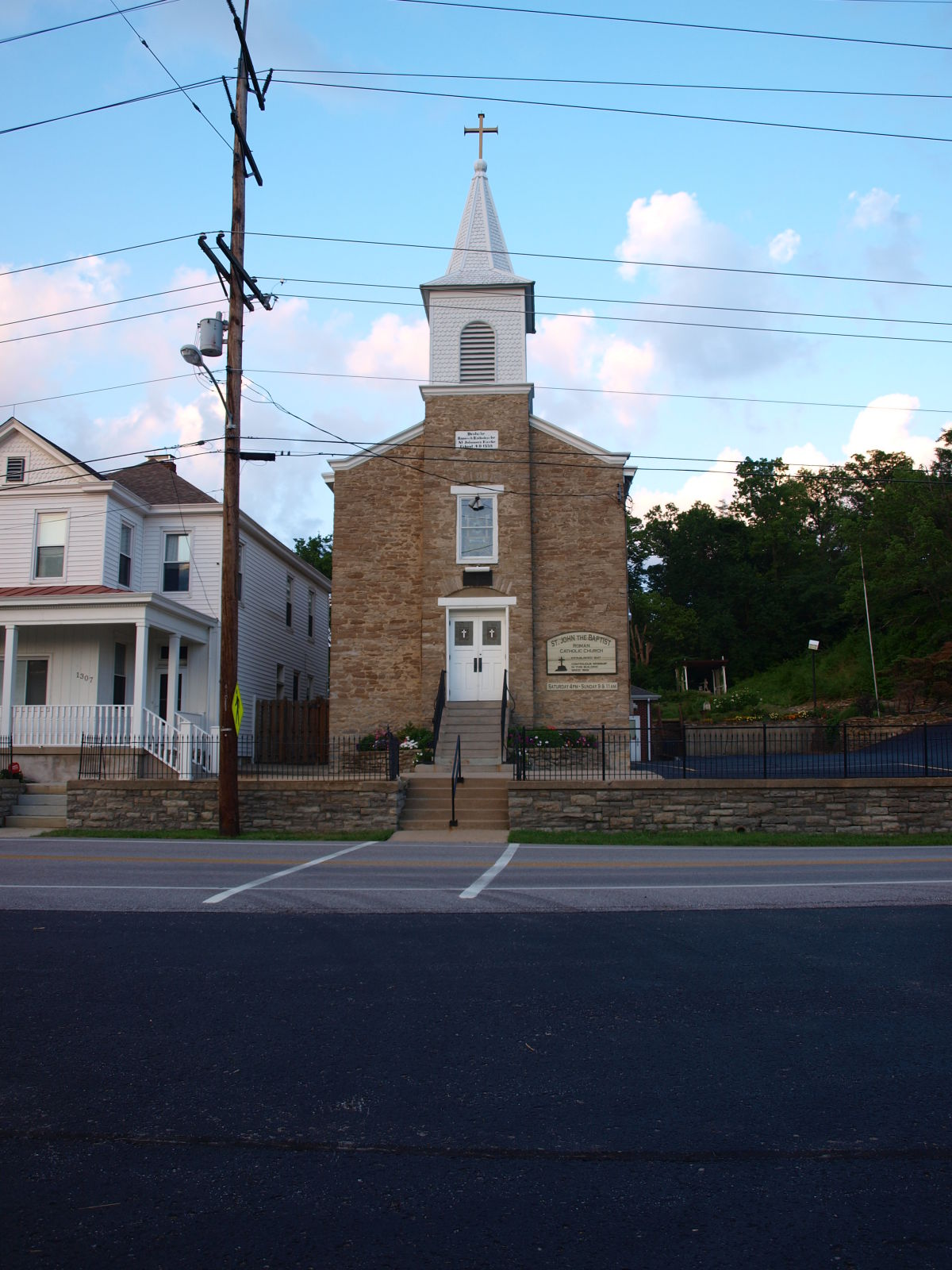

- Location within Kentucky Location within the United States
- Location: 1307 Johns Hill Rd., Wilder, Kentucky
- Coordinates: 39.046700°N 84.485190°W
- Built: 1858
- Architectural style: Georgian Revival
- NRHP reference No.: 80001495
- Added to NRHP: August 11, 1980

The St. John the Baptist Roman Catholic Church in Wilder, Kentucky is located at 1307 John's Hill Road near Northern Kentucky University. It was listed on the National Register of Historic Places in 1980.

A stone church was built on the present site in 1858. The parish was begun by nine German immigrant families, 11 years earlier in 1847. The first church was a log cabin structure built on the top of John's Hill Rd.

The present site is in Campbell County, Kentucky overlooking the Licking River. During the American Civil War the site was used as part of the defense of Cincinnati, Ohio.
