= Professor Zeno (Paul L Hague) =

American aeronaut and stuntman

- Born: Paul Leslie Hauge; August 1, 1875; St. Clairsville, Ohio, U.S.
- Died: September 26, 1901; Lima, Ohio, U.S.
- Cause of death: Drowning
- Resting place: Woodlawn Cemetery, Lima, Ohio, U.S.
- Occupation: Aeronaut
- Known for: Suspending from a trapezes below a Parachuting cut loose from a balloon.
- Spouse: Mable Overholt (Myrtal Brandon)

Professor Zeno (August 1, 1875 – September 26, 1901) was an early Aeronaut at the turn of the 20th century known for his performance of suspending from a trapeze below a parachute attached to a Hot Air Balloon, which he would then and cut loose from to float back to Earth while hanging from the trapeze beneath the parachute. He also performed the balloon cannon act in which he, again equipped with a parachute, was shot from a cannon suspended from a hot air balloon only to float safely back to Earth.

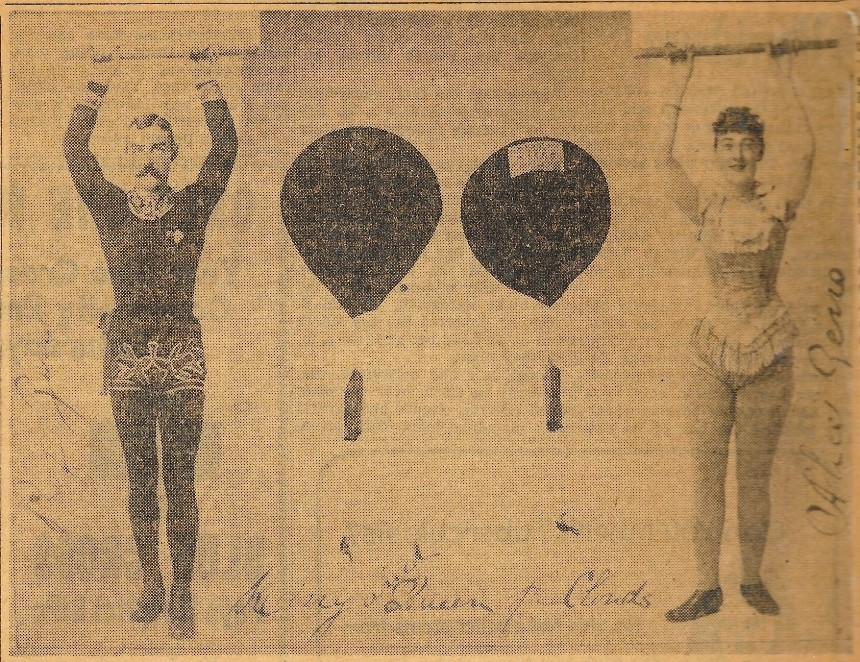
Copy of Photograph of Paul L Hague (Prof. Zeno) and Lucy Alice Huonker (Madame Zeno) from Jacktown fair circa 1893. Provided by the Mrs Blanch T Burns family collection.

== Early years ==
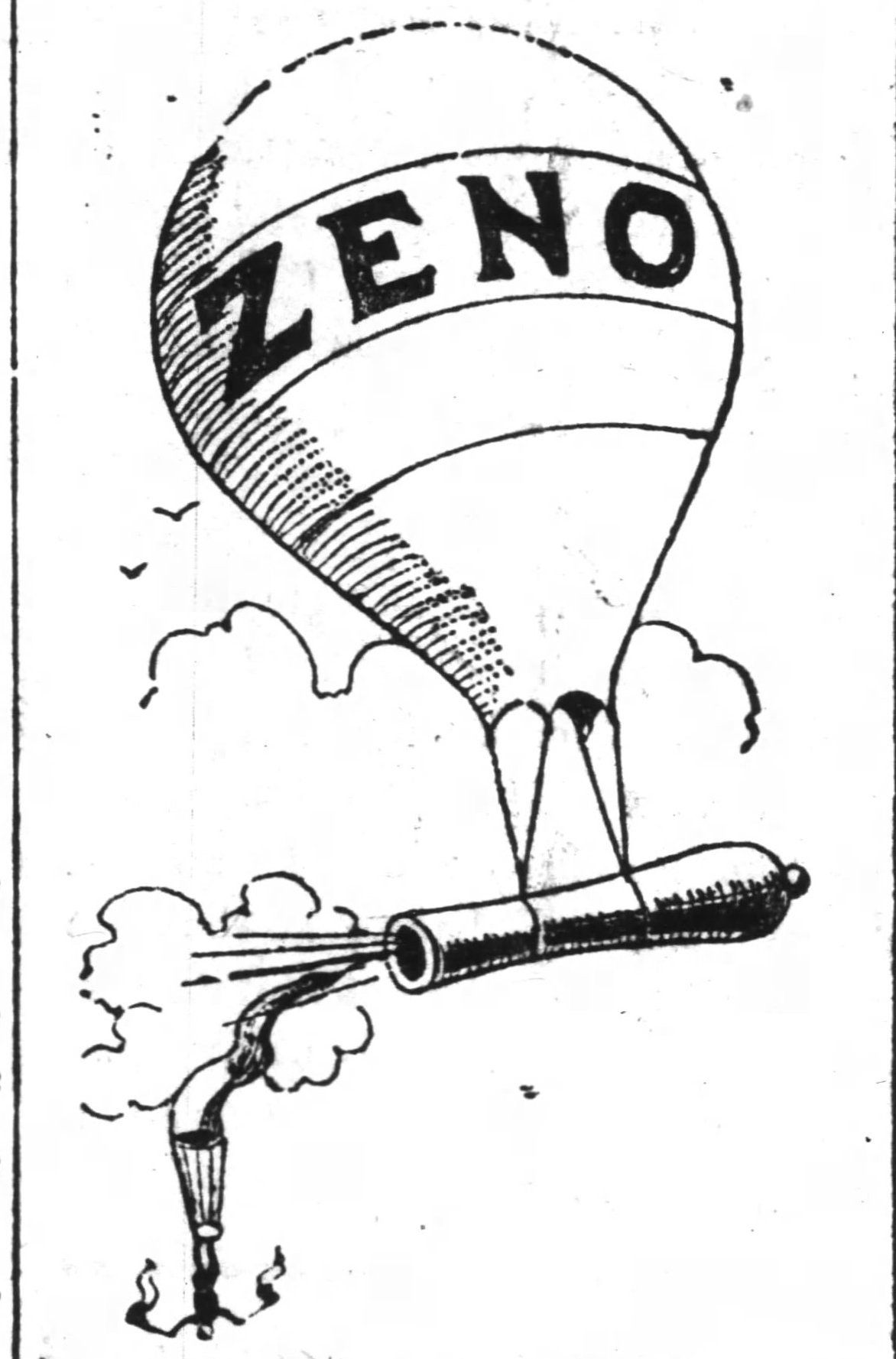
Advertisement image of Professor Zeno performing the Balloon Cannon act.

Paul Leslie Hague was born in St. Clairsville just east of Wheeling, Ohio, and was the only child of John R Hague and his first wife Martha E Hilliges. At an early age Paul joined the circus and performed trapeze acts and balloon ascensions. He performed with several companies as well as partnering with various performers during his carriers such as O'Brian's Balloon and Trapeze show, Stowe's Circus, American Balloon Company, Charles Collins, Professor Knarr, Charles M Hawley, Mabel Brandon, Mile. Hortennse and his former protégé Alice Whorter (Madame Zeno). He married Mabel M Overholt of Canada a.k.a. Myrtle Brandon in Springfield, Ohio.

== Some performances ==
- 1887 Sep 3: Little Rock, Arkansas - O'Brien's Balloon and Trapeze show.
- 1888 Feb 4: Colfax, Ohio - American Balloon Company.
- 1889 Jan 6: Colfax, Ohio.
- 1890 Dec 23: Vidalia, Louisiana - Stowe's Circus.(landed in river and rescued by skiff)
- 1891 Jun 21: Cincinnati, Ohio - Woodsdale Island Park.(Balloon caught fire)
- 1891 Jul 4: Silver Grove Park, Kentucky.(with Mile Hortennse)
- 1891 Aug - Sept: Wenona Beach Resort, Michigan.(With Madame Alice Zeno)
- 1891 Oct 13 - 17: Cincinnati, Ohio - Humane Society Horse Fair.(Zeno and his (1st?) wife)
- 1894 Jul 25: Chattanooga, Tennessee.
- 1894 Oct 16 - 19: Sumter, South Carolina - Bicycle Park
- 1894 Sep 25 - 27: Concord, North Carolina
- 1898 Jun 5: Paducah, Kentucky - La Belle Park.
- 1899 Sep 30: Albuquerque, New Mexico.(Partner Charles Collins breaks back and dies)
- 1901 Jun 22: Springfield, Ohio - fairgrounds.(New wife broke both legs)
- 1901 Jul 14: Springfield, Ohio - Island Park.
- 1901 Sep 26: Lima, Ohio.(Drowns in City Reservoir)

== Death and burial ==
26 September 1901, State Fair, Lima, Ohio

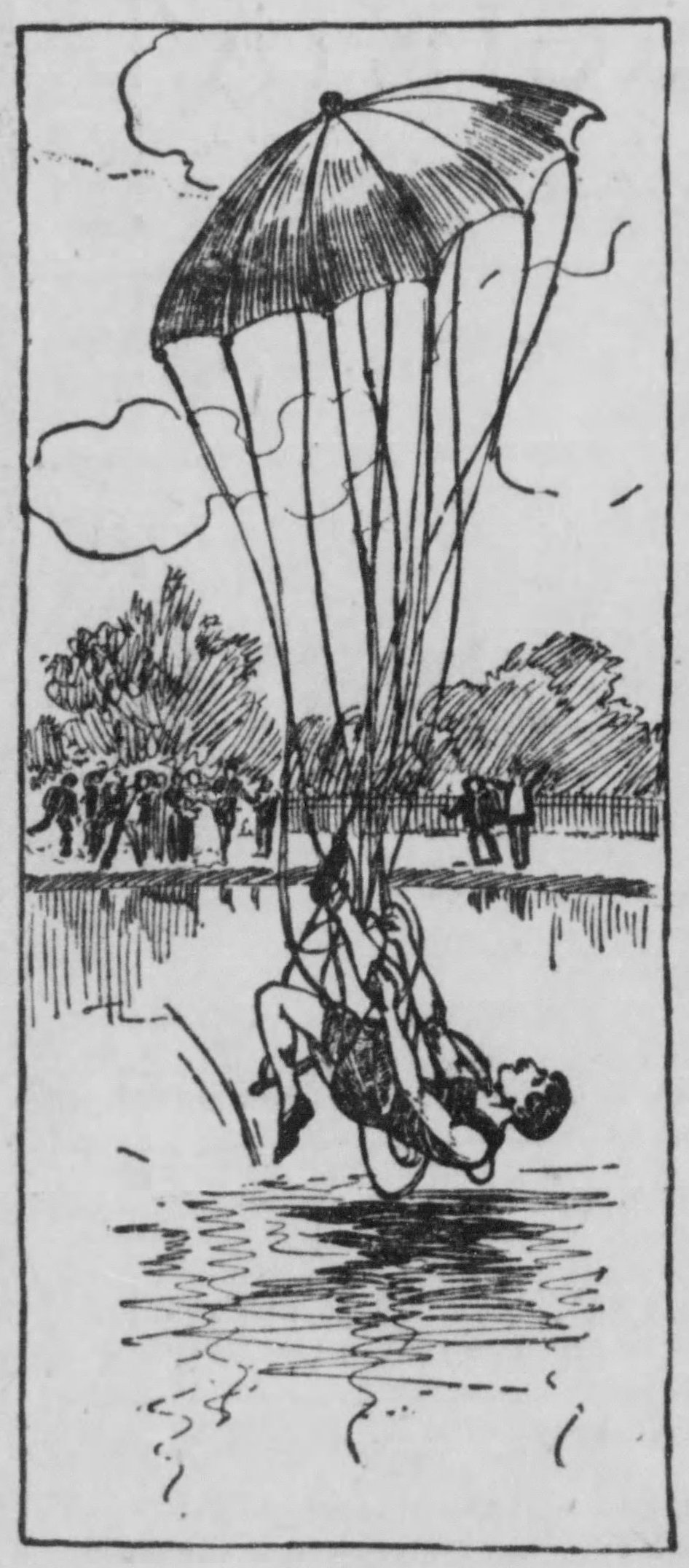
Image of Professor Zeno tangled in his parachute lines landing in water.

Touted as “The most successful Allen County fair ever held” the fair was marred by tragedy between 3:30 and 4:00 pm. While under the direction of Lima's own Professor John Knarr, a well known aeronaut originally from Wapakoneta, Professor Zeno and Charles M Hawley performed a balloon race. Hawley had been unable to cut loose and landed in a yard along High Street east of the city water works. Zeno had dropped beyond the tree line and when about 100 feet above the ground, seeing he would land in the reservoir, began calling for someone to save him. He landed in the center of the reservoir and the large canvas parachuted settled onto him as he became entangled in the ropes. Hawley was told of the incident and ran to assist jumping into the water but was unable to reach Zeno. The reservoir, by this time, was surrounded by hundreds of spectators. Hawley and several of the men and boys there constructed a crude raft out of boards and used it to reach the parachute dragging it to shore. They freed Zeno from the ropes and attempted to resuscitate him without success. An ambulance was called and took the body to the morgue where hundreds of people flocked throughout the evening to get a glimpse of the fallen man. Coroner Burton sent telegrams to his father in Savannah, Georgia and his wife, whom was in a Springfield hospital with two broken legs sustained in an ascensions accident there June 22. His father and wife expressed he should be laid to rest there in Lima and his wife would notify his aunt. Paul Hogue had been married twice, his second only a few weeks.

On the afternoon of 30 September 1901 the body of Paul Hague was laid to rest in Woodlawn Cemetery. Mr John Knarr paid for the preparation of the body and viewing room for the widow to mourn. The widow arrived in Lima by train and insisted she must return on the next train but at the persistence of Mr Knarr attended the afternoon funeral before leaving to pack up her belongings and go back to Canada, where she was from. The widow exhibited “cold, calm indifference that showed plainly her true feelings in the matter” according to Mr Knarr. The Lima Fair Board paid for a plot in the local cemetery for the burial.
