= Japanese Language School of Greater Cincinnati =

- シンシナティ日本語補習校

Location
- MP-102, Northern Kentucky University; Highland Heights, Campbell County, Kentucky 41099; 39°01′48″N 84°27′45″W

Information
- Established: 1979; 47 years ago
- Website: jls-cincinnati.edu

Japanese Language School of Greater Cincinnati (シンシナティ日本語補習校, Shinshinati Nihongo Hoshūkō) is a Japanese supplementary school with classes held at Northern Kentucky University (NKU) in Highland Heights, Kentucky, in the Cincinnati metropolitan area.

Classes are held at the Mathematics, Education and Psychology Center (MP), formerly known as the Business Education Psychology (BEP) Building.

== History ==
It was established in October 1975, with an initial enrollment of 30. Its initial classroom location was Mount Auburn Church in Cincinnati. In June 1984, it began holding classes at the University of Cincinnati (UC).

In 1990 the school had an enrollment of 190 and 15 teachers, and held classes in fourteen rooms in Swift Hall in the University of Cincinnati. In 1990 parents, many of them not drawing a salary, made up the majority of the teachers.

In June 1993 its enrollment was up to 250, and it had some students from Dayton, Ohio. On July 1, 1993, it was scheduled to move to NKU. In September 1993 it had around 230 students and 19 members of the faculty. The majority of the former were children of workers at companies on temporary visas. UC and NKU students made up about 50% of the latter.

In 1995 enrollment was about 200.

== Curriculum ==
In 1990 the curriculum included the Japanese language, social studies, and mathematics. In addition to the academic component, the school exists to reinforce to the students how Japanese etiquette and cultural behavior work, so they are not Americanized to the point where they do not behave properly in Japanese society.

== See also ==
- Japanese language education in the United States
