= David Leitch (settler) =

Founder of Leitch's station, Kentucky

David Leitch (September 11, 1753 – November 9, 1794) was the founder of Leitch's Station, Kentucky, United States.

Leitch was born in Glasgow, Scotland. At an early age he and his older brother James immigrated to Virginia. He served in the American Revolutionary War, where he attained the rank of major.

In 1789, Leitch traveled to Fort Pitt (Pittsburgh) hoping to recruit settlers interested in exploring the Kentucky region. Upon acquiring a raft and supplies, Leitch found 20 hearty souls who agreed to accompany him. When the party arrived at Losantiville (Cincinnati), they encountered many hostile natives, so they traveled up the Licking River for about six miles. There, they dismantled the raft and built a blockhouse with a high picket fence and established Leitch's Station. In December 1790, Leitch traveled to Bryan's Station, near Lexington, where he met and married Keturah Moss. Leitch was sent as a delegate to Kentucky's first Constitutional Convention, at Danville, Kentucky in 1784.

David Leitch of Kilmardinny (near Glasgow) in Scotland Sep 11 A.D. 1753. At an early age he migrated to America with an older brother (Andrew) and settled at Richmond, Virginia. A brave and patriotic republican. While quite young he took part in the struggle for American independence as an aide de-camp to General Lawson. In the year 1785 he came to Kentucky and settled near Lexington subsequently he came to his estate on the Licking River near Newport called Leitch's Station. There he erected himself a block-house to protect himself and his associates against the Indians at which place he died Nov 7th A.D. 1794. He was also a member of the first convention of Kentucky.

David was the youngest of 5 sons, and six daughters, born to David Leitch of Kilmardinny, and Jean Bryson of Craigallan. David was the brother of Major Andrew Leitch, 3rd Virginia Regiment, who died shortly after the Battle of Harlem (d. 10.1.1776) on 9.16.1776. The eldest brother, John Leitch, was the senior partner in Leitch & Smith, the West Indies trading company.

In 1789, Leitch traveled to Fort Pitt (Pittsburgh) hoping to recruit settlers interested in exploring the Kentucky region. Upon acquiring a raft and supplies, Leitch found 20 hearty souls who agreed to accompany him. When the party arrived at Losantiville (Cincinnati), they encountered many hostile natives, so they traveled up the Licking River for about six miles. There, they dismantled the raft and built a blockhouse with a high picket fence and established Leitch's Station. In December 1790, Leitch traveled to Bryan's Station, near Lexington, where he met and married Keturah Moss. Leitch was sent as a delegate to Kentucky's first Constitutional Convention, at Danville, Kentucky in 1784.

Leitch served in the American army during the Revolutionary War, where he attained the rank of major. Even though there is no record that he was given a land grant, he did purchase considerable acreage in Campbell, Kenton, Pendleton, Lincoln, Fleming and Bath counties. Most of these investments were made in partnership with Joseph Weiseger and John Fowler.

When the partnership holdings were distributed among the owners, David received about 33,800 acres of land in Campbell County, consisting of most of what is known today as Wilder, Highland Heights, Cold Spring, Alexandria, Grant's Lick and much of southern Kenton County.

Major Leitch owned 2/3 of 13,800 acres of the north-east side of the Licking river.

The town of Leitchfield, the county seat in Grayson County, KY, was named in honour of David.

On his deathbed, Leitch called in his lawyer and dictated his last will and testament, in which he left all of his holdings to his wife, Keturah.

Keturah and David did not have any children. David was buried in the yard of the Leitch home. However, many years later in May 1853, Keturah had his body moved to the Evergreen Cemetery in Southgate, Kentucky.

Keturah had a monument erected with the following inscription:

In Memory of Major David Leitch.
Who was universally beloved
For his
Benevolence, generosity
And many virtues
This monument erected
By his devoted wife
May 1853

On the north side of the monument is this inscription:

Major David Leitch. Who was born at Glasgow in Scotland
Sep 11 A.D. 1753. At an early age he migrated
to America with an older brother and
settled at Richmond, Virginia. A brave
and patriotic republican. While quite young
he took part in the struggle for American
independence as an aide de-camp to General Lawson.
In the year 1785 he came to
Kentucky and settled near Lexington
subsequently he came to his estate
on the Licking River near Newport
called Leitch's Station. There he
erected himself a block-house to protect
himself and his associates against
the Indians at which place he died
November 7th A.D. 1794. He was also a member
of the first convention of Kentucky.
