= Campbell County High School (Kentucky) =

Public school in Kentucky, United States

Location
- 909 Camel Crossing; Alexandria, Kentucky; United States; 38.91912°N 84.39362°W

Information
- Type: Public
- Motto: Camel Pride: Be Respectful, Be Responsible, and Be Safe.
- School district: Campbell County Schools
- Principal: Holly Phelps
- Teaching staff: 83.00 (on FTE basis)
- Grades: 9 to 12
- Enrollment: 1,539 (2023–2024)
- Student to teacher ratio: 18.54
- Colors: Purple, gold and white
- Sports: Sanctioned KHSAA sport
- Mascot: Camel
- Nickname: Fighting Camels
- Team name: Camels
- Website: CCHS website

Campbell County High School (CCHS) is a public high school located in Alexandria, Kentucky, United States. It is the only high school in the Campbell County School District and their nickname is the "Fighting Camels." The district also includes Campbell County Middle School and the district's five elementary schools: Crossroads Elementary, Campbell Ridge Elementary, Reiley Elementary, Cline Elementary, and Grant's Lick Elementary. The school has several sports programs, including baseball, basketball, and football and soccer as well as a band program, the Band of Pride.

CCHS also has wrestling and track and field teams, producing numerous state finishers in their history. Including back to back state champion wrestling teams in 1990–91 and a top 25 national ranking in 1991. In 2010 the girls track program won their first team state championship in class 3A.

It serves portions of Campbell County, including Alexandria, California, Claryville, Cold Spring, Crestview, Highland Heights, Mentor, and Wilder.

== Notable alumni ==
- Herschel Turner, former American football professional tackle and guard
- B. J. Whitmer, American professional wrestler
- Glenn Withrow, American actor, director, producer and writer
