= Silver Grove Independent Schools =

Defunct school district in Kentucky

Silver Grove Independent Schools was a school district located in Silver Grove, a small community in Campbell County, Kentucky. The area served by the school district included the town of Silver Grove and environs. The school, which had grades from pre-kindergarten through 12 in a single building, used "Big Trains" as its athletic nickname, stemming from the city's and school district's founding in 1911 when the Chesapeake and Ohio Railway built a railyard in the community. The local station has since been remodeled into a drywall plant.

In the 2017–18 school year, the district had 172 students. In February 2019 the district had slightly over 200 students, with one source citing 215 and another 211. That month the district voted to merge into the surrounding Campbell County Schools district, and the county board voted to accept the merger. The district held its final day of instruction on May 16, 2019, formally merging with the Campbell County district on July 1 of that year.

== Schools ==
- Silver Grove School
