= Campbell County Schools =

School district in Kentucky, United States

Campbell County Schools is a school district operating schools in Campbell County, Kentucky in Greater Cincinnati. Its headquarters are in Alexandria.

It serves portions of the county, including Alexandria, California, Claryville, Cold Spring, Crestview, Highland Heights, Mentor, and Wilder.

In 2019, the county board of education voted to accept the merger with Silver Grove Independent Schools. The merger was effective July 1, 2019.

== Schools ==
Secondary schools:

- Campbell County High School
- Campbell County Middle School

Elementary schools:

- Campbell Ridge Elementary
- Donald E. Cline Elementary
- Grant's Lick Elementary
- Crossroads Elementary
- John W. Reiley Elementary

Alternative:

- Campbell County Central/Day Treatment
