= Claryville, Kentucky =

Census-designated place in Kentucky, United States

- Census-designated place
- Location in Campbell County and the state of Kentucky.
- Coordinates: 38°54′50″N 84°24′34″W
- Country: United States
- State: Kentucky
- County: Campbell

Area
  - Total: 7.20 sq mi (18.65 km^{2})
  - Land: 7.20 sq mi (18.65 km^{2})
  - Water: 0 sq mi (0.00 km^{2})
- Elevation: 735 ft (224 m)

Population (2020)
  - Total: 2,992
  - Density: 415.5/sq mi (160.43/km^{2})
- Time zone: UTC-5 (Eastern (EST))
  - Summer (DST): UTC-4 (EDT)
- ZIP code: 41001
- Area code: 859
- FIPS code: 21-15166
- GNIS feature ID: 2402781

Claryville is an unincorporated community and census-designated place (CDP) in Campbell County, Kentucky, United States. The population was 2,992 at the 2020 census.

== History ==
Claryville was named for the Clary family of pioneer settlers. W T Clary was the postmaster of Claryville Post Office. Previously, the area was known as Pond Creek and the Post Office was Pond Creek Post Office.

== Geography ==
Claryville is located in southwestern Campbell County. Its western border, Pond Creek Road, runs along the Licking River, which forms the Kenton County line. U.S. Route 27 (Alexandria Pike) is a four-lane highway that passes through the eastern part of Claryville, leading north through Alexandria 16 miles (26 km) to downtown Cincinnati, Ohio, and south 19 miles (31 km) to Falmouth.

According to the United States Census Bureau, the CDP has a total area of 6.9 square miles (18.0 km^{2}), all land.

== Demographics ==
Historical population
Census	Pop.	Note	%±
2020	2,992		—
U.S. Decennial Census

=== 2020 census ===
As of the 2020 census, Claryville had a population of 2,992. The median age was 41.5 years. 24.2% of residents were under the age of 18 and 18.5% of residents were 65 years of age or older. For every 100 females there were 98.5 males, and for every 100 females age 18 and over there were 93.3 males age 18 and over.

42.6% of residents lived in urban areas, while 57.4% lived in rural areas.

There were 1,128 households in Claryville, of which 33.2% had children under the age of 18 living in them. Of all households, 57.6% were married-couple households, 13.0% were households with a male householder and no spouse or partner present, and 21.4% were households with a female householder and no spouse or partner present. About 17.5% of all households were made up of individuals and 10.1% had someone living alone who was 65 years of age or older.

There were 1,177 housing units, of which 4.2% were vacant. The homeowner vacancy rate was 1.5% and the rental vacancy rate was 3.2%.

Racial composition as of the 2020 census
Race	Number	Percent
White	2,771	92.6%
Black or African American	28	0.9%
American Indian and Alaska Native	2	0.1%
Asian	16	0.5%
Native Hawaiian and Other Pacific Islander	1	0.0%
Some other race	28	0.9%
Two or more races	146	4.9%
Hispanic or Latino (of any race)	38	1.3%

=== 2000 census ===
As of the census of 2000, there were 2,588 people, 942 households, and 725 families residing in the CDP. The population density was 371.1 inhabitants per square mile (143.3/km^{2}). There were 993 housing units at an average density of 142.4 per square mile (55.0/km^{2}). The racial makeup of the CDP was 99.11% White, 0.27% African American, 0.12% Native American, 0.12% Asian, 0.08% from other races, and 0.31% from two or more races. Hispanic or Latino of any race were 0.46% of the population.

There were 942 households, out of which 38.2% had children under the age of 18 living with them, 63.4% were married couples living together, 9.4% had a female householder with no husband present, and 23.0% were non-families. 18.8% of all households were made up of individuals, and 4.7% had someone living alone who was 65 years of age or older. The average household size was 2.75 and the average family size was 3.14.

In the CDP, the population was spread out, with 26.2% under the age of 18, 11.1% from 18 to 24, 30.4% from 25 to 44, 23.6% from 45 to 64, and 8.7% who were 65 years of age or older. The median age was 35 years. For every 100 females, there were 100.2 males. For every 100 females age 18 and over, there were 97.0 males.

The median income for a household in the CDP was $49,231, and the median income for a family was $52,083. Males had a median income of $39,150 versus $27,500 for females. The per capita income for the CDP was $21,367. About 3.7% of families and 4.6% of the population were below the poverty line, including 4.8% of those under age 18 and none of those age 65 or over.

== Education ==
Residents are within the Campbell County School District. Residents are zoned to Campbell County High School in Claryville, Kentucky
