= Silver Grove, Kentucky =

- City
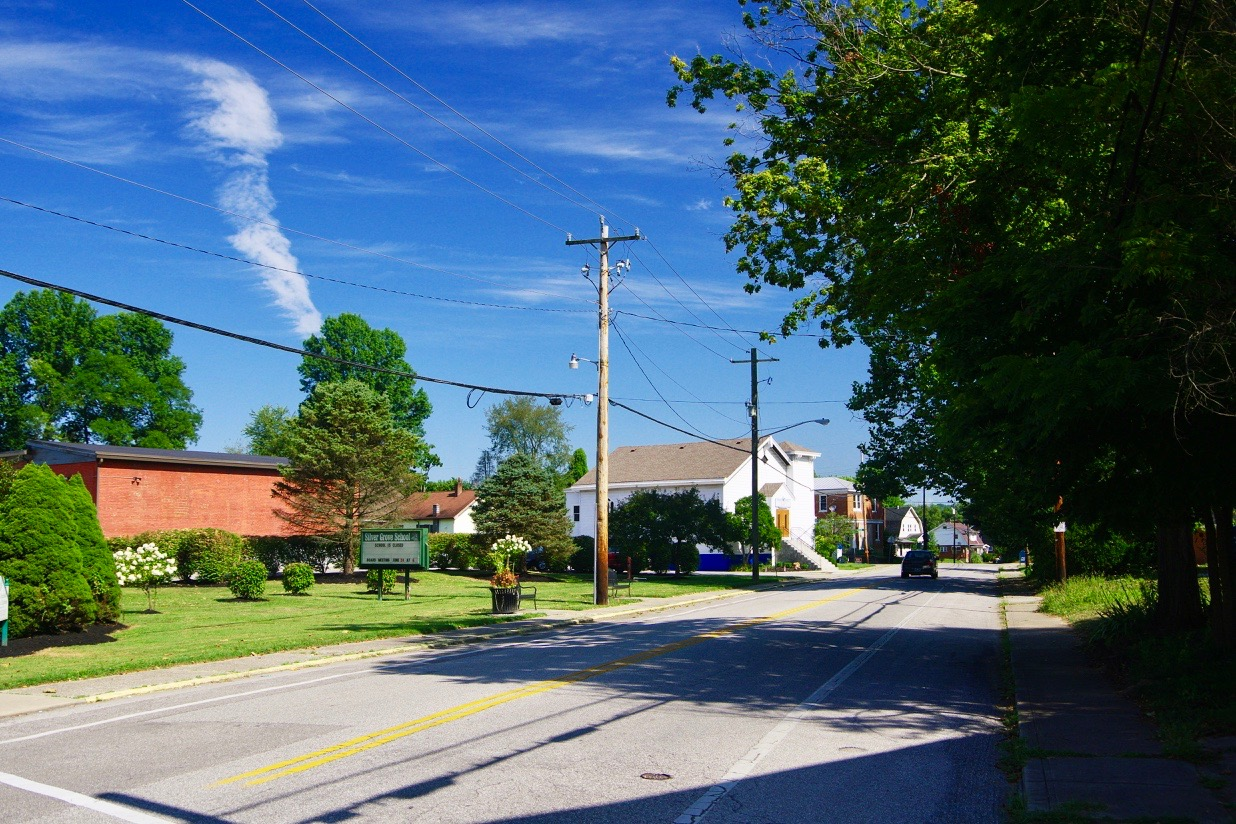
- Four Mile Pike (KY 547)

- Location of Silver Grove in Campbell County, Kentucky.
- Coordinates: 39°02′25″N 84°23′55″W
- Country: United States
- State: Kentucky
- County: Campbell
- Incorporation: December 29, 1950

Government
  - Type: Mayor-Council
  - Mayor: Neal Bedel (R)

Area
  - Total: 1.64 sq mi (4.25 km^{2})
  - Land: 1.13 sq mi (2.93 km^{2})
  - Water: 0.51 sq mi (1.32 km^{2})
- Elevation: 495 ft (151 m)

Population (2020)
  - Total: 1,154
  - Density: 1,020.8/sq mi (394.13/km^{2})
- Time zone: UTC-5 (Eastern (EST))
  - Summer (DST): UTC-4 (EDT)
- ZIP code: 41085
- Area code: 859
- FIPS code: 21-70644
- GNIS feature ID: 2405465
- Website: cityofsilvergroveky.com

Silver Grove is a home rule-class city along the Ohio River in Campbell County, Kentucky, in the United States. The population was 1,154 at the 2020 census.

== History ==
Silver Grove is a railroad town founded in 1911 for the Chesapeake and Ohio Railway. In 1914, a newspaper described it as a modern town, because it boasted electric lights, an urban water and sewer system, a modernized fire department, a school, and a spacious park. In 1948, C&O wanted out of the city. In 1951, Gerald Losey was selected as the first mayor.

== Geography ==
Silver Grove is located in northeastern Campbell County on the south bank of the Ohio River. Kentucky Route 8 passes through the city, leading northwest (downstream) along the river 8 miles (13 km) to Dayton and southeast 32 miles (51 km) to Augusta. Downtown Cincinnati, Ohio, is 10 miles (16 km) to the northwest via Interstate 471.

According to the United States Census Bureau, Silver Grove has a total area of 1.7 square miles (4.3 km^{2}), of which 1.1 square miles (2.9 km^{2}) is land and 0.54 square miles (1.4 km^{2}), or 31.61%, is water.

== Demographics ==
Historical population
Census	Pop.	Note	%±
1960	1,207		—
1970	1,365		13.1%
1980	1,260		−7.7%
1990	1,102		−12.5%
2000	1,215		10.3%
2010	1,102		−9.3%
2020	1,154		4.7%
U.S. Decennial Census

As of the census of 2010, there were 1,102 people, 417 households, and 260 families residing in the city. The population density was 999.8 inhabitants per square mile (386.0/km^{2}). There were 496 housing units at an average density of 408.1 per square mile (157.6/km^{2}). The racial makeup of the city was 98% White, 0.1% African American, 0.1% Asian, 0.4% from other races, and 1.5% from two or more races. Hispanic or Latino of any race were 0.2% of the population.

There were 417 households, out of which 31.4% had children under the age of 18 living with them, 42.2% were married couples living together, 11.5% had a female householder with no husband present, and 37.6% were non-families. 30.2% of all households were made up of individuals, and 6.71% had someone living alone who was 65 years of age or older. The average household size was 2.63 and the average family size was 3.31.

In the city, the population was spread out, with 28.1% under the age of 18, 10.0% from 18 to 24, 32.4% from 25 to 44, 18.0% from 45 to 64, and 11.4% who were 65 years of age or older. The median age was 32 years. For every 100 females, there were 115.0 males. For every 100 females age 18 and over, there were 109.4 males.

The median income for a household in the city was $32,448, and the median income for a family was $41,691. Males had a median income of $36,083 versus $23,977 for females. The per capita income for the city was $15,129. About 8.8% of families and 10.7% of the population were below the poverty line, including 12.2% of those under age 18 and 12.9% of those age 65 or over.

In the 2012 U.S. presidential election, unlike most of Kentucky, the city supported the Democratic candidate Barack Obama.

== Education ==
Silver Grove had its own K-12 school district (all grades housed in one building) until 2019, when the Silver Grove Board of Education voted to merge with Campbell County Schools.

== See also ==
- List of cities and towns along the Ohio River
