= Robert Lawson (American general) =

American patriot and politician

Member of the Virginia House of Delegates from Prince Edward County
- In office October 15, 1787 – 1788 Serving with Patrick Henry
- Preceded by: Richard Bibb
- Succeeded by: Tarleton Woodson
- In office 1782–1783 Serving with John Holcombe, James Allen, Richard Bibb
- Preceded by: Thomas Flournoy
- Succeeded by: William Bibb
- In office 1778–1779 Serving with John Nash
- Preceded by: William Booker
- Succeeded by: Thomas Flournoy

Personal details
- Born: Robert Lawson; January 23, 1748 Prince George County, Colony of Virginia
- Died: March 28, 1805 (aged 57) Richmond, Virginia
- Spouse: Sarah Meriwether Pierce
- Children: 5

Military service
- Allegiance: United States
- Branch/service: Continental Army; Virginia Militia
- Rank: General
- Battles/wars: Battle of Guilford Court House.

Robert Lawson (January 23, 1748 – March 28, 1805) was a Virginia lawyer, planter and politician who distinguished himself in the American Revolutionary War, rising to the rank of brigadier general in the Virginia militia. After the conflict, he practiced law, held various political offices and operated a plantation in Prince Edward County, Virginia, but also suffered from alcoholism, which caused his estrangement from his family as well as being swindled. As discussed by the United States Supreme Court in Wagner v. Baird, 48 U.S. 234 (1849), although granted over 10,000 acres of land in what became the state of Ohio, Lawson transferred those rights to a swindler, so decades later his heirs unsuccessfully sought redress.

== Early life and education ==
Robert Lawson was born January 23, 1748, the son of Benjamin Lawson and his wife, the former Elizabeth Claiborne. His mother would die in Amelia County in 1804, and her brother Philip Whitehead Claiborne represented King William County in the House of Burgesses and her nephew William Dandridge Clairborne would serve in the Virginia House of Delegates representing that county, as discussed below, this man represented Prince Edward County to the west. Sources disagree as to the location of his birth. Professor Ward cites tradition that he was their eldest son and born in Yorkshire, England before his father emigrated to the Virginia colony. His parents married by 1746, and his father died in 1756 in then-vast Prince George County. His mother was of the First Families of Virginia, descended from four generations of men, all named William Claiborne, who were transatlantic merchants as well as major planters and politicians in the Virginia colony. He had a brother named William, who may have died in infancy, as nothing is known about him. Two of his brothers also served as officers during the war: Claiborne Whitehead Lawson (d. August 1780; captain of the 1st Virginia Regiment was mortally wounding at Battle of Hanging Rock in South Carolina), and Benjamin Lawson (1750-1789, clerk of the Prince Edward County Committee of Safety who became captain of the 2nd Virginia Regiment survived the conflict and practiced law in Prince Edward County as well as married). Two other brothers owned land (and moved around) southern Virginia: Philip Whitehead Lawson (d. 1797 moved from Blandford in Prince George County, to Amelia County, Virginia and then into Lunenburg County, Virginia) and Samuel Atkinson Lawson (d. before 1811, owned land in adjacent Amelia, Charlotte and Campbell Counties). Their sisters included Philadelphia Whitehead Lawson (d.1781 who married Abraham West and died in Halifax County); Catherine Lawson (who married twice, surviving her cousin Barbar Claiborne, then marrying Lewis Hood of Nottoway County who moved his family to Howard County, Missouri), Lucy Atkinson Lawson (d. after 1820 who married three times: surviving Abraham Jones as well as Rev. Obediah Echols of Halifax and Pittsylvania Counties, but not her third husband William Rainey), and Elizabeth Lawson (the first wife of William Vassar of Amelia County).

== Prewar ==
By 1773, Robert Lawson had a business partnership with John Nash. He was also a planter and lawyer. By June 19, 1775 he was elected to the Prince Edward County Committee of Safety, which expressed loyalty to the Crown, as well as approved of the attempt of Patrick Henry and his militia to seek compensation for powder that Lord Dunmore had seized from the Colony's main magazine in Williamsburg.

== American Revolutionary War ==
In early 1776 Lawson was commissioned a major in the 4th Virginia Regiment of the Continental Army. He rose to become the colonel commanding the regiment. He resigned from the Continental Army in December 1777.

Lawson returned to active duty in 1779 as a brigadier general in the Virginia militia. According to some accounts, he commanded the Virginia militia at the Battle of Guilford Court House.

=== Continental Service ===
- Major, 4th Virginia, February 13, 1776
- Lieutenant Colonel, 4th Virginia, August 13, 1776
- Colonel, 4th Virginia, August 19, 1777
- Resigned, 17 December 1777

The 4th Virginia Regiment was authorized by the fourth Virginia convention on December 1, 1775, and accepted by Congress on February 13, 1776. The 4th Virginia Regiment joined Washington's army late in 1776 and participated in the battles of Trenton and Germantown. On November 23, 1776, the 4th, 5th, and 6th Virginia Regiments joined the army at New Brunswick, New Jersey, forming a brigade of 745 men under Adam Stephen.

==== Battles of the 4th Virginia Regiment ====
- Battle of Trenton, December 26, 1776
- Second Battle of Trenton, January 1777
- Battle of Princeton, January 1777
- Battle of Brandywine, September 11, 1777
- Battle of Germantown, October 4, 1777

=== Virginia Militia ===
- Colonel, Steven's Brigade, Battle of Camden, August 16, 1780
- General, Lawson's Brigade, Guilford Courthouse, March 15, 1781
- General, Attached with General Steuben, Point of Fork, June 5, 1781
- General, Lawson's Brigade, Siege of Yorktown, September - October 1781

== Public servant ==
- Attended Virginia Convention, St John's Church Richmond, March 177
- Attended Virginia Convention, July 1775
- Attended Virginia Convention, December 1775
- Member Virginia House of Delegates, May 4 - December 19, 1778
- Member Virginia House of Delegates, May 1, 1780 - March 22, 1781
- Member Virginia House of Delegates, May - December 28, 1782
- Member Virginia House of Delegates, May 5 - December 22, 1783
- Member Virginia House of Delegates, October 15, 1787 - January 8, 1788
- Deputy Attorney General Prince Edward County 1784 to April 1788
- Delegate, Convention of the Commonwealth of Virginia on the adoption of the Federal Constitution, June 1788: voted in the minority against ratification of the Federal Constitution, June 25, 1788
- Trustee, Hampden-Sydney College, 1783-1805

== Planter ==
Lawson owned land in Virginia, and because of his patriotic military service, also received warrants in developing areas to the west and north. Although he was listed as nonresident of Prince Edward County in the Virginia tax census of 1787, Lawson owned nine teenage slaves and seven adults, as well as seven horses and twenty-one cattle in the county.

== Personal life ==
On December 13, 1769 Lawson, married Sarah Meriwether Pierce. She had been born in Hanover County Virginia, the daughter of John and Sarah Pierce, and would die on June 10, 1809 in Lexington, Kentucky. They had five children.

== Death and legacy ==
Robert Lawson died on March 28, 1805 in Richmond, Virginia. The Richmond Gazette and General Advertiser noted his funeral was held at the State Capitol that afternoon, and the City Guards escorted his remains to the St. John's Episcopal Churchyard for burial.

== In popular culture ==
In Turn: Washington's Spies, he was portrayed by Virginia Governor Terry McAuliffe in Season 3 Episode 7 "Judgement".
