= Alexandria, Kentucky =

- City
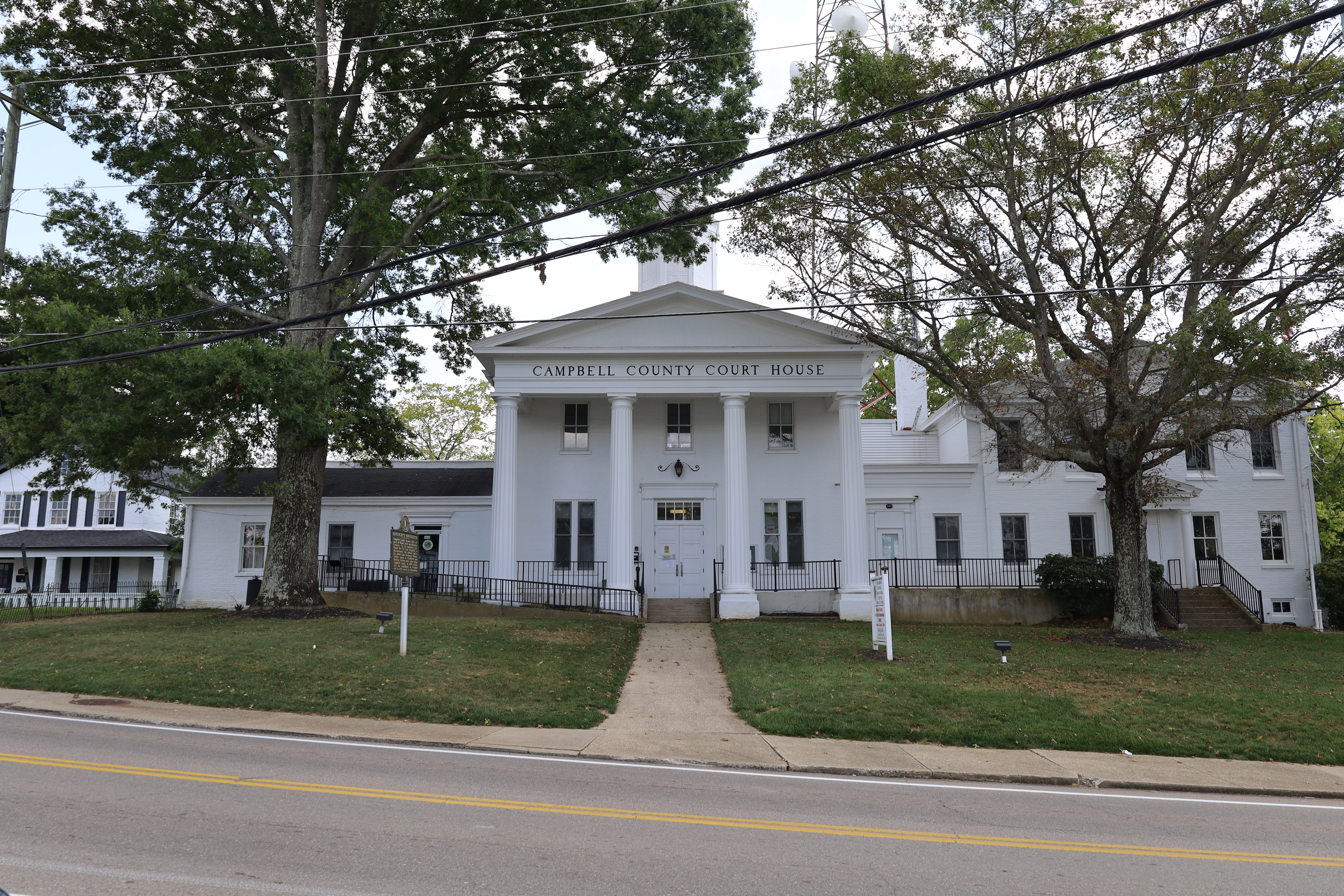
- Old Campbell County Courthouse

- Flag Logo
- Motto: "Where the city meets the country"
- Location of Alexandria in Campbell County, Kentucky.
- Coordinates: 38°57′43″N 84°23′09″W
- Country: United States
- State: Kentucky
- County: Campbell

Government
  - Mayor: Andy Schabell

Area
  - Total: 6.96 sq mi (18.02 km^{2})
  - Land: 6.93 sq mi (17.94 km^{2})
  - Water: 0.031 sq mi (0.08 km^{2})
- Elevation: 820 ft (250 m)

Population (2020)
  - Total: 10,341
  - Estimate (2022): 10,570
  - Density: 1,493.0/sq mi (576.45/km^{2})
- Time zone: UTC-5 (Eastern (EST))
  - Summer (DST): UTC-4 (EDT)
- ZIP code: 41001
- Area code: 859
- FIPS code: 21-00802
- GNIS feature ID: 2403078
- Website: alexandriaky.gov

Alexandria is a home rule-class city in Campbell County, Kentucky, in the United States. Along with Newport, it is one of the dual seats of the county. The population was 10,341 at the 2020 census.

== History ==
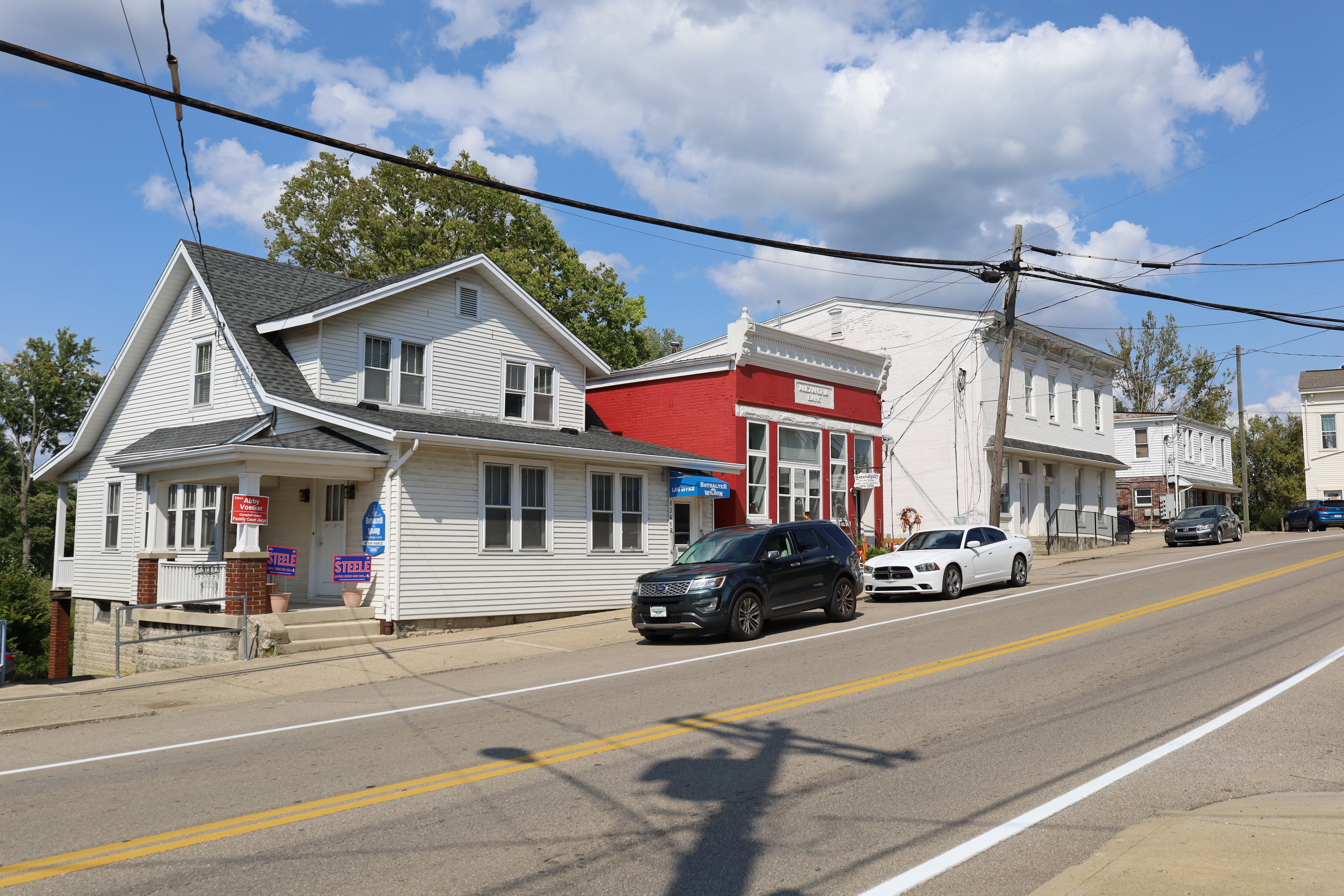
Buildings in the historic downtown

It is believed that the area that is now Alexandria was first settled by Frank Spilman and his family c. 1793. The Spilman family was from King George County, Virginia, and they may have named their settlement after Alexandria, Virginia. The family had begun developing and selling lots in the settlement by 1819, the year the first post office was established. On February 22, 1834, Alexandria was formally established by an act of the state assembly.

When the Kentucky General Assembly formed Kenton County from part of Campbell County in 1840, they moved Campbell's county seat from Newport to Alexandria, which was closer to the center of the redrawn county. The citizens of Alexandria quickly constructed a county courthouse but, because the majority of the county's population lived in Newport, the move was not a popular one and it took a court order and a visit from the sheriff to get the county clerk to move.

The city of Alexandria was formally incorporated by act of the state assembly in 1856.

In 1883, Newport successfully lobbied for its own Court House District, allowing it to retain a Court House Commission with taxing authority and various county offices in addition to those maintained at Alexandria. A new courthouse was established in Newport in 1884, and the county's fiscal court and judicial offices operated out of this while other administrative offices remained in Alexandria. Nonetheless, the county was not dual seated until 2010.

Pro wrestler B. J. Whitmer resides in Alexandria.

== Geography ==
Alexandria is located near the geographic center of Campbell County.

According to the United States Census Bureau, the city has a total area of 6.9 square miles (18.0 km^{2}), of which 6.9 square miles (17.9 km^{2}) is land and 0.04 square miles (0.1 km^{2}), or 0.05%, is water. The city is 14 miles (23 km) south of Cincinnati, Ohio, on U.S. Route 27. Kentucky Route 9, a four-lane limited access highway, follows the northeastern boundary of Alexandria and leads 47 miles (76 km) southeast to Maysville.

== Transportation ==
The second oldest road established in Kentucky was the Old State Road, from Newport to Winchester, through Alexandria, Falmouth, Cynthiana, and Paris. This road was established by an act of the Kentucky Legislature in 1836. County residents formed the Newport and Alexandria Turnpike Company to improve the road; the improved turnpike opened in 1856 under the name Alexandria Pike. The road was financed by toll booths, two of which were located in Alexandria. Desiring a free road to the markets in the county, the county government purchased the road in 1921 and made it part of U.S. Route 27.

Because Alexandria does not lie immediately along the Ohio River, its growth has been limited compared to nearby cities that lie along the river.

== Climate ==
Alexandria is located at the extreme northern limit of the humid subtropical climate of the Southeastern United States and at the extreme southern limit of the humid continental climate of the Great Lakes region; Alexandria is situated in a climatic transition zone and is influenced by both of these climates. Rolling hills, valleys, and some urban heat effects from the nearby metropolitan areas of Cincinnati, Covington, and Newport are moderating factors to the overall climate of Alexandria.

== Demographics ==
Historical population
Census	Pop.	Note	%±
1870	381		—
1880	378		−0.8%
1900	359		—
1910	353		−1.7%
1920	316		−10.5%
1930	424		34.2%
1940	430		1.4%
1950	536		24.7%
1960	1,318		145.9%
1970	3,844		191.7%
1980	4,735		23.2%
1990	5,592		18.1%
2000	8,286		48.2%
2010	8,477		2.3%
2020	10,341		22.0%
2024 (est.)	10,819		4.6%
U.S. Decennial Census

=== 2020 census ===
As of the 2020 census, Alexandria had a population of 10,341. The median age was 39.1 years. 25.0% of residents were under the age of 18 and 15.7% of residents were 65 years of age or older. For every 100 females there were 94.2 males, and for every 100 females age 18 and over there were 92.1 males age 18 and over.

99.6% of residents lived in urban areas, while 0.4% lived in rural areas.

There were 3,819 households in Alexandria, of which 34.6% had children under the age of 18 living in them. Of all households, 59.9% were married-couple households, 13.4% were households with a male householder and no spouse or partner present, and 21.0% were households with a female householder and no spouse or partner present. About 22.3% of all households were made up of individuals and 9.9% had someone living alone who was 65 years of age or older.

There were 3,969 housing units, of which 3.8% were vacant. The homeowner vacancy rate was 1.5% and the rental vacancy rate was 5.4%.

Racial composition as of the 2020 census
Race	Number	Percent
White	9,669	93.5%
Black or African American	81	0.8%
American Indian and Alaska Native	20	0.2%
Asian	99	1.0%
Native Hawaiian and Other Pacific Islander	0	0.0%
Some other race	57	0.6%
Two or more races	415	4.0%
Hispanic or Latino (of any race)	111	1.1%

=== 2000 census ===
As of the 2000 census, there were 8,286 people, 2,884 households, and 2,275 families residing in the city. The population density was 1,538.7 inhabitants per square mile (594.1/km^{2}). There were 2,989 housing units at an average density of 555.1 per square mile (214.3/km^{2}). The racial makeup of the city was 98.82% White, 0.02% African American, 0.02% Native American, 0.46% Asian, 0.34% from other races, and 0.34% from two or more races. Hispanic or Latino of any race were 0.76% of the population.

There were 2,884 households, out of which 44.2% had children under the age of 18 living with them, 68.2% were married couples living together, 7.7% had a female householder with no husband present, and 21.1% were non-families. 18.7% of all households were made up of individuals, and 6.8% had someone living alone who was 65 years of age or older. The average household size was 2.87 and the average family size was 3.29.

In the city, the population was spread out, with 30.8% under the age of 18, 7.9% from 18 to 24, 33.2% from 25 to 44, 19.7% from 45 to 64, and 8.4% who were 65 years of age or older. The median age was 33 years. For every 100 females, there were 96.0 males. For every 100 females age 18 and over, there were 94.6 males.

The median income for a household in the city was $83,923 and the median income for a family was $62,392. Males had a median income of $42,002 versus $30,766 for females. The per capita income for the city was $31,819. About 2.5% of families and 4.0% of the population were below the poverty line, including 3.2% of those under age 18 and 8.6% of those age 65 or over.

== Education ==
Residents are within the Campbell County Schools. Residents are zoned to Campbell County High School in Claryville, Kentucky.

Bishop Brossart High School, a private Catholic school, is located in Alexandria but draws from a wider area. Alexandria has a public library, a branch of the Campbell County Public Library.

== Events and attractions ==
The Agricultural Society of Campbell County was organized in 1856. It organized a fair for the benefit of the farmers. This fair has numerous horse show events that are not only popular in Kentucky but around the world. The fair brings high standard horses from around the mideast.

== Notable people ==
- Mike Clines, Kentucky politician and resident of Alexandria
- Ciara Bravo, actress
