= Wilder, Kentucky =

- City
- Wilder City Building

- Seal

- Location of Wilder in Campbell County, Kentucky.
- Coordinates: 39°02′24″N 84°28′54″W
- Country: United States
- State: Kentucky
- County: Campbell

Government
  - Type: Mayor-Council
  - Mayor: Valerie Jones

Area
  - Total: 3.75 sq mi (9.72 km^{2})
  - Land: 3.63 sq mi (9.39 km^{2})
  - Water: 0.13 sq mi (0.33 km^{2})
- Elevation: 646 ft (197 m)

Population (2020)
  - Total: 3,176
  - Estimate (2024): 3,091
  - Density: 876.1/sq mi (338.26/km^{2})
- Time zone: UTC-5 (Eastern (EST))
  - Summer (DST): UTC-4 (EDT)
- ZIP codes: 41071, 41076
- Area code: 859
- FIPS code: 21-83172
- GNIS feature ID: 2405743
- Website: wilderky.gov

Wilder is a home rule-class city in Campbell County, Kentucky, United States. The population was 3,176 at the 2020 census. It is part of the Cincinnati-Northern Kentucky metropolitan area.

== Geography ==
According to the United States Census Bureau, the city has a total area of 3.8 square miles (9.8 km^{2}), of which 3.7 square miles (9.6 km^{2}) is land and 0.1 square miles (0.26 km^{2}) (2.89%) is water.

== History ==
Wilder was once known as Leitch's Station. It was the first settlement in Campbell County. The name Wilder dates back to a railroad station built in the mid-19th century for the Louisville, Cincinnati and Lexington Railway named Wilder station. St. John the Baptist Roman Catholic Church was built in 1858 by German immigrants. "Wilder Station" is now located on property owned by Newport Steel. It is the home of supposed ghostly hauntings at the country music nightclub and honky tonk, Bobby Mackey's Music World, which has been called "the most haunted nightclub in America".

== Demographics ==
Historical population
Census	Pop.	Note	%±
1940	287		—
1950	204		−28.9%
1960	239		17.2%
1970	823		244.4%
1980	633		−23.1%
1990	691		9.2%
2000	2,624		279.7%
2010	3,035		15.7%
2020	3,176		4.6%
2024 (est.)	3,091		−2.7%
U.S. Decennial Census

=== 2020 census ===
As of the 2020 census, Wilder had a population of 3,176. The median age was 39.0 years. 16.5% of residents were under the age of 18 and 17.7% of residents were 65 years of age or older. For every 100 females there were 86.7 males, and for every 100 females age 18 and over there were 84.0 males age 18 and over.

100.0% of residents lived in urban areas, while 0.0% lived in rural areas.

There were 1,483 households in Wilder, of which 19.5% had children under the age of 18 living in them. Of all households, 37.3% were married-couple households, 21.3% were households with a male householder and no spouse or partner present, and 34.9% were households with a female householder and no spouse or partner present. About 36.7% of all households were made up of individuals and 13.8% had someone living alone who was 65 years of age or older.

There were 1,561 housing units, of which 5.0% were vacant. The homeowner vacancy rate was 1.4% and the rental vacancy rate was 3.9%.

Racial composition as of the 2020 census
Race	Number	Percent
White	2,846	89.6%
Black or African American	115	3.6%
American Indian and Alaska Native	1	0.0%
Asian	61	1.9%
Native Hawaiian and Other Pacific Islander	0	0.0%
Some other race	19	0.6%
Two or more races	134	4.2%
Hispanic or Latino (of any race)	68	2.1%

=== 2000 census ===
As of the census of 2000, there were 2,624 people, 1,162 households, and 743 families residing in the city. The population density was 707.8 inhabitants per square mile (273.3/km^{2}). There were 1,200 housing units at an average density of 323.7 per square mile (125.0/km^{2}). The racial makeup of the city was 94.51% White, 2.29% African American, 0.11% Native American, 1.56% Asian, 0.53% from other races, and 0.99% from two or more races. Hispanic or Latino of any race were 0.95% of the population.

There were 1,162 households, out of which 28.1% had children under the age of 18 living with them, 49.5% were married couples living together, 12.4% had a female householder with no husband present, and 36.0% were non-families. 31.2% of all households were made up of individuals, and 7.1% had someone living alone who was 65 years of age or older. The average household size was 2.26 and the average family size was 2.85.

In the city, the population was spread out, with 23.0% under the age of 18, 7.2% from 18 to 24, 35.2% from 25 to 44, 23.3% from 45 to 64, and 11.3% who were 65 years of age or older. The median age was 36 years. For every 100 females, there were 82.3 males. For every 100 females age 18 and over, there were 80.5 males.

The median income for a household in the city was $49,567, and the median income for a family was $65,089. Males had a median income of $42,380 versus $35,230 for females. The per capita income for the city was $27,693. About 5.9% of families and 7.0% of the population were below the poverty line, including 12.7% of those under age 18 and 2.0% of those age 65 or over.
