= National Register of Historic Places listings in Bracken County, Kentucky =

Location of Bracken County in Kentucky

This is a list of the National Register of Historic Places listings in Bracken County, Kentucky.

This is intended to be a complete list of the properties and districts on the National Register of Historic Places in Bracken County, Kentucky, United States. The locations of National Register properties and districts for which the latitude and longitude coordinates are included below, may be seen in a map.

There are 25 properties and districts listed on the National Register in the county.

This National Park Service list is complete through NPS recent listings posted April 3, 2026.

== Current listings ==
	Name on the Register	Image	Date listed	Location	City or town	Description
1	Augusta College Historic Buildings	Augusta College Historic Buildings	February 20, 1980 (#80001486)	205 Frankfort St. and 204 Bracken St. 38°46′27″N 84°00′09″W	Augusta	
2	Augusta Historic District	Augusta Historic District	March 13, 1984 (#84001385)	Roughly bounded by Riverside Dr., 5th, Frankfort, and Williams Sts. 38°46′21″N 84°00′21″W	Augusta	
3	Baker Vineyard and Wine Cellar	Baker Vineyard and Wine Cellar	December 30, 1974 (#74000855)	South of Augusta on Kentucky Route 1839; also 4465 W. Augusta-Chatham Rd. 38°46′07″N 83°59′39″W	Augusta	Augusta-Chatham Road address represents a boundary increase of July 11, 2007
4	George W. Barkley Farm	George W. Barkley Farm	June 18, 2003 (#03000259)	Kentucky Route 8; 38°46′39″N 83°57′58″W	Augusta	
5	Bold House		March 13, 2017 (#100000734)	98 Main St. 38°47′55″N 84°12′48″W	Foster	
6	Bracken County Infirmary	Bracken County Infirmary	April 16, 1979 (#79000966)	Northeast of Chatham on Kentucky Route 19; 38°43′02″N 84°00′48″W	Chatham	
7	Bradford School House	Bradford School House	June 18, 2003 (#03000263)	Kentucky Routes 8 and 1109; 38°46′50″N 84°08′25″W	Foster	
8	Brothers-O'Neil House	Brothers-O'Neil House	May 22, 1984 (#84001390)	308 Seminary Rd. 38°46′23″N 84°00′00″W	Augusta	
9	Mordecai Chalfant House	Mordecai Chalfant House	January 8, 1987 (#87000142)	Kentucky Route 8; 38°46′01″N 84°04′58″W	Augusta	
10	Confederate Monument in Augusta	Confederate Monument in Augusta	July 17, 1997 (#97000715)	Payne Cemetery, north of Kentucky Route 8; 38°46′09″N 84°00′44″W	Augusta	
11	Dwyer House		April 3, 2026 (#100012875)	580 Old KY 19 #2; 38°41′40″N 84°03′34″W	Brooksville vicinity	
12	John Gregg Fee House		August 26, 1980 (#80001487)	Northwest of Germantown; 38°41′32″N 83°59′37″W	Germantown	
13	Evan Griffith's Grocery	Evan Griffith's Grocery	May 22, 1984 (#84001392)	415 Railroad Ave. 38°46′25″N 84°00′04″W	Augusta	
14	Alfonso McKibben House	Alfonso McKibben House	May 22, 1984 (#84001394)	202 4th St. 38°46′13″N 84°00′30″W	Augusta	
15	J. R. Minor House	J. R. Minor House	May 22, 1984 (#84001395)	204 2nd St. 38°46′24″N 84°00′34″W	Augusta	
16	F.A. Neider Company		April 16, 2024 (#100009535)	207 Seminary; 38°46′28″N 84°00′01″W	Augusta	
17	Rock Spring Warehouse	Rock Spring Warehouse	January 8, 1987 (#87000175)	Kentucky Route 8; 38°46′06″N 84°05′34″W	Wellsburg	
18	Snag Creek Site (15BK2)	Snag Creek Site (15BK2)	November 14, 1985 (#85002821)	Western side of Snag Creek, 0.25 miles (0.40 km) south of the Ohio River; 38°47′17″N 84°10′09″W	Willow Grove	Extends west as far as Snag Creek Road
19	Stone House on Bracken Creek		January 8, 1987 (#87000199)	Off Kentucky Route 435; 38°45′11″N 83°57′57″W	Augusta	
20	Stroube House	Stroube House	January 8, 1987 (#87000140)	Kentucky Route 616; 38°45′01″N 83°59′13″W	Augusta	
21	Turtle Creek Site (15BK13)		November 14, 1985 (#85002824)	Ohio River bank, west of Augusta; 38°46′11″N 84°01′39″W	Augusta	
22	Walcott Covered Bridge	Walcott Covered Bridge	June 10, 1975 (#75000738)	3.5 miles north of Brooksville on Kentucky Route 1159 over Locust Creek; 38°44′00″N 84°06′02″W	Brooksville	
23	Water Street Historic District	Water Street Historic District	September 24, 1975 (#75000737)	River Side Drive east to Frankfort Street and west to Ferry Street; 38°46′28″N 84°00′28″W	Augusta	
24	James Weldon House	James Weldon House	May 22, 1984 (#84001384)	417 Railroad St. 38°46′25″N 84°00′03″W	Augusta	
25	Wells-Keith House	Wells-Keith House	May 22, 1984 (#84001398)	411-413 3rd St. 38°46′24″N 84°00′05″W	Augusta	

== See also ==
- List of National Historic Landmarks in Kentucky
- National Register of Historic Places listings in Kentucky
