= Keith House =

Keith House may refer to:

== People ==
- Keith E. House (1926–2005), American music educator
- Keith House (politician)

== Buildings ==
- Agnes Keith House, Sandakan, Sabah, Malaysia
- Keith House (Little Rock, Arkansas)
- Keith Cabin, Pittman, Florida
- Edson Keith Estate, Sarasota, Florida
- Wells-Keith House, Augusta, Kentucky
- Reverend James Keith Parsonage, also known as Keith House, 17th-century building in West Bridgewater, Massachusetts
- Charles S. Keith House, Kansas City, Missouri
- David Keith House, Kirkwood, Missouri, listed on the NRHP in St. Louis County, Missouri
- Harry C. Keith House, Kalispell, Montana, listed on the NRHP in Flathead County, Montana
- John M. Keith House, Missoula, Montana
- Clark-Keith House, Caledonia, New York
- Keith House (Horsham Township, Pennsylvania)
- Keith House (Upper Makefield Township, Pennsylvania)
- Alexander H. Keith House, Athens, Tennessee
- Keith House (Austin, Texas)
- David Keith Mansion and Carriage House, Salt Lake City, Utah
