= James Ohio Pattie =

American frontiersman from Kentucky

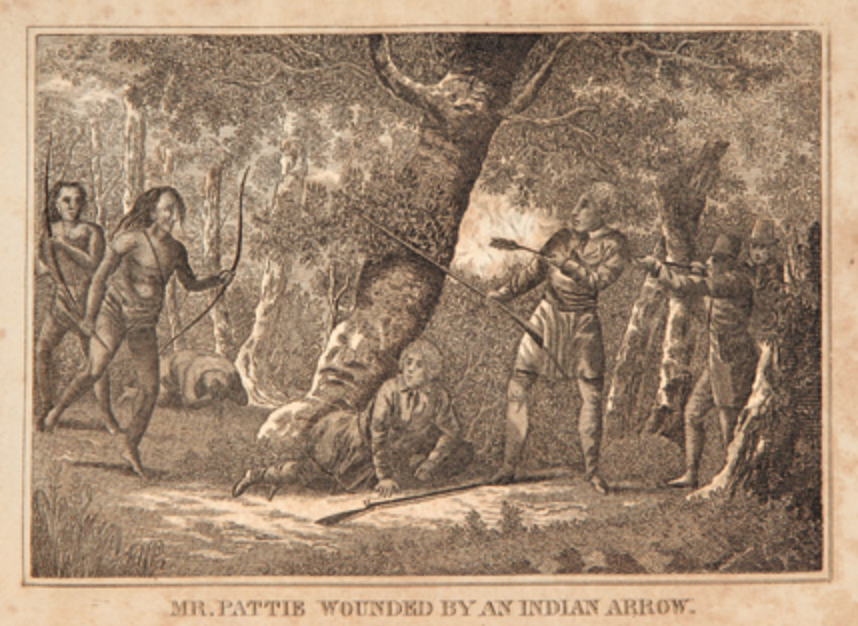
Pattie wounded by a Native American's arrow in 1827, from his autobiography

James Ohio Pattie (c. 1804 – c. 1850) was an American frontiersman and author from Kentucky. Between 1824 and 1830, Pattie took part in a series of fur trapping and trading expeditions, traveling through the American West and Southwest and into modern-day northern and central Mexico.

In 1831, Pattie collaborated with Kentucky newspaperman Timothy Flint to publish an account of his travels, which has been praised by historians for its vivid descriptions of the Southwest, although the exact veracity of Pattie's account is disputed.

== Expeditions ==
=== 1824–1826: Missouri and Gila Rivers ===
Pattie and his father, Sylvester, set out from St. Louis in June 1824, traveling along the Missouri River to trade with Plains Indian tribes. Upon reaching a military post at Council Bluffs in modern-day Iowa, the Patties were told they could go no farther up the Missouri without a permit. Rather than returning to St. Louis, the elder Pattie elected to join a Santa Fe-bound pack train led by Sylvester Pratte. Due to his military background, the elder Pattie was invited to take command of the group, which consisted of 116 men and over 300 horses and mules.

The group reached Santa Fe in November 1825, where they petitioned the governor for permission to trap beaver along the Gila River. While their request was initially denied, James claimed the group was granted a license to trap after rescuing the governor's daughter from a nearby band of Mescalero Apache. However, this story was likely fabricated, and the Patties probably commenced trapping along the Gila illegally.

From Santa Fe, Sylvester, James and three guides traveled south down the Rio Grande before turning west toward the Santa Rita copper mines, where they stopped briefly for supplies. They spent the winter trapping beaver on the Gila River as far west as the Salt River Junction near modern-day Phoenix, but they met little success. The group encountered bears, small bands of raiding Native Americans and bouts of disease and starvation, and by the beginning of 1826, they had resorted to eating their own horses as well as a grizzly bear. Their luck turned around in the early months of 1826, and by late March the group had cached hundreds of beaver pelts along the river with hopes of returning once they could acquire pack animals to carry the load.

In April, the Patties arrived back at the Santa Rita mine, where the proprietor offered Sylvester control of operations. The elder Pattie managed the mine profitably with two partners until 1827, leaving James to trap on his own.

=== 1826–27: Colorado River ===
In June 1826, Pattie claims he took part in an expedition down the Gila River to the San Pedro fork to retrieve the cached furs. While this expedition did occur, Pattie was most likely not present, since he served as a witness to a promissory note signed at the mine on June 14. The expedition returned in early July without a single pelt after discovering that Indians had taken the cached furs, which were likely worth thousands of dollars.

With the fall trapping season still months away, Pattie spent the summer of 1826 employed at the mine, earning one dollar a day in exchange for protecting the mine from Apache raids. Pattie acquired several valuable skills from his interactions with the diverse peoples passing through the Santa Rita area, and he claims he learned spoken Spanish over the course of a few months from Juan Onis, who had previously operated the mine. Pattie eventually became fluent enough to serve as an interpreter in his later travels. In addition, Pattie became better able to distinguish the indigenous tribes of the Southwest, which proved useful during his next trapping expedition.

Despite his father's insistence that James stay at the mine through the winter, Pattie set out in January 1827, intending to travel the Gila to its junction with the Colorado River. The party spent a few days in a Yuma village at the mouth of the Colorado gathering supplies before heading several miles up the river, where they met and traded with a group of Maricopa people. A week later, the party encountered a band of Mohave, whom Pattie and another trapper in his party, George Yount, had heard about and considered hostile. Indeed, the band attacked Pattie's party the morning after their arrival, but the Mohave were easily forced to retreat.

Following the skirmish with the Mohave, Pattie's account of the expedition becomes unusually vague, especially considering the vast distance it allegedly covered. After traveling the Colorado into Navajo territory, the expedition allegedly crossed the Continental Divide and turned northward, trapping along the Platte, Bighorn and Yellowstone rivers. Pattie claims the party ventured as far north as the Clark Fork of the Columbia River in modern-day Montana before coming to a Zuni village in western New Mexico. Since this journey amounts to around 2,000 miles (3,200 km) of travel in 85 days, Pattie's account is almost certainly false. In all likelihood, Pattie was reciting the names of rivers he had learned from other trappers, and the party only briefly ventured away from the Colorado when they reached the impassable Grand Canyon.

When the party reached the Zuni village, multiple members had died, and the survivors were suffering from near starvation. However, the expedition was an immense success as they returned with furs worth almost $20,000. Yet upon the party's return to Santa Fe in August, soldiers seized the furs under order of the governor in Santa Fe, who accused the party of trapping without a license.

=== 1827–28: Pecos, Gila and Colorado Rivers ===
Although the dates Pattie provides for his travels in the spring and summer of 1827 are confusing and likely inaccurate, he did lead a brief hunting trip along the Pecos River after arriving in Santa Fe in an attempt to replace some of his lost goods. Composed of Pattie and fifteen other Americans, the Pecos expedition was attacked by Indians, whom Pattie accurately recognized as a band of Mescalero Apache. Although most of the party survived, Pattie was wounded in the hip and the chest by arrows. On the return journey, the party encountered a group of Navajo who had been tracking the Mescalero, and whose medicine man treated Pattie's wounds in exchange for Mescalero scalps.

The party successfully evaded the governor after returning to Santa Fe and made a decent profit from selling their furs. From there, they returned to Santa Rita. Shortly thereafter, a Spanish bookkeeper stole $30,000 from Pattie's father, effectively bankrupting the Patties. In September 1827, Sylvester secured a passport in Santa Fe, which the Patties intended to use to reach California.

On the way down the Gila River to California, half the trappers deserted, and every pack animal the party had either died, got lost or was stolen by the same Native Americans in Yuma that had treated Pattie kindly the year prior. The remaining eight members of the expedition constructed makeshift canoes and floated down the Colorado River until they reached the Gulf of California, where the powerful tidal bore forced the Patties to leave their boats a few miles upriver. They had amassed hundreds of furs, worth between $25,000–$30,000, which they cached near the river in February 1827.

The group then traveled west in stages among several Spanish settlements and missions. After requesting to purchase horses to retrieve their cached furs, the party was escorted to San Diego in late spring 1828, where the Patties were detained and questioned by a California territorial governor, José Maria de Echeandia.

=== 1828–29: Imprisonment ===
Upon reaching San Diego, the Patties and their party were disarmed and imprisoned under suspicion of forging their passport. The elder Pattie had fallen ill prior to their arrival, and his condition gradually worsened in prison. Sylvester died on April 24 and was buried shortly thereafter, becoming the first recorded American to be buried in California.

Following his father's death, James served as a translator between Echeandia and John Bradshaw, captain of the American vessel Franklin, who had offered to purchase Pattie's furs should they be retrieved. Echeandia agreed to allow the trappers to return to the cache under the condition that Pattie remain in San Diego as a hostage. While waiting for the party, Pattie relayed the story of his travels, his imprisonment and his father's death to Bradshaw. Pattie's brief account was published a year later in a St. Louis newspaper, giving his remaining family their first news of either Pattie since 1824.

Only three members of the original party survived and returned to San Diego several weeks later. A spring flood had destroyed the entire cache of furs, and the traps they recovered were sold to pay for the horses and mules they had used. Pattie claims they were again disarmed and imprisoned, yet this is likely an exaggeration. However, Echeandia required the trappers to remain in San Diego and did not allow Pattie to leave the city until February or March 1829, almost a year after his arrival.

=== 1829–30: California coast ===
Pattie says that he was released by Echeandia due to an outbreak of smallpox in the winter of 1828–29, and he had been hired by the governor to vaccinate every Californian along the Pacific coast. While there had been a recent epidemic in California, the culprit was measles, not smallpox. Furthermore, the outbreak began in October 1827, several months before Pattie arrived in San Diego, and it had ended by June 1828.

The more likely possibility is that Pattie had heard about the epidemic and inserted himself in a lead role when retelling the story. The vaccination story serves to cast Pattie's ensuing travels in California in a heroic light, but he probably spent much of the next year destitute. He traveled northward with his three remaining companions to Los Angeles, where all except Pattie quickly settled down and married into Catholic Californian families.

Pattie spent the remainder of 1829 exploring the coast of California, and while his claims of vaccinating people along the way is likely false, his descriptions of the missions and settlements in the region are detailed and accurate. Pattie traveled as far north as the Russian settlement Fort Ross, about 90 miles north of San Francisco, before returning south to Monterey to book passage to Mexico.

In November 1829, a revolutionary force led by Joaquin Solis arose in Monterey before traveling south to meet Echeandia's army at Santa Barbara. Following Solis' defeat, he was captured and returned to Monterey. While Pattie accurately documents the events of the revolution, he falsely claims that he led the party to capture Solis. In actuality, Pattie was not involved in the revolution, and he spent months waiting for a passenger ship in Monterey. He used this time to hunt otter nearby, earning $300 that he used to finance part of his journey.

In March 1830, American consul John Coffin Jones arrived in Monterey aboard the Volunteer. In addition to allowing Pattie to join the vessel, Jones offered to transport Solis and several other revolutionary leaders to Mexico City for trial. Pattie met with Echeandia once more to air his grievances and obtain a passport for Mexico. While Echeandia understood Pattie's complaints about his previous imprisonment, he denied any wrongdoing, claiming that he was only following the law. Nevertheless, he issued Pattie his passport, and the Volunteer left Monterey on May 9, 1830.

=== 1830: Mexico and Pattie's return voyage ===
Nine days after departing Monterey, the Volunteer arrived in San Blas, Mexico. Pattie did not go on any expeditions in Mexico, but he did plan to stop in Mexico City in an attempt to receive compensation for his imprisonment under Echeandia. Upon reaching Mexico City in early June, Pattie met with the American chargé d'affaires, Anthony Butler. Butler presented Pattie with a letter from Secretary of state Martin Van Buren, who had urged Butler to try to free Pattie from prison.

Butler arranged a meeting with Mexican president Anastasio Bustamante at which Pattie could formally lodge his complaints. While Bustamante was sympathetic to Pattie's situation, he did not offer any recompense. However, he did inform Pattie that Echeandia had been replaced as territorial governor due to undisclosed transgressions.

Bustamante granted Pattie a passport to return home through the port of Vera Cruz. Although Pattie was essentially broke by the time he arrived in Vera Cruz, the American consul there, Isaac Stone, arranged for his free passage to the US. On July 17, 1830, Pattie boarded the ship United States bound for New Orleans.

The day after Pattie arrived in New Orleans two weeks later, the Louisiana Advertiser announced his return. Again Pattie did not have the funds to travel the remainder of the way to Kentucky, but Louisiana senator Josiah Johnston, who had grown up fifteen miles from Pattie's father and knew some of Pattie's family, offered to pay for his passage up the Mississippi River aboard the steamboat Cora.

== Personal Narrative and disappearance ==
While Pattie was on his way back home to Augusta, Kentucky, Johnston introduced him to newspaperman Timothy Flint in Cincinnati, and Pattie and Flint agreed to meet later so that Pattie could dictate the story of his travels.

Pattie returned to Augusta on August 30, 1830. The following year, Flint published The Personal Narrative of James O. Pattie of Kentucky, Pattie's account of his time in the Southwest. Despite Flint's previous success as an author, the book did not garner much attention save for a brief mention in the Cincinnati Mirror calling the book "interesting". It has since been praised by historians for its vivid descriptions of the Southwest, who argue that Pattie likely embellished his role in some events.

The details of the rest of Pattie's life are sparse. For a time, he attended Augusta College in Kentucky. The last documented evidence of Pattie is on a tax list for Bracken County, Kentucky, in 1833, and his total taxable property consisted of two horses valued at $75 together. California politician William Waldo claimed to have met Pattie in the Sierra Nevada mountains in 1849 during the Gold Rush, but this claim has never been corroborated.
