= Augusta College Historic Buildings =

- U.S. National Register of Historic Places
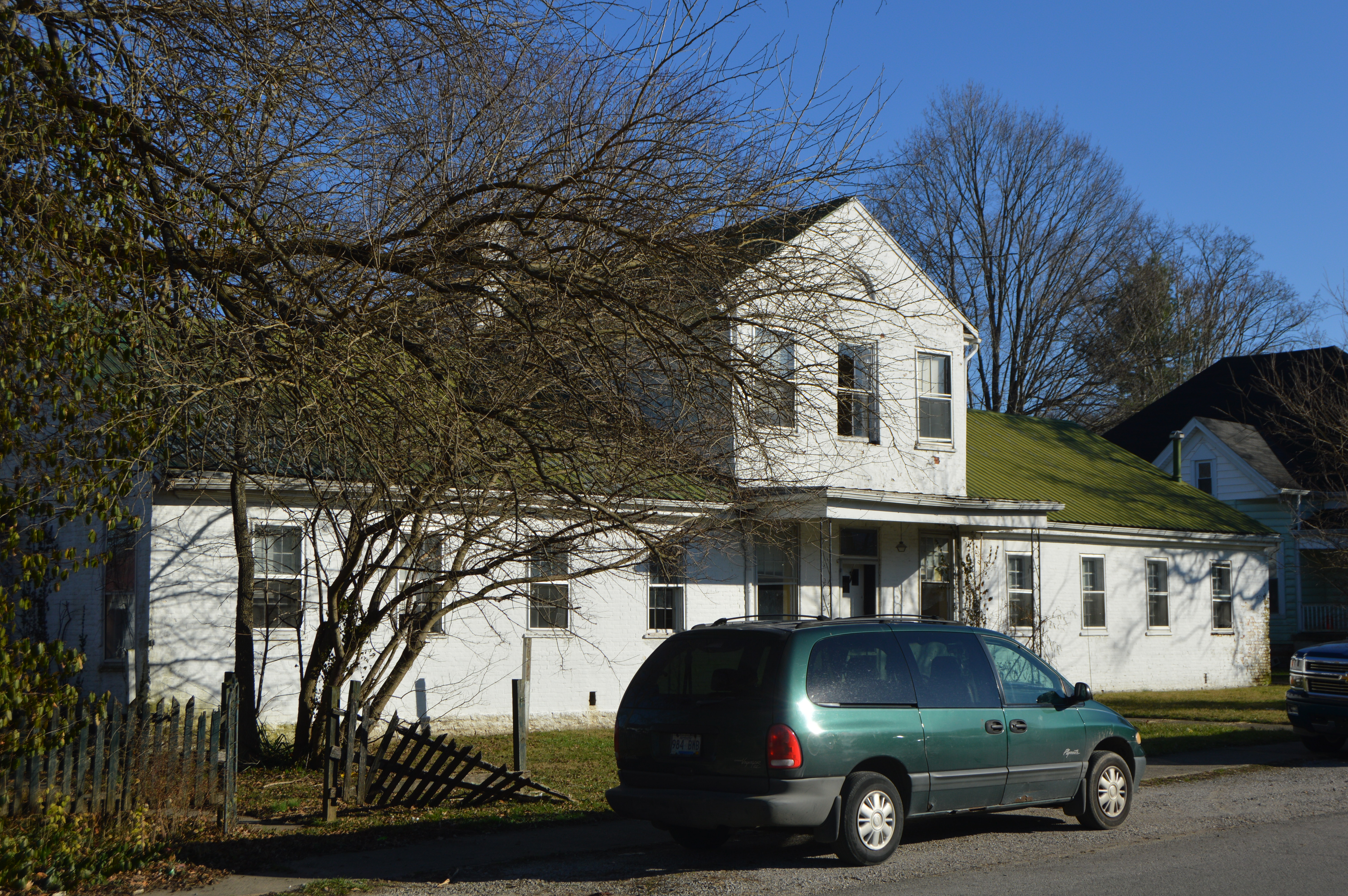
- The former Echo Hall

- Location within Kentucky Location within the United States
- Location: 205 Frankfort St. and 204 Bracken St., Augusta, Kentucky
- Coordinates: 38°46′26″N 84°0′15″W
- Area: 0.4 acres (0.16 ha)
- Built: 1825
- NRHP reference No.: 80001486
- Added to NRHP: February 20, 1980

The Augusta College Historic Buildings are two former dormitory buildings built for Augusta College in Augusta, Kentucky. Echo Hall, located on the east side of Frankfort Street, is a two-story brick building with a front-facing central gable and flanking side-gable wings. West Hall, located on the west side of Bracken Street, is a simpler two-story brick building with a side gable roof and five-bay facade. Both were built in the 1820s to house students at the recently established Augusta College, one of the first Methodist higher education establishments in the United States. The school was closed in 1849.

The two buildings, now used as private residences, were listed on the National Register of Historic Places in 1980.

== See also ==
- National Register of Historic Places listings in Bracken County, Kentucky
