= Sylvester Pattie =

American frontiersman (1782–1828)

Sylvester Pattie (1782–1828) was a frontiersman in the early United States.

He was born at Craig's Station in Kentucky on 25 August 1782 while his father, John, was burying casualties of the Battle of Blue Licks. His family moved to Bracken County and he was educated at the Bracken Academy. He became a prosperous landowner and married Polly Hubbard in 1802. They had nine children starting with James. He moved his family to St Charles, Missouri in 1811 and built mills on the Big Piney River.

When his wife died of tuberculosis in 1822, he became disconsolate and went adventuring with his son James. They engaged in trapping along the Gila and Colorado rivers, tried copper mining in Santa Rita, New Mexico and eventually wound up in San Diego where they were imprisoned by the Mexicans who then ruled California. Sylvester died in prison on 24 May 1828.
