= Water Street Historic District =

Water Street Historic District or Water Street Commercial Historic District may refer to:

- Water Street Historic District National Historic Site of Canada, St. John's, Newfoundland and Labrador, Canada
- Water Street Historic District (Torrington, Connecticut)
- Water Street Historic District (Augusta, Kentucky)
- Water Street Historic District (Clifton, Tennessee)
- Water Street Historic District (Eau Claire, Wisconsin)
- Water Street Commercial Historic District (Shullsburg, Wisconsin)
- Water Street Commercial Historic District (Sparta, Wisconsin), a National Register of Historic Places listing in Monroe County, Wisconsin

== See also ==
- Broad Street–Water Street Historic District, Lyons, New York
- Plankinton-Wells-Water Street Historic District, a National Register of Historic Places listing in Milwaukee, Wisconsin
- St. Paul-North Water Streets Historic District, Rochester, New York
- South Water Street Historic District, Martinsburg, West Virginia
- Water Street Commercial Buildings, a National Register of Historic Places listing in Sandusky, Ohio
- Water Street District (disambiguation)
