= Rosemary Clooney Museum =

Museum in Augusta, Kentucky, United States

Coordinates: 38.77474°N 84.00726°W

The Rosemary Clooney Museum is located in a historic 1835 house, located on Riverside Drive, in Augusta, Kentucky. This is the house the late Rosemary Clooney called home for more than 20 years.

More than 700 pieces of clothing worn by Clooney, Bing Crosby, Bob Hope, Barbara Stanwyck, Jack Benny, Vivien Leigh, Cary Grant, Jerry Lewis and others were rescued after the Clooney search began. Across the hall, guests will be able to visit the Miss America room which will display the gowns, crowns and memorabilia of Augusta native Heather French Henry, from her days as Miss Kentucky and Miss America 2000.

The museum opened on Sunday, October 2, 2005.
