= Augusta High School (Kentucky) =

Augusta Independent School
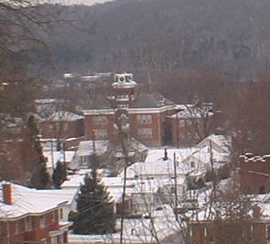

Location
- 207 Bracken Street; Augusta, Kentucky 41002; United States; 38°46′25″N 84°0′12″W

Information
- Type: Public
- Motto: Latin: Veritas, Laude, Fides (Truth, Honor, Loyalty)
- Established: 1887; 139 years ago
- School district: Augusta Independent Schools
- Principal: Robin Kelsch
- Teaching staff: 22.54 (FTE)
- Grades: PK–12
- Enrollment: 320 (2023–2024)
- Student to teacher ratio: 14.20
- Colors: Orange; Black
- Athletics conference: KHSAA Class A
- Mascot: Panthers
- Website: school.augusta.kyschools.us

Augusta Independent School is a public school in Augusta, Kentucky, United States, for pre-kindergarten through the twelfth grade. It is the only school in the Augusta Independent Schools school district in Bracken County, Kentucky, founded in 1887.

== Athletics ==
The Augusta Panthers compete in volleyball, cross country, archery, basketball, tennis, golf, baseball and softball. The Panthers Den, established in 1926, is still the oldest used basketball court in the state of Kentucky.

== Notable alumni ==
- George Clooney, actor
