= James Weldon House =

Historic house in Kentucky, United States

- U.S. National Register of Historic Places
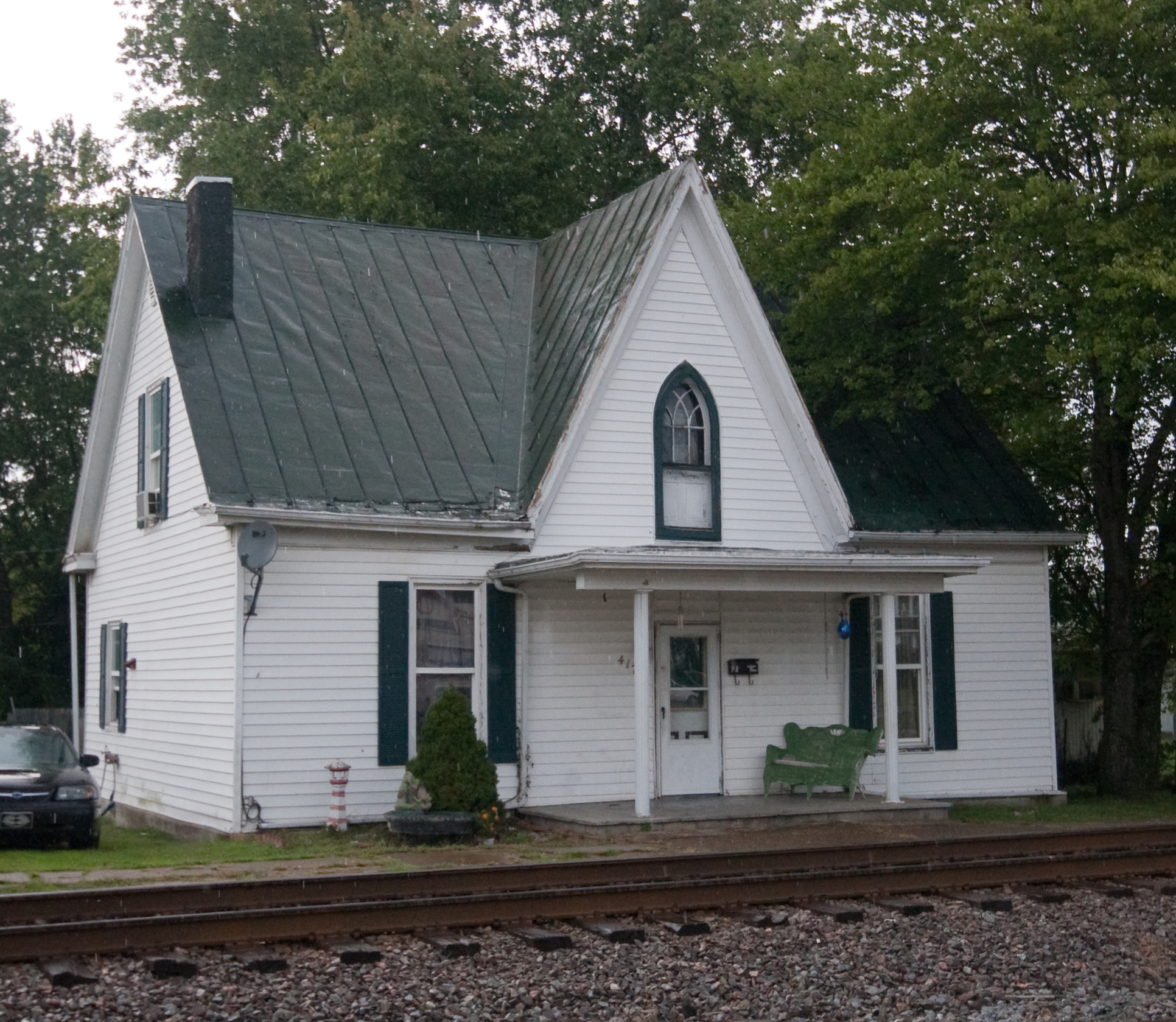

- Location within Kentucky Location within the United States
- Location: 417 3rd St., Augusta, Kentucky
- Coordinates: 38°46′25″N 84°0′3″W
- Built: 1860–1870
- Architectural style: Carpenter Gothic
- NRHP reference No.: 84001384
- Added to NRHP: May 22, 1984

The James Weldon House is a historic house in Augusta, Kentucky. It is an unaltered example of Gothic vernacular architecture.

The three bay frame house is distinguished by a center gable and lancet style window. Side elevations have cornice returns and six-over-six windows. The front elevation has two-over-two lights on the first floor and a transom window over front door. Other details include small circular attic vents in the side gables and a front porch added later. The roof is covered in ribbed metal. Foundation material is rubble limestone.

James W. Weldon was listed as the owner of record in 1877. W.T. Fields acquired the property by 1884.
