= Brothers-O'Neil House =

Historic house in Kentucky, United States

- U.S. National Register of Historic Places
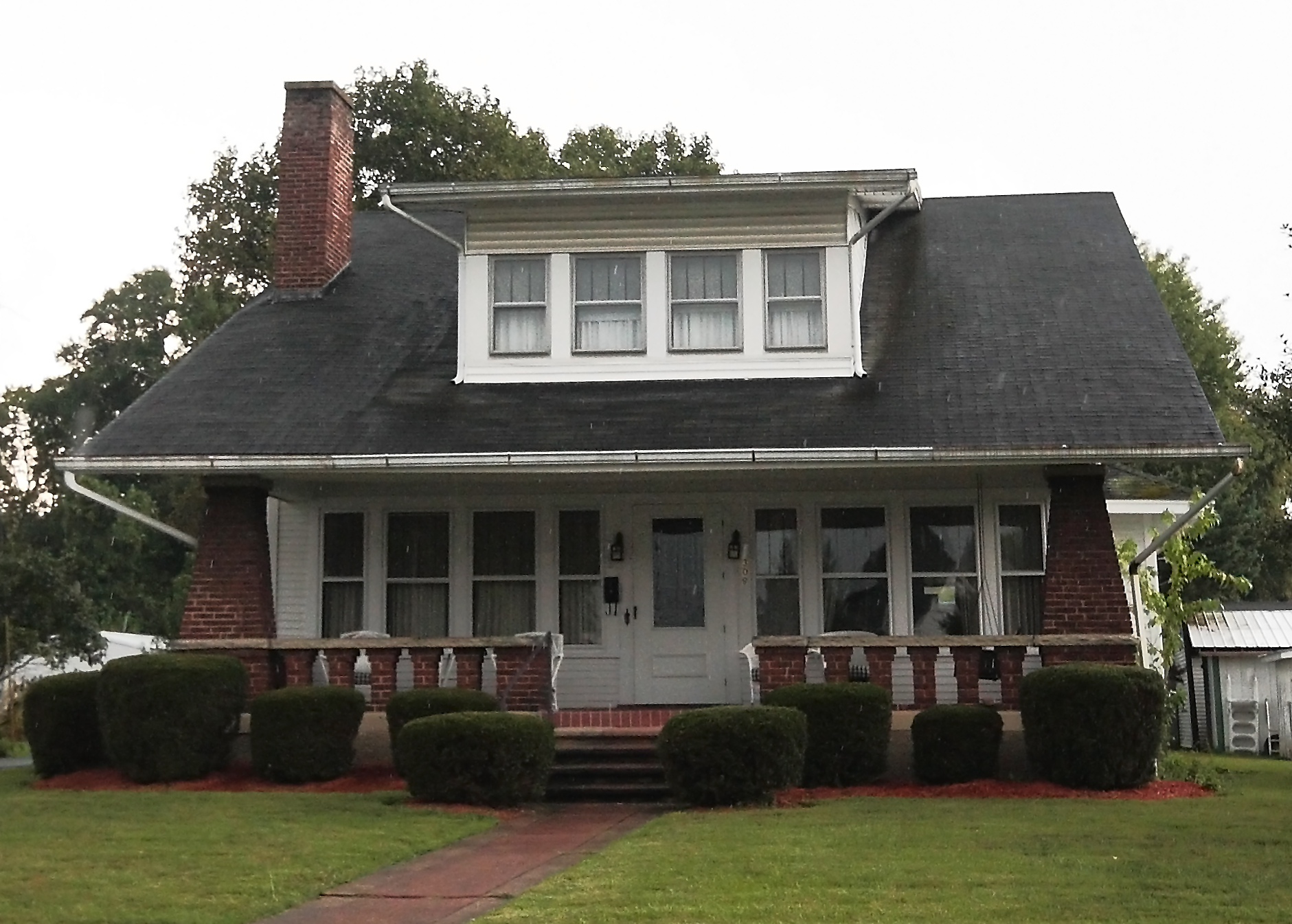

- Location within Kentucky Location within the United States
- Location: 308 Seminary Rd., Augusta, Kentucky
- Coordinates: 38°46′22″N 84°0′0″W
- Built: 1916–17
- Architectural style: Bungalow
- NRHP reference No.: 84001390
- Added to NRHP: May 22, 1984

The Brothers-O'Neil House is fully developed example of Bungalow architecture. The gable roof is pierced by a traditional roof dormer and exterior brick chimney on the south elevation. The front porch is supported by two large wire-cut brick columns. The foundation is concrete with a sandstone plinth. Side gables have a shingle wall treatment above the first floor, while the other walls have aluminum siding. The interior of the house comprises beamed ceilings and original woodwork.

The estate of Marie M. Marshall deeded this land to the Home Mission of the Presbyterian Church in 1916. An Augusta undertaker, L. M. Brothers, acquired the vacant parcel following the brief interim ownership of William Sayers, The house was built by Brothers' son-in-law, Leo G. O'Neil, during 1916 and 1917. Brothers deeded half interest in the house and property to O'Neil in 1917. Both families continued to live in the house. In 1922, as part of a divorce settlement, O'Neil deeded "the house and all claims of alimony and future support" to his former wife who sold the property in 1923 to Isaac Reynolds.
