= Augusta Ferry =

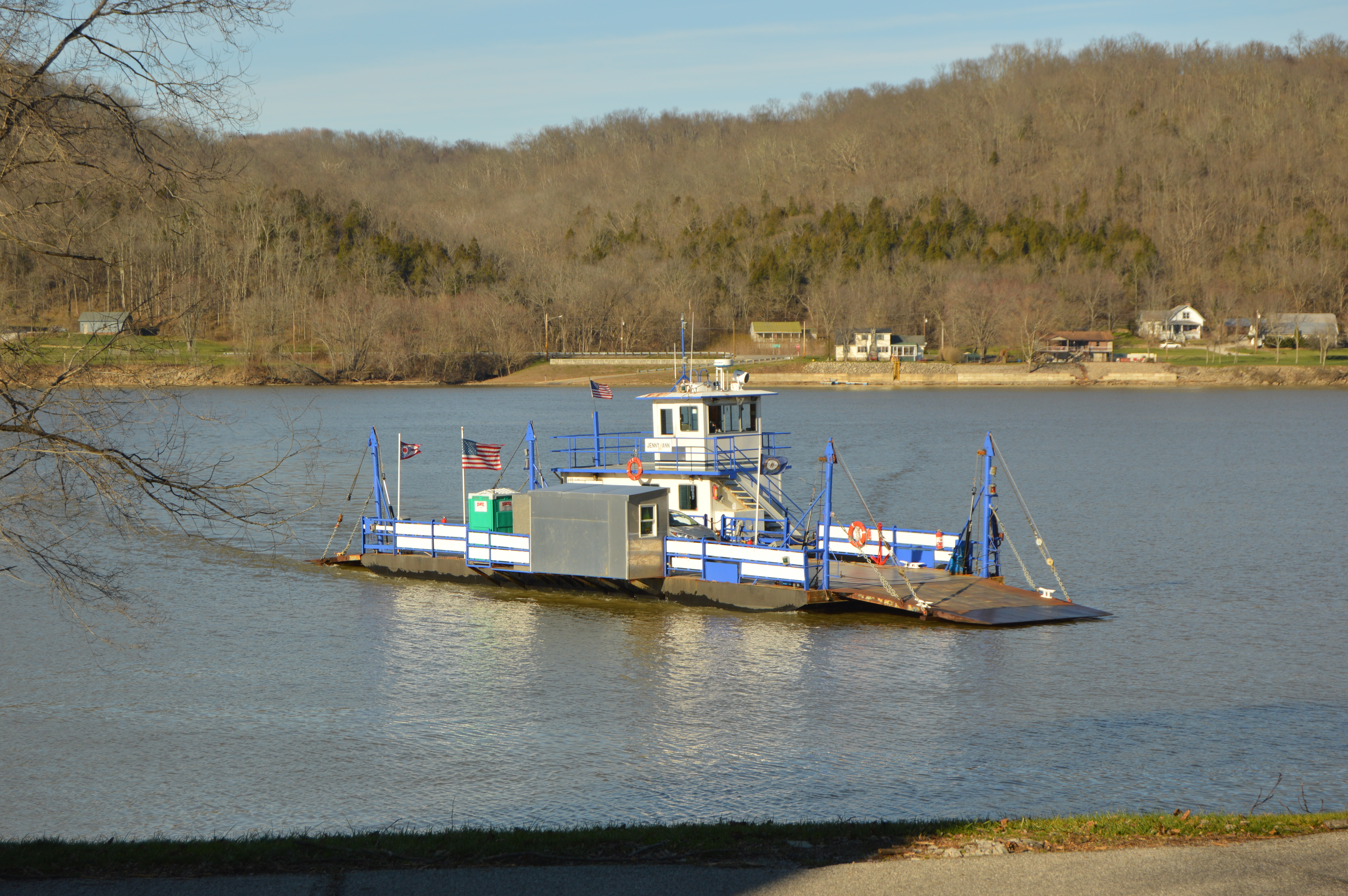
- Locale: Higginsport, Ohio and Augusta, Kentucky
- Waterway: Ohio River
- Transit type: Passenger ferry
- Operator: Augusta Ferry Authority
- Began operation: 1798
- No. of lines: 1
- No. of vessels: 1
- No. of terminals: 2

The Augusta Ferry is one of four passenger ferry services that cross the Ohio River into the U.S. state of Kentucky. It is operated by the Augusta Ferry Authority, and been in continuous operation since 1797 when the ferry was hand-propelled by John Boude. It connects the communities of Higginsport, Ohio and Augusta, Kentucky, and is the only public river crossing available between the Combs-Hehl Bridge at Cincinnati, Ohio and the William H. Harsha Bridge at Maysville, Kentucky.

== See also ==
- List of crossings of the Ohio River
