= Water Street District =

Water Street District may refer to:

- Water Street District (Dayton), a mixed-use development in Ohio
- Water Street District (Henderson, Nevada), a downtown district
- Water Street District (Lock Haven, Pennsylvania), a historic district

== See also ==
- Water Street Historic District (disambiguation)
