= Keith House (Austin, Texas) =

Historic house in Texas, United States

- U.S. National Register of Historic Places
- Recorded Texas Historic Landmark
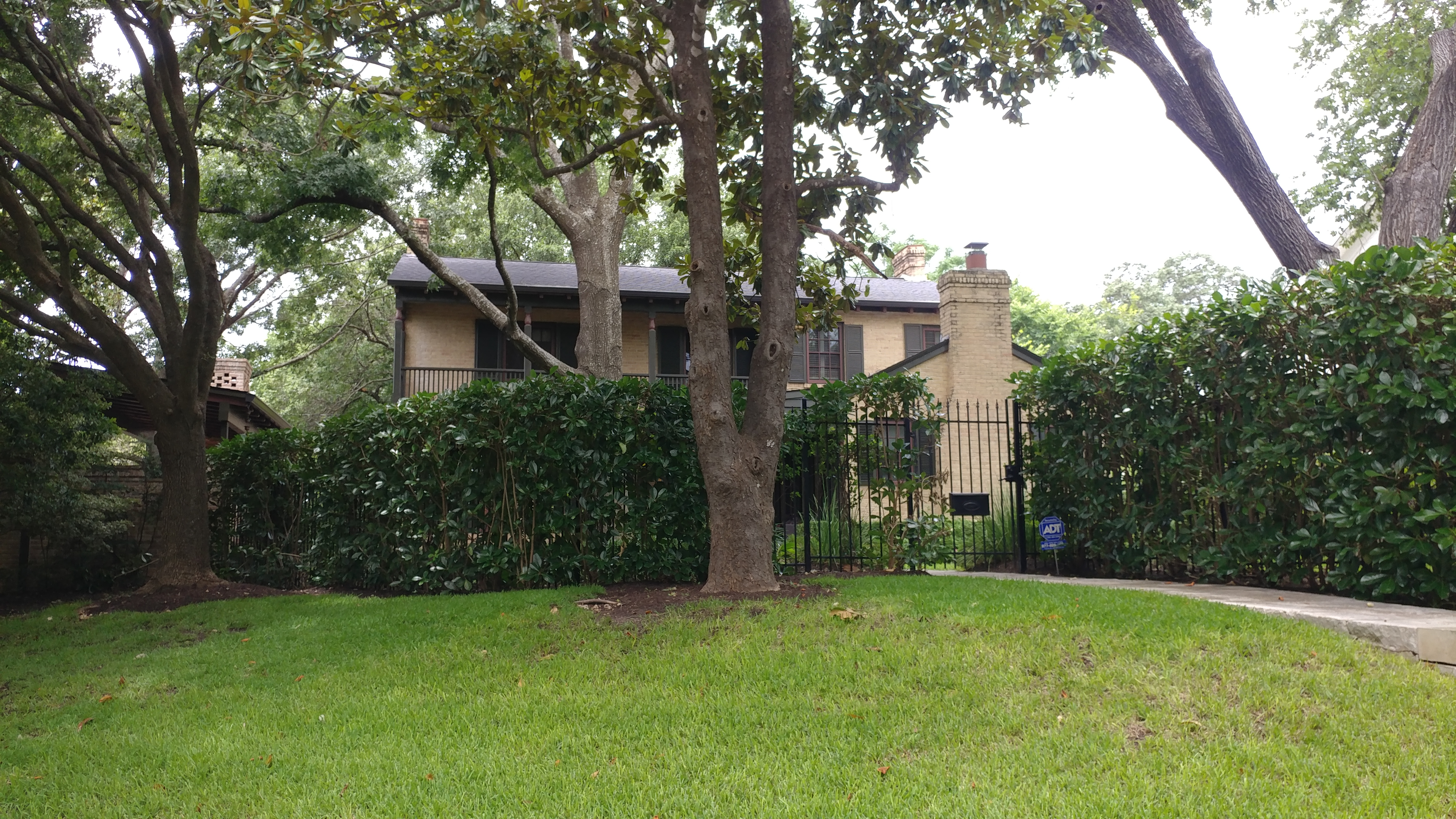
- Keith house, front view

- Location within Texas Location within the United States
- Location: 2400 Harris Blvd., Austin, Texas
- Coordinates: 30°17′28″N 97°45′25″W
- Built: 1933
- Built by: William Dixon Anderson
- Architectural style: Monterey
- NRHP reference No.: 98000448
- RTHL No.: 14569

Significant dates
- Added to NRHP: May 8, 1998
- Designated RTHL: 1994

The Keith House in Austin, Texas is a historic home in the Pemberton Heights neighborhood in central Austin.

The home was built in 1933 by local builder William Dixon Anderson for his sister, Maggie Mae Keith, and her husband, Jacque Nicholas Keith. It features elements of the Monterey Revival and Colonial Revival styles, popular at the time.

The home is located at 2400 Harris Blvd. It was added to the National Register of Historic Places in 1998.
