= Water Street Historic District (Augusta, Kentucky) =

Historic district in Kentucky, United States

- U.S. National Register of Historic Places
- U.S. Historic district
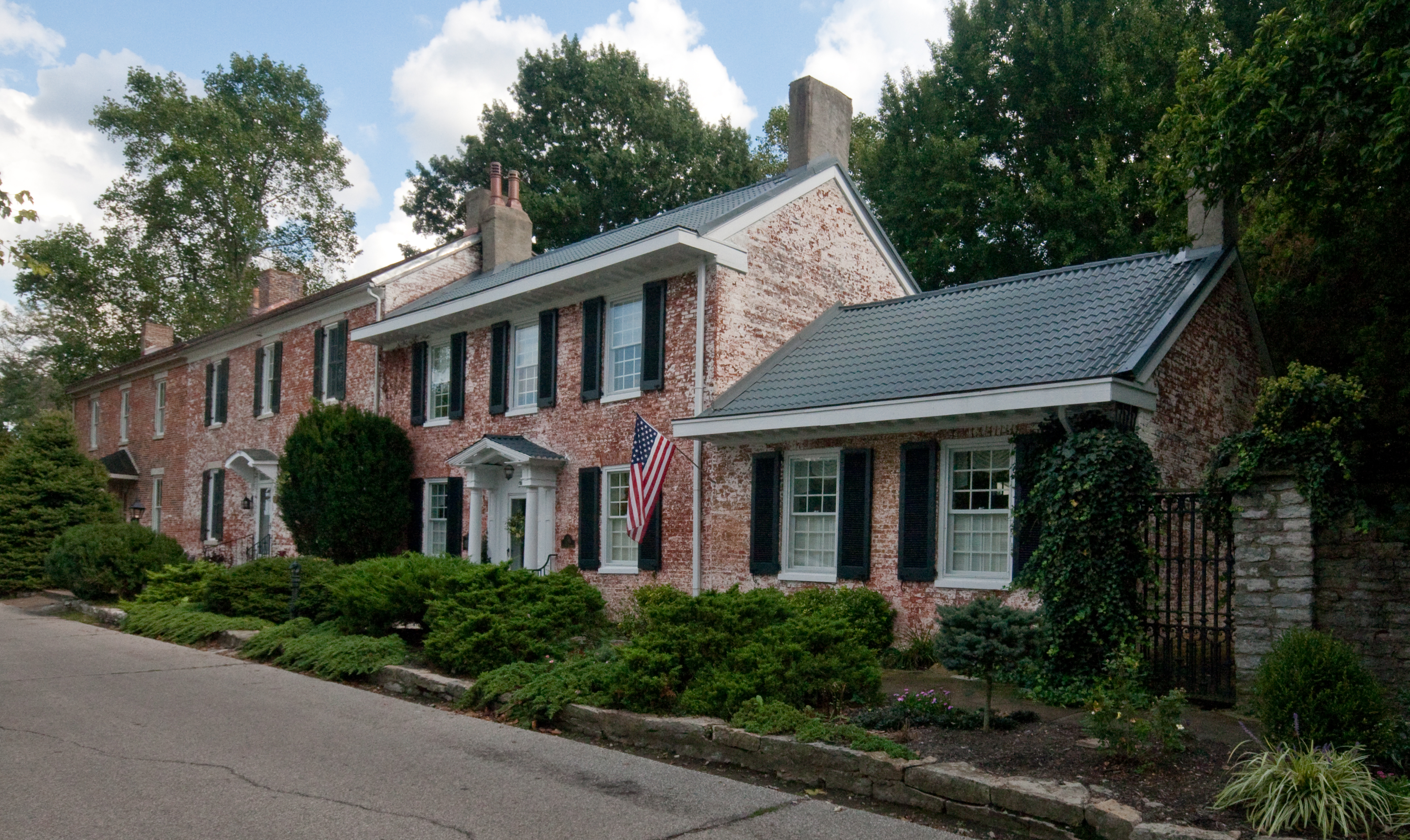

- Location within Kentucky Location within the United States
- Location: Augusta, Kentucky
- Coordinates: 38.7747°N 84.00804°W
- Architect: Multiple
- Architectural style: Second Empire, Italianate
- NRHP reference No.: 75000737
- Added to NRHP: September 24, 1975

The Water Street Historic District is a historic district in Augusta, Kentucky, on the National Register of Historic Places. Overlooking the Ohio River, the district includes River Side Drive east to Frankfort Street and west to Ferry Street. Houses in the district demonstrate a considerable range of late 18th-and early 19th-century residential architecture.

There are a number of Victorian era villas interspersed among the older houses with varied plans and elevations. The earlier symmetry or regularity is broken up with recessed porches, projecting gabled pavilions, and bay windows. Openings are typically taller and ornamented with hoodmolds and other trim.
