= Wells-Keith House =

Historic house in Kentucky, United States

- U.S. National Register of Historic Places
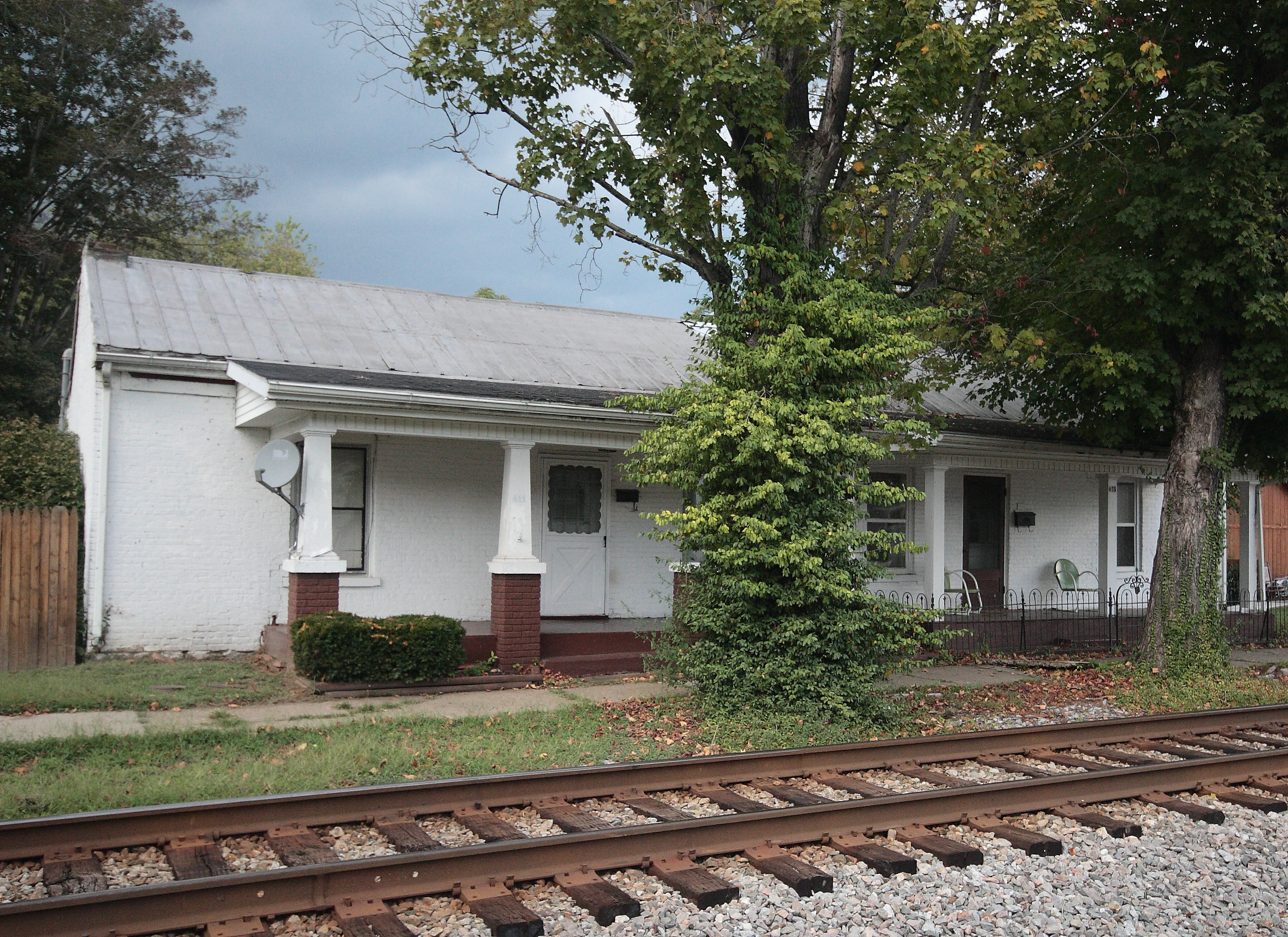

- Location within Kentucky Location within the United States
- Location: 411–413 3rd St., Augusta, Kentucky
- Coordinates: 38°46′24″N 84°0′5″W
- Built: 1858–1864
- Architectural style: Vernacular
- NRHP reference No.: 84001398
- Added to NRHP: May 22, 1984

The Wells-Keith House is the only single-story brick double house in Augusta. Both units have hall-parlor plans. The west unit may have been built first, based on chimney placement. The west gable features an end chimney while there is an absence of a chimney on the east gable. Stylistic details include common bond masonry, small two-over-two sash and sandstone lintels and sills.

Theodore Hamilton, former mayor of Augusta, conveyed lots 4 and 5 in Square 19 to Lewis B. Wells In 1858. Wells paid $575 for the property and sold it to Anderson D. Keith for $900 in 1864. Keith, a native of Virginia, was listed in the 1850 census as one of four Augusta physicians. The "house and lot" were deeded to Ann G. Keith in 1871.
