= Augusta Independent Schools =

School district in Kentucky, United States

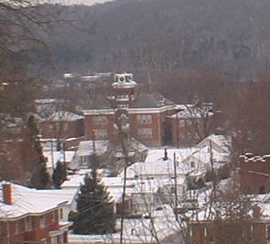

Location
- Augusta, Kentucky; United States

District information
- Type: Independent School District
- Motto: Small School. Big Experience.
- Grades: PreK-12
- Established: 1896
- Affiliation: Kentucky Department of Education

Other information
- Website: Official website

Augusta Independent Schools is a school district in Bracken County Kentucky, United States, which was founded in 1887. This district's schools are among the smallest in the state with all grades PreK-12 in one building.

== Schools ==
- Augusta Independent School

== Rankings ==
- Augusta Independent School is ranked #117 of 359 schools for athletes in Kentucky
- Augusta Independent School is ranked #149 of 244 schools for public high school teachers in Kentucky
- Augusta Independent School is ranked #198 of 311 schools for public middle school teachers in Kentucky
- The average math proficiency level is 32%
- The average reading proficiency level is 37%
- The average ACT score is 22
- The average Graduation Rate is 95%

== Student body ==
- There are on average 299 students attending Augusta Independent School
- The Student-Teacher ratio is 14:1 (the national is 17:1)
- Total minority enrollment is 4%. 1.7% of students are black, 1.7% students are Hispanic, 0.3% students are two or more races, and 96.2% students are White
- 46% students are female and 54% students are male.

== Sports ==
- Augusta Independent Schools have cross country, volleyball, archery, tennis, basketball, softball, baseball, and golf.

== History of Augusta Independent Schools ==
- The first school located in Augusta, Kentucky, was a private school built in 1795 built by Robert Schoolfield. It was a log cabin located at 211 Riverside Drive. Later on, leaders in the community established The Bracken Academy in 1798. To grow the school, they were awarded a charter and a grant of land from the state in 1799. To accommodate the growing need for education, they constructed several classroom buildings, including one classroom on the southeast corner of Elizabeth and Third Streets. In 1822 Bracken Academy combined with Augusta College. In 1825 it was fully operational and became the first established Methodist college in Kentucky (and the third in the nation at that time).
- Augusta Independent School was founded in 1873. In 1887, Augusta Free and Graded School was relocated to the Augusta College Building. The school officially took control of the building in the early 1890s and succeeded the college as the educating entity in the community. The current principal is Robin Kelsch, and the current superintendent is Lisa McCane.
