= Keith House (Little Rock, Arkansas) =

Historic house in Arkansas, United States

- U.S. National Register of Historic Places
- U.S. Historic district – Contributing property
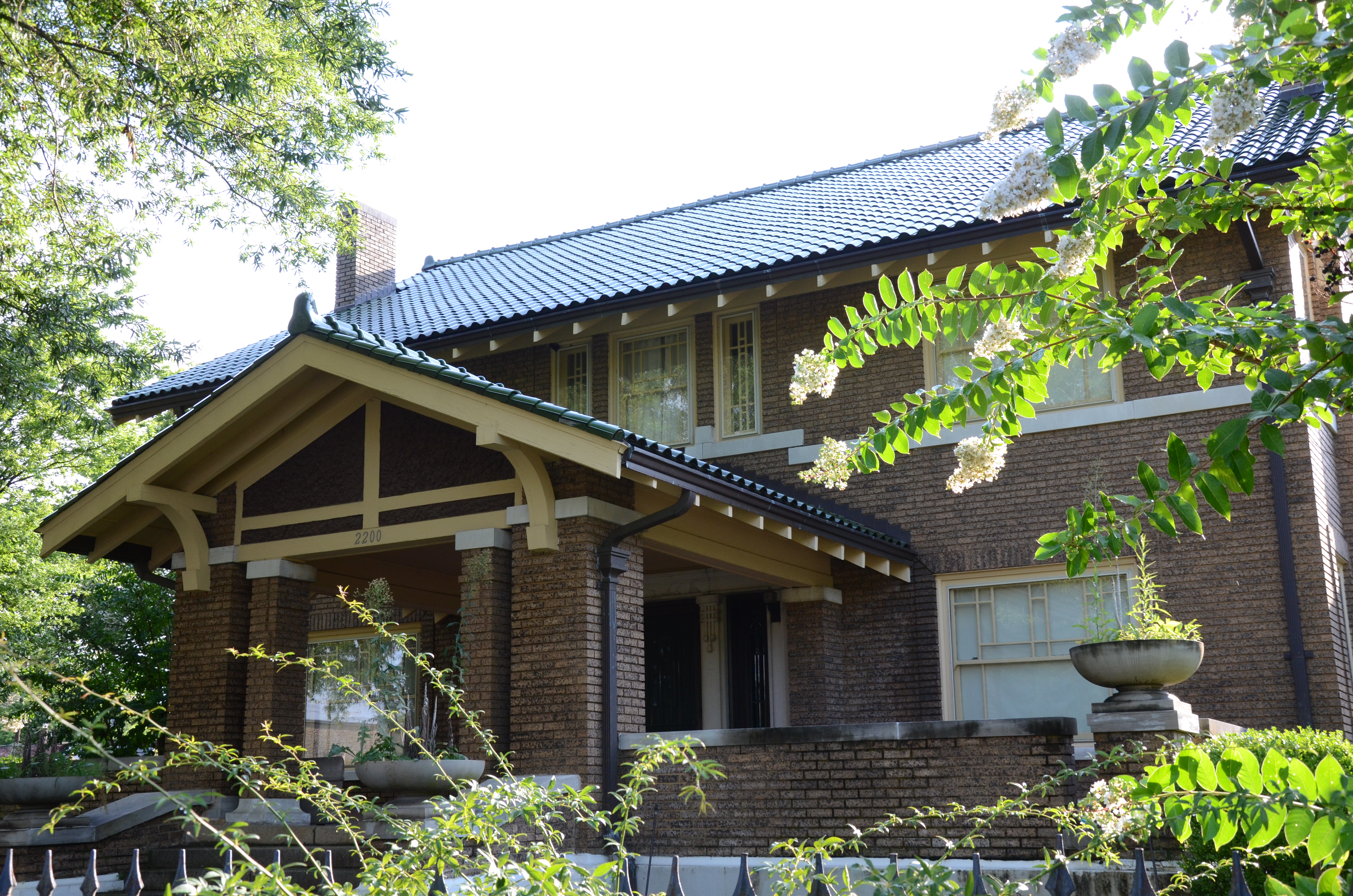

- Location within Arkansas Location within the United States
- Location: 2200 Broadway, Little Rock, Arkansas
- Coordinates: 34°43′38″N 92°16′43″W
- Built: 1912
- Architect: Charles L. Thompson
- Architectural style: Prairie School, Bungalow/Craftsman
- Part of: Governor's Mansion Historic District (1988 enlargement) (ID88000631)
- MPS: Thompson, Charles L., Design Collection TR
- NRHP reference No.: 82000905

Significant dates
- Added to NRHP: December 22, 1982
- Designated CP: May 19, 1988

The Keith House is a historic house at 2200 Broadway in Little Rock, Arkansas. It is a two-story brick structure, three bays wide, with a side-gable roof. A single-story gabled porch projects from the center of the main facade, supported by brick piers, with exposed rafter ends and large Craftsman brackets. The house was designed by noted Arkansas architect Charles L. Thompson and built in 1912. It is a particularly well-executed combination of Craftsman and Prairie School features.

The house was listed on the National Register of Historic Places in 1982.

== See also ==
- National Register of Historic Places listings in Little Rock, Arkansas
