= Foster, Kentucky =

Unincorporated community in Kentucky, United States

Foster
- Unincorporated community
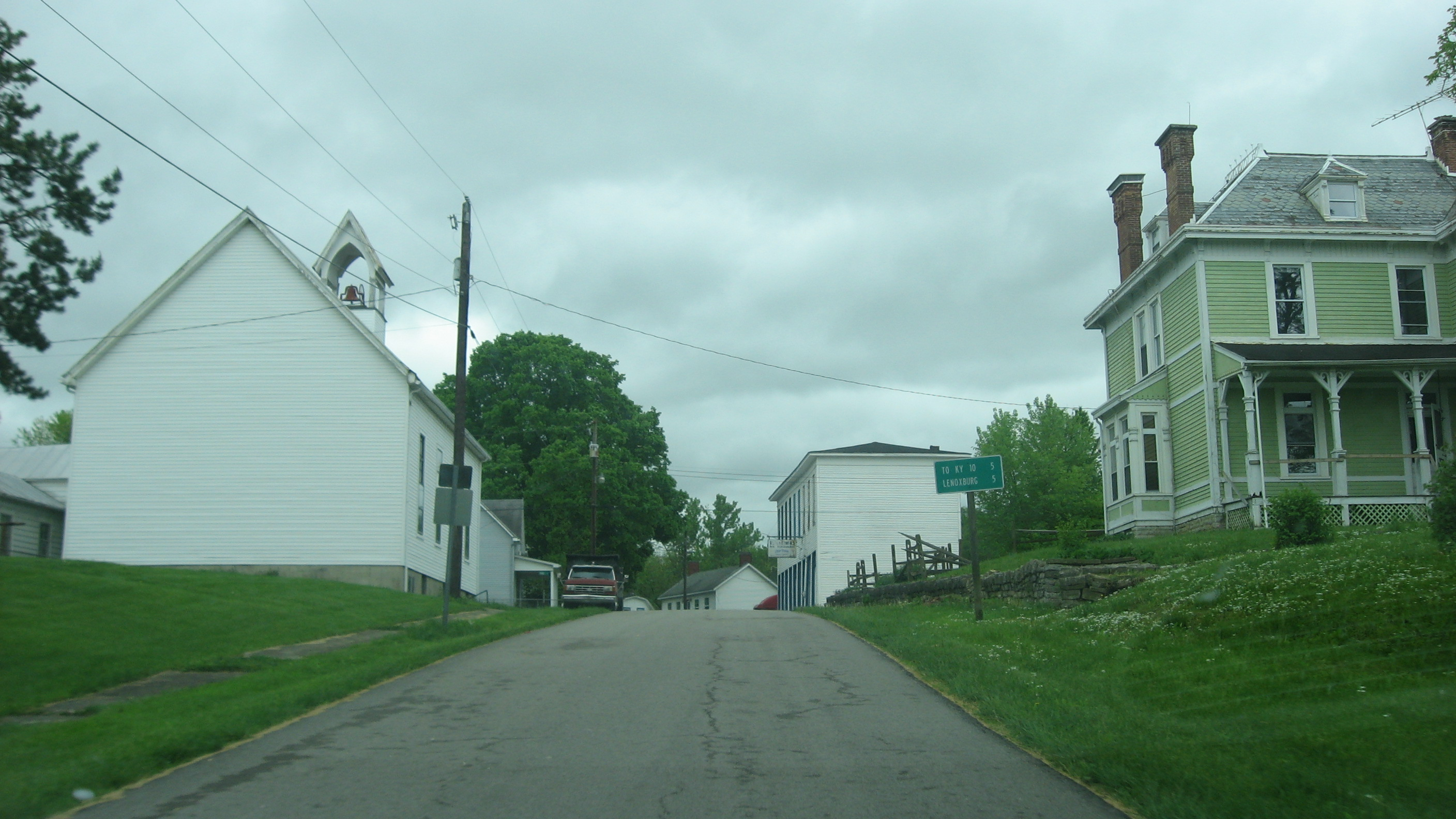
- Lenoxburg-Foster Road

- Location within the state of Kentucky Foster (the United States)
- Coordinates: 38°47′57″N 84°12′47″W
- Country: United States
- State: Kentucky
- County: Bracken

Area
  - Total: 0.098 sq mi (0.25 km^{2})
  - Land: 0.098 sq mi (0.25 km^{2})
  - Water: 0 sq mi (0 km^{2})
- Elevation: 528 ft (161 m)

Population (2010)
  - Total: 44
  - Density: 450/sq mi (170/km^{2})
- Time zone: UTC-5 (Eastern (EST))
  - Summer (DST): UTC-4 (EDT)
- ZIP codes: 41043
- GNIS feature ID: 517057

Foster (also known as Fosters) is an unincorporated community located in Bracken County, Kentucky, United States. Its population was 44 as of the 2010 census, which recorded it as a city; although Foster was once incorporated, it had become unincorporated by 2008.

== History ==
Foster has the name of pioneer citizen Israel Foster. Variant names have been "Fosters Landing" and "Fosters". A post office called Foster's Landing was established in 1847, and the name was changed to Foster in 1850.
