= Augusta College (Kentucky) =

From 1822 to 1849, Augusta College was located in Augusta, Kentucky in Bracken County. It was formed when the Bracken Academy and Methodist churches of Ohio and Kentucky joined. Augusta College was the third Methodist college founded in the United States. Its first president was Martin Ruter, D.D. It usually had enrollment of about 175–305 pupils. The college grounds are occupied by the Augusta Independent Schools District.

== Notable alumni and faculty ==
- Henry Bidleman Bascom (1796–1850), religious circuit rider, U.S. Congressional Chaplain, Methodist Bishop, professor at Augusta College, college president, editor
- James H. Brown (1818–1900), Justice of the West Virginia Supreme Court
- Orville Hickman Browning (1806–1881), member of the United States Senate from Illinois; United States Secretary of the Interior
- Alexander William Doniphan (1808–1887), was a 19th-century American attorney, soldier and politician from Missouri who is best known today as the man who prevented the summary execution of Joseph Smith, founder of the Church of Jesus Christ of Latter-day Saints.
- John Price Durbin (1800–1876), Chaplain of the Senate, President of Dickinson College
- John Gregg Fee (1816–1901), abolitionist and founder of Berea College
- Edward J. Gay (1816–1889) and Edward White Robertson (1823–1887), both of whom went on to become United States representatives from Louisiana
- Randolph S. Foster, minister and later president of Northwestern University (IL) and Drew University (NJ)
- John Miley, professor of theology at Drew University
- Charles Clark, 24th Governor of Mississippi.
- Selucius Garfielde (1822–1883), Territorial Delegate to Congress from Washington Territory
- Bela M. Hughes (1817–1902), Lawyer and Colorado pioneer
- Charles S. Lewis (1821–1878), U.S. Representative from Virginia
- Francis Asbury Morris (1817–1881), Attorney General of the Republic of Texas and circuit riding minister.
- Elijah Phister, U.S. Congressman from Kentucky
- William H. Wadsworth, U.S. Congressman from Kentucky
- Waitman T. Willey (1811–1900), U.S. Senator from West Virginia

== See also ==
- Category:Augusta College (Kentucky) alumni

== Bibliography ==
- Poore, Benjamin Perley (1871). Congressional Directory for the Third Session of the Forty-First United States Congress of the United States of America. 2d ed. Washington, D.C.: Government Printing Office.
