= Augusta, Kentucky =

- City
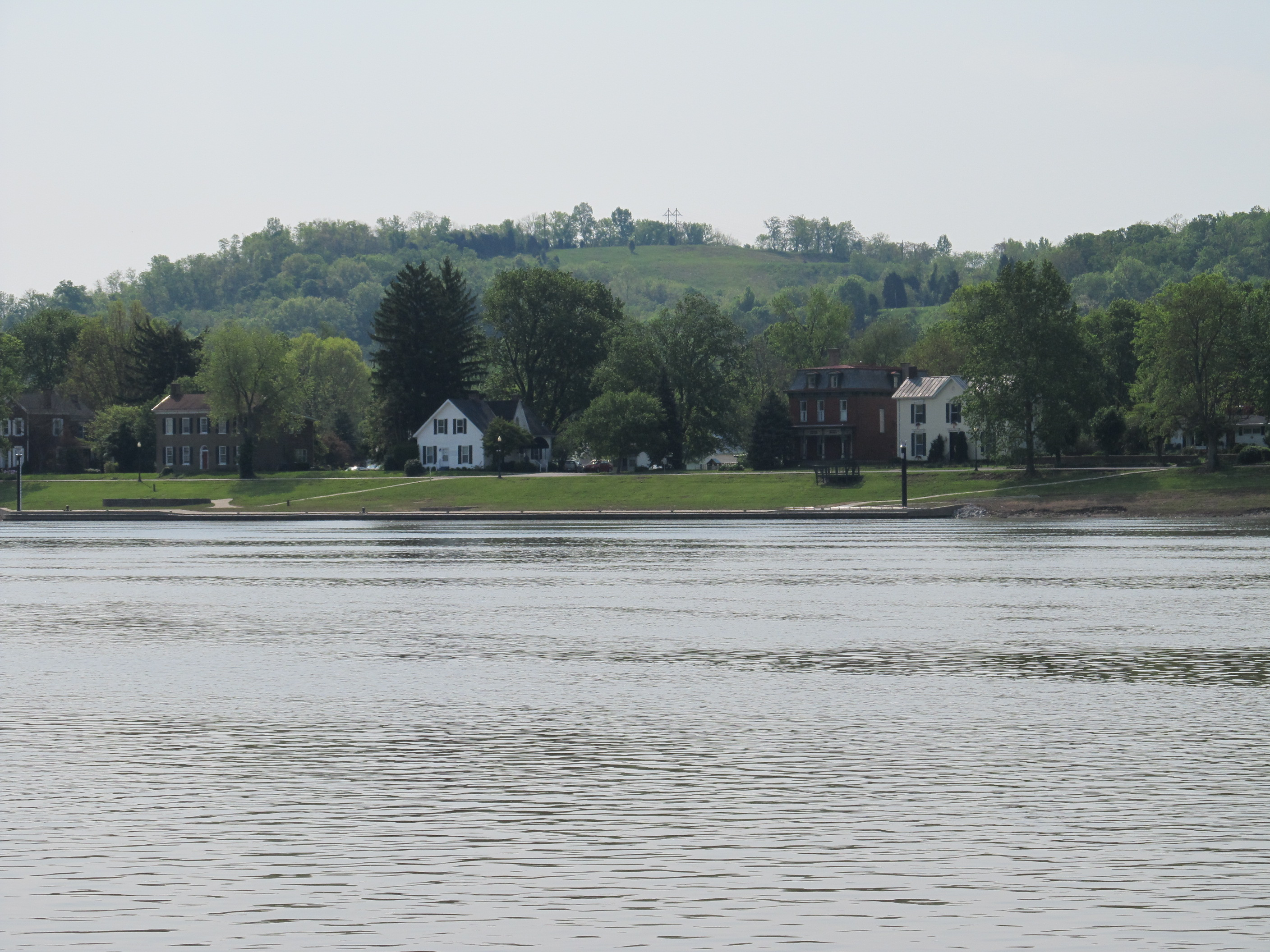
- Houses along the Ohio River in Augusta

- Flag Logo

- Location of Augusta in Bracken County, Kentucky.

- Location within the state of Kentucky Augusta (the United States) Augusta (North America)
- Coordinates: 38°46′18″N 84°00′00″W
- Country: United States
- State: Kentucky
- County: Bracken
- Named for: Augusta County, Virginia

Government
  - Mayor: John Laycock 2023-present)

Area
  - Total: 1.62 sq mi (4.19 km^{2})
  - Land: 1.19 sq mi (3.08 km^{2})
  - Water: 0.43 sq mi (1.11 km^{2}) 26.67%
- Elevation: 518 ft (158 m)

Population (2020)
  - Total: 1,096
  - Density: 920.8/sq mi (355.51/km^{2})
- Time zone: UTC-5 (EST)
  - Summer (DST): UTC-4 (EDT)
- ZIP code: 41002
- Area code: 606
- FIPS code: 21-02674
- GNIS feature ID: 2403138
- Website: www.augustaky.gov

Augusta is a home rule-class city in Bracken County, Kentucky, in the United States. It is located upon the southern bank of the Ohio River. As of the 2020 census, the city population was 1,096. When Bracken County was organized in 1796, Augusta was the county seat. In 1839, a new county courthouse was built at a more central location in Brooksville. The city was formally incorporated by the state assembly in 1850.

== Geography ==
Augusta is located in northeastern Kentucky. Kentucky Route 8 (Fifth Street) is the main road through the city. Route 8 leads northwest 42 miles (68 km) to downtown Cincinnati and southeast 19 miles (31 km) to Maysville. The Augusta Ferry crosses the Ohio River into Lewis Township, Brown County, Ohio, near Higginsport.

According to the United States Census Bureau, Augusta has a total area of 1.6 square miles (4.2 km^{2}), of which 1.4 square miles (3.5 km^{2}) is land and 0.27 square miles (0.7 km^{2}), or 16.6%, is water.

== Climate ==
The climate in this area is characterized by hot, humid summers and generally mild to cool winters. According to the Köppen Climate Classification system, Augusta has a humid subtropical climate, abbreviated "Cfa" on climate maps.

== Demographics ==
Historical population
Census	Pop.	Note	%±
1800	143		—
1810	225		57.3%
1830	687		—
1840	786		14.4%
1850	588		−25.2%
1860	693		17.9%
1870	960		38.5%
1880	1,282		33.5%
1890	1,447		12.9%
1900	1,718		18.7%
1910	1,787		4.0%
1920	1,829		2.4%
1930	1,675		−8.4%
1940	1,701		1.6%
1950	1,599		−6.0%
1960	1,458		−8.8%
1970	1,434		−1.6%
1980	1,455		1.5%
1990	1,336		−8.2%
2000	1,204		−9.9%
2010	1,190		−1.2%
2020	1,096		−7.9%
U.S. Decennial Census

As of the census of 2005, there were 1,204 people, 534 households, and 330 families residing in the city. The population density was 990.9 inhabitants per square mile (382.6/km^{2}). There were 605 housing units at an average density of 497.9 per square mile (192.2/km^{2}). The racial makeup of the city was 97.51% White, 1.25% African American, 0.17% Pacific Islander, 0.33% from other races, and 0.75% from two or more races. Hispanic or Latino of any race were 0.58% of the population.

There were 534 households, out of which 28.8% had children under the age of 18 living with them, 43.4% were married couples living together, 14.6% had a female householder with no husband present, and 38.2% were non-families. 34.6% of all households were made up of individuals, and 14.2% had someone living alone who was 65 years of age or older. The average household size was 2.25 and the average family size was 2.88.

In the city the population was spread out, with 23.6% under the age of 18, 8.5% from 18 to 24, 27.3% from 25 to 44, 24.5% from 45 to 64, and 16.1% who were 65 years of age or older. The median age was 38 years. For every 100 females, there were 94.2 males. For every 100 females age 18 and over, there were 85.9 males.

The median income for a household in the city was $28,333, and the median income for a family was $34,167. Males had a median income of $27,500 versus $22,188 for females. The per capita income for the city was $14,450. About 15.4% of families and 16.8% of the population were below the poverty line, including 18.9% of those under age 18 and 18.5% of those age 65 or over.

== History ==
Augusta was founded by Philip Buckner in 1786 as a trading post along the Ohio River. The city was named after Augusta County, Virginia. The city grew quickly and in 1796 became county seat of the new Bracken County. The county seat was moved to Oxford, then back to Augusta, then finally to Brooksville in 1839.

In 1862, Confederate Colonel Basil W. Duke attacked the town as part of the Kentucky Campaign. While he was able to drive off a pair of Union gunboats in the Ohio River and defeat the local Unionist militia in house-to-house fighting, heavy losses forced him to abandon plans to cross into Ohio.

The city was home to five separate schools, one private and four public. The most famous built was the Augusta College, which served the entire Bracken area until 1887 when the high school was moved into that location.

== Government ==
The city of Augusta is classified as a Class 4 city. Augusta is headed by the mayor and a City Council with six members and an attorney that preside at the meetings. After inauguration, the Mayor selects his Vice Mayor who remains in that post until the next mayor is elected. There is no limit to the number of terms either the Mayor or the City Council can serve.

The city also has a Police Department, Fire Department, County Ambulance Department, Maintenance Department, and a Water Treatment Department.

== Industry ==
Augusta is home to a Berry Global manufacturing facility that makes plastic films.

Augusta is home to Augusta Distillery maker of World Famous Buckner Kentucky Bourbon.

== Education ==
The public schools, Augusta Elementary School and Augusta High School, are managed by the Augusta Independent Schools school district. The district was founded in the 1850s. The first school was located on the upper floor of the city jail. In 1873, a building was built on the northeast corner of Seminary and Third Street. In 1887, the school moved to the Augusta College campus at Third and Bracken Streets. Lisa McCane is current the Superintendent of Schools.

== Augusta mayors ==
- John Laycock (January 1, 2023–present)
- Mike Taylor (January 1, 2019–December 31, 2022)
- Wendell High (February 15, 2017–December 31, 2018), named interim Mayor
- Mary H. Zeigler (January 1, 2015–February 15, 2017), first female Mayor in City history.
- John Laycock (June 12, 2009–December 31, 2014), named interim Mayor upon High's resignation; Reelected in 2010.
- Wendell High (January 1, 2007–June 12, 2009), the first mayor to win two nonconsecutive terms in office
- John Laycock (January 1, 2003–December 31, 2006), elected with 65% of the votes; first person to win a public office in the Commonwealth of Kentucky as a "write-in"
- Wendell High (January 1, 1999– December 31, 2002)
- Louis Habermehl Jr. (July 1992–December 31, 1998), named interim Mayor; reelected.
- Mike Bach (January 1, 1990–July 1992)
- Isaac Weldon (January 1, 1986–December 31, 1989)
- Thomas Appelman (March 19, 1970–December 31, 1985)
- U. McCall Richey (January 1, 1970-March 19, 1970)
- Easton F. Meyer (September 16, 1966-December 31, 1970)

== Notable people ==
The high school carillon in Augusta is dedicated to Rosemary Clooney.

- Henry Bidleman Bascom (1796–1850), religious circuit rider, U.S. Congressional Chaplain, professor at Augusta College, college president, editor
- George Clooney, graduated from Augusta High School
- Nick Clooney, American television journalist, anchorman, game show and American Movie Classics host
- Rosemary Clooney purchased a getaway home on the river in 1980.
- John Gregg Fee, alumnus of Augusta College, noted abolitionist in Kentucky
- Heather French, former Miss America, born in Augusta
- Don Galloway, actor from TV series Ironside
- William Henry Harrison stayed at General John Payne's home on Riverside Drive, on his way to be inaugurated.
- Buckner Stith Morris, second mayor of Chicago

== See also ==
- List of cities and towns along the Ohio River
- Rosemary Clooney Museum, Riverside Drive, Augusta
