= National Register of Historic Places listings in Livingston County, Kentucky =

Location of Livingston County in Kentucky

This is a list of the National Register of Historic Places listings in Livingston County, Kentucky.

It is intended to be a complete list of the properties on the National Register of Historic Places in Livingston County, Kentucky, United States. The locations of National Register properties for which the latitude and longitude coordinates are included below, may be seen in a map.

There are 7 properties listed on the National Register in the county.

This National Park Service list is complete through NPS recent listings posted December 12, 2025.

== Current listings ==
	Name on the Register	Image	Date listed	Location	City or town	Description
1	Fort Star	Fort Star	August 13, 1998 (#98000938)	0.3 miles south of Smithland; 37°08′02″N 88°24′05″W	Smithland	
2	Gower House	Gower House	May 24, 1973 (#73000815)	Water St. 37°08′35″N 88°24′20″W	Smithland	
3	Kentucky Hydroelectric Project	Kentucky Hydroelectric Project	August 11, 2017 (#100001456)	640 Kentucky Dam Rd. 37°00′48″N 88°16′08″W	Grand Rivers	Extends into Marshall County
4	Thomas Lawson House	Thomas Lawson House	July 12, 1978 (#78001378)	Wabash Ave. 37°00′14″N 88°14′11″W	Grand Rivers	
5	Livingston County Courthouse and Clerk's Offices	Livingston County Courthouse and Clerk's Offices	November 10, 2011 (#11000794)	351 Court St. 37°08′22″N 88°24′16″W	Smithland	
6	Mantle Rock Archeological District	Mantle Rock Archeological District	November 26, 2004 (#04001253)	Kentucky Route 133; 37°21′10″N 88°25′41″W	Smithland	
7	Masonic Hall-Federal Commissary Building	Masonic Hall-Federal Commissary Building	August 13, 1998 (#98000939)	Junction of Court and Charlotte Sts. 37°08′25″N 88°24′24″W	Smithland	
8	Richard Olive House	Richard Olive House	April 29, 1982 (#82002732)	Court St. 37°08′22″N 88°24′15″W	Smithland	

== See also ==
- List of National Historic Landmarks in Kentucky
- National Register of Historic Places listings in Kentucky
