= National Register of Historic Places listings in Crittenden County, Kentucky =

Location of Crittenden County in Kentucky

This is a list of the National Register of Historic Places listings in Crittenden County, Kentucky.

It is intended to be a complete list of the properties on the National Register of Historic Places in Crittenden County, Kentucky, United States. The locations of National Register properties for which the latitude and longitude coordinates are included below, may be seen in a map.

There are 3 properties listed on the National Register in the county.

This National Park Service list is complete through NPS recent listings posted March 21, 2025.

== Current listings ==
	Name on the Register	Image	Date listed	Location	City or town	Description
1	Fohs Hall	Fohs Hall	April 29, 1982 (#82002682)	143 N. Walker St. 37°20′03″N 88°04′43″W	Marion	
2	Frances School Gymnasium	Frances School Gymnasium	March 1, 1993 (#93000046)	100 Elementary Circle; 37°13′06″N 88°08′38″W	Marion	
3	Weston Bluff Skirmish Site	Weston Bluff Skirmish Site	August 13, 1998 (#98000937)	Along the Ohio River north of Weston; 37°28′29″N 88°04′24″W	Weston	

== See also ==
- List of National Historic Landmarks in Kentucky
- National Register of Historic Places listings in Kentucky
