= Frances School Gymnasium =

- U.S. National Register of Historic Places
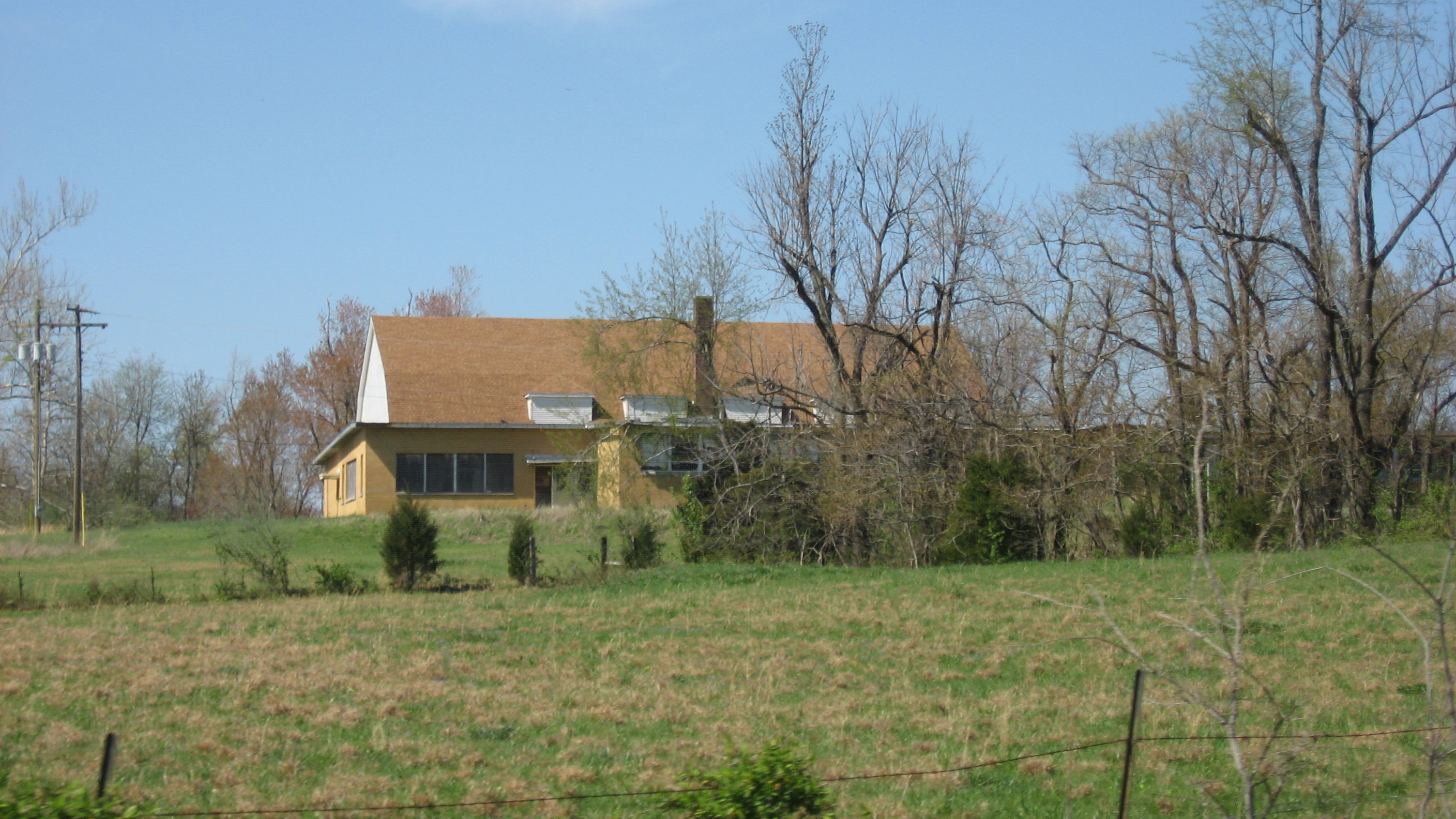

- Location within Kentucky Location within the United States
- Location: 100 Elementary Circle, Marion, Kentucky
- Coordinates: 37.218333°N 88.143889°W
- Area: 9 acres (3.6 ha)
- Built: 1938
- MPS: New Deal Era Construction in Kentucky MRA
- NRHP reference No.: 93000046
- Added to NRHP: March 1, 1993

The Frances School Gymnasium in Marion, Kentucky was built in 1938 as a New Deal era construction employment project. It was listed on the National Register of Historic Places in 1993.

The gym is a one-story gambrel roofed structure with both balloon frame and steel beam support. It is 102 by 60 feet (31 m × 18 m) in plan and sits on a poured concrete foundation. It is adjacent to a one-story brick school building built in about 1960.

It was listed on the National Register along with other New Deal projects covered in one study.

Its NRHP registration asserts:

The gymnasium is a good local example of the education building property type defined by the context. The structure, constructed in 1938, is important for showing that recreation for children was given a priority in the rural school experience. The gym is also important for documenting the partnership between school and community because it provided space for various community activities, within the framework prescribed by the Works Progress Administration (WPA). This structure also is important for indicating Crittenden County's attitude during the late 1930s to school consolidation. Because the structure blends a variety of uses (educational, social, recreational, cultural) it is an important reflection of New Deal program goals, that projects would serve the public good broadly.
