= Witch Child of Pilot's Knob =

Kentuckian urban legend

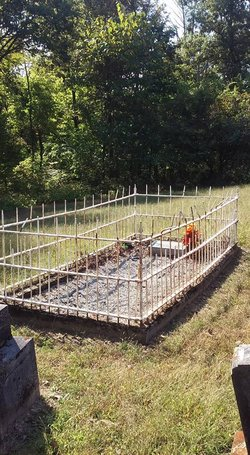
The grave of Mary Evelyn Ford

The Witch Child of Pilot's Knob is an urban legend from Kentucky, United States. It tells of a five-year-old girl named Mary Evelyn Ford and her mother, Mary Louise Ford, being burned at the stake in the 1900s for practicing witchcraft in the town of Marion, Kentucky. The story has no basis in fact.

== Folklore ==
The legend goes that Mary Evelyn Ford and Mary Louise Ford where both accused of witchcraft in the town of Marion. Instead of charging them through the court system, the townsfolk decided to burn them at the stake. Mary Louise's body was taken somewhere and buried far away from Marion and Mary Evelyn's body was buried in the town Pilot's Knob, Kentucky. The townsfolk buried Mary Evelyn in Pilot Knob Cemetery in a steel lined grave, covered her casket in concrete and gravel, and surrounded her grave with an interconnected fence of crosses out of fear that she would rise from the dead to take revenge.

== Mythos ==
It is said that Mary Evelyn's spirit cannot pass the fence around her grave, but she can pull people down into it if they get near enough, and she tries to taunt people into coming closer. It is also said that there is a dark spirit outside of her grave's fence called "The Watcher" who is said to haunt Pilot Knob Cemetery and seems to be attempting to claim the girl's soul, but cannot get her through the fence, he waits to claim the girl's soul and will chase off anyone in the cemetery.

== History ==
Mary Evelyn Ford (1911–1916) was the daughter of J.A. and Rebecca Ford; her mother's name was not "Mary Louise". Mary Evelyn died of peritonitis. Her obituary was published in the Crittenden Record-Press. Rebecca (1869–1955) lived a long life, outliving her youngest daughter by almost 40 years. Neither Mary Evelyn nor Rebecca were burned at the stake or accused of witchcraft.

In 2009, members of the Ford family spoke out to dispel the urban legend.
