= National Register of Historic Places listings in Clay County, Kentucky =

Historic places in Clay County, Kentucky

Location of Clay County in Kentucky

This is a list of the National Register of Historic Places listings in Clay County, Kentucky.

It is intended to be a complete list of the properties on the National Register of Historic Places in Clay County, Kentucky, United States. The locations of National Register properties for which the latitude and longitude coordinates are included below, may be seen in a map.

There are 5 properties listed on the National Register in the county. Another property was once listed but has been removed.

This National Park Service list is complete through NPS recent listings posted December 12, 2025.

== Current listings ==
	Name on the Register	Image	Date listed	Location	City or town	Description
1	Fish Trap Rock Petroglyphs (15CY53)	Fish Trap Rock Petroglyphs (15CY53)	September 8, 1989 (#89001181)	Western bank of the Red Bird River at the Hal Rogers Parkway crossing 37°10′25″N 83°35′21″W	Eriline	
2	Manchester Historic District		April 26, 2023 (#100008883)	Portions of Main, Bridge, and Lawyer Sts., Town Sq., Richmond Rd./US 421/White St. 37°09′23″N 83°45′39″W	Manchester	
3	Peabody-Fordson Historic District	Peabody-Fordson Historic District	February 1, 2017 (#89002099)	Kentucky Route 66, south of Big Creek; 37°08′20″N 83°35′24″W	Big Creek	
4	Red Bird River Shelter Petroglyphs (15CY52)		September 8, 1989 (#89001183)	Address Restricted	Manchester	
5	Sullen Possum Site		October 6, 1993 (#93000996)	Address Restricted	Oneida	

== Former listing ==
	Name on the Register	Image	Date listed	Date removed	Location	City or town	Description
1	Red Bird River Petroglyphs (15CY51)	Red Bird River Petroglyphs (15CY51)	September 8, 1989 (#89001182)	December 4, 2003	Address Restricted	Manchester	On December 7, 1994, the 50-ton stone bearing the petroglyphs fell from a sandstone cliff above the Red Bird River, onto Kentucky Route 66 at Lower Red Bird. On December 9, 1994, it was transported to its present location in Rawlings/Stinson Park in Manchester, where it is roofed over and fenced.

== See also ==
- List of National Historic Landmarks in Kentucky
- National Register of Historic Places listings in Kentucky
