= Weston Bluff Skirmish Site =

- U.S. National Register of Historic Places
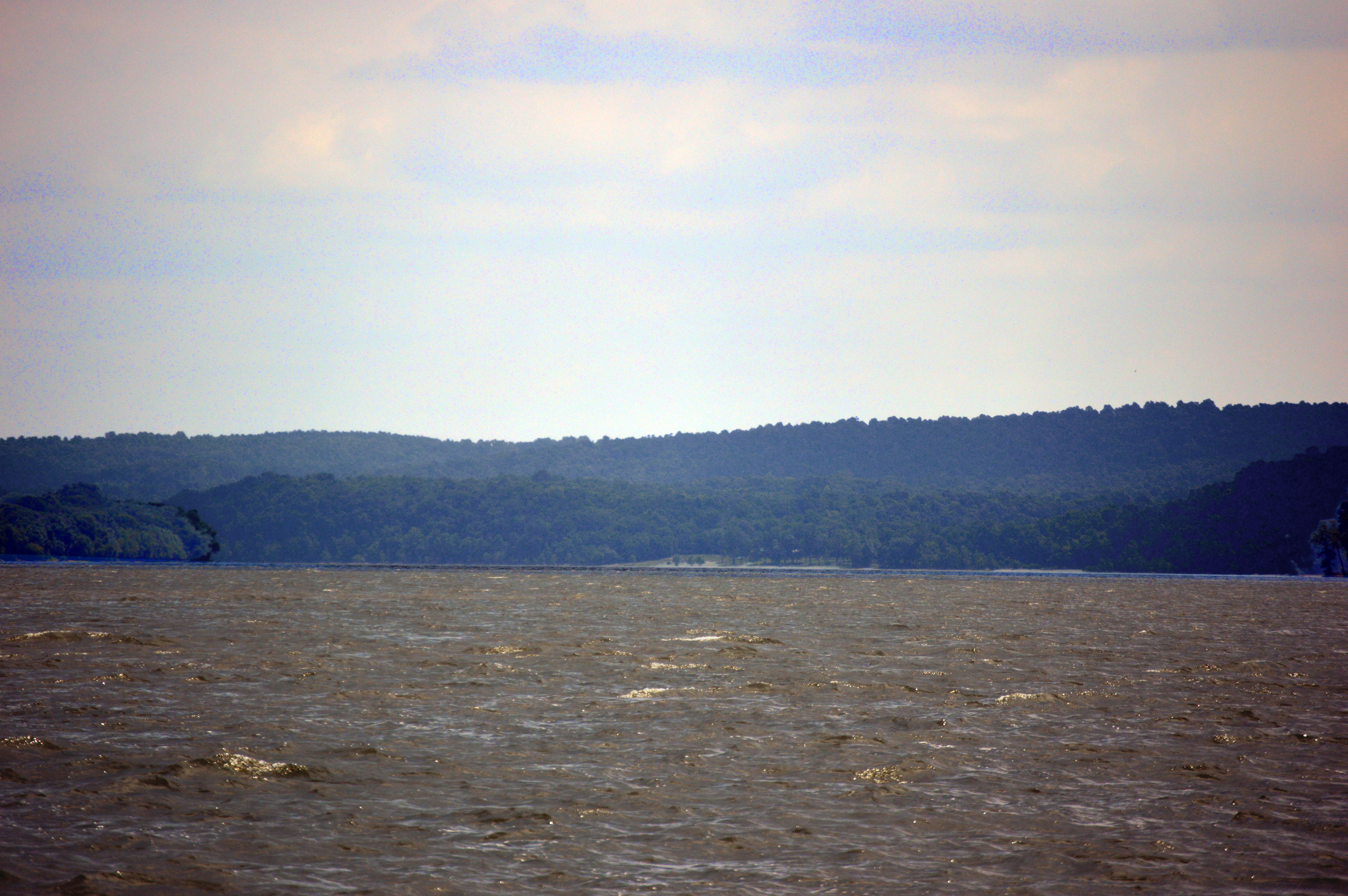
- Weston from the ferry

- Location within Kentucky Location within the United States
- Location: Along Ohio River north of Weston, Kentucky
- Coordinates: 37.474722°N 88.073444°W
- Area: 10 acres (4.0 ha)
- MPS: Caught in the Middle: The Civil War on the Lower Ohio River MPS
- NRHP reference No.: 98000937
- Added to NRHP: August 13, 1998

The Weston Bluff Skirmish Site, on a bluff over the Ohio River just north of Weston, Kentucky, was site of an American Civil War skirmish on June 21, 1864. A 10 acres (4.0 ha) area was listed on the National Register of Historic Places in 1998.

Confederate soldiers shot at boats at Weston; Union soldiers shot back. While minor, the skirmish was the largest military action in Crittenden County, Kentucky during the war.

It was among several sites listed on the National Register as part of a 1998 study.
