= Bon Jellico, Kentucky =

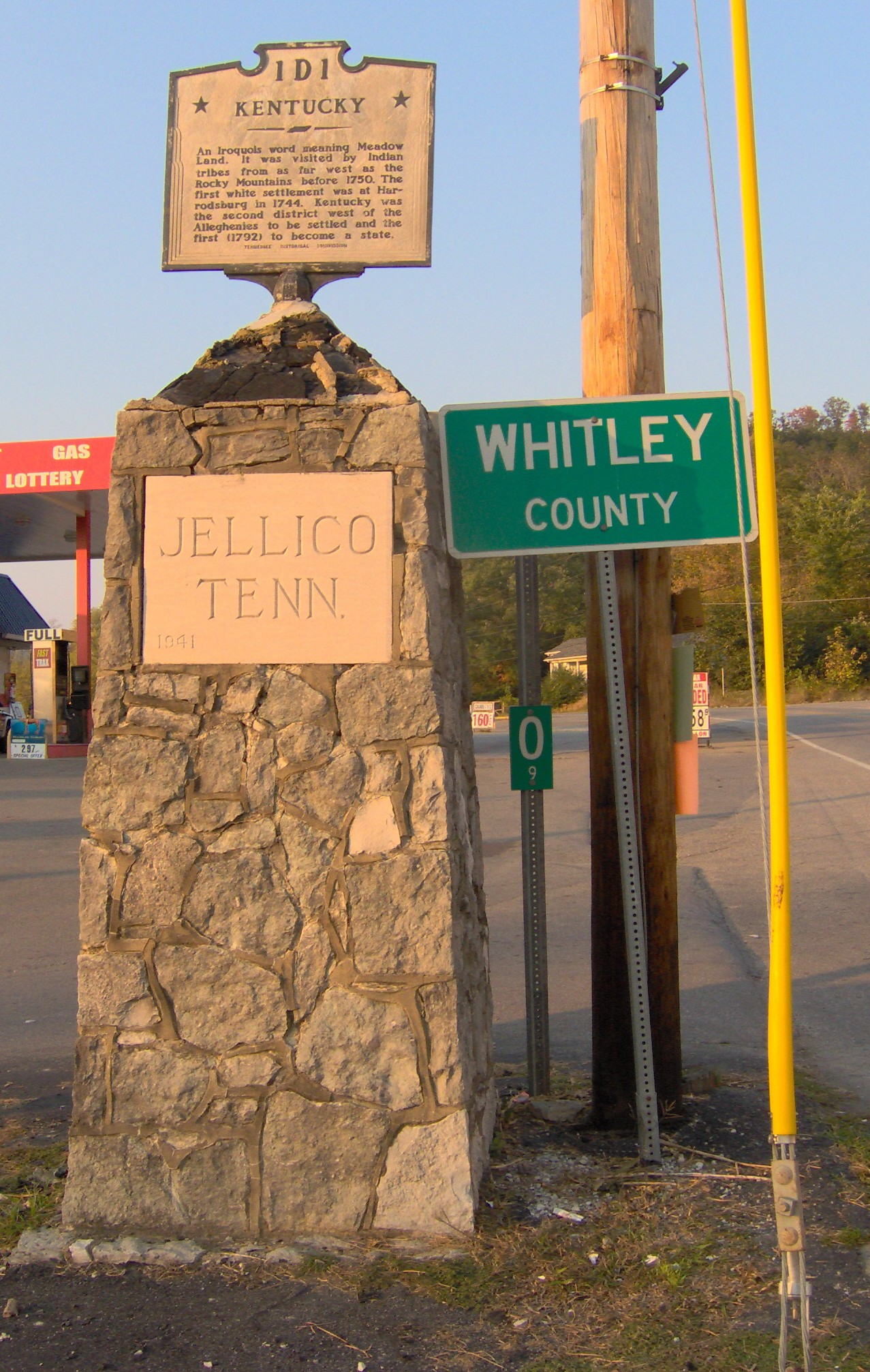
Jellico historical marker at the Kentucky-Tennessee state line

Bon Jellico was a coal camp community established in 1912 near Williamsburg in Whitley County, Kentucky, in the southeastern United States. It was developed by the Bon Jellico Coal Company, which operated until 1937.

== History ==
Bon Jellico was founded in 1912 by the Bon Jellico Coal Company to support its mining operations. The community and mine were named after a local creek flowing from nearby Jellico, Tennessee. About 500 people lived there during its peak in the 1920s. The town had a company store, school, churches, and housing for workers. Like other coal camps of the time, the company controlled daily life.

The mine closed in 1937, and the town was soon abandoned. A Kentucky historical marker now remembers its place in local history.

== See also ==
- List of ghost towns in Kentucky
- Bells Mines, Kentucky
- Coal mining in Kentucky
