= Marion-Crittenden County Airport =

- IATA: none; ICAO: none; FAA LID: 5M9

Summary
- Airport type: Public
- Owner: Marion-Crittenden County Airport Board
- Serves: Marion, Kentucky
- Elevation AMSL: 650 ft / 198 m
- Coordinates: 37°20′11″N 088°06′35″W

Map
- Location of airport in Kentucky

Runways
Direction	Length		Surface
Direction	ft	m	Surface
7/25	4,400	1,341	Asphalt

Statistics (2012)
- Aircraft operations: 3,000
- Based aircraft: 13
- Source: Federal Aviation Administration

Marion-Crittenden County Airport (FAA LID: 5M9) is a public use airport located one nautical mile (2 km) southwest of the central business district of Marion, a city in Crittenden County, Kentucky, United States. It is owned by the Marion-Crittenden County Airport Board. This airport is included in the National Plan of Integrated Airport Systems for 2011–2015, which categorized it as a general aviation facility.

== Facilities and aircraft ==
Marion-Crittenden County Airport covers an area of 150 acres (61 ha) at an elevation of 650 feet (198 m) above mean sea level. It has one runway designated 7/25 with an asphalt surface measuring 4,400 by 75 feet (1,341 x 23 m).

For the 12-month period ending August 22, 2012, the airport had 3,000 aircraft operations, an average of 250 per month: 66.7% general aviation, 16.7% air taxi, and 16.7% military. At that time there were 13 single-engine aircraft based at this airport.

== See also ==
- List of airports in Kentucky
