= Crayne =

Crayne may refer to:

- Crayne, Kentucky, a community in Crittenden County
- Dick Crayne (1913–1985), an American football fullback
