= Crittenden County Schools =

School district in Crittenden County, Kentucky, U.S.

Crittenden County Public Schools is a school district serving Crittenden County, Kentucky. Communities served by the school district include Marion, Crayne, Dycusburg, Tolu and surrounding areas. The school sports teams are called "Rockets". All Crittenden County Schools are located in Marion.

== Schools ==
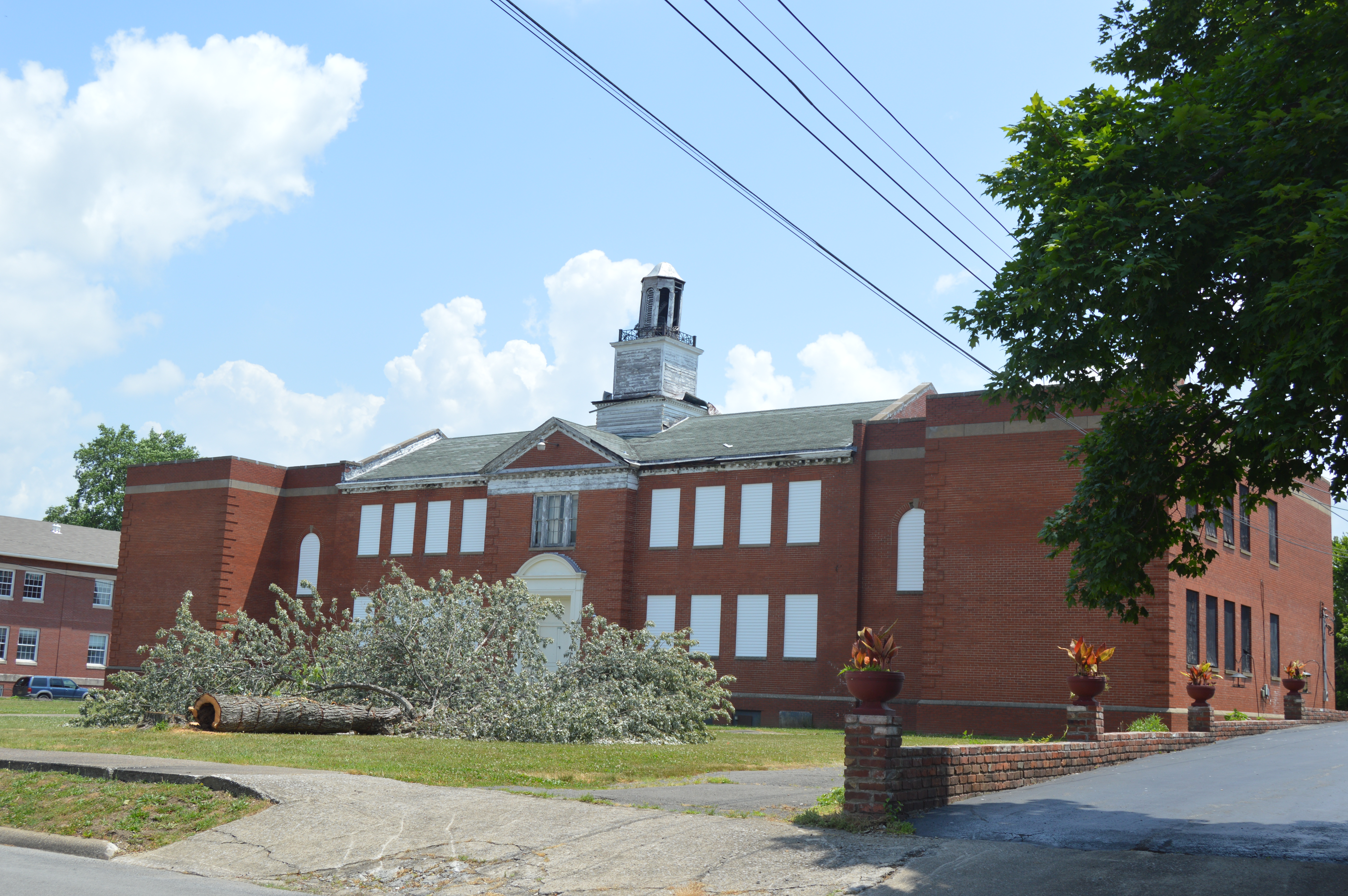
Former high school in Marion

=== Elementary school ===
- Crittenden County Elementary School

=== Middle school ===
- Crittenden County Middle School

=== High school ===
- Crittenden County High School
