= Mexico, Kentucky =

Unincorporated community in Kentucky, United States

Coordinates: 37°13′30″N 88°05′48″W

Mexico is an unincorporated community, in Crittenden County, Kentucky. It lies at an elevation of 495 feet (151 m).
