= Forrest Pogue =

American military historian

Forrest C. Pogue
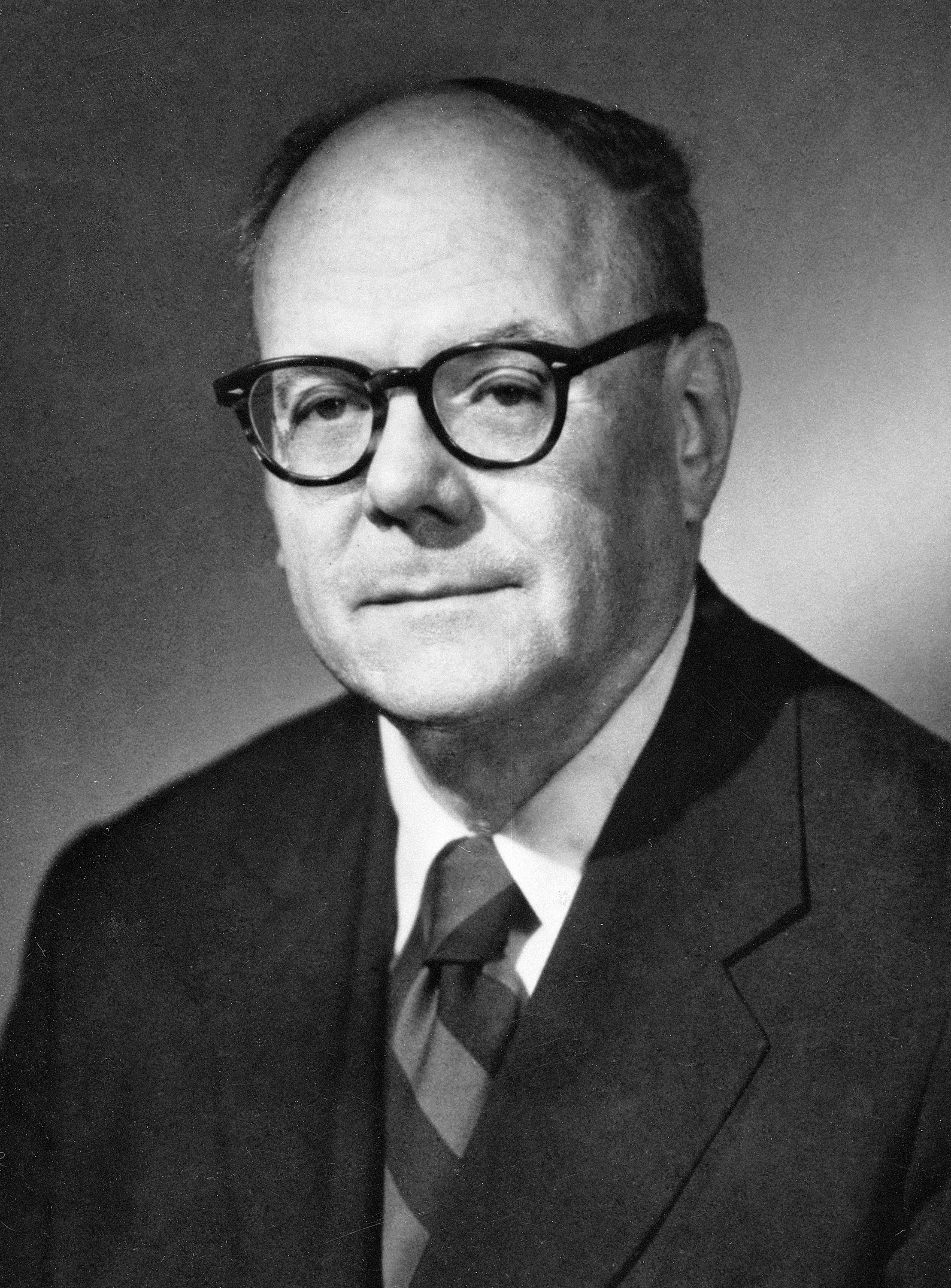
- Pogue in 1960
- Born: Forrest Carlisle Pogue Jr. September 17, 1912; Eddyville, Kentucky
- Died: October 6, 1996 (aged 84); Murray, Kentucky
- Occupation: Military historian
- Years active: 1933–86
- Spouse: Christine Brown Pogue
- Military career
- Allegiance: United States of America
- Branch: United States Army
- Service years: 1942–45
- Rank: Master Sergeant
- Conflicts: World War II: Invasion of Normandy; Liberation of Paris; Battle of the Bulge; Operation Lumberjack; Elbe Day
- Awards: Bronze Star; Croix de Guerre

Forrest Carlisle Pogue Jr. (September 17, 1912 – October 6, 1996) was an official United States Army historian during World War II. He was a proponent of oral history techniques, and collected many oral histories from the war under the direction of chief Army historian S. L. A. Marshall. Forrest Pogue was for many years the executive director of the George C. Marshall Foundation as well as Director of the Marshall Library located on the campus of Virginia Military Institute in Lexington, Virginia.

== Early and personal life ==
Pogue was born in Eddyville, Kentucky. His grandparents, Marion Forrest Pogue and Betty Matthews Pogue, were farmers, and the young Pogue spent much of his early life in Frances, Kentucky, where the Pogue family owned a tract of land. He attended Murray State College, and received his master's degree from the University of Kentucky, as well as a doctorate from Clark University in 1939. Pogue spent a year at the University of Paris, and was fluent in French. Pogue married Christine Brown Pogue.

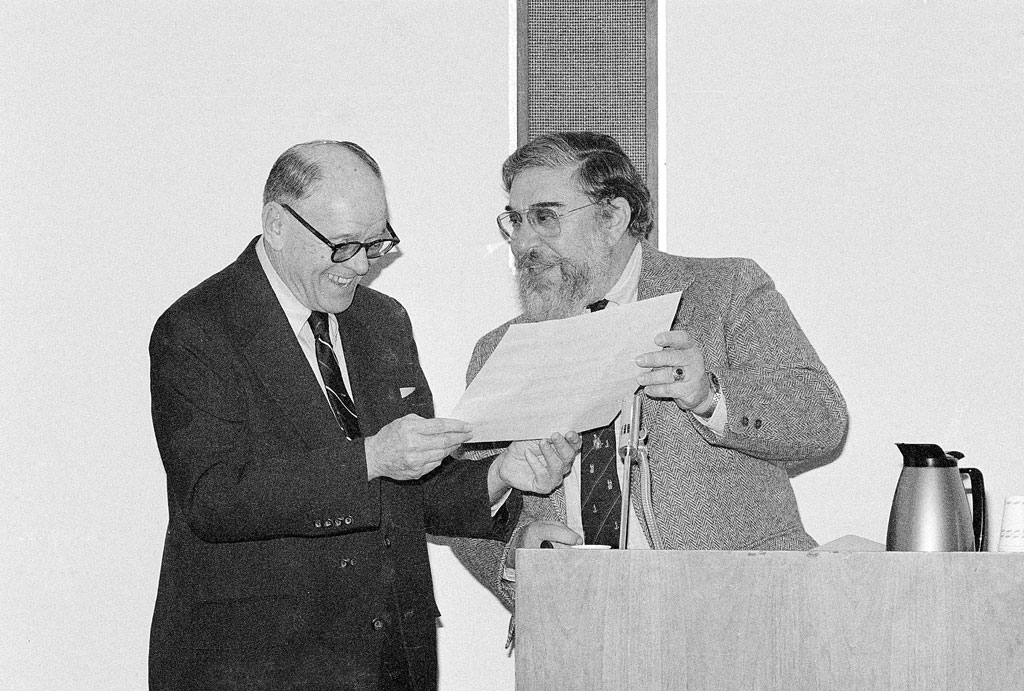
Forrest C. Pogue (left) receiving oral history award from Benis M. Frank

== Career ==
Pogue worked at Murray State, teaching history from June 1933 to May 1942. He was a widely sought speaker, averaging around sixty speeches a year, until he was drafted into the Army in 1942 and promoted to sergeant. He was sent to Fort McClellan and received basic training until being reassigned to a historical unit and made responsible for writing a history of the Second United States Army, and in 1944 was sent to England. He was sent to Normandy to interview wounded soldiers. He worked on the project for eleven months, and was present at the Battle of the Bulge. For his work, he was awarded the Bronze Star Medal and Croix de Guerre. He was discharged in October 1945, and hired as a civilian, with the pay of a colonel.

Pogue was first assigned to write a history of the Supreme Headquarters Allied Expeditionary Force from 1945 to 1946. In July he was assigned by Dwight D. Eisenhower to write an official history of the Supreme Command in Europe. For the book, he interviewed Dwight D. Eisenhower, Omar Bradley, Charles de Gaulle, Alan Brooke and others. Pogue then spent seven years as a military historian, and two conducting operations research at United States Army Garrison Heidelberg with the Operations Research Office at Johns Hopkins University. He contributed to ''The Meaning of Yalta'' among several other books, returning to Murray State in 1954.

In 1956, Pogue was hired by the George C. Marshall Foundation to write the official biography of George Marshall. From 1963 to 1987, he worked on the four volume biography, and read over 3.5 million pages of research material while completing his work on Marshall. He became director of the Marshall Foundation in 1956, leaving in 1974 to become director of the Eisenhower Institute for Historical Research. Pogue retired in 1984. He served as a guest lecturer at George Washington University and the United States Army War College, held the Mary Moody Northen chair in Arts and Sciences at Virginia Military Institute in 1972. Pogue was on the Advisory boards for the Office of Naval History, the Naval Historical Office, the United States Army Center of Military History, the Air Force Historical Research Agency, president of the Oral History Association and the American Military Institute and other organizations. The Pogue Library at Murray State is named after Forrest C. Pogue.

He died at the age of 84 on October 6, 1996, in Murray, Kentucky.

== Bibliography ==
- United States Army in World War II: European Theater of Operations: The Supreme Command. Office of the Chief of Military History, Department of the Army, 1954.
- The Meaning of Yalta: Big Three Diplomacy and the New Balance of Power. Louisiana State University Press, 1956.
- Pogue's War: Diaries of a WWII Combat Historian. University Press of Kentucky, 2001. ISBN 0-8131-2216-3
- "The Genesis of The Supreme Command: Personal Impressions of Eisenhower the General" in Eisenhower: A Centenary Assessment. Günter Bischof and Stephen E. Ambrose, eds. Louisiana State University Press, 1995. ISBN 0807119423
- Command Decisions. Kent Roberts Greenfield, ed. Center of Military History, Department of the Army, 1960.
- Total War and Cold War. Proceedings of the Conference on Civil-Military Relations (1959, Ohio State University, Columbus). Harry Lewis Coles, ed. Ohio State University Press, 1962.
- D-Day: The Normandy Invasion in Retrospect. Milton S. Eisenhower Foundation, University Press of Kansas, 1971.
- Four-volume authorized biography of General George Marshall, Viking, 1963–87:
  - George C. Marshall: Education of a General, 1880–1939
  - George C. Marshall: Ordeal and Hope, 1939–1943
  - George C. Marshall: Organizer of Victory, 1943–1945
  - George C. Marshall: Statesman, 1945–1959
