= National Register of Historic Places listings in Kentucky =

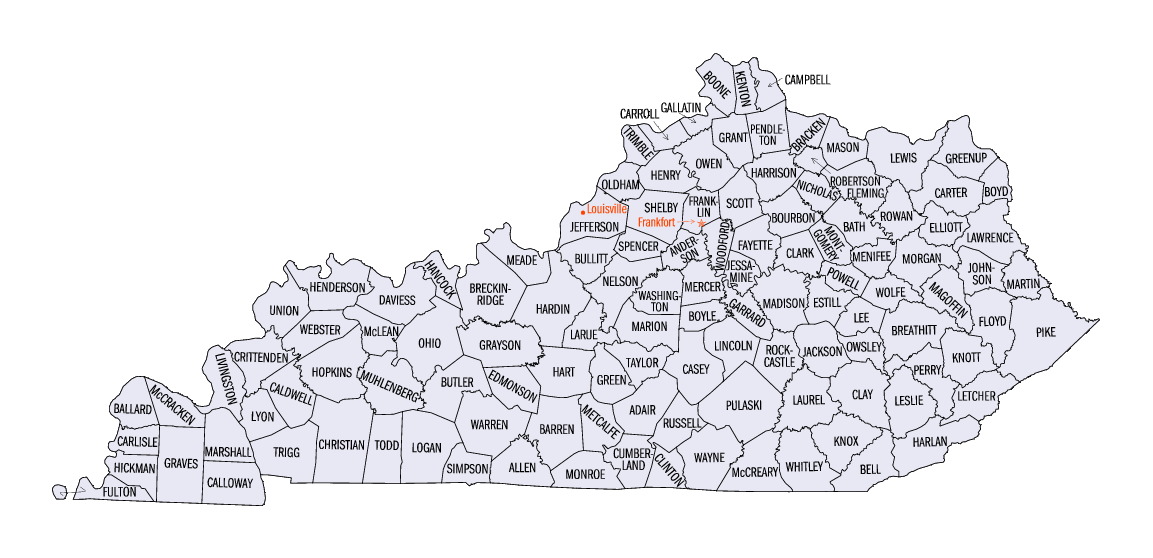
Kentucky counties

Kentucky counties

This is a list of properties and historic districts in Kentucky that are listed on the National Register of Historic Places. There are listings in all of Kentucky's 120 counties.

The locations of National Register properties and districts (at least for all showing latitude and longitude coordinates below), may be seen in an online map by clicking on "Map of all coordinates".

This National Park Service list is complete through NPS recent listings posted October 23, 2026.

== Current listings by county ==
The following are approximate tallies of current listings by county. These counts are based on entries in the National Register Information Database as of April 24, 2008 and new weekly listings posted since then on the National Register of Historic Places web site. There are frequent additions to the listings and occasional delistings and the counts here are approximate and not official. New entries are added to the official Register on a weekly basis. Also, the counts in this table exclude boundary increase and decrease listings which only modify the area covered by an existing property or district, although carrying a separate National Register reference number.

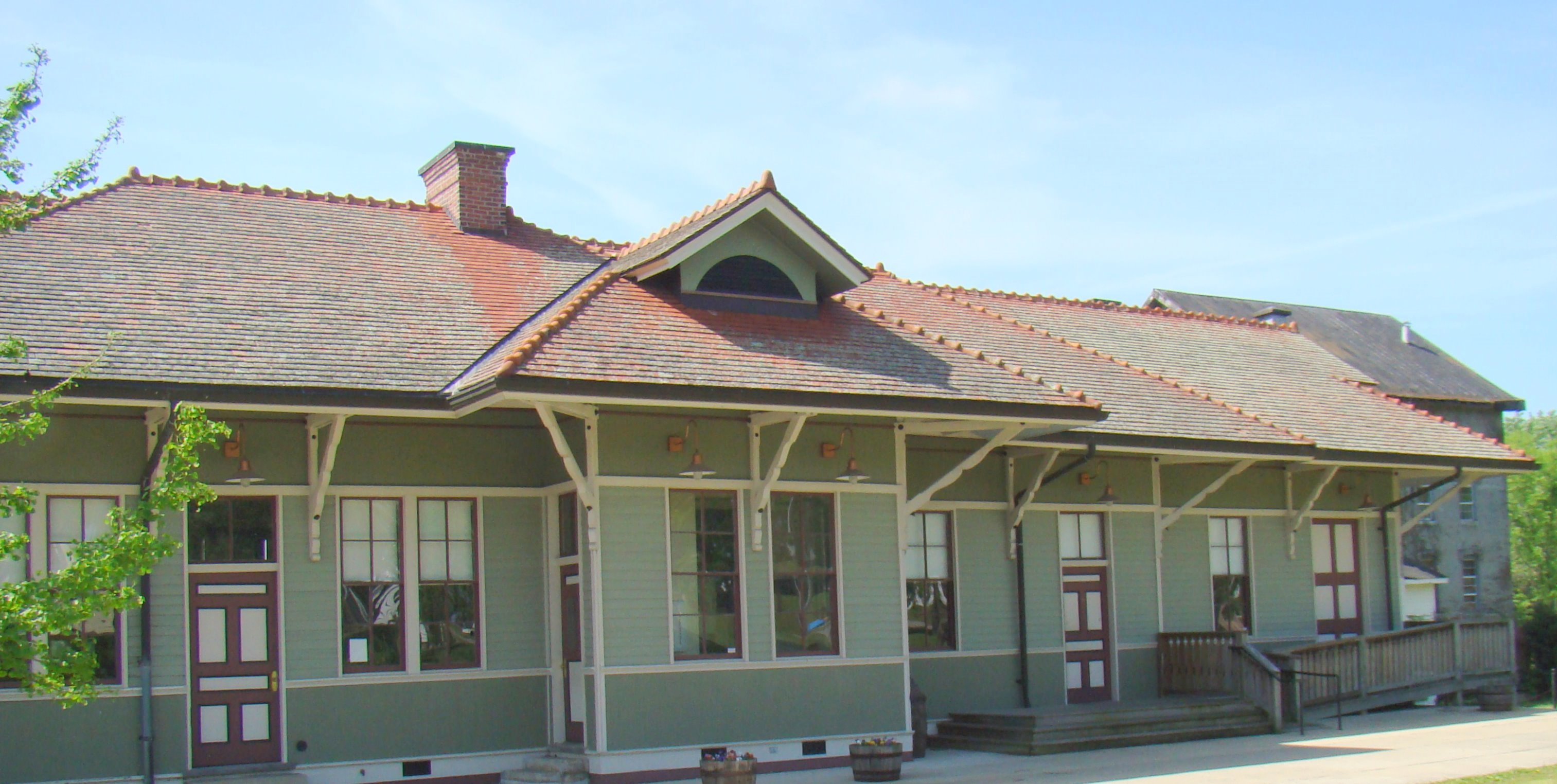
Baughman's Mill and Stanford Railroad Depot, in Lincoln County

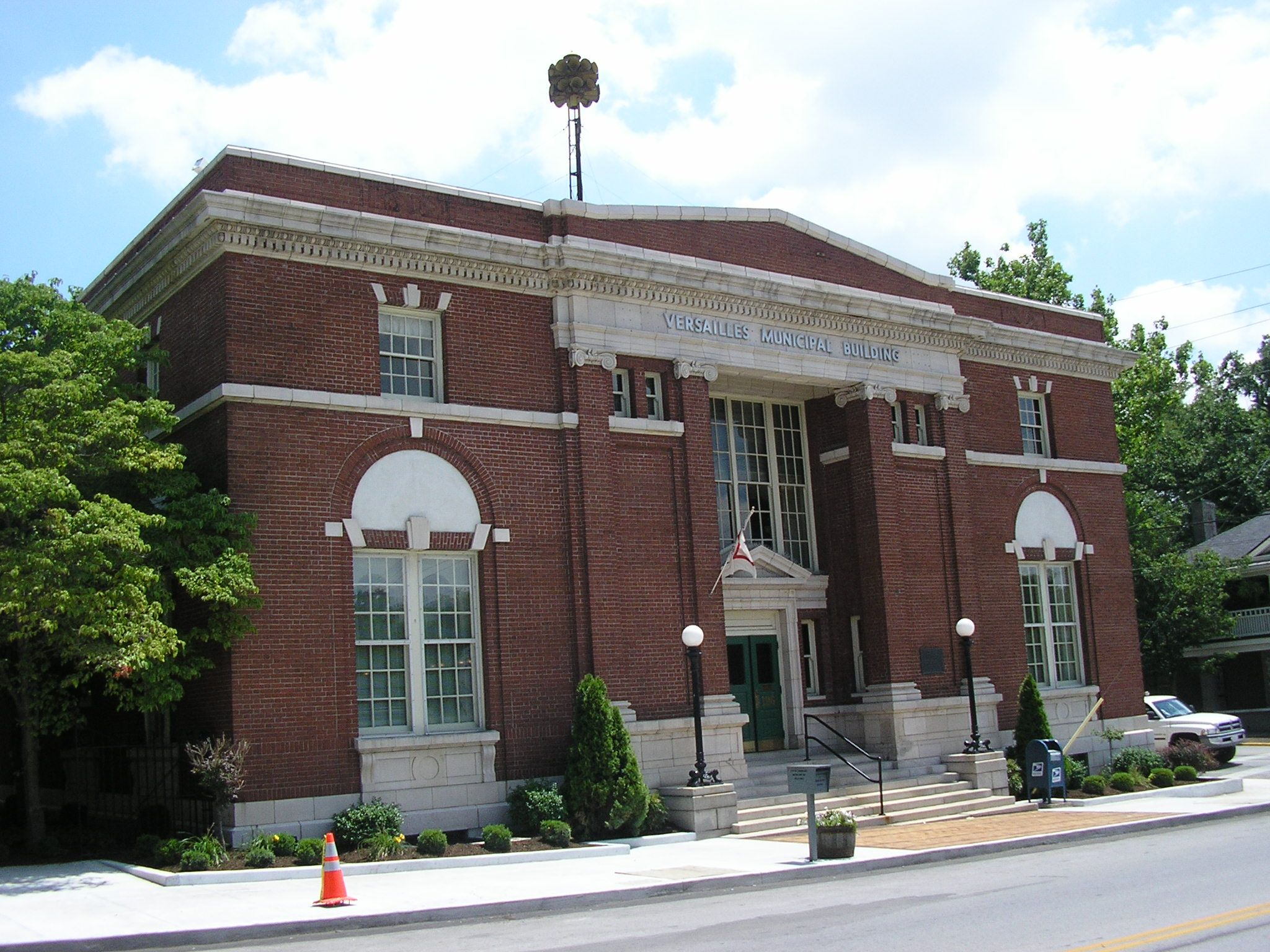
Downtown Versailles Historic District in Woodford County

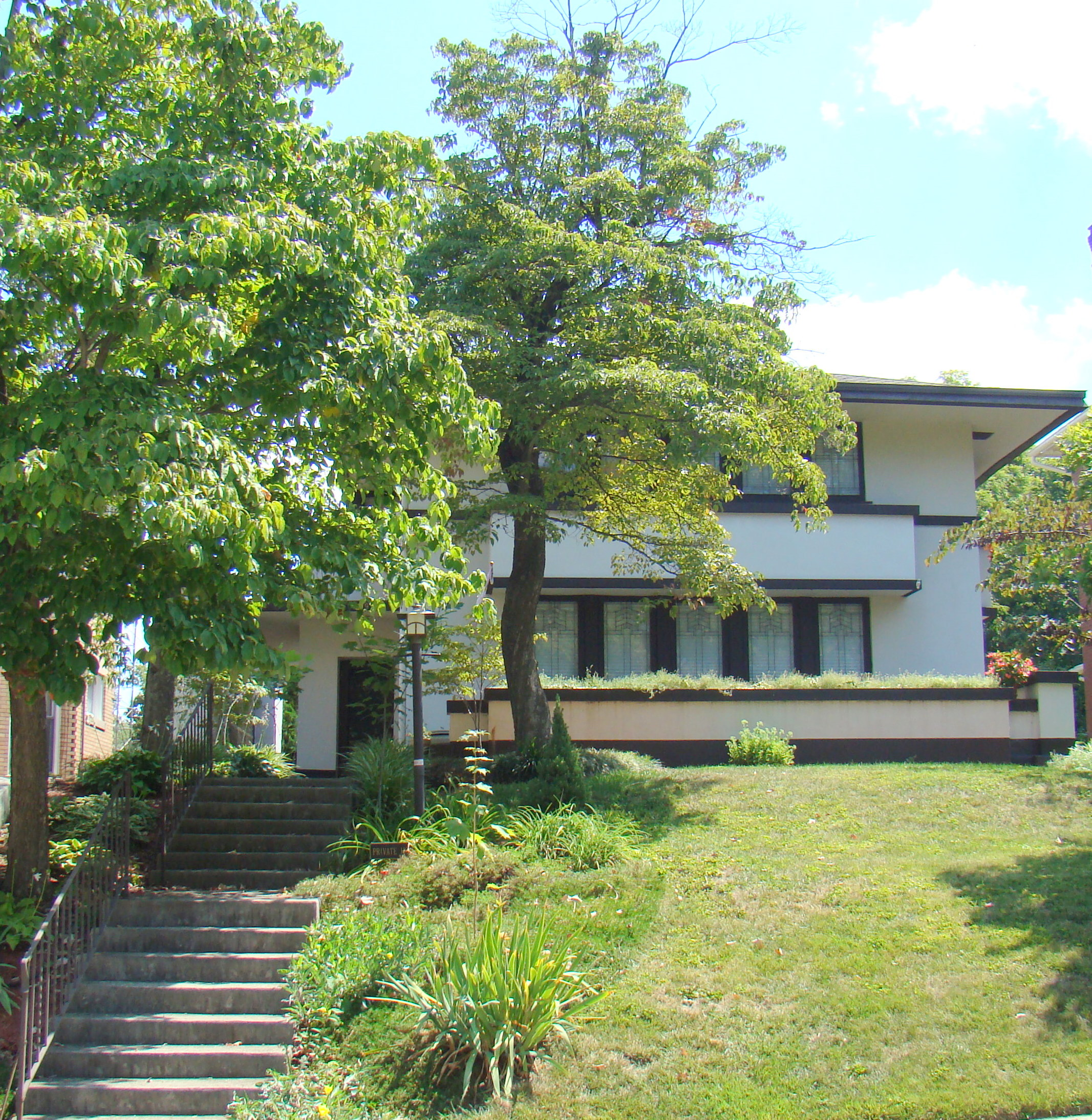
Rev. Jesse R. Zeigler House in Franklin County

| | County | # of Sites |
|---|---|---|
| 1 | Adair | 10 |
| 2 | Allen | 13 |
| 3 | Anderson | 12 |
| 4 | Ballard | 6 |
| 5 | Barren | 35 |
| 6 | Bath | 10 |
| 7 | Bell | 11 |
| 8 | Boone | 107 |
| 9 | Bourbon | 61 |
| 10 | Boyd | 27 |
| 11 | Boyle | 100 |
| 12 | Bracken | 25 |
| 13 | Breathitt | 7 |
| 14 | Breckinridge | 11 |
| 15 | Bullitt | 11 |
| 16 | Butler | 16 |
| 17 | Caldwell | 10 |
| 18 | Calloway | 18 |
| 19 | Campbell | 71 |
| 20 | Carlisle | 5 |
| 21 | Carroll | 11 |
| 22 | Carter | 4 |
| 23 | Casey | 2 |
| 24 | Christian | 51 |
| 25 | Clark | 68 |
| 26 | Clay | 5 |
| 27 | Clinton | 2 |
| 28 | Crittenden | 3 |
| 29 | Cumberland | 3 |
| 30 | Daviess | 40 |
| 31 | Edmonson | 24 |
| 32 | Elliott | 1 |
| 33 | Estill | 8 |
| 34 | Fayette | 182 |
| 35 | Fleming | 11 |
| 36 | Floyd | 16 |
| 37 | Franklin | 59 |
| 38 | Fulton | 16 |
| 39 | Gallatin | 4 |
| 40 | Garrard | 67 |
| 41 | Grant | 3 |
| 42 | Graves | 11 |
| 43 | Grayson | 11 |
| 44 | Green | 47 |
| 45 | Greenup | 20 |
| 46 | Hancock | 12 |
| 47 | Hardin | 90 |
| 48 | Harlan | 6 |
| 49 | Harrison | 25 |
| 50 | Hart | 22 |
| 51 | Henderson | 27 |
| 52 | Henry | 12 |
| 53 | Hickman | 5 |
| 54 | Hopkins | 32 |
| 55 | Jackson | 5 |
| 56.1 | Jefferson: Anchorage | 35 |
| 56.2 | Jefferson: Downtown Louisville | 93 |
| 56.3 | Jefferson: The Highlands, Louisville | 32 |
| 56.4 | Jefferson: Old Louisville | 35 |
| 56.5 | Jefferson: Portland | 36 |
| 56.6 | Jefferson: West End Louisville | 53 |
| 56.7 | Jefferson: Other | 232 |
| 56.8 | Jefferson: Total | 516 |
| 57 | Jessamine | 76 |
| 58 | Johnson | 39 |
| 59 | Kenton | 71 |
| 60 | Knott | 5 |
| 61 | Knox | 8 |
| 62 | LaRue | 31 |
| 63 | Laurel | 9 |
| 64 | Lawrence | 10 |
| 65 | Lee | 10 |
| 66 | Leslie | 5 |
| 67 | Letcher | 5 |
| 68 | Lewis | 6 |
| 69 | Lincoln | 22 |
| 70 | Livingston | 8 |
| 71 | Logan | 22 |
| 72 | Lyon | 3 |
| 73 | Madison | 82 |
| 74 | Magoffin | 3 |
| 75 | Marion | 12 |
| 76 | Marshall | 6 |
| 77 | Martin | 3 |
| 78 | Mason | 41 |
| 79 | McCracken | 34 |
| 80 | McCreary | 3 |
| 81 | McLean | 10 |
| 82 | Meade | 13 |
| 83 | Menifee | 6 |
| 84 | Mercer | 71 |
| 85 | Metcalfe | 5 |
| 86 | Monroe | 6 |
| 87 | Montgomery | 18 |
| 88 | Morgan | 9 |
| 89 | Muhlenberg | 13 |
| 90 | Nelson | 43 |
| 91 | Nicholas | 12 |
| 92 | Ohio | 19 |
| 93 | Oldham | 48 |
| 94 | Owen | 17 |
| 95 | Owsley | 1 |
| 96 | Pendleton | 20 |
| 97 | Perry | 3 |
| 98 | Pike | 16 |
| 99 | Powell | 17 |
| 100 | Pulaski | 43 |
| 101 | Robertson | 3 |
| 102 | Rockcastle | 4 |
| 103 | Rowan | 14 |
| 104 | Russell | 2 |
| 105 | Scott | 83 |
| 106 | Shelby | 140 |
| 107 | Simpson | 14 |
| 108 | Spencer | 14 |
| 109 | Taylor | 14 |
| 110 | Todd | 15 |
| 111 | Trigg | 10 |
| 112 | Trimble | 29 |
| 113 | Union | 7 |
| 114 | Warren | 102 |
| 115 | Washington | 68 |
| 116 | Wayne | 9 |
| 117 | Webster | 3 |
| 118 | Whitley | 13 |
| 119 | Wolfe | 5 |
| 120 | Woodford | 86 |
| (duplicates) | | (19) |
| Total: | | 3,508 |

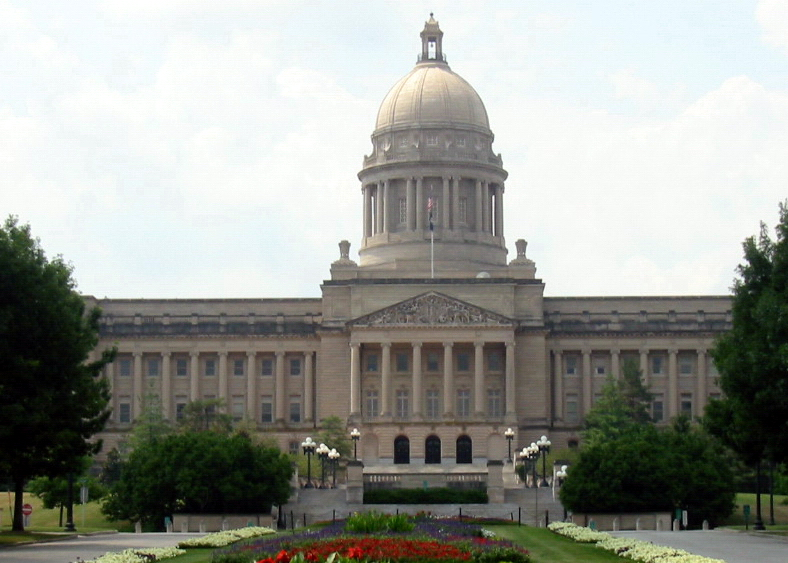
Kentucky State Capitol in Franklin County

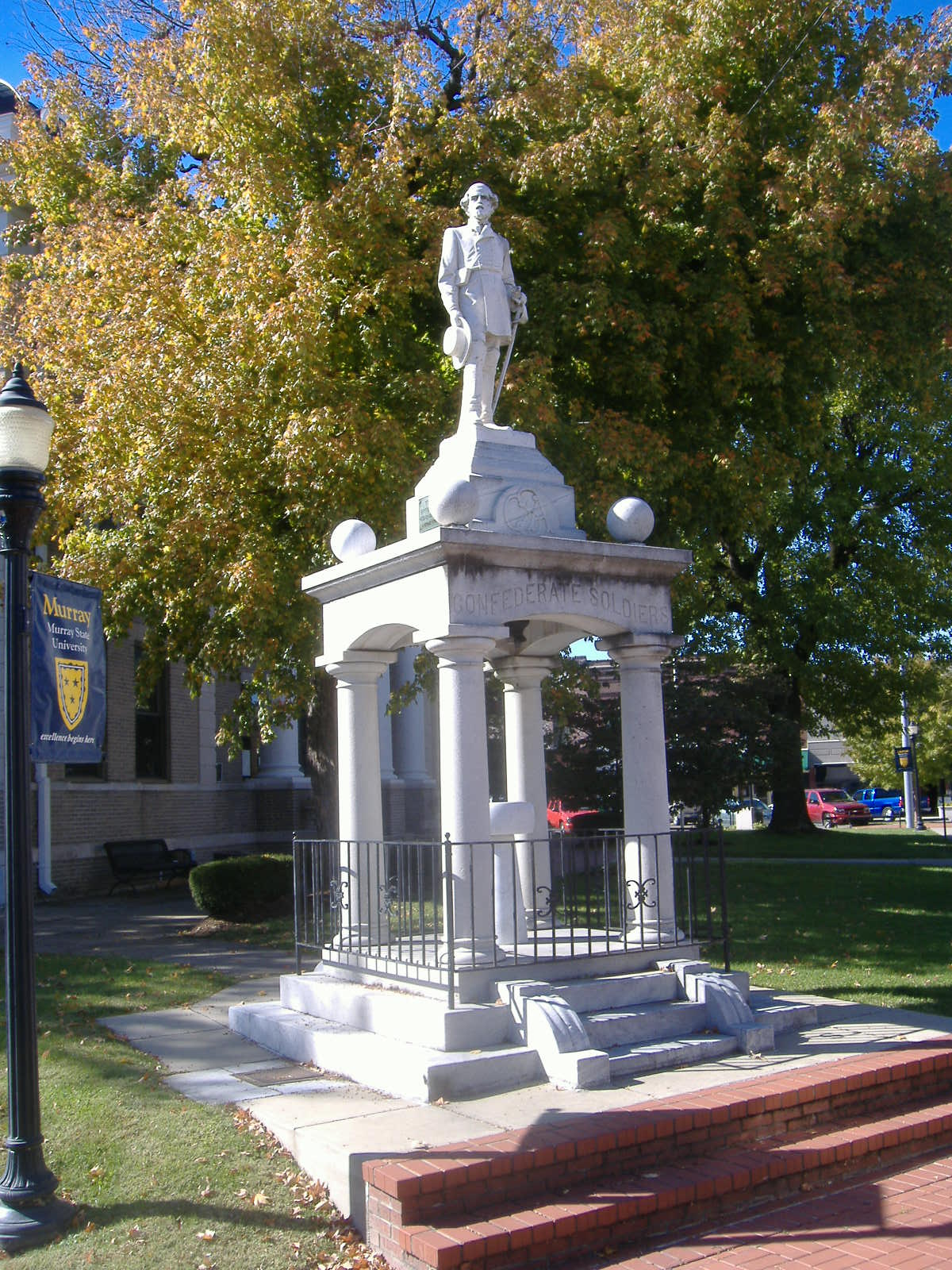
Confederate Monument in Murray in Calloway County

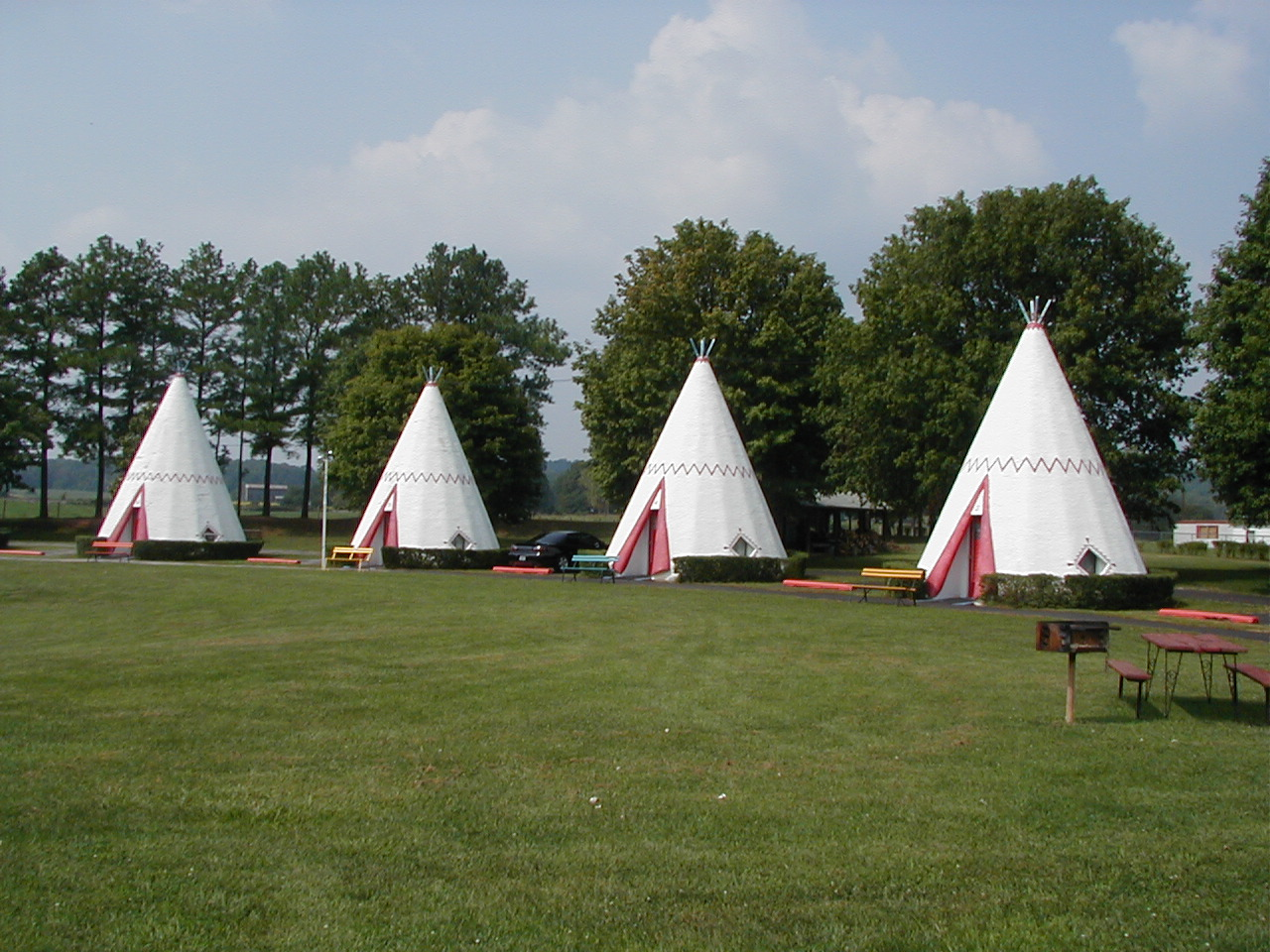
Wigwam Village No. 2 in Barren County

== See also ==
- List of National Historic Landmarks in Kentucky
- List of historical societies in Kentucky
- List of bridges on the National Register of Historic Places in Kentucky
