= Hilltop, Kentucky =

- Ghost town
- Location within Kentucky
- Coordinates: 37°44′24″N 85°00′21″W
- Country: United States
- State: Kentucky
- County: Mercer
- Elevation: 902 ft (275 m)
- GNIS feature ID: 2566098

Hilltop is a ghost town in Mercer County, Kentucky, United States. Hilltop was located along what is now Kentucky Route 152 3.4 miles (5.5 km) east of Mackville.
