= View, Kentucky =

Unincorporated community in Kentucky, United States

View
- Unincorporated community
- Location within the state of Kentucky View (the United States)
- Coordinates: 37°15′48″N 88°8′19″W
- Country: United States
- State: Kentucky
- County: Crittenden
- Elevation: 440 ft (130 m)
- Time zone: UTC-5 (Eastern (EST))
  - Summer (DST): UTC-4 (EDT)
- GNIS feature ID: 509289

View is an unincorporated community within Crittenden County, Kentucky, United States.
