= List of ghost towns in Kentucky =

This is an incomplete list of ghost towns in Kentucky.

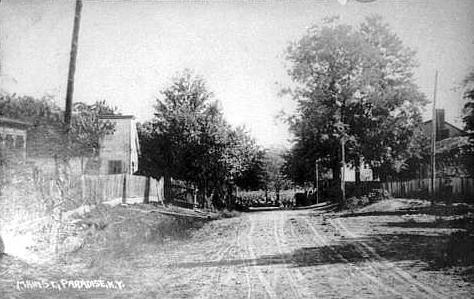
Main Street, Paradise, Kentucky in 1898

- Airdrie
- Barthell
- Bells Mines
- Blue Heron
- Bon Jellico
- Burgess Railroad Station
- Chaumont
- Creelsboro
- Fords Ferry
- Elko
- Fudge
- Golden Pond
- Hilltop
- Jonkan
- Kyrock
- Neal
- Notch Lick
- Packard
- Paradise
- Scuffletown
- Sugartit
