= National Register of Historic Places listings in Marshall County, Kentucky =

Location of Marshall County in Kentucky

This is a list of the National Register of Historic Places listings in Marshall County, Kentucky.

This is intended to be a complete list of the properties on the National Register of Historic Places in Marshall County, Kentucky, United States. The locations of National Register properties for which the latitude and longitude coordinates are included below, may be seen in a map.

There are 6 properties listed on the National Register in the county.

This National Park Service list is complete through NPS recent listings posted December 12, 2025.

== Current listings ==
	Name on the Register	Image	Date listed	Location	City or town	Description
1	Archeological Site No. 15 Ml 109	Archeological Site No. 15 Ml 109	January 27, 1983 (#83002813)	Ridgetop above the Middle Fork of Clarks River; 36°52′50″N 88°25′10″W	Benton	Also known as the "Chambers Site"
2	Cherokee State Park	Cherokee State Park	January 9, 2009 (#08001120)	542 Kenlake Rd. 36°45′40″N 88°08′33″W	Hardin	
3	Kentucky Hydroelectric Project	Kentucky Hydroelectric Project	August 11, 2017 (#100001456)	640 Kentucky Dam Rd. 37°00′40″N 88°16′19″W	Grand Rivers	Extends into Livingston County
4	James R. Lemon House	James R. Lemon House	August 28, 1975 (#75000802)	1309 Main St. 36°51′19″N 88°21′02″W	Benton	
5	Oak Hill	Oak Hill	December 31, 1974 (#74000894)	26 Aspen St. 37°01′50″N 88°20′52″W	Calvert City	
6	Stilley House	Stilley House	September 4, 1986 (#86002195)	925 Birch St. 36°51′33″N 88°20′49″W	Benton	No longer extant.

== See also ==
- List of National Historic Landmarks in Kentucky
- National Register of Historic Places listings in Kentucky
