= Livingston Central High School =

Location
- 750 U.S. 60 West; Smithland, KY 42081; 37.13185°N 88.40378°W

Information
- Type: Public
- School district: Livingston County Schools
- Principal: Stephanie Wood
- Grades: 9-12
- Enrollment: 326 (2023-2024)
- Campus: Rural
- Colors: Red and white
- Nickname: Cardinals
- Website: Livingston Central High School Website

Livingston Central High School is a public high school located in Smithland, Kentucky. Its mascot is the cardinal.

LCHS offers many varsity sports, including golf, girls volleyball, boys and girls basketball, baseball, and softball, track and field team and a cross country team.

LCHS offers classes in all core subjects as mandated by the state. It also offers agriculture, shop, business, P.E., art, music, band, and choir classes. It also offers AP courses and dual credit.

The school is a predominantly White American, with a small percentage of African American and Asian students.
