= Midway, Crittenden County, Kentucky =

Unincorporated community in Kentucky, United States

Midway, Kentucky
- Unincorporated community
- Location within the state of Kentucky Midway (the United States)
- Coordinates: 37°18′20″N 88°10′33″W
- Country: United States
- State: Kentucky
- County: Crittenden
- Elevation: 522 ft (159 m)
- Time zone: UTC-6 (Central (CST))
  - Summer (DST): UTC-5 (CST)
- GNIS feature ID: 508602

Midway is an unincorporated community in Crittenden County, Kentucky, United States.
