= Bells Mines, Kentucky =

Coordinates: 37.5097°N 88.0222°W

Bells Mines is a ghost town which was located between Sturgis and Marion, Kentucky, near the Ohio River, in Crittenden County, Kentucky, United States. Bells Mines is an unincorporated area of Crittenden County.

== History ==
Bells Mines was first settled in the early 1800s by farmers and settlers from Virginia, North Carolina and South Carolina, eastern parts of Kentucky, and miners from England and Germany. Its name is derived from the vicinity in which a number of coal mines were operated by the Bells Mine(s) Coal Company owned by John Bell (1796–1869), a prominent and affluent antebellum politician and businessman who was once Speaker of the United States House of Representatives and an 1860 Candidate for President of the United States.

Around 1850 the mine was managed by Bell's son, John Bell Jr.

During the American Civil War, on July 13, 1864, Bells Mines was the site of a skirmish between 46 men of Company C of the 52nd Regiment Kentucky Volunteer Mounted Infantry and a band of 300 guerrillas sympathetic to the Confederate States of America. According to the company's reports, one soldier was killed, 11 men were captured (6 of which subsequently escaped according to the Evansville Daily Journal) and 22 horses were killed.

A critical part of life in Bells Mines were its churches. The Cumberland Presbyterian Church, founded in 1830s, served the community and its descendants for over 150 years. After the town was abandoned, and with diminishing membership, services ceased in June 1998. Due to vandalism, theft and lack of use, its last members chose to raze the 111-year-old church in December 2002.

In the 1950s Alcoa purchased nearly 12,000 acres (4,900 ha) of land, one of the largest privately owned parcels in Kentucky, in Crittenden County, Kentucky and Union County, Kentucky, including much of the Bells Mines community, presumably to acquire a coal reserve and build a smelter in the area. This action served as the final catalyst for the dissolution of the community. Many families sold their homes at deep discounts with the prospects of the new smelting operation. Alcoa subsequently decided to place the smelting complex on the other side of the Ohio River in Newburgh, Indiana, and it was reported that Alcoa senior executives used the land in and around the former Bells Mines community for hunting retreats.

== Recent developments ==
The land surrounding and encompassing Bells Mines is now so rich with wildlife, from having been largely unoccupied by people for decades, that it was acquired by the United States Forest Service and the Kentucky Department of Fish and Wildlife Resources (KDFWR) for the purpose of creating a Wildlife management area from Caseyville in Union County, Kentucky to the former Bells Mines area. This represented the largest land acquisition by the state of Kentucky in over two decades.

The Big Rivers Wildlife Management Area (WMA) and State Forest in Crittenden County was declared formally opened to the public on November 1, 2013.

== See also ==
- List of ghost towns in Kentucky
