= Crittenden County, Kentucky =

County in Kentucky, United States

- County
- Location within the U.S. state of Kentucky
- Coordinates: 37.36°N 88.09°W
- Country: United States
- State: Kentucky
- Founded: 1842
- Named for: John J. Crittenden
- Seat: Marion
- Largest city: Marion

Government
  - Judge/Executive: Perry Newcom (R)

Area
  - Total: 371 sq mi (960 km^{2})
  - Land: 360 sq mi (930 km^{2})
  - Water: 11 sq mi (28 km^{2}) 3.0%

Population (2020)
  - Total: 8,990
  - Estimate (2025): 8,807 ▼
  - Density: 24.5/sq mi (9.5/km^{2})
- Time zone: UTC−6 (Central)
  - Summer (DST): UTC−5 (CDT)
- Congressional district: 1st
- Website: www.crittendencountyky.org

Crittenden County is a county in the U.S. state of Kentucky. At the 2020 census, the population was 8,990. Its county seat and only municipality is Marion. The county was formed in 1842 and named for John J. Crittenden, senator and future Governor of Kentucky.

== History ==
Crittenden County, located on the Ohio and Tradewater Rivers in the Pennyroyal region of Kentucky, was created by the state legislature on April 1, 1842, from a portion of Livingston County. It became the state's 91st county, and was named for John J. Crittenden, a U.S. senator, attorney general, and governor of Kentucky. The first county seat was in Crooked Creek, but it was moved to Marion just two years later.

Crittenden County was once crossed by the Chickasaw Road, which was a part of the Old Saline Trace. This footpath was used by Native Americans when hunting game that crossed the Ohio River to the salt licks in Illinois. The first settler in the area was James Armstrong, who arrived from South Carolina in 1786 and built a log cabin. His family joined him five years later, along with other families who came to settle there. Early in the 19th century, Flynn's Ferry was established where the trail crossed the river.

Generally pro-Confederate during the American Civil War, the county saw little fighting, although both armies passed through it repeatedly. However, several skirmishes did place there, and the county courthouse was burned by Confederate Brigadier General Hylan B. Lyon during his raid across western Kentucky in December 1864. Lyon's men, all Kentuckians, burned a total of seven courthouses, since the Union Army was using them for barracks. The Confederates allowed the locals to remove the records before setting fire to the courthouses.

Crittenden County has valuable deposits of fluorspar, zinc, porcelain, coal, limestone, and sand for making glass. Marion was primarily an industrial town in the 1840s associated with the large fluorspar mining industry. This industry peaked in 1947 and has been in slow decline since. Iron production was also a prominent industry in the mid-19th century, with several furnaces being built in the county, one owned by Andrew Jackson. Other products produced in the county include lumber, glass, modular homes, and blue crystal that was made famous by Ball canning jars. Today the county has a strong agricultural economy. In 1992, 66 percent of the population lived on farms, with 45 percent of the population reporting farming as their primary occupation.

== Geography ==
According to the U.S. Census Bureau, the county has a total area of 371 square miles (960 km^{2}), of which 360 square miles (930 km^{2}) is land and 11 square miles (28 km^{2}) (3.0%) is water. Its northwestern border with Illinois is formed by the Ohio River.

=== Major highways ===
- U.S. Route 60
- U.S. Route 641
- Kentucky Route 70
- Kentucky Route 91
- Kentucky Route 120
- Kentucky Route 295

=== Adjacent counties ===
- Hardin County, Illinois (northwest)
- Union County (north)
- Webster County (northeast)
- Caldwell County (southeast)
- Lyon County (south)
- Livingston County (west)

== Demographics ==
Historical population
Census	Pop.	Note	%±
1850	6,351		—
1860	8,796		38.5%
1870	9,381		6.7%
1880	11,688		24.6%
1890	13,119		12.2%
1900	15,191		15.8%
1910	13,296		−12.5%
1920	13,125		−1.3%
1930	11,931		−9.1%
1940	12,115		1.5%
1950	10,818		−10.7%
1960	8,648		−20.1%
1970	8,493		−1.8%
1980	9,207		8.4%
1990	9,196		−0.1%
2000	9,384		2.0%
2010	9,315		−0.7%
2020	8,990		−3.5%
2025 (est.)	8,807	▼	−2.0%
U.S. Decennial Census; 1790-1960 1900-90; 1990-2000 2010-20 2025

=== 2020 census ===
As of the 2020 census, the county had a population of 8,990. The median age was 43.8 years. 22.6% of residents were under the age of 18 and 20.9% of residents were 65 years of age or older. For every 100 females there were 100.2 males, and for every 100 females age 18 and over there were 97.4 males age 18 and over.

The racial makeup of the county was 95.2% White, 0.9% Black or African American, 0.2% American Indian and Alaska Native, 0.1% Asian, 0.1% Native Hawaiian and Pacific Islander, 0.4% from some other race, and 3.2% from two or more races. Hispanic or Latino residents of any race comprised 1.3% of the population.

0.0% of residents lived in urban areas, while 100.0% lived in rural areas.

There were 3,604 households in the county, of which 29.4% had children under the age of 18 living with them and 25.2% had a female householder with no spouse or partner present. About 28.9% of all households were made up of individuals and 14.4% had someone living alone who was 65 years of age or older.

There were 4,331 housing units, of which 16.8% were vacant. Among occupied housing units, 74.9% were owner-occupied and 25.1% were renter-occupied. The homeowner vacancy rate was 1.4% and the rental vacancy rate was 8.4%.

=== 2000 census ===
As of the census of 2000, there were 9,384 people, 3,829 households, and 2,707 families residing in the county. The population density was 26 per square mile (10/km^{2}). There were 4,410 housing units at an average density of 12 per square mile (4.6/km^{2}). The racial makeup of the county was 98.24% White, 0.65% Black or African American, 0.15% Native American, 0.09% Asian, 0.14% from other races, and 0.74% from two or more races. 0.51% of the population were Hispanic or Latino of any race.

There were 3,829 households, out of which 29.60% had children under the age of 18 living with them, 58.80% were married couples living together, 8.90% had a female householder with no husband present, and 29.30% were non-families. 27.00% of all households were made up of individuals, and 13.80% had someone living alone who was 65 years of age or older. The average household size was 2.42 and the average family size was 2.93.

In the county, the population was spread out, with 23.20% under the age of 18, 8.00% from 18 to 24, 26.10% from 25 to 44, 26.40% from 45 to 64, and 16.30% who were 65 years of age or older. The median age was 40 years. For every 100 females there were 93.80 males. For every 100 females age 18 and over, there were 92.50 males.

The median income for a household in the county was $29,060, and the median income for a family was $36,462. Males had a median income of $30,509 versus $18,961 for females. The per capita income for the county was $15,262. About 14.70% of families and 19.10% of the population were below the poverty line, including 30.80% of those under age 18 and 15.70% of those age 65 or over.

== Communities ==
=== City ===
- Marion (county seat)

=== Census-designated places ===
- Crayne
- Tolu

=== Other unincorporated communities ===
- Centerville
- Dycusburg
- Frances
- Irma
- Levias
- Mattoon
- Mexico
- Midway
- Nunn
- Piney
- Piney Fork
- Repton
- Shady Grove
- Sheridan
- Tribune
- View
- Weston

=== Ghost towns ===
- Fords Ferry
- Bells Mines

== Politics ==
United States presidential election results for Crittenden County, Kentucky
Year	Republican		Democratic		Third party(ies)	
Year	No.	%	No.	%	No.	%
1912	1,367	45.52%	1,230	40.96%	406	13.52%
1916	1,794	54.50%	1,455	44.20%	43	1.31%
1920	3,149	59.29%	2,138	40.26%	24	0.45%
1924	2,539	56.75%	1,869	41.77%	66	1.48%
1928	3,000	68.46%	1,376	31.40%	6	0.14%
1932	2,185	50.58%	2,119	49.05%	16	0.37%
1936	2,441	55.79%	1,926	44.02%	8	0.18%
1940	2,624	58.68%	1,834	41.01%	14	0.31%
1944	2,690	63.16%	1,544	36.25%	25	0.59%
1948	1,927	55.09%	1,497	42.80%	74	2.12%
1952	2,471	63.13%	1,427	36.46%	16	0.41%
1956	2,548	62.64%	1,494	36.73%	26	0.64%
1960	2,770	67.74%	1,319	32.26%	0	0.00%
1964	1,863	53.27%	1,627	46.53%	7	0.20%
1968	1,942	54.97%	838	23.72%	753	21.31%
1972	2,248	71.52%	859	27.33%	36	1.15%
1976	1,596	47.61%	1,715	51.16%	41	1.22%
1980	2,219	58.84%	1,508	39.99%	44	1.17%
1984	2,167	59.16%	1,483	40.49%	13	0.35%
1988	2,211	60.31%	1,443	39.36%	12	0.33%
1992	1,576	41.26%	1,740	45.55%	504	13.19%
1996	1,509	44.33%	1,480	43.48%	415	12.19%
2000	2,469	59.44%	1,610	38.76%	75	1.81%
2004	2,726	65.06%	1,438	34.32%	26	0.62%
2008	2,604	66.26%	1,254	31.91%	72	1.83%
2012	2,839	73.66%	960	24.91%	55	1.43%
2016	3,290	81.50%	617	15.28%	130	3.22%
2020	3,451	81.35%	731	17.23%	60	1.41%
2024	3,349	83.52%	608	15.16%	53	1.32%

Although Crittenden County was by no means pro-Union during the Civil War – only 4.02 percent of its white male population served in the Union Army vis-à-vis over six percent for Kentucky as a whole – the county became strongly Republican in later years due to its deep ties to Illinois areas which came to support that party as a result of the war. Since 1884, the solitary Democrat to gain a majority in Crittenden County has been Jimmy Carter in 1976, although William Jennings Bryan won by two votes in 1896 and Bill Clinton obtained a plurality of 164 votes in 1992.

In gubernatorial elections, Crittenden was during the twentieth century likewise frequently the only county west of the Western Coalfield to support the Republican candidate – a scenario observed in 1979, and with one exception in 1995.

=== Elected officials ===
Elected officials as of January 3, 2025
U.S. House	James Comer (R)	KY 1
Ky. Senate	Jason Howell (R)	1
Ky. House	Jim Gooch Jr. (R)	12

== Education ==
Students in Crittenden County attend Crittenden County Schools located in Marion.

== Notable people ==
- Lee Cruce, attorney, second Governor of Oklahoma, Crittenden County native, Democratic Party (United States).
- William J. Deboe (June 30, 1849 – June 15, 1927), a Republican, was a U.S. Senator representing Kentucky from 1897 to 1903.
- Ollie M. James (July 27, 1871 – August 28, 1918), a Democrat, represented Kentucky in the United States House of Representatives from 1903 to 1913 and the United States Senate from 1913 to 1918.
- Walter Walker (1883–1932), a Democrat, was a United States Senator representing Colorado in 1932, and a newspaperman in Grand Junction, Colorado.
- Kenneth W. Winters, a Republican member of the Kentucky State Senate, was born in Crittenden County but resides in Murray, Kentucky.
- Forrest Pogue (1912–1996), eminent military historian, a combat historian in the US Army during World War II, author of the biography of General George C. Marshall, and Director of the George C. Marshall Foundation and library in Lexington, VA.
- Shelby Hearon (1931–2016), author, recipient of fellowships from the Guggenheim Foundation, the National Endowment for the Arts, and the Ingram Merrill Foundation, winner of an American Academy of Arts and Letters Literature Award.

== See also ==
- National Register of Historic Places listings in Crittenden County, Kentucky
