= Richard Olive House =

Historic house in Kentucky, United States

- U.S. National Register of Historic Places
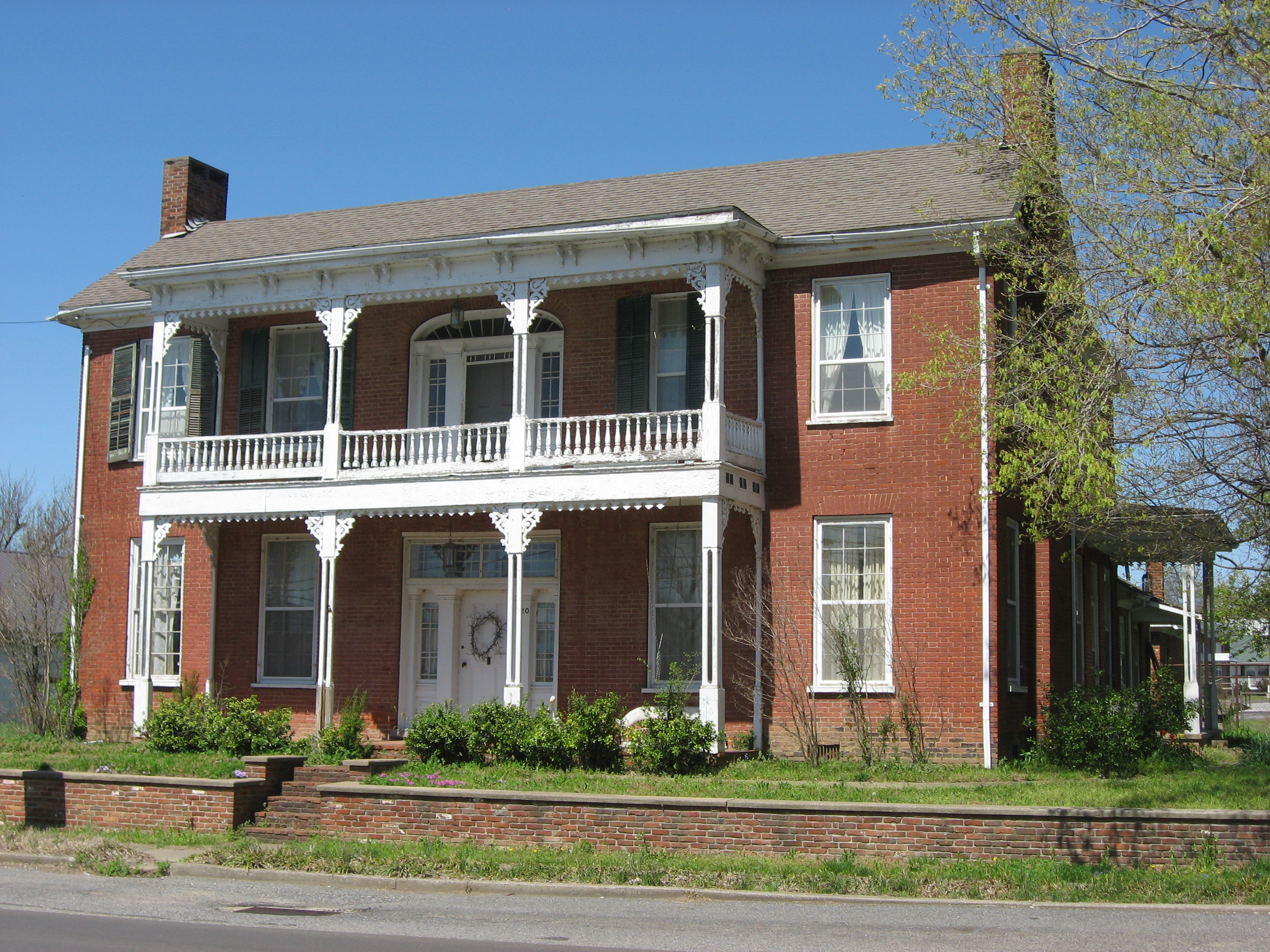

- Location within Kentucky Location within the United States
- Location: Court St., Smithland, Kentucky
- Coordinates: 37°8′22″N 88°24′14″W
- Area: 0.6 acres (0.24 ha)
- Built: 1841
- Architectural style: Greek Revival
- NRHP reference No.: 82002732
- Added to NRHP: April 29, 1982

The Richard Olive House on Court St. in Smithland in Livingston County, Kentucky, also known as Davis House, was built in about 1841. It was listed on the National Register of Historic Places in 1982.

It is a two-story five-bay brick I-house. The house "represents a transitional style, containing both Federal and Greek Revival elements. The Flemish bond brickwork evident on the front facade and the jack arches over the bays express the Federal style, while the front entrances and much of the interior trim reflect the Greek Revival."

It is located on the north side of Court Street, across from the 1845 Livingston County Courthouse, which also is NRHP-listed.
