= Jonkan, Kentucky =

- Ghost town
- Location within Kentucky
- Coordinates: 37°26′58″N 82°23′32″W
- Country: United States
- State: Kentucky
- County: Pike
- Elevation: 879 ft (268 m)
- GNIS feature ID: 2120864

Jonkan (also known as Jonican) is a ghost town in Pike County, Kentucky, United States. Jonkan was located along Jonican Branch and Jonican Road 7.2 miles (11.6 km) east-southeast of Pikeville. The community is still marked on county highway maps.
