= Thomas Lawson House =

Historic house in Kentucky, United States

- U.S. National Register of Historic Places
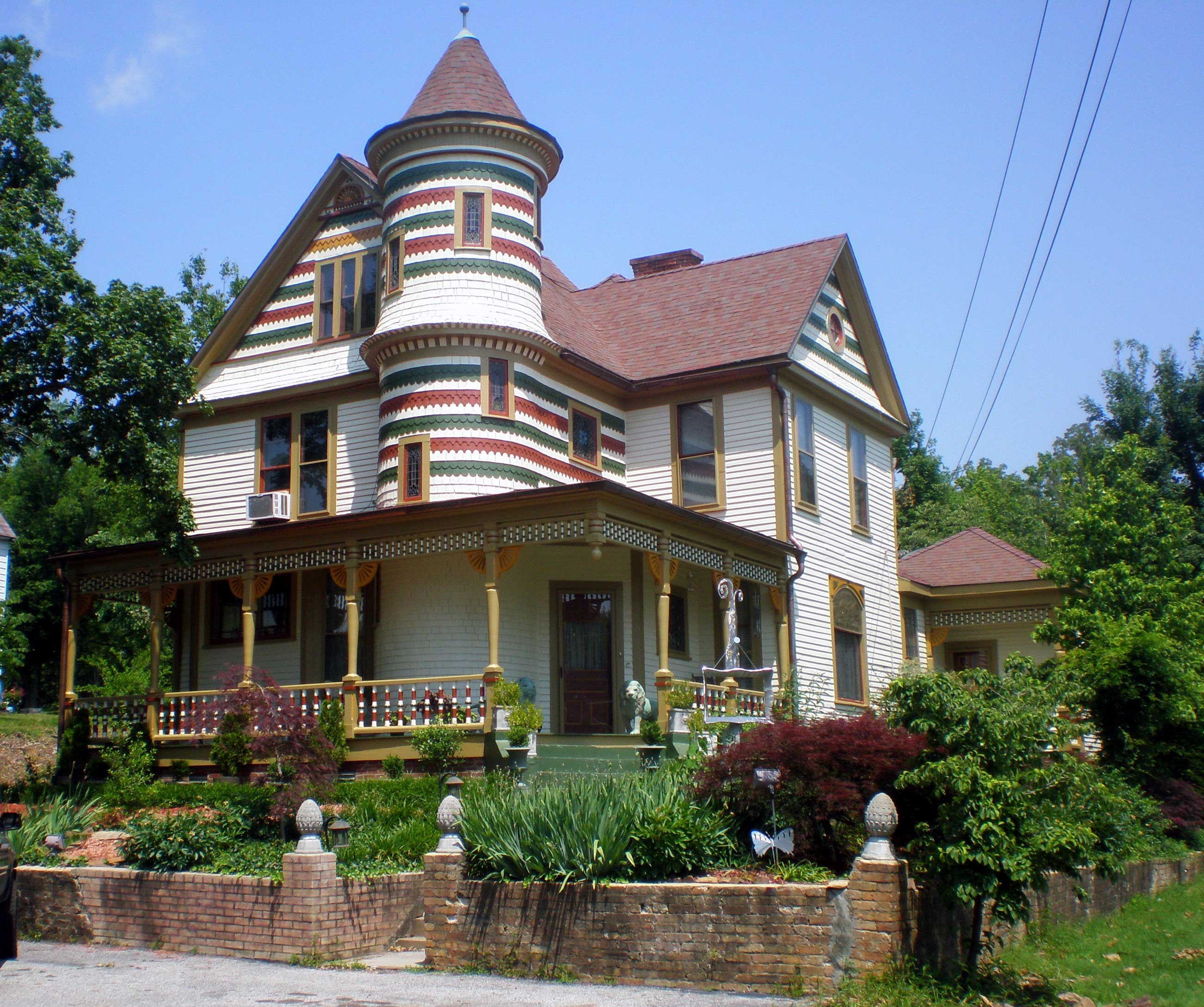

- Location within Kentucky Location within the United States
- Location: Wabash Ave., Grand Rivers, Kentucky
- Coordinates: 37°00′14″N 88°14′11″W
- Area: 0.2 acres (0.081 ha)
- Built: 1876
- Architectural style: Queen Anne
- NRHP reference No.: 78001378
- Added to NRHP: July 12, 1978

The Thomas Lawson House, a Queen Anne-style house on Wabash Ave. in Grand Rivers, Kentucky, was listed on the National Register of Historic Places in 1978.

It is a two-and-a-half-story frame house on a brick foundation. It was completed in 1876.

It was deemed notable "as one of the last and certainly the most identifiable reminders of the brief boom era of the late 19th century which resulted from the attempt to establish an iron industry in the community. This large Victorian house, the most impressive building in Grand Rivers, was constructed as a residence for Thomas Lawson, the developer responsible for the planning and construction associated with the project. Although these plans were ultimately to fail, the period was one of the most historic events in the life of this small Kentucky town."

It was the first building in Grand Rivers to have electric power, and the first to have indoor plumbing.
