= George C. Marshall Foundation =

American biographical museum

Coordinates: 37.791137°N 79.437020°W

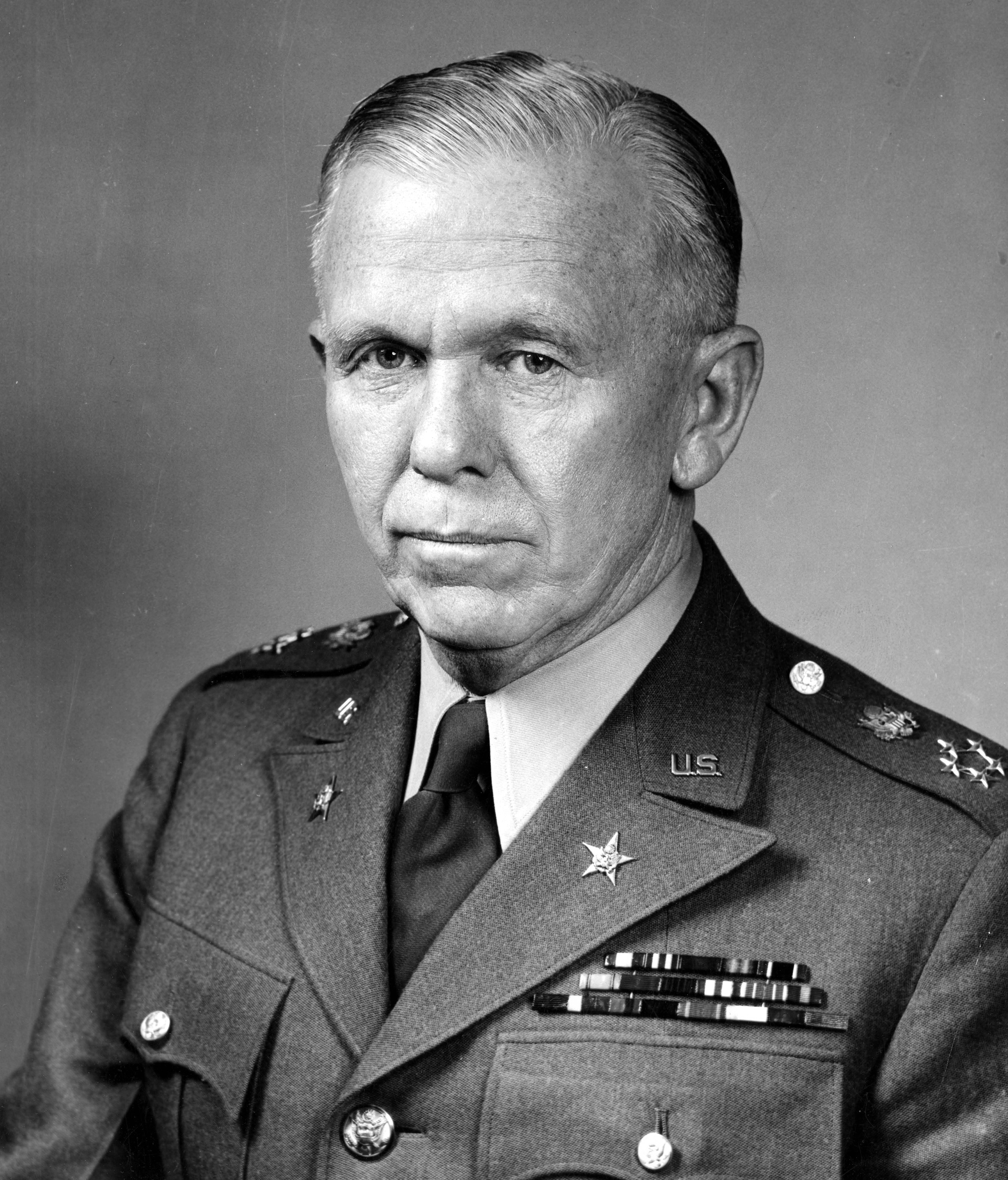
U.S. Army Chief of Staff General George C. Marshall

The George C. Marshall Foundation in Lexington, Virginia, U.S., was commissioned by President Harry S. Truman in order to preserve the papers of General George C. Marshall, who served as Army chief of staff, secretary of state and defense, and received the Nobel Peace Prize in 1953 for the Marshall Plan.

== The Foundation ==
The Foundation is located on the Post of the Virginia Military Institute, in a building containing a library, archive, and administrative offices. Dedicated on May 23, 1964, a large ceremony was held with soldiers and statesmen in attendance. Presidents Lyndon B. Johnson and Dwight D. Eisenhower spoke at the ceremony. Its first president was General Omar Bradley. Members of the original board of directors included Robert A. Lovett, Dr. Forrest C. Pogue and General Frank McCarthy.

== George C. Marshall Museum & Library ==
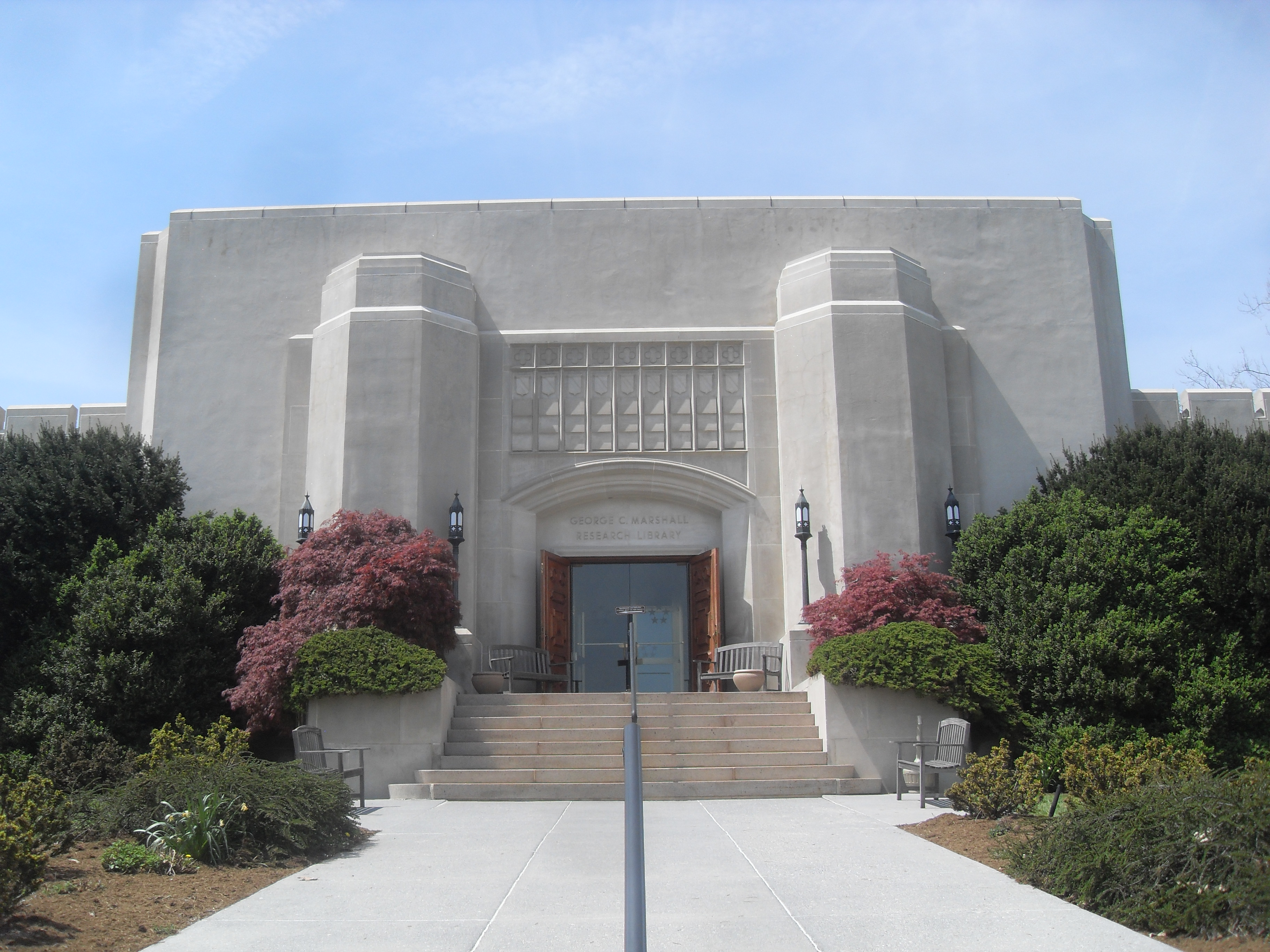
George C. Marshall Foundation building on the campus of VMI

The Marshall Museum displayed exhibits of Marshall's life and work in the entry hall and two adjacent galleries, one focused on his military career and the other on his achievements following World War II.

In August 2019 the foundation planned to renovate the museum, but this did not happen, and the museum closed in January 2021. A small collection of artifacts was kept by the Foundation, with the rest sent for permanent display at other museums.

The Marshall Research Library covers United States military and diplomatic history during Marshall's career as a military officer and public servant, from about 1900 to his death in 1959. Along with sorted paper collections, the library contains more than 23,000 manuscripts, two million documents including many from the National Archives and Records Administration, hundreds of maps, thousands of photographs, 700 posters from all countries involved in both World Wars, films, and over 250 oral histories.
