= Gower House =

Historic house in Kentucky, United States

- U.S. National Register of Historic Places
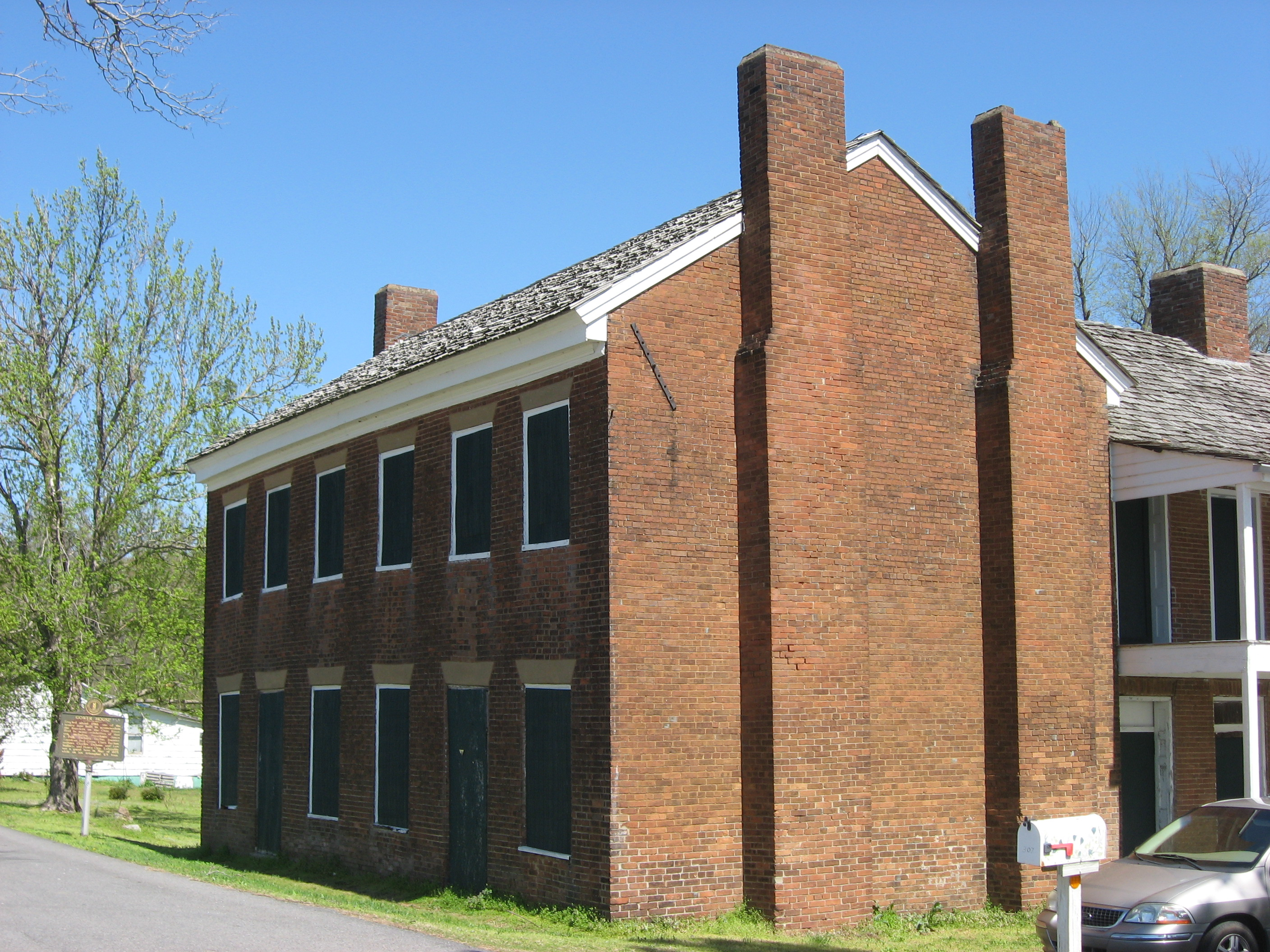

- Location within Kentucky Location within the United States
- Location: Water St., Smithland, Kentucky
- Coordinates: 37°08′35″N 88°24′20″W
- Area: 9 acres (3.6 ha)
- Built: c.1780
- Architectural style: Georgian, Federal
- NRHP reference No.: 73000815
- Added to NRHP: May 24, 1973

The Gower House, located on Water St. in Smithland, Kentucky, was built in about 1780. It was listed on the National Register of Historic Places in 1973.

It was built as an inn for travelers, on the south bank of the confluence of the Cumberland and Ohio rivers. It is built of 16 inches (0.41 m) thick brick walls.

Author Ned Buntline, who wrote about Buffalo Bill Cody and other Western stories, lived in the inn in 1845.
