= Shelby Hearon =

American novelist

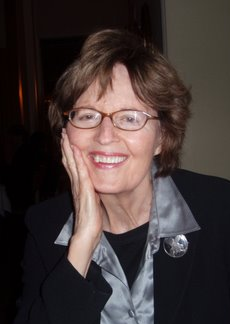
- Hearon in 2006
- Born: January 18, 1931; Marion, Kentucky, U.S.
- Died: December 10, 2016 (aged 85); Burlington, Vermont, U.S.
- Education: University of Texas at Austin (BA)
- Occupations: Novelist, short story writer
- Writing career
- Period: 1968–2016

Shelby Hearon (January 18, 1931 – December 10, 2016) was an American novelist and short story writer.

== Early life ==
Hearon was born in 1931 in Marion, Kentucky. She attended the University of Texas at Austin, graduating with a Bachelor of Arts in 1953.

== Career ==
Armadillo in the Grass, her first novel, was begun in 1962 and accepted for publication by Knopf in 1967. Hearon had a teaching career at several colleges, and served on the Texas Commission on the Arts and the New York State Council on the Arts.

== Awards and recognition ==
Hearon has been awarded fiction fellowships from the Ingram Merrill Foundation, the Guggenheim Foundation and the National Endowment for the Arts. She has received the Texas Institute of Letters award twice, and a lifetime achievement award from the Texas Book Festival. Five of her short stories were awarded NEA/PEN syndication Short Story Prizes and she received a NEA Creative Writing Fellowship. She has also received a New York Women in Communications Award.

Her novel Owning Jolene won an American Academy of Arts and Letters Literature Award.

== Bibliography ==
- Armadillo in the Grass (1968)
- The Second Dune (1973)
- Hannah's House (1975)
- Now and Another Time (1976)
- A Prince of a Fellow (1978)
- Barbara Jordan, a self portrait (1979)
- Painted Dresses (1981)
- Afternoon of a Faun (1983)
- Group Therapy (1984)
- A Small Town (1985)
- 500 Scorpions (1986)
- Owning Jolene (1989)
- Hug Dancing (1991)
- Life Estates (1994)
- Footprints (1996)
- Ella in Bloom (2001)
- Year of the Dog (2007) ISBN 978-0-292-71469-4
