= Peabody-Fordson Historic District =

Historic district in Kentucky, United States

- U.S. National Register of Historic Places
- U.S. Historic district
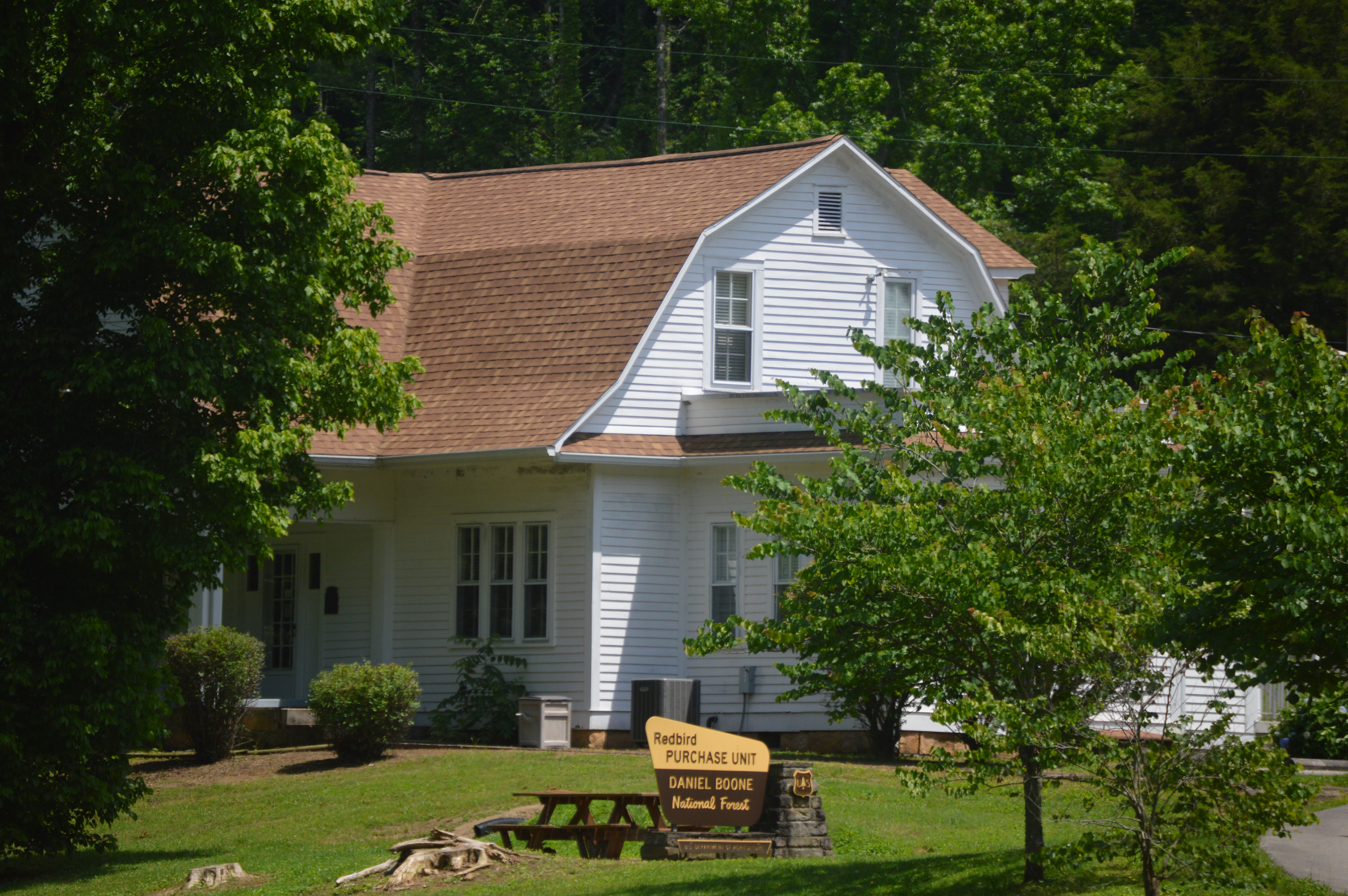

- Location within Kentucky Location within the United States
- Location: Kentucky Route 66, south of Big Creek, Kentucky
- Coordinates: 37.138889°N 83.590000°W
- Area: 23 acres (9.3 ha)
- NRHP reference No.: 89002099
- Added to NRHP: February 1, 2017

The Peabody-Fordson Historic District, at 91 Peabody Road, south of Big Creek in Clay County, Kentucky, is a historic district which was listed on the National Register of Historic Places in 2017.

It is also known as the Redbird Ranger Office Complex. It includes three contributing buildings, three contributing structures, and a contributing site, on 23 acres (9.3 ha). It also includes six non-contributing buildings and six non-contributing structures.
