= Crayne, Kentucky =

Census-designated place in Kentucky, United States

- Census-designated place
- Location within the state of Kentucky Crayne (the United States)
- Coordinates: 37°16′14″N 88°4′57″W
- Country: United States
- State: Kentucky
- County: Crittenden

Area
  - Total: 1.12 sq mi (2.90 km^{2})
  - Land: 1.12 sq mi (2.89 km^{2})
  - Water: 0.0039 sq mi (0.01 km^{2})
- Elevation: 640 ft (200 m)

Population (2020)
  - Total: 161
  - Density: 144.4/sq mi (55.75/km^{2})
- Time zone: UTC-6 (Central (CST))
  - Summer (DST): UTC-5 (CDT)
- ZIP codes: 42033
- FIPS code: 21-18190
- GNIS feature ID: 490310

Crayne is a census-designated place and unincorporated community within Crittenden County, Kentucky, United States. As of the 2020 census, Crayne had a population of 161.

== Geography ==
Crayne is located in southern Crittenden County along U.S. Route 641, which leads north 4 miles (6 km) to Marion, the county seat, and south 5 miles (8 km) to Fredonia.

== Demographics ==
Historical population
Census	Pop.	Note	%±
2020	161		—
U.S. Decennial Census
