= Livingston County Courthouse and Clerk's Offices =

- U.S. National Register of Historic Places
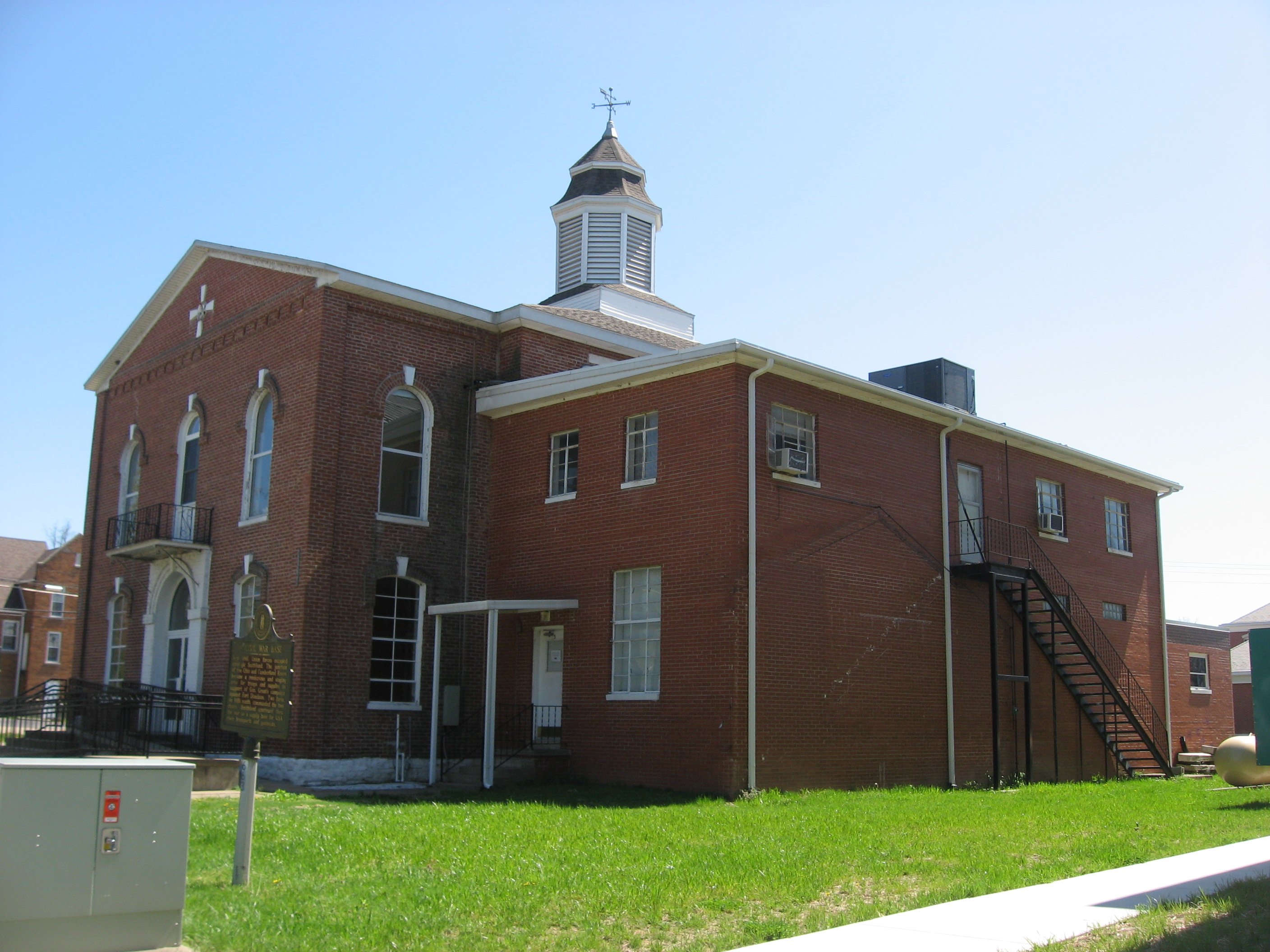

- Location within Kentucky Location within the United States
- Location: 351 Court St., Smithland, Kentucky
- Coordinates: 37°08′22″N 88°24′16″W
- Area: 1.1 acres (0.45 ha)
- Built: 1845
- Architect: Preston Grace
- Architectural style: Greek Revival, Romanesque
- NRHP reference No.: 11000794
- Added to NRHP: November 10, 2011

The Livingston County Courthouse and Clerk's Offices, at 351 Court St. in Smithland, Kentucky, was listed on the National Register of Historic Places in 2011. It designed by Preston Grace in the Greek Revival and Romanesque architectural styles and built in 1845. There are two associated buildings.
