= Frances, Kentucky =

Unincorporated community in Kentucky, United States

Frances
- Unincorporated community
- Location within the state of Kentucky Frances (the United States)
- Coordinates: 37°13′11″N 88°8′28″W
- Country: United States
- State: Kentucky
- County: Crittenden
- Elevation: 548 ft (167 m)
- Time zone: UTC-6 (Central (CST))
  - Summer (DST): UTC-5 (CDT)
- GNIS feature ID: 492431

Frances is an unincorporated community within Crittenden County, Kentucky, United States. It has an elevation of 548 feet. Frances was also called Needmore.
