= Weston, Kentucky =

Unincorporated community in Kentucky, United States

Weston
- Unincorporated community
- Location within the state of Kentucky
- Coordinates: 37°28′21″N 88°4′22″W
- Country: United States
- State: Kentucky
- County: Crittenden
- Elevation: 361 ft (110 m)
- Time zone: UTC-6 (Central (CST))
  - Summer (DST): UTC-5 (CST)
- GNIS ID: 516282

Weston is an unincorporated community in Crittenden County, Kentucky, United States.

Weston was incorporated in 1868, and became a shipping point on the Ohio River. Its post office closed in 1916.
