= Smithland, Kentucky =

- City
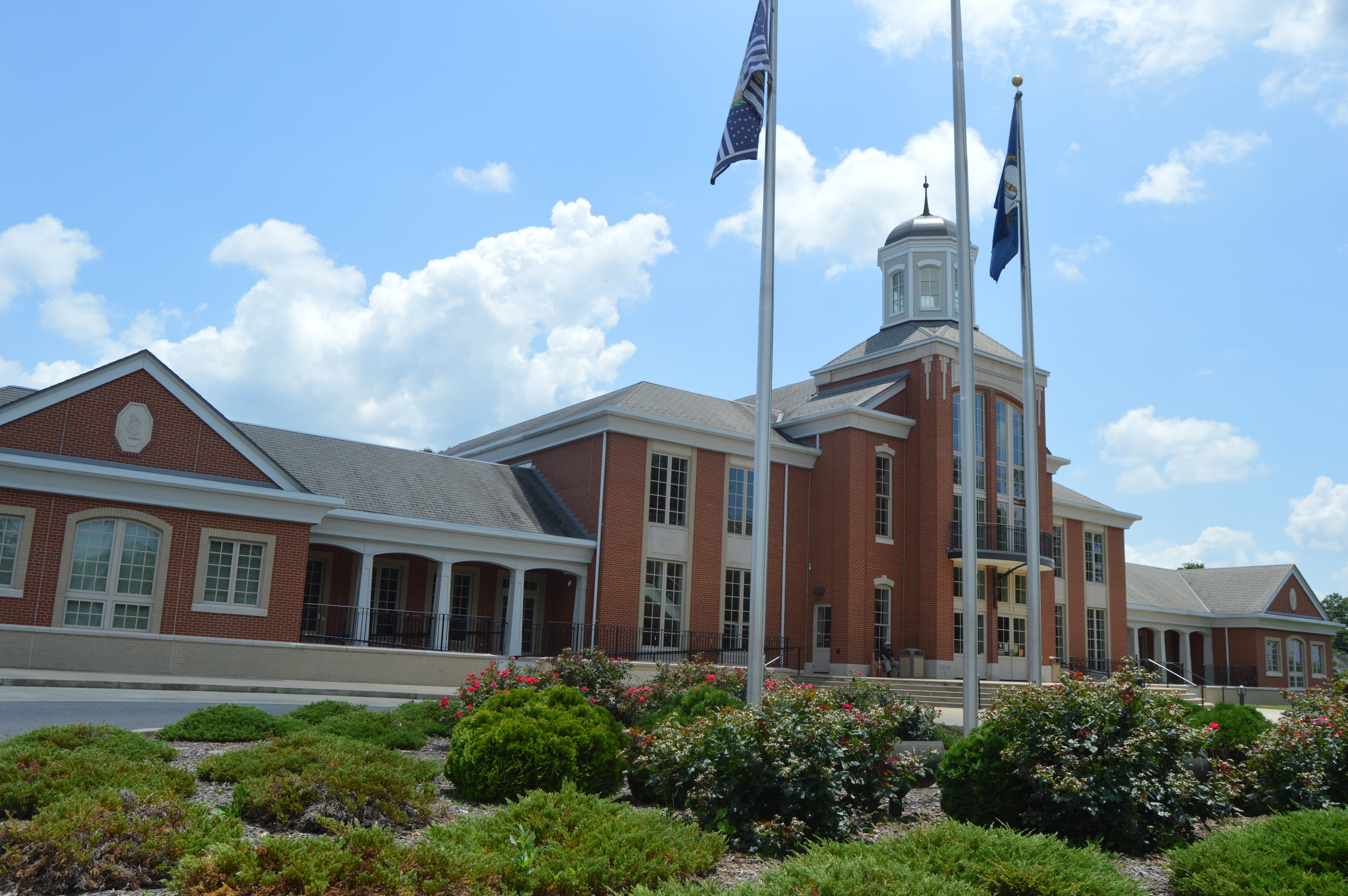
- Current Livingston County Courthouse

- Location of Smithland in Livingston County, Kentucky.
- Coordinates: 37°08′19″N 88°24′14″W
- Country: United States
- State: Kentucky
- County: Livingston

Area
  - Total: 0.51 sq mi (1.31 km^{2})
  - Land: 0.51 sq mi (1.31 km^{2})
  - Water: 0 sq mi (0.00 km^{2})
- Elevation: 345 ft (105 m)

Population (2020)
  - Total: 240
  - Density: 474.0/sq mi (183.02/km^{2})
- Time zone: UTC-6 (Central (CST))
  - Summer (DST): UTC-5 (CDT)
- ZIP code: 42081
- Area codes: 270 & 364
- FIPS code: 21-71382
- GNIS feature ID: 2405474
- Website: https://cityofsmithlandky.com/

Smithland is a home rule-class city in Livingston County, Kentucky, United States, at the confluence of the Ohio and Cumberland Rivers. As of the 2020 census, Smithland had a population of 240. It is the county seat of Livingston County.

Smithland is part of the Paducah metropolitan area.

== Historic sites ==
The Gower House built in about 1780 is located in Smithland. It was listed on the National Register of Historic Places in 1973. It was built as an inn for travelers, on the south bank of the confluence of the Cumberland and Ohio rivers.

The Richard Olive House built in about 1841 is also located in Smithland.

== Geography ==
According to the United States Census Bureau, the city has a total area of 0.6 square miles (1.6 km^{2}), all land.

=== Climate ===
Climate data for Smithland, Kentucky (Smithland Lock and Dam) (1991–2020 normals, extremes 1981–present)
Month	Jan	Feb	Mar	Apr	May	Jun	Jul	Aug	Sep	Oct	Nov	Dec	Year
Record high °F (°C)	72 (22)	78 (26)	88 (31)	90 (32)	95 (35)	106 (41)	104 (40)	104 (40)	100 (38)	94 (34)	83 (28)	78 (26)	106 (41)
Mean maximum °F (°C)	64.0 (17.8)	69.0 (20.6)	76.9 (24.9)	82.9 (28.3)	88.1 (31.2)	93.7 (34.3)	95.9 (35.5)	96.0 (35.6)	92.4 (33.6)	84.8 (29.3)	75.2 (24.0)	65.6 (18.7)	97.4 (36.3)
Mean daily maximum °F (°C)	42.8 (6.0)	46.9 (8.3)	56.7 (13.7)	68.1 (20.1)	76.8 (24.9)	84.6 (29.2)	87.9 (31.1)	87.3 (30.7)	81.2 (27.3)	70.1 (21.2)	57.0 (13.9)	46.4 (8.0)	67.1 (19.5)
Daily mean °F (°C)	34.2 (1.2)	37.7 (3.2)	46.7 (8.2)	57.0 (13.9)	66.3 (19.1)	74.7 (23.7)	78.3 (25.7)	77.2 (25.1)	70.5 (21.4)	58.7 (14.8)	46.8 (8.2)	37.8 (3.2)	57.2 (14.0)
Mean daily minimum °F (°C)	25.7 (−3.5)	28.4 (−2.0)	36.6 (2.6)	46.0 (7.8)	55.8 (13.2)	64.7 (18.2)	68.6 (20.3)	67.0 (19.4)	59.7 (15.4)	47.2 (8.4)	36.5 (2.5)	29.3 (−1.5)	47.1 (8.4)
Mean minimum °F (°C)	8.0 (−13.3)	10.9 (−11.7)	19.9 (−6.7)	30.8 (−0.7)	41.7 (5.4)	54.1 (12.3)	60.3 (15.7)	58.0 (14.4)	45.1 (7.3)	31.7 (−0.2)	21.2 (−6.0)	12.4 (−10.9)	4.0 (−15.6)
Record low °F (°C)	−16 (−27)	−6 (−21)	−6 (−21)	18 (−8)	35 (2)	45 (7)	52 (11)	44 (7)	35 (2)	22 (−6)	12 (−11)	−12 (−24)	−16 (−27)
Average precipitation inches (mm)	3.71 (94)	4.10 (104)	4.78 (121)	5.07 (129)	4.56 (116)	4.30 (109)	4.26 (108)	2.79 (71)	3.57 (91)	3.61 (92)	4.19 (106)	4.35 (110)	49.29 (1,252)
Average snowfall inches (cm)	0.4 (1.0)	1.2 (3.0)	0.4 (1.0)	0.0 (0.0)	0.0 (0.0)	0.0 (0.0)	0.0 (0.0)	0.0 (0.0)	0.0 (0.0)	0.0 (0.0)	0.0 (0.0)	1.8 (4.6)	3.8 (9.7)
Average precipitation days (≥ 0.01 in)	10.0	9.3	11.4	10.9	11.4	8.8	8.1	6.6	6.5	7.2	9.0	10.2	109.4
Average snowy days (≥ 0.1 in)	0.6	0.8	0.1	0.0	0.0	0.0	0.0	0.0	0.0	0.0	0.0	1.1	2.6
Source: NOAA

== Demographics ==
Historical population
Census	Pop.	Note	%±
1810	99		—
1850	882		—
1860	805		−8.7%
1870	690		−14.3%
1880	570		−17.4%
1890	541		−5.1%
1900	579		7.0%
1910	557		−3.8%
1920	559		0.4%
1930	519		−7.2%
1940	592		14.1%
1950	498		−15.9%
1960	541		8.6%
1970	514		−5.0%
1980	512		−0.4%
1990	384		−25.0%
2000	401		4.4%
2010	301		−24.9%
2020	240		−20.3%
U.S. Decennial Census

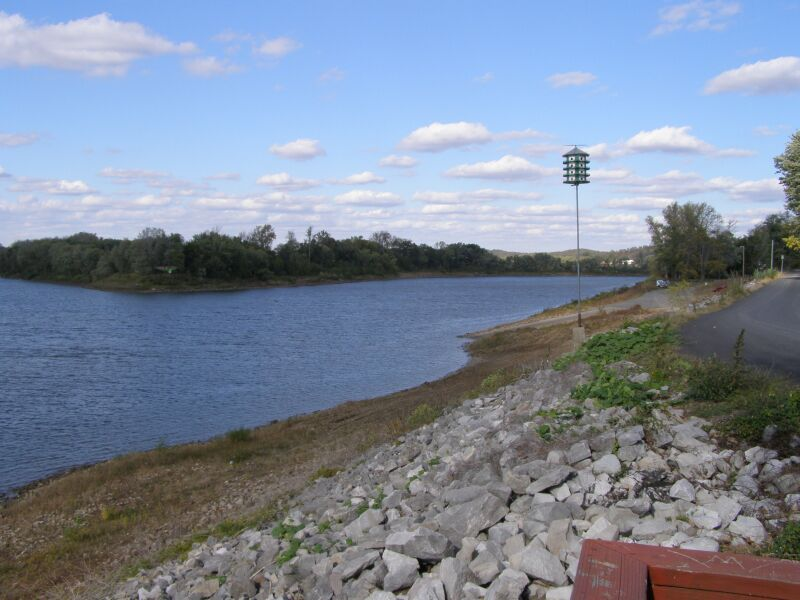
Mouth of the Cumberland River

As of the census of 2000, there were 401 people, 157 households, and 105 families residing in the city. The population density was 647.7 inhabitants per square mile (250.1/km^{2}). There were 188 housing units at an average density of 303.7 per square mile (117.3/km^{2}). The racial makeup of the city was 98.75% White, 0.25% African American, 0.75% from other races, and 0.25% from two or more races. Hispanic or Latino of any race were 0.75% of the population.

There were 157 households, out of which 24.2% had children under the age of 18 living with them, 50.3% were married couples living together, 12.7% had a female householder with no husband present, and 33.1% were non-families. 28.7% of all households were made up of individuals, and 15.9% had someone living alone who was 65 years of age or older. The average household size was 2.22 and the average family size was 2.72.

In the city, the population was spread out, with 16.0% under the age of 18, 7.0% from 18 to 24, 25.7% from 25 to 44, 23.9% from 45 to 64, and 27.4% who were 65 years of age or older. The median age was 46 years. For every 100 females, there were 91.0 males. For every 100 females age 18 and over, there were 95.9 males.

The median income for a household in the city was $30,000, and the median income for a family was $40,568. Males had a median income of $28,281 versus $16,167 for females. The per capita income for the city was $16,751. About 7.1% of families and 9.0% of the population were below the poverty line, including 7.7% of those under age 18 and 12.0% of those age 65 or over.

== Education ==
Public education in Smithland is administered by Livingston County Schools, which operates Livingston Central High School.

Smithland has a lending library, the Livingston County Public Library.

== Notable people ==
- Carter W. Clarke U.S. Army General who oversaw the post-war investigation in the intelligence around the Pearl Harbor Attack.

== See also ==
- List of cities and towns along the Ohio River
