= Marion, Kentucky =

- City
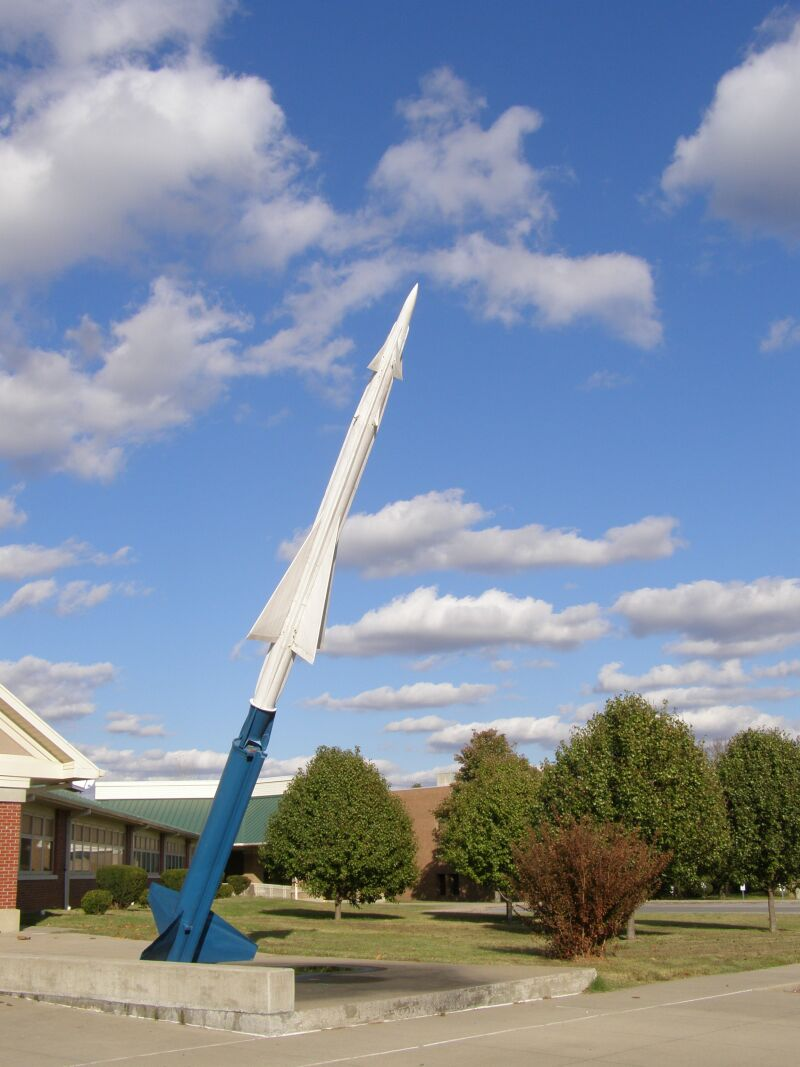
- Nike Ajax located at the Middle School

- Flag
- Motto: "Kentucky's Hidden Treasure"
- Location of Marion in Crittenden County, Kentucky.
- Coordinates: 37°19′57″N 88°4′45″W
- Country: United States
- State: Kentucky
- County: Crittenden
- Incorporated: 1842
- Reïncorporated: 1851
- Named for: Brig. Gen. Francis Marion

Area
  - Total: 3.35 sq mi (8.68 km^{2})
  - Land: 3.32 sq mi (8.61 km^{2})
  - Water: 0.027 sq mi (0.07 km^{2})
- Elevation: 594 ft (181 m)

Population (2020)
  - Total: 2,916
  - Estimate (2024): 2,876
  - Density: 876.9/sq mi (338.57/km^{2})
- Time zone: UTC-6 (Central (CST))
  - Summer (DST): UTC-5 (CDT)
- ZIP code: 42064
- Area code: 270
- FIPS code: 21-50034
- GNIS feature ID: 0497543
- Website: www.marionky.gov

Marion is a home rule-class city in Crittenden County, Kentucky, in the United States. It is the seat of its county. As of the 2020 census, Marion had a population of 2,916.

The farm communities surrounding Marion are home to a large Amish population. The Marion-Crittenden County Airport is located west of the city.

== History ==
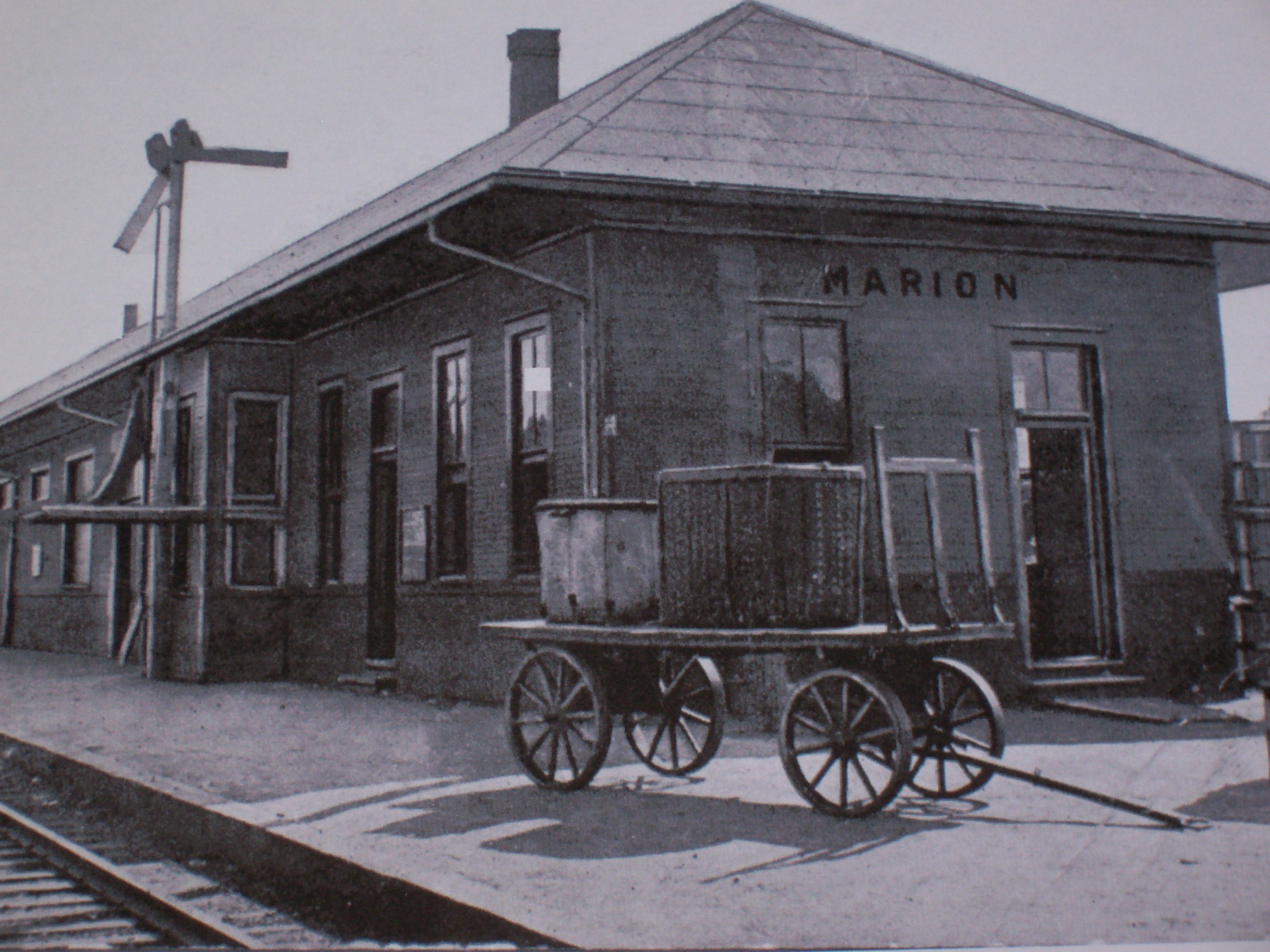
Illinois Central Railroad depot, c. 1890

The city is named for Francis Marion, a brigadier general from South Carolina in the American Revolutionary War.

Marion was founded in 1842 on land donated by Dr. John S. Gilliam shortly after Crittenden County was created January 26, 1842, from a portion of Livingston County. The city was incorporated February 22, 1844, and a post office was established in 1846.

In 1864, at the end of the Civil War, the county courthouse in Marion was burned.

A railroad line from Blackford to Princeton was completed in 1887, and a depot was established at Marion. Originally owned by the Illinois Central Railroad, it has since been abandoned.

A one-room Rosenwald School opened in Marion in 1926 for African-American children. Graduates attended high school in neighboring Caldwell County until 1936, after which they attended high school in Princeton.

== Geography ==
Marion is located near the center of Crittenden County at 37°19′57″N 88°4′45″W (37.332505, -88.079051). U.S. 60 and U.S. 641 intersect in the center of town. U.S. 60 leads northeast 30 miles (48 km) to Morganfield and southwest 45 miles (72 km) to Paducah, while U.S. 641 leads south 10 miles (16 km) to Fredonia and 20 miles (32 km) to U.S. 62 in Eddyville.

According to the United States Census Bureau, Marion has a total area of 3.4 square miles (8.7 km^{2}), of which 0.03 square miles (0.07 km^{2}), or 0.79%, is water.

== Demographics ==
Historical population
Census	Pop.	Note	%±
1870	102		—
1880	833		716.7%
1890	840		0.8%
1900	1,064		26.7%
1910	1,627		52.9%
1920	1,718		5.6%
1930	1,892		10.1%
1940	2,163		14.3%
1950	2,375		9.8%
1960	2,468		3.9%
1970	3,008		21.9%
1980	3,392		12.8%
1990	3,320		−2.1%
2000	3,196		−3.7%
2010	3,039		−4.9%
2020	2,916		−4.0%
2024 (est.)	2,876		−1.4%
U.S. Decennial Census

=== 2020 census ===
As of the 2020 census, Marion had a population of 2,916. The median age was 42.4 years. 20.5% of residents were under the age of 18 and 20.9% of residents were 65 years of age or older. For every 100 females there were 96.1 males, and for every 100 females age 18 and over there were 91.6 males age 18 and over.

0.0% of residents lived in urban areas, while 100.0% lived in rural areas.

There were 1,188 households in Marion, of which 29.6% had children under the age of 18 living in them. Of all households, 34.3% were married-couple households, 19.9% were households with a male householder and no spouse or partner present, and 36.9% were households with a female householder and no spouse or partner present. About 36.2% of all households were made up of individuals and 17.8% had someone living alone who was 65 years of age or older.

There were 1,434 housing units, of which 17.2% were vacant. The homeowner vacancy rate was 2.2% and the rental vacancy rate was 10.2%.

Racial composition as of the 2020 census
Race	Number	Percent
White	2,691	92.3%
Black or African American	64	2.2%
American Indian and Alaska Native	3	0.1%
Asian	4	0.1%
Native Hawaiian and Other Pacific Islander	2	0.1%
Some other race	23	0.8%
Two or more races	129	4.4%
Hispanic or Latino (of any race)	57	2.0%

=== 2000 census ===
As of the census of 2000, there were 3,196 people, 1,415 households, and 881 families residing in the city. The population density was 971.7 inhabitants per square mile (375.2/km^{2}). There were 1,595 housing units at an average density of 484.9 per square mile (187.2/km^{2}). The racial makeup of the city was 96.65% White, 1.75% African American, 0.19% Native American, 0.03% Asian, 0.28% from other races, and 1.10% from two or more races. Hispanic or Latino of any race were 0.84% of the population.

There were 1,415 households, out of which 25.8% had children under the age of 18 living with them, 46.0% were married couples living together, 12.9% had a female householder with no husband present, and 37.7% were non-families. 35.5% of all households were made up of individuals, and 19.6% had someone living alone who was 65 years of age or older. The average household size was 2.17 and the average family size was 2.79.

In the city, the population was spread out, with 20.4% under the age of 18, 7.8% from 18 to 24, 24.8% from 25 to 44, 24.4% from 45 to 64, and 22.7% who were 65 years of age or older. The median age was 42 years. For every 100 females, there were 81.2 males. For every 100 females age 18 and over, there were 77.9 males.

The median income for a household in the city was $23,854, and the median income for a family was $33,980. Males had a median income of $26,628 versus $18,646 for females. The per capita income for the city was $14,766. About 20.2% of families and 24.3% of the population were below the poverty line, including 36.5% of those under age 18 and 15.8% of those age 65 or over.

== Arts and culture ==
The internationally known Ben E. Clement Mineral Museum is located in Marion. Its collection of fluorite crystal specimens is significant, and a reflection of Crittenden County's importance in the history of fluorite mining.

Crittenden County Historical Museum is the repository of local history dating to prior to the county's creation.

Community Arts Foundation hosts, produces and cultivates the local arts, including various performances at historic Fohs Hall.

Marion was home to the Marion Bobcats, a wood bat baseball team in the KIT League and subsequent Ohio Valley Summer Collegiate Baseball League, from 2008 to 2013.

The Holiday Drive-In Theater was located east of Marion, and had a 200-car capacity. It has since been demolished. There was also once a traditional theater and open-air theater.

== Education ==
Public education in Marion is administered by Crittenden County Schools. Crittenden County Elementary School, Middle School and High School are all located in Marion.

Marion has a lending library, the Crittenden County Public Library.

== Notable people ==
- Lee Cruce (1863–1933), second governor of Oklahoma
- Shelby Hearon (1931–2016), novelist and short story writer
- Ollie Murray James (1871–1918), represented Kentucky in the United States House of Representatives and the United States Senate
- Walter Walker (1883–1932), U.S. senator representing Colorado in 1932, and a newspaperman in Grand Junction, Colorado
- Floyd "Rip" Wheeler (1921–1968), professional baseball player

== Climate ==
The climate in this area is characterized by hot, humid summers and generally mild to cool winters. According to the Köppen Climate Classification system, Marion has a humid subtropical climate, abbreviated "Cfa" on climate maps.
