= National Register of Historic Places listings in Christian County, Kentucky =

Location of Christian County in Kentucky

This is a list of the National Register of Historic Places listings in Christian County, Kentucky.

This is intended to be a complete list of the properties and districts on the National Register of Historic Places in Christian County, Kentucky, United States. The locations of National Register properties and districts for which the latitude and longitude coordinates are included below, may be seen in a map.

There are 51 properties and districts listed on the National Register in the county.

This National Park Service list is complete through NPS recent listings posted November 13, 2025.

== Current listings ==
	Name on the Register	Image	Date listed	Location	City or town	Description
1	Alumni-Latham-Mooreland Historic District	Alumni-Latham-Mooreland Historic District	July 22, 1993 (#93000696)	Alumni Ave., Latham Ave., and Mooreland Dr. 36°51′15″N 87°29′47″W	Hopkinsville	
2	Attucks High School	Attucks High School	January 23, 2013 (#12001199)	712 E. 1st. St. 36°52′08″N 87°28′41″W	Hopkinsville	
3	C.A. Baldwin Farmstead		September 29, 2015 (#15000648)	2680 Masonville-Beverly Rd. 36°45′54″N 87°30′57″W	Hopkinsville	
4	Beverly School		April 30, 1979 (#79003624)	Off Kentucky Route 107; 36°45′43″N 87°31′29″W	Hopkinsville	
5	Blue Lantern Farm		April 30, 1979 (#79003626)	U.S. Route 68; 36°52′25″N 87°31′18″W	Hopkinsville	
6	Boatright House		April 30, 1979 (#79003611)	Off U.S. Route 41; 36°50′49″N 87°26′55″W	Hopkinsville	
7	Bradshaw House		April 30, 1979 (#79003623)	Off Kentucky Route 107; 36°45′44″N 87°31′19″W	Hopkinsville	
8	Campbell House		April 30, 1979 (#79003627)	Junction of Kentucky Routes 164 and 272; 36°51′30″N 87°33′49″W	Hopkinsville	
9	Cedar Grove	Cedar Grove	November 17, 1977 (#77000608)	East of Oak Grove off Kentucky Route 115; 36°39′15″N 87°22′36″W	Oak Grove	
10	Church Hill Grange Hall		August 28, 1975 (#75000744)	5.5 miles (8.9 km) southwest of Hopkinsville on Cox Mill Rd. (Kentucky Route 695); 36°47′58″N 87°34′28″W	Hopkinsville	
11	Confederate Memorial Fountain in Hopkinsville	Confederate Memorial Fountain in Hopkinsville	July 17, 1997 (#97000710)	3 blocks north of the junction of U.S. Route 41 and Main St. 36°52′00″N 87°29′17″W	Hopkinsville	
12	Cox House		April 30, 1979 (#79003615)	South of Kentucky Route 272; 36°49′06″N 87°40′22″W	Julien	
13	Judge Joseph Crockett House	Judge Joseph Crockett House	April 3, 1979 (#79000968)	317 E. 16th St. 36°51′38″N 87°29′18″W	Hopkinsville	
14	Dalton Brick Company		April 30, 1979 (#79003606)	N. Elm St. 36°52′26″N 87°29′25″W	Hopkinsville	
15	Monroe Dalton House	Monroe Dalton House	February 10, 1983 (#83002624)	713 E. 7th St. 36°51′49″N 87°28′56″W	Hopkinsville	
16	East 7th Street Historic District	East 7th Street Historic District	September 7, 1983 (#83000561)	Roughly bounded by E. 7th St. from Campbell to Belmont Sts. 36°51′49″N 87°28′52″W	Hopkinsville	
17	Elk Grove Farm		April 30, 1979 (#79003613)	Off U.S. Route 41A; 36°45′37″N 87°27′37″W	Hopkinsville	
18	Elliott Place		April 30, 1979 (#79003617)	North of Lafayette Rd. 36°39′31″N 87°37′43″W	LaFayette	
19	Fairelond	Fairelond	September 7, 1983 (#83000562)	1303 E. 7th St. 36°51′45″N 87°28′29″W	Hopkinsville	Spelled "Fairlelond" on the nomination form.
20	Freeman Chapel C.M.E. Church	Freeman Chapel C.M.E. Church	May 26, 1983 (#83000563)	137 S. Virginia St. 36°52′08″N 87°29′08″W	Hopkinsville	
21	Simon French House		April 30, 1979 (#79003622)	Carter Rd., South of Barkers Mill; 36°39′10″N 87°21′32″W	Hensleytown	
22	John C. Gary House		April 30, 1979 (#79003629)	Gary Lane, south of Kentucky Route 695; 36°48′45″N 87°31′45″W	Hopkinsville	
23	Genoa		April 30, 1979 (#79003619)	Palmyra Rd. 36°43′09″N 87°31′54″W	Howel	
24	Glen Burnie	Glen Burnie	April 30, 1979 (#79003618)	Bumpus Mill Rd. 36°41′00″N 87°23′30″W	Hopkinsville	
25	Grace Episcopal Church	Grace Episcopal Church	January 28, 1982 (#82002679)	220 E. 6th St. 36°51′59″N 87°29′09″W	Hopkinsville	
26	E.H. Higgins House	E.H. Higgins House	January 3, 1984 (#84001403)	1530 E. 7th St. 36°51′55″N 87°28′08″W	Hopkinsville	
27	Hopkinsville Commercial Historic District	Hopkinsville Commercial Historic District	April 30, 1979 (#79003633)	Roughly bounded by the L&N railroad line and 10th, 5th, and Bethel Sts. 36°51′56″N 87°29′13″W	Hopkinsville	
28	Hopkinsville L & N Railroad Depot	Hopkinsville L & N Railroad Depot	August 1, 1975 (#75000745)	425 E. 9th St. 36°51′49″N 87°29′07″W	Hopkinsville	
29	Hopkinsville Residential Historic District	Hopkinsville Residential Historic District	April 30, 1979 (#79003631)	Roughly bounded by 14th, 20th, Main, and Virginia Sts.; also the southwestern corner of Main and 13th Sts. 36°51′38″N 87°29′30″W	Hopkinsville	Second address represents a boundary increase
30	Hopkinsville Warehouse Historic District	Hopkinsville Warehouse Historic District	April 30, 1979 (#79003632)	Roughly along Harrison St. and railroad tracks from 2nd to 21st Sts. 36°51′32″N 87°29′11″W	Hopkinsville	
31	Hopper Court	Hopper Court	April 30, 1979 (#79003605)	Hopper Ct. 36°51′27″N 87°29′24″W	Hopkinsville	
32	J.B. Knight House	J.B. Knight House	April 30, 1979 (#79003607)	1417 E. 7th St. 36°51′32″N 87°29′11″W	Hopkinsville	
33	Lafayette Methodist Church	Lafayette Methodist Church	April 30, 1979 (#79003616)	Off Kentucky Route 107; 36°39′36″N 87°39′33″W	LaFayette	
34	Latham Confederate Monument	Latham Confederate Monument	July 17, 1997 (#97000709)	Riverside Cemetery, west of Hopkinsville between U.S. Route 41 and L&N railroad tracks. 36°52′31″N 87°28′53″W	Hopkinsville	
35	Maplewood		April 30, 1979 (#79003625)	Off Mason Lane; 36°44′21″N 87°20′28″W	Pembroke	
36	McClellen House		April 30, 1979 (#79003621)	Kentucky Route 508; 36°53′13″N 87°20′00″W	Honey Grove	
37	McRay Site (15CH139)		February 3, 1983 (#83002625)	Address Restricted	Hopkinsville	
38	Dr. Bankie Oliver and Mamie Moore House	Dr. Bankie Oliver and Mamie Moore House	September 22, 2025 (#100012238)	1030 East 4th Street; 36°51′49″N 87°28′35″W	Hopkinsville	
39	Oakland/Henry House		April 30, 1979 (#79003628)	Kentucky Route 164; 36°49′04″N 87°36′05″W	Hopkinsville	
40	Pilot Rock Petroglyphs (15CH200)		September 8, 1989 (#89001179)	Address Restricted	Hopkinsville	
41	Poston House	Poston House	April 30, 1979 (#79003608)	809 Hayes St. 36°52′02″N 87°28′41″W	Hopkinsville	
42	Rich Grove		April 30, 1979 (#79003610)	Off Kentucky Route 109, north of Highway 1027; 36°46′22″N 87°26′13″W	Hopkinsville	
43	Ritter House		April 30, 1979 (#79003609)	Off U.S. Route 41A; 36°49′41″N 87°28′56″W	Hopkinsville	Demolished, apartments built on site.
44	St. Elmo School	St. Elmo School	December 28, 2023 (#100009724)	12225 Bradshaw Road; 36°42′15″N 87°24′12″W	Pembroke	Consolidated one room schoolhouse built in 1895
45	Smokehouse on Riverside Creek		January 8, 1987 (#87000166)	Petsch Ln. off Kentucky Route 272; 36°51′51″N 87°34′50″W	Hopkinsville	
46	Dr. Edward S. Stewart House	Dr. Edward S. Stewart House	April 30, 1979 (#79003620)	U.S. Route 68; 36°50′34″N 87°18′10″W	Fairview	Now used as a quilt shop.
47	E.W. Walker House	E.W. Walker House	September 7, 1983 (#83000564)	1414 E. 7th St. 36°51′52″N 87°28′18″W	Hopkinsville	
48	Western Lunatic Asylum	Western Lunatic Asylum	April 30, 1979 (#79003612)	U.S. Route 68; 36°51′54″N 87°27′04″W	Hopkinsville	
49	Whitepath and Fly Smith Gravesite	Whitepath and Fly Smith Gravesite	November 26, 2004 (#04001250)	U.S. Route 41; 36°51′11″N 87°28′14″W	Hopkinsville	
50	Woodlawn		April 30, 1979 (#79003614)	Off U.S. Route 41A; 36°46′09″N 87°27′38″W	Hopkinsville	
51	Frank K. Yost House	Frank K. Yost House	September 7, 1983 (#83000565)	1131 E. 7th St. 36°51′44″N 87°28′35″W	Hopkinsville	

== See also ==
- List of National Historic Landmarks in Kentucky
- National Register of Historic Places listings in Kentucky
