= Boatwright =

Boatwright is a surname of English origin, meaning boat builder. It is frequently spelt Boatright without the "w". The name may refer to:

- Bennie Boatwright (born 1996), American Basketball player
- Bon Boatwright (born 1951) American Professional Football player
- Brad Boatright (born 1976), American musician, record producer, and mastering engineer
- Brian Boatright (born 1962), justice of the Colorado Supreme Court
- Daniel E. Boatwright (1930–2012), American politician from California; state legislator 1973–96
- Danni Boatwright (born 1975), American beauty queen, model, and TV personality
- Frederic W. Boatwright (1868–1951), American college president
- Helen Boatwright (1916–2010), American soprano who specialized in the performance of American song
- Jim Boatwright (1951–2013), American-Israeli basketball player
- John B. Boatwright (1881–1965), Virginia lawyer and legislator
- John Boatright (1923–2006), American painter
- Kenneth Boatright (born 1990), American football defensive end
- Mary T. Boatwright (born 1952), American professor of classical studies
- McHenry Boatwright (1928–1994), American operatic bass-baritone and singing teacher
- Peter Boatwright, American non-fiction writer and an associate professor of marketing at the Tepper School of Business at Carnegie Mellon University
- Ryan Boatright (born 1992), American professional basketball player
- Todd Boatwright (born 1965), American weekday morning television news anchor on Spectrum News 1 Texas.

Fictional

- August, June and May Boatwright, fictional three sisters of the Sue Monk Kidd's novel The Secret Life of Bees
- Ruth Anne "Bone" Boatwright is the fictional narrator of Dorothy Allison's debut novel Bastard out of Carolina

== See also ==
- Boatright House, Kentucky, US
- Botwright, surname
