= UHA =

UHA may refer to:

- Ukrainian Galician Army
- Union Hispano Americana
- University Heights Academy
- University of Upper Alsace
- Up Helly Aa, a number of fire festivals held in Shetland, Scotland
