= COVID-19 pandemic in Kentucky =

Ongoing COVID-19 viral pandemic in Kentucky, United States

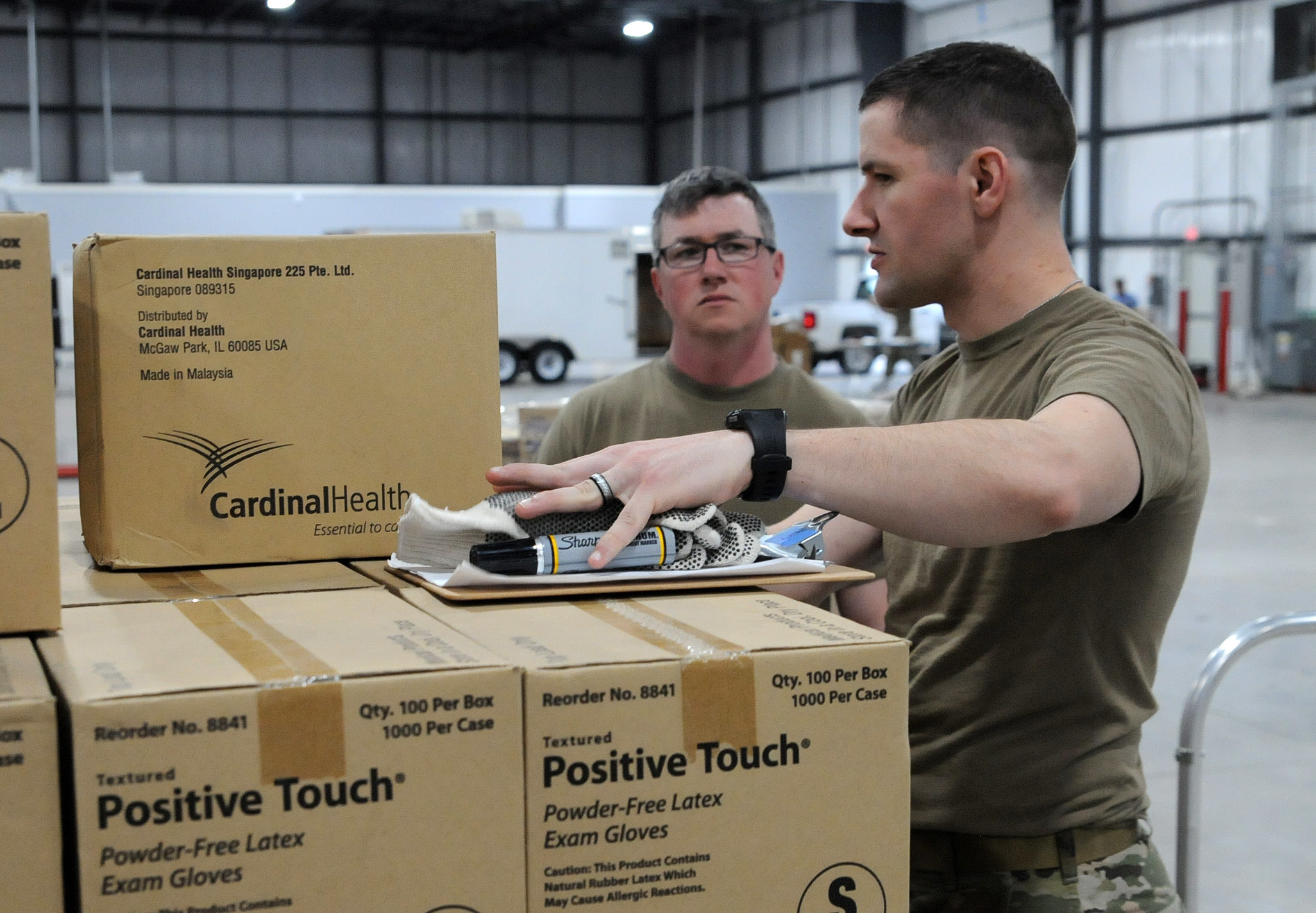
- Members of the Kentucky National Guard assist in providing medical supplies
- Disease: COVID-19
- Pathogen: SARS-CoV-2
- Location: Kentucky, U.S.
- Index case: Lexington
- Arrival date: March 6, 2020
- Confirmed cases: 227,218
- Suspected cases: 4,494
- Hospitalized cases: 1,788 (current); 4,652 (cumulative)
- Critical cases: 138 (current); 1,396 (cumulative)
- Recovered: 32,234
- Deaths: 7,517

Government website
- govstatus.egov.com/kycovid19

The COVID-19 pandemic was confirmed to have reached the U.S. Commonwealth of Kentucky on March 6, 2020, when Governor Andy Beshear's office announced the first confirmed case in Cynthiana, Kentucky, and declared a state of emergency to ensure all entities had the necessary response resources. As of January 1, 2023, 1,667,275 cumulative cases of COVID-19 were confirmed, with 17,694 deaths.

The Kentucky government announced a series of restrictions and recommendations in order to help curb the spread of the disease. Schools, universities, and a range of businesses were broadly closed to the public. Public sporting events were closed or postponed, including the 2020 Kentucky Derby.

A range of initiatives was put into place, many by executive order, including broader leeway for pharmacists, relaxing of standards for unemployment insurance, extensions of Kentucky driver licenses, the curtailing of non-essential police services in some areas, and moratoriums on evictions and utility shut-offs.

As of January 1, 2023, 2,998,106 Kentuckians had received at least one COVID-19 vaccine dose, equivalent to 67% of the population.

== Prevalence ==
Four of the first 22 confirmed cases in the Commonwealth originated among a group of friends skiing in Vail, Colorado, prior to any cases being reported there and then returning to Kentucky on March 1, 2020. Several others on the trip and their families may have been infected but were unable to be tested at the time due to extremely limited statewide testing.

The Kentucky government announced on March 6, 2020, that the state had seen its first confirmed case of the virus, in the city of Lexington. The individual had been placed in isolation in an unidentified medical facility (later identified as the University of Kentucky's Albert B. Chandler Hospital). On the same day a state of emergency was declared. One resident of Nelson County was forced into isolation when they refused to self-isolate after testing positive for the virus.

In a press conference on March 17, Governor Andy Beshear advised that the first case in Western Kentucky had been confirmed in Lyon County, and one woman had been removed from the list, after it was discovered that she had used a Kentucky address, but was actually a resident of New York. By the same day, around 380 tests had been administered in the state in total, with five counties having administrated 15 tests or more. The highest rates of both testing and confined cases were in areas around the urban centers of Louisville and Lexington.

As of March 18, one of the first two patients to test positive for the virus, a 56-year-old man from Montgomery County, had fully recovered and was released from isolation. A total of 35 cases were confirmed, and 489 test had been administered statewide. Among these were an eight-month-old from Jefferson County, reported in good condition and being treated at home.

Students arriving for in-person classes at the University of Kentucky were tested, with 254 positive results. As of September 2, there were 760 coronavirus cases among University of Kentucky students.

== Impact ==
As of March 16, Governor Beshear announced that all bars and restaurants would close to dining. The same day Beshear also announced amendments to the state's unemployment insurance requirements, waiving the seven-day waiting period and requirement for workers to actively seek employment. Plans were announced to implement state laws against price gouging via executive order.

Schools and child care facilities were closed statewide. The University of Kentucky suspended in-person classes for the entirety of the spring semester.

The electricity providers Kentucky Utilities and Louisville Gas & Electric announced it would suspend shut-offs and waive late fees until May 1, 2020.

All public facing businesses that encourage public congregation and which cannot comply with the CDC's social distancing guidelines were ordered closed as of March 17. Louisville Mayor Greg Fischer ordered the closure of playgrounds, basketball courts and soccer fields in Louisville's 120 parks on March 24.

=== Government ===
The government announced on March 16 it had applied to the U.S. Small Business Administration for assistance related to the impacts to small businesses. A three-month extension for state drivers licenses was enacted. The state's primary elections were suspended until June 23, 2020.

As of March 11, Kentucky Supreme Court Chief Justice John D. Minton Jr. suspended most state court hearings for one month. Federal court hearings had elsewhere been suspended by Danny C. Reeves, Chief U.S. District Judge. Leaders from the Kentucky General Assembly announced that the 2020 session would continue despite warnings about gathering in large groups. In-person meetings with legislators would be restricted only to essential contacts.

A spokesperson for the Louisville Metro Housing Authority advised that they would suspend evictions and set outs. The Louisville Metro Police Department announced they would no longer be responding to certain calls, including hit-and-run, public intoxication, and disorderly conduct. The Lexington Fire Department enacted a number of steps, including restricting public access to stations, but were still responding to all emergency calls. State Child Protective Services workers were ordered to limit contact with families except in cases of "imminent risk or high risk-only circumstances".

Due to the large number of people filing new claims, the state's system for registering workers for unemployment insurance crashed as of March 17 and remained down as of March 18.

As of March 18, the Kentucky Transportation Cabinet closed all Real ID stations in addition to "all circuit court clerk offices, Kentucky licensing regional field offices, cabinet one-stop shop and cabinet district highway, administrative, maintenance and equipment offices."

As of March 22, there were 103 confirmed cases. Kentucky Senator Rand Paul announced he had tested positive for the virus.

Mayor Greg Fischer of Louisville ordered the closure of playgrounds, basketball courts and soccer fields in the city's parks on March 24.

Due to a surge of cases in Alabama the Kentucky State Government advised all travelers from the state to self-quarantine for 14 days upon arrival.

=== Healthcare ===
On March 17 an executive order was announced allowing pharmacists to issue prescriptions for 30 days if they cannot contact a patient's doctor. It also allowed pharmacists to set up and conduct business in areas not covered by the normal permitting process, to increase the ease and availability of mobile operations. Blood donations were substantially impacted as scheduled blood drives were cancelled and the public took measures to avoid public spaces. Adult daycare centers were ordered closed as of March 17.

=== Religion ===
Initially, religious leaders were upset when Governor Beshear called for all religious services to be halted on March 11, 2020. However, many followed the guideline on Sunday the 14th with even more following by the following Sunday. The Roman Catholic Diocese of Covington suspended public masses from March 20 until further notice.

By April 4, two churches in Hopkins County had been linked to an outbreak with over 50 cases and 4 deaths.

On Easter 2020, Beshear had the Kentucky State Police show up to churches who defied his order banning mass gatherings, including religious services. This ban on religious services was eventually struck down by the courts.

=== Sports ===
The running of the Kentucky Derby, normally scheduled for the first Saturday in May, was postponed until September. This was the first time in 75 years that the race was rescheduled.

NASCAR held their races at Kentucky Speedway in Sparta as planned on July 9–12. The Xfinity Series gained an additional race there for the first since 2017 that there would a second race at the track for the Xfinity Series. All the events were closed behind doors.

=== Arts ===
Due to the negative economic impact the pandemic had on artists of all disciplines, Kentucky Governor's School for the Arts increased the amount of funding alumni were eligible to apply for through its Toyota Alumni Fund granting program in 2021.

In December 2022, literary press Whiskey Tit published Tell Me What You See, a short fiction collection by Christian County native Terena Elizabeth Bell, which compared Kentucky's shutdown to New York City's and included multiple photographs of Governor Andy Beshear.

=== Governor's Daily Address ===
Governor Beshear has a daily public address at 5:00 pm EDT on the COVID-19 pandemic. The Governor is joined regularly by an ASL interpreter, Kentucky Commission on the Deaf and the Hard of Hearing Executive Director Virginia Moore, and Dr. Steven Stack, Commissioner of the Kentucky Department of Public Health. The Governor has come up with several hashtags he wants Kentuckians to use: #TeamKentucky, #TogetherKy, #HealthyatHome, and #Patriot. Some of the common phrases that the Governor uses during these addresses can be purchased on various items to help raise money for Team Kentucky fund started by the Governor to help those who have been hurt financially by the pandemic. The Governor also asks people to light up their house green whenever there are coronavirus deaths in the state that day to honor those that are lost. As part of this, Beshear has ordered the Governor's Mansion and the State Capitol dome illuminated in green on those nights.

=== Public response ===
Compliance with the Governor's order to wear masks was reported as a "mixed bag" in Louisville. One store in Kentucky denied entry to customers wearing masks.

Protests against the Governor's restrictions began in March 2020 with opposition hanging an effigy of Andy Beshear on March 24.

=== Lifting of restrictions ===
On June 11, 2021, Governor Beshear issued an executive order lifting most coronavirus restrictions throughout Kentucky. This included all capacity restrictions, Healthy at Work requirements as well as the statewide mask mandate in most cases. Masks will still be required on public transportation as well as in healthcare and long-term care facilities. In addition, masks wearing remains recommended in correctional facilities and homeless shelters as well as by anyone who has a compromised immune system, is experiencing COVID-19 symptoms or has tested positive for COVID-19 in the previous ten days. Private businesses will also retain the right to require mask wearing in their facilities or on their property.

Classes began as expected on August 11 but several school districts closed due to infections.

== See also ==
- Timeline of the COVID-19 pandemic in the United States
- COVID-19 pandemic in the United States – for impact on the country
- COVID-19 pandemic – for impact on other countries
- Misinformation related to the COVID-19 pandemic
