= Glen Burnie (disambiguation) =

Glen Burnie, Maryland is a census-designated place in Anne Arundel County, Maryland, United States.

Glen Burnie may also refer to:

- Glen Burnie (New York), a tributary of the Little Delaware River near Delhi, New York
- Glen Burnie (Winchester, Virginia), a historic home built c. 1794, now part of the Museum of the Shenandoah Valley
- Glen Burnie (Palmyra, Virginia), a historic home built in 1829
- Glen Burnie (Hopkinsville, Kentucky), a historic home built in 1830.
