= Western State =

Western State may refer to:

- Western State (Nigeria), a former state in Nigeria
- Western State Conference, a sport association of California community colleges
- Western State Colorado University, former name until 2018 of Western Colorado University
- Western State College of Law
- Missouri Western State University
- Western State University, Curacao, Kingdom of Netherlands, a university holding charter by the Ministry of Education, Science, Culture and Sports, Government of Curaçao, Kingdom of the Netherlands

== See also ==
- Western States Endurance Run
- Western States Hockey League
- The Western State Hurricanes
- Western State Hospital (disambiguation)
