= Grace Episcopal Church (Hopkinsville, Kentucky) =

Historic church in Kentucky, United States

- U.S. National Register of Historic Places
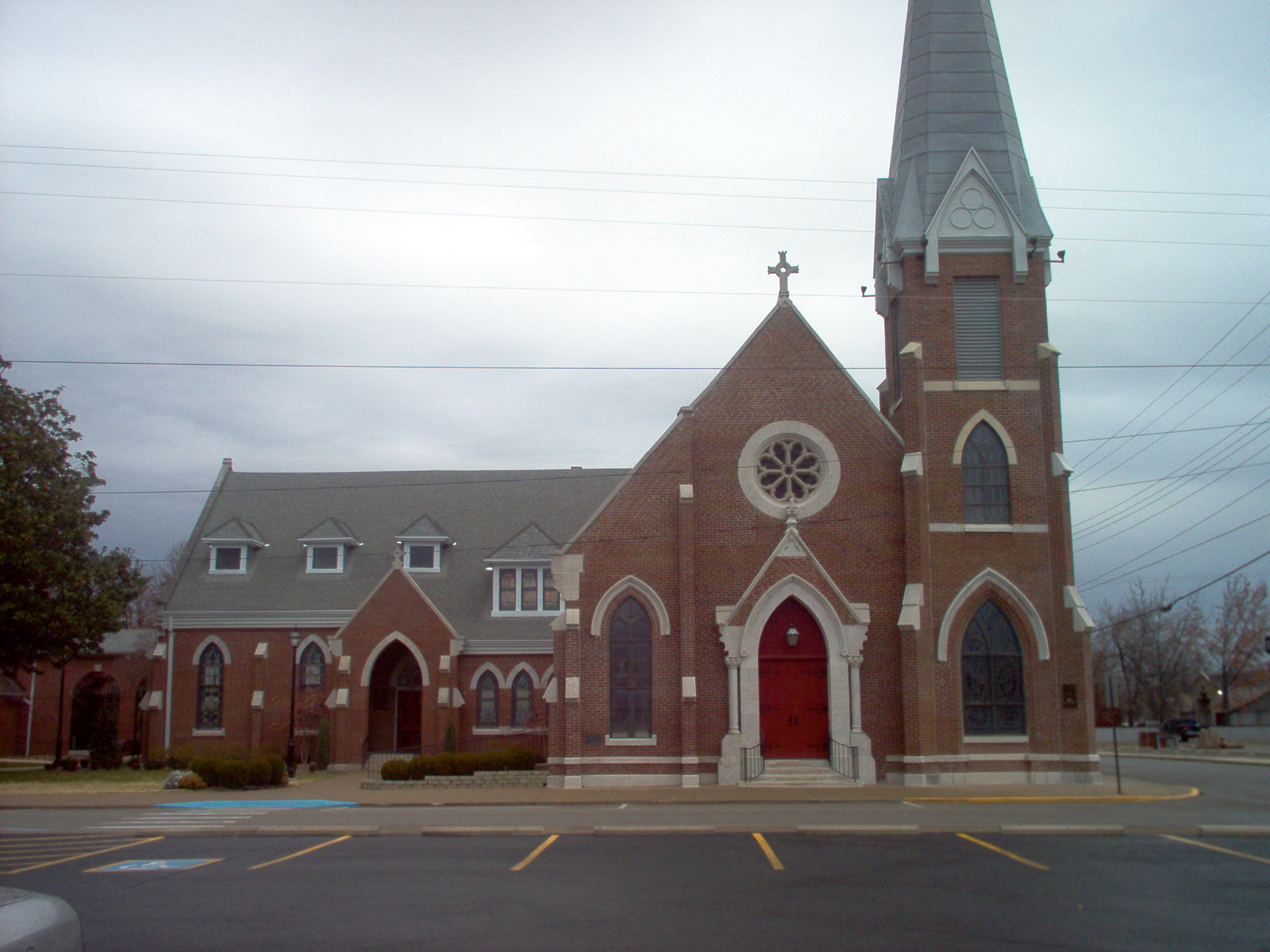
- The Church's entrance on East 6th St.

- Location within Kentucky Location within the United States
- Location: 216 East 6th St., Hopkinsville, Kentucky
- Coordinates: 36°51′59″N 87°29′10″W
- Area: 0.4 acres (0.16 ha)
- Built: 1883
- Architect: J. Rosenplanter, Robert Mills
- Architectural style: English Gothic Revival
- NRHP reference No.: 82002679
- Added to NRHP: January 28, 1982

Grace Episcopal Church is a historic Episcopal parish at 216 East 6th Street in Hopkinsville, Kentucky, United States. The current (second) building was built in 1883 and added to the National Register of Historic Places in 1982. The church is a member of the Episcopal Diocese of Kentucky.

== History ==
Hopkinsville's first Episcopal parish was started around 1830 by Bishop Benjamin B. Smith and the Reverend George P. Giddinge, who was the first Missioner in Charge. Coincidentally, both of the men who lent their names to Hopkinsville and Christian County - respectively, Samuel Hopkins and William Christian - were both Episcopalians. After meeting in a Presbyterian church and the local courthouse, the members of Grace Episcopal Church constructed their first building around 1850 near the northern end of its present location. Additionally, the very first rectory still exists at the northwestern corner of Fifth and Liberty streets.

On October 10, 1875, Christian County native and president of the Confederate States of America during the American Civil War, Jefferson Davis, worshiped at Grace Church. The parish maintains a historical marker which mentions this visit. Grace Episcopal Church's current building dates to 1883, when funds were gathered for its construction. It features English Gothic Revival architecture, which was popular at the time. John C. Latham Jr., a locally renowned philanthropist from Hopkinsville, financed the majority of the cost. To return this favor, Grace Church designed two stained glass windows in the nave to honor him and his mother, Virginia Glass Latham. Latham's generosity also extended to include the purchase of an Estey Organ for the sanctuary and a $50,000 endowment following his death in 1909.

At a time when African Americans were still being oppressed in the American South, Nat Gaither opened a Christian education program to benefit black children in the 1880s. With the help of parishioners from Grace Church, Alexander Hamilton (A.H.) McNeil (The first permanent black episcopal clergyman in Christian County) raised money and constructed a separate church, Chapel of the Good Shepherd, in 1896. It was designed in the Neo-Federal style and is now occupied by the Aaron McNeil House. In the twentieth century, two additions were made to Grace Church: Gaither Hall in 1906 and All Saints Hall in 1985.

== Grace Commons ==
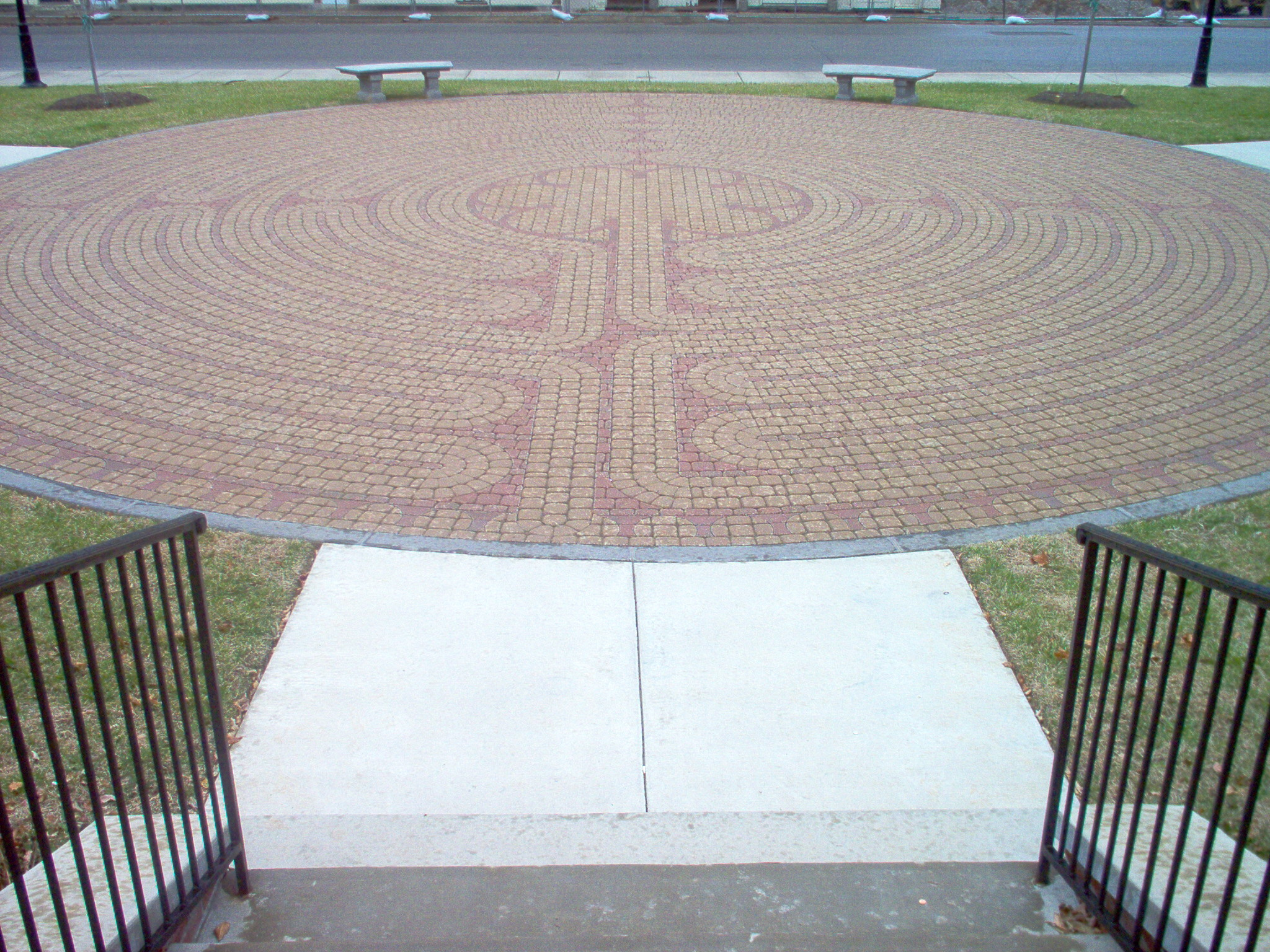
Grace Commons, a medieval-inspired labyrinth across from Grace Church's East 6th Street entrance.

Grace Commons is a labyrinth. It was designed with eleven circuits and modeled after the one integrated into the stone floor of Chartres Cathedral in Chartres, France circa 1201. The turns in the circuits are placed into four quadrants with a six-petal rosette in the center. Grace Commons is open to the public, not just members of Grace Episcopal Church. It is located at the corner of Seventh and Liberty Streets facing the main parish building. There are two entrances into the labyrinth, one with steps descending from a parking lot on Sixth Street and another that is wheelchair-accessible from Seventh Street.

Grace Episcopal Church gained the site now occupied by the Commons in November 2004. It was purchased by the parish with an endowment and an anonymous donation. The locally renowned Latham Hotel once stood on part of the property before a fire destroyed it in 1940. Yet, the building remained through Grace Church's purchase some sixty years later. Therefore, the parish leadership (i.e., the vestry) negotiated for about a year before deciding to raze the building in favor of creating a labyrinth to benefit the community. Grace Commons was constructed by Labyrinths in Stone from Yorkville, Illinois and was finished in October 2008. A secular ribbon-cutting ceremony was conducted by Hopkinsville civic leaders on May 26, 2009, and an ecclesial dedication was held by Bishop Ted Gulick on July 19, 2009.

== All Saints Hall ==
All Saints Hall is a small convention center attached to Grace Episcopal Church's main structure. The building efforts that led to its construction began in 1976 when the Reverend J. Roland Johnston served as rector. Even after his death, Grace parish sought to gain all of its surrounding properties in order to regenerate a dying neighborhood which compromised its existence. This was accomplished by 1984 and included the acquisition of an automobile body shop, a plumbing store, a billiards hall, and a Veterans of Foreign Wars Club. The demolition projects cost Grace Church over $200,000, which were financed by a substantial bequest and a budgetary allocation. It was designed by a local architect named Tom M. Paine. The construction of All Saints Hall was about $375,000, made possible by the Diocese of Kentucky Revolving Fund and Planters Bank and Trust Company. Additionally, about half of the building's total cost was raised in special pledges and congregational donations. A groundbreaking ceremony was held on March 4, 1984, and completed by the Rader Construction Company in 1985. Grace parish gathered for the first time in All Saints Hall for a dinner on November 14, 1984. Today, it is used for meals and other functions, to include a nursery and weekday preschool. The addition features hand-blown stained glass and a variety of heraldic banners adorned with apostolic symbols, which were designed by the St. Elizabeth's Guild and the Episcopal Church Women.
