= Maplewood (Pembroke, Kentucky) =

- U.S. National Register of Historic Places
- Location within Kentucky Location within the United States
- Nearest city: Pembroke, Kentucky
- Coordinates: 36°44′21″N 87°20′28″W
- Built: 1820
- Architectural style: Federal
- MPS: Christian County MRA
- NRHP reference No.: 79003625
- Added to NRHP: April 30, 1979

Maplewood in Christian County, Kentucky, located off Mason Lane near Pembroke, Kentucky was built around 1820. It was listed on the National Register of Historic Places in 1979.

It was built originally as a one-story, five-bay brick house; a two-bay extension to the south and a kitchen ell to the west were added later. It has Federal style sidelights
