= Western State Hospital =

Western State Hospital may refer to:

- Western State Hospital (Kentucky), an inpatient center for the treatment of mental illness in Hopkinsville, Kentucky
- Western State Hospital (Virginia), a hospital for the mentally ill in Staunton, Virginia
- Western State Hospital (Washington State), a psychiatric hospital in Lakewood, Washington
