= East 7th Street Historic District =

Historic district in Kentucky, United States

- U.S. National Register of Historic Places
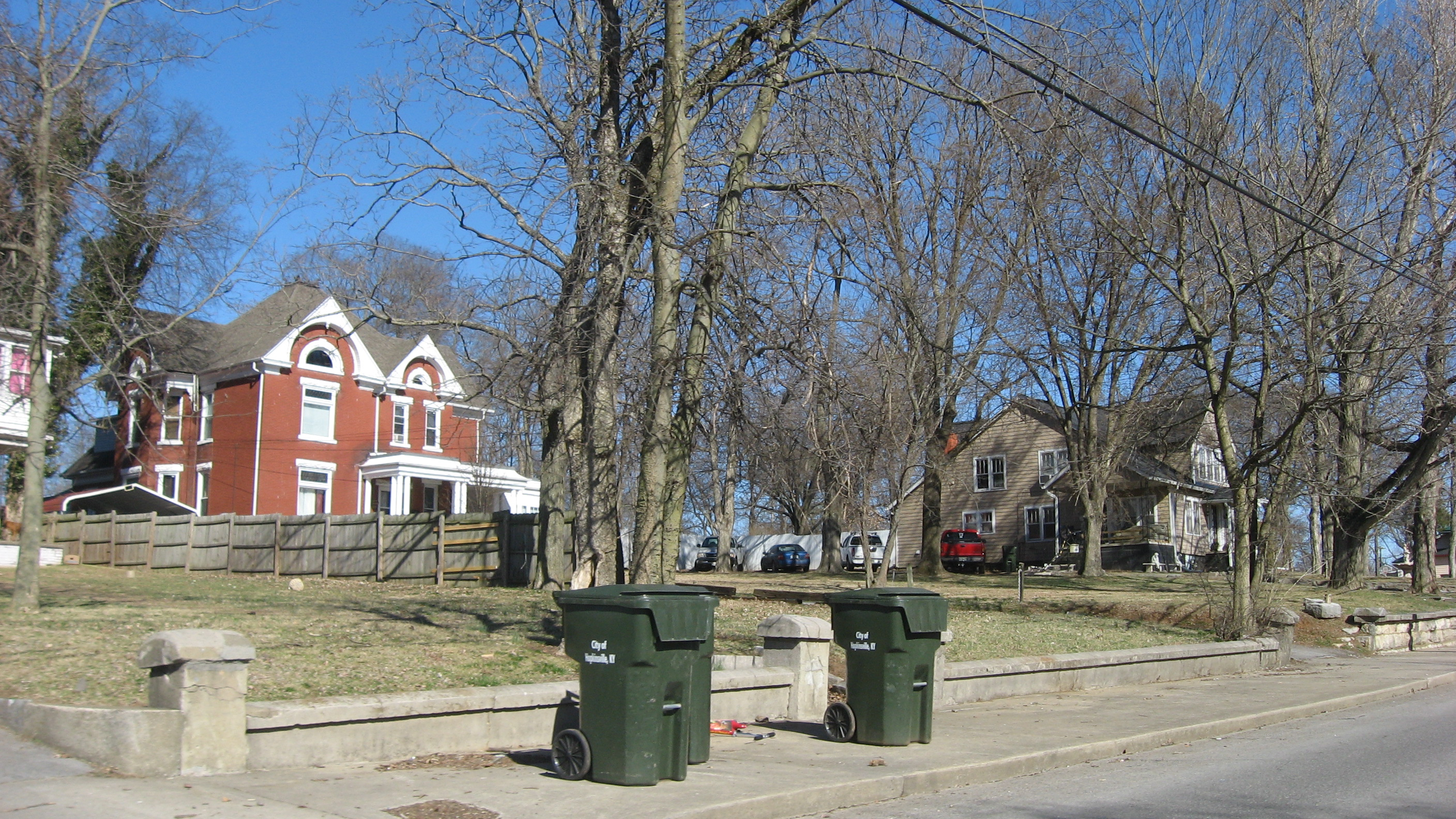

- Location within Kentucky
- Location: Roughly E. 7th St. from Campbell to Belmont Sts., Hopkinsville, Kentucky
- Coordinates: 36°51′49″N 87°28′52″W
- Area: 12 acres (4.9 ha)
- Built: 1850
- Architectural style: Greek Revival, Queen Anne, Prairie School
- MPS: Christian County MRA
- NRHP reference No.: 83000561
- Added to NRHP: September 7, 1983

The East 7th Street Historic District in Hopkinsville, Kentucky is a 12 acres (4.9 ha) historic district which was listed on the National Register of Historic Places in 1983. It included 17 contributing buildings, and is roughly E. 7th St. from Campbell to Belmont Streets.

It includes Virginia Park, which is separately listed on the National Register, and up to 1912 was the site of an unpretentious frame home (c.1845) of John C. Latham, a Hopkinsville businessman and philanthropist.

It includes Greek Revival, Queen Anne, and Prairie School architecture.
