= Gracey, Kentucky =

Census-designated place in Kentucky, United States

- Census-designated place
- Location within Kentucky
- Coordinates: 36°52′41″N 87°39′44″W
- Country: United States
- State: Kentucky
- County: Christian

Area
  - Total: 0.24 sq mi (0.62 km^{2})
  - Land: 0.24 sq mi (0.62 km^{2})
  - Water: 0 sq mi (0.00 km^{2})
- Elevation: 509 ft (155 m)

Population (2020)
  - Total: 117
  - Density: 486.8/sq mi (187.96/km^{2})
- ZIP code: 42232
- Area code: 270
- GNIS feature ID: 0493072

Gracey is an unincorporated community and census-designated place in Christian County, Kentucky, United States. As of the 2020 census, the population was 117, down from 138 in the 2010 census.

== History ==
Gracey had its start when the railroad was extended to that point. The town was laid out in 1887, and named in honor of Frank P. Gracey, a railroad official. A post office was established at Gracey in 1887.

== Geography ==
Gracey is located in western Christian County at 36°52′41″N 87°39′44″W at an elevation of 509 feet (155 m). U.S. Route 68/Kentucky Route 80 bypasses the community to the north, while its old alignment, now known as Tobacco Road, runs along the southern edge. Hopkinsville, the Christian County seat, is 10 miles (16 km) to the east, and Interstate 24 is 4 miles (6 km) to the west.

According to the U.S. Census Bureau, the Gracey CDP has a total area of 0.24 square miles (0.62 km^{2}), all land.

== Demographics ==
Historical population
Census	Pop.	Note	%±
2010	138		—
2020	117		−15.2%
U.S. Decennial Census

Gracey was first listed as a census designated place in the 2010 U.S. census.

=== Racial and ethnic composition ===
Gracey CDP, Kentucky – Racial and ethnic composition Note: the US Census treats Hispanic/Latino as an ethnic category. This table excludes Latinos from the racial categories and assigns them to a separate category. Hispanics/Latinos may be of any race.
Race / Ethnicity (NH = Non-Hispanic)	Pop 2010	Pop 2020	% 2010	% 2020
White alone (NH)	107	87	77.54%	74.36%
Black or African American alone (NH)	19	19	13.77%	16.24%
Native American or Alaska Native alone (NH)	0	0	0.00%	0.00%
Asian alone (NH)	4	1	2.90%	0.85%
Native Hawaiian or Pacific Islander alone (NH)	0	0	0.00%	0.00%
Other race alone (NH)	0	0	0.00%	0.00%
Mixed race or Multiracial (NH)	6	7	4.35%	5.98%
Hispanic or Latino (any race)	2	3	1.45%	2.56%
Total	138	117	100.00%	100.00%
