= Hopkinsville station =

- Hopkinsville L & N Railroad Depot
- U.S. National Register of Historic Places
- U.S. Historic district – Contributing property
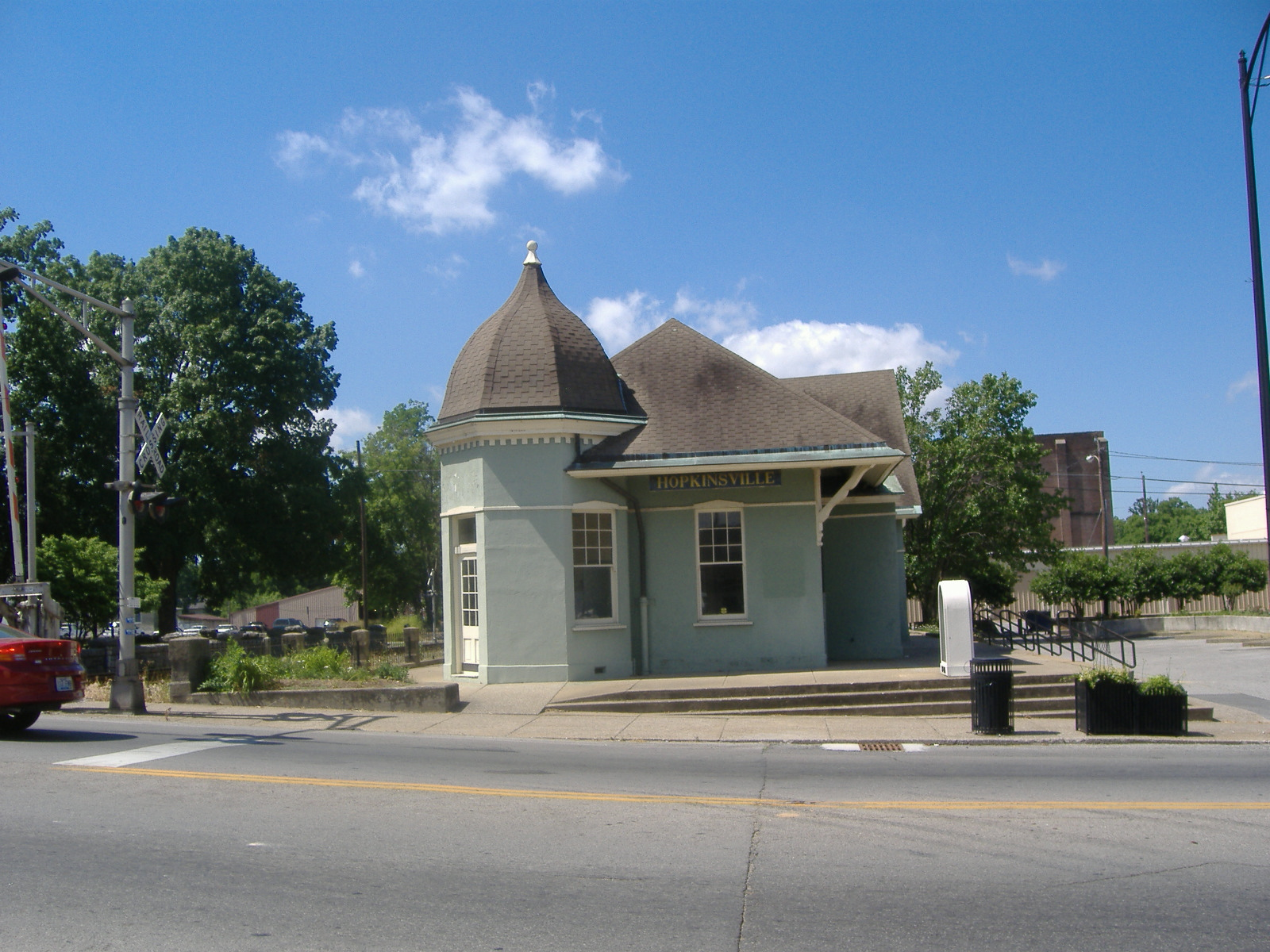

- Location within Kentucky Location within the United States
- Location: Hopkinsville, Kentucky
- Coordinates: 36°51′49″N 87°29′7″W
- Built: 1892
- Part of: Hopkinsville Commercial Historic District (ID79003633)
- NRHP reference No.: 75000745

Significant dates
- Added to NRHP: August 1, 1975
- Designated CP: April 30, 1979

The L & N Railroad Depot in the Hopkinsville Commercial Historic District of Hopkinsville, Kentucky is a historic railroad station on the National Register of Historic Places. It was built by the Louisville & Nashville Railroad in 1892.

The year 1832 saw the first of many attempts to woo a railroad to Hopkinsville. This first attempt was to connect Hopkinsville to Eddyville, Kentucky. In 1868 Hopkinsville finally obtained a railroad station, operated by the Evansville, Henderson, & Nashville Railroad. The Louisville & Nashville Railroad acquired the railroad in 1879.

The Hopkinsville depot is a single-story frame building with a slate roof. It has six rooms: a Ladies Waiting room (the room closest to the street), a General Waiting Room, a Colored Waiting Room, a baggage room (the furthest room from the street), a ticket office (the only room which connected to all three waiting rooms), and a ladies' restroom. Immediately outsides were warehouses for freight, usually tobacco.

Its last long-distance train was the Louisville and Nashville's Georgian, last operating in 1968.

During its operating years, the Hopkinsville depot was a popular layover spot for those traveling by train. It was the only Louisville & Nashville station between Evansville, Indiana and Nashville, Tennessee where it was legal to drink alcohol. Hopkinsville got the nickname "Hop town" due to train passengers asking the conductors when they would arrive at Hopkinsville, so they could "hop off and get a drink".

The Hopkinsville L & N Railroad Depot was placed on the National Register of Historic Places on August 1, 1975. It is owned by the City of Hopkinsville and was occupied by the Pennyroyal Arts Council until 2019. That year the council moved out after a fire in an exterior wall and the building was still vacant as of January 2023. The depot's future was uncertain as it requires an estimated $2M USD in structural repairs and those costs are in competition with other city funding priorities.

CSX, which bought out the Louisville & Nashville, still run freight trains on the tracks next to the depot.

Preceding station	Louisville and Nashville Railroad	Following station
Kelly toward St. Louis	St. Louis – Nashville	Casky toward Nashville
