= University Heights Academy =

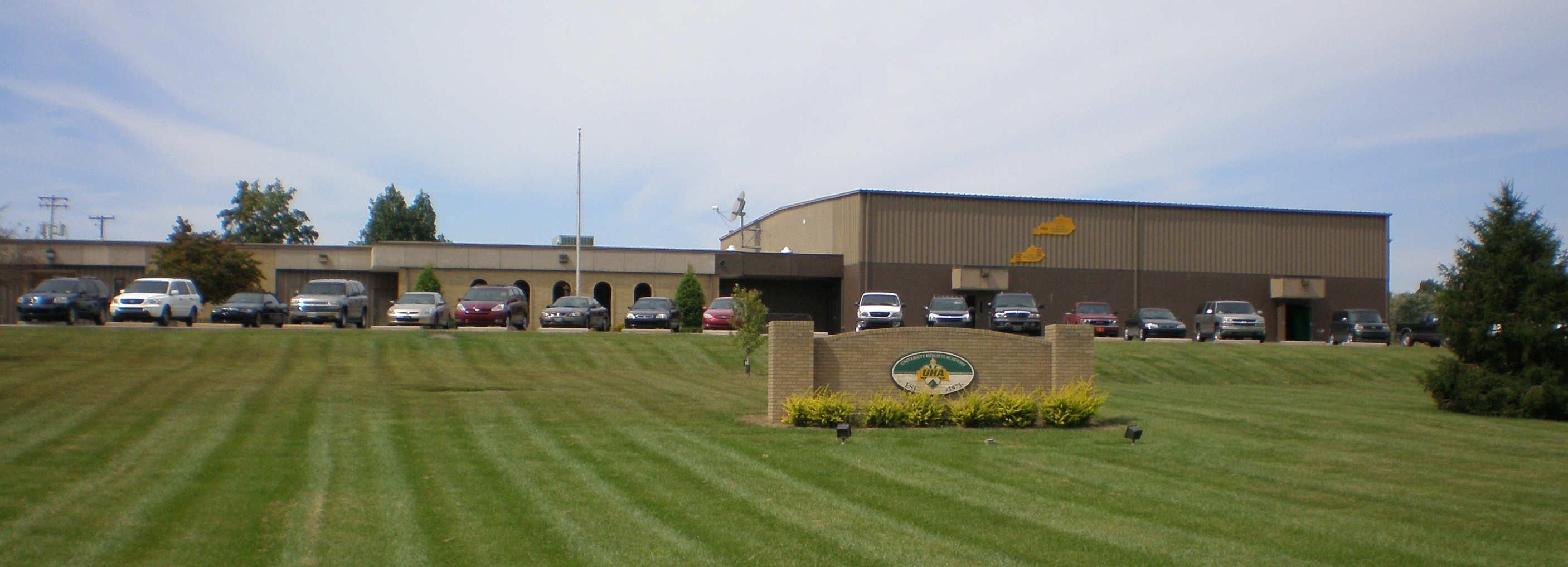

Location
- 1300 Academy Drive; Hopkinsville, KY 42240; 36.890°N 87.499°W

Information
- Type: Private
- Established: 1973
- School board: Mr. Tim Flynn (Chair) Mr. Foster Cotthoff (Vice-Chair) Mrs. Michelle Givens (Secretary) Mrs. Megan Conrad (Treasurer) Mr. Scott Barlow Ms. Sarah Flynn Mr. Hiren Shah Mrs. Mona Sheth Mrs. Lisa Sisk Mr. Justin Williams
- Head of school: Tonya Oakley
- Faculty: 37
- Colors: Green and Gold
- Athletics conference: KHSAA
- Sports: Basketball, soccer, cross-country, golf, cheerleading, volleyball, track, softball, tennis, winter guard
- Mascot: Blazers
- Nickname: UHA
- Accreditation: Kentucky Department of Education, Independent Schools Association of the Central States
- Website: www.uha-ky.org

University Heights Academy (University Heights or UHA) is an independent, college preparatory school for students in pre-kindergarten through 12th grade located in Hopkinsville, Kentucky. The school was founded in 1973. As of April 2023, K-12 enrollment is 417. The school also includes a day care center, an all-weather track, a softball field, a baseball field, a soccer field, walking trails, a pond and stream, an astronomy pad, and an activity building/gymnasium. When the school first opened, its mascot was initially the Blue Devil; in 1976, the student body voted to change this to the Blazer. UHA has long had a strong athletics tradition: In 1992, the boys' basketball took home the KHSAA state trophy. It also offered one of the first school soccer teams in western Kentucky and the first in Christian County.

== Intent & Purpose ==
According to Hoptown Chronicle, at its opening, the school introduced itself to the Hopkinsville community by publishing the note below:

An Open Letter to the Community:

We are proud to be able to offer the children of our community a new dimension in education. University Heights Academy takes for its motto the traditions of classical education.

The Academy is an expression of the desires of the citizens of our community educate their children so that religion, moral discipline and academic achievement shall continue to be their birthright.

In the years to come our children will discover not only the beauty of learning but will learn about themselves as unique individuals. The Academy’s future is as bright as their hopes.

== Alumni ==
More than 1,000 students graduated from UHA during its first 50 years. Successful alumni include The Black Crowes drummer Steve Gorman, NBA basketball player Greg Buckner, Hoptown Chronicle founder Jennifer Brown, and Tell Me What You See author Terena Elizabeth Bell.

== See also ==
- Hopkinsville
- Christian County
- Private school
- Christian County High School
- Hopkinsville High School
- Heritage Christian Academy
