= Freeman Chapel C.M.E. Church =

Historic church in Kentucky, United States

- U.S. National Register of Historic Places
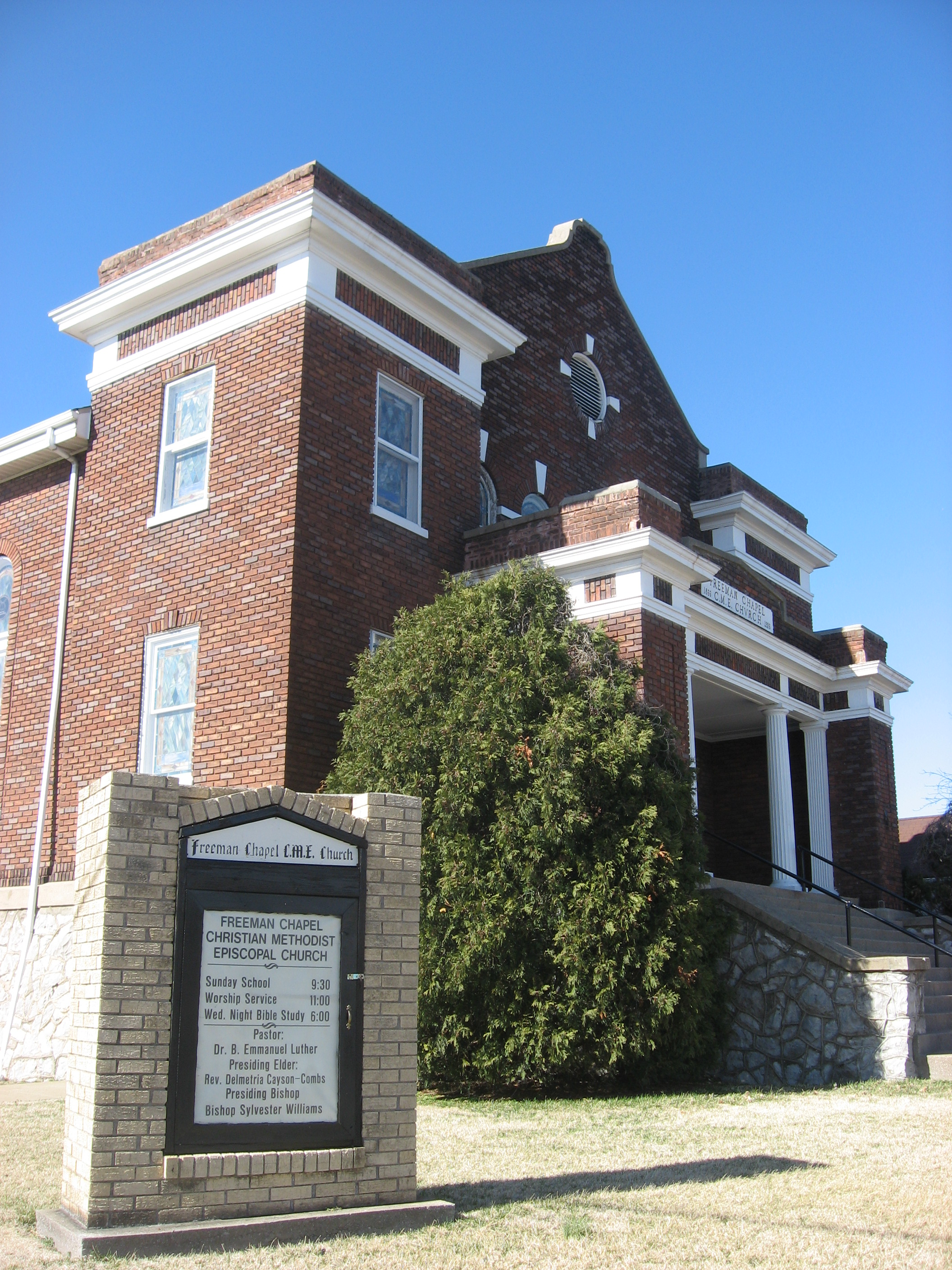
- Front with sign

- Location within Kentucky Location within the United States
- Location: 137 S. Virginia St., Hopkinsville, Kentucky
- Coordinates: 36°52′08″N 87°29′08″W
- Area: 0.5 acres (0.20 ha)
- Built: 1923-25
- Architectural style: Classical Revival
- MPS: Christian County MRA
- NRHP reference No.: 83000563
- Added to NRHP: May 26, 1983

Freeman Chapel C.M.E. Church is a historic Christian Methodist Episcopal church at 137 S. Virginia Street in Hopkinsville, Kentucky which was built during 1923–25. It was added to the National Register of Historic Places in 1983.

It was deemed significant both for its history and its architecture. It is a two-story brick Classical Revival-style building on a tall basement foundation. It has arched clerestory windows.

== See also ==
- National Register of Historic Places listings in Kentucky
