= Newstead, Kentucky =

Unincorporated community in Kentucky, United States

Coordinates: 36°47′57″N 87°37′49″W

Newstead is an unincorporated community in Christian County, in the U.S. state of Kentucky.

== History ==
Newstead had its start when the railroad was extended to that point. A post office called Newstead was established in 1847, and remained in operation until 1906.
