= Hopkinsville Commercial Historic District =

Historic district in Kentucky, United States

- U.S. National Register of Historic Places
- U.S. Historic district
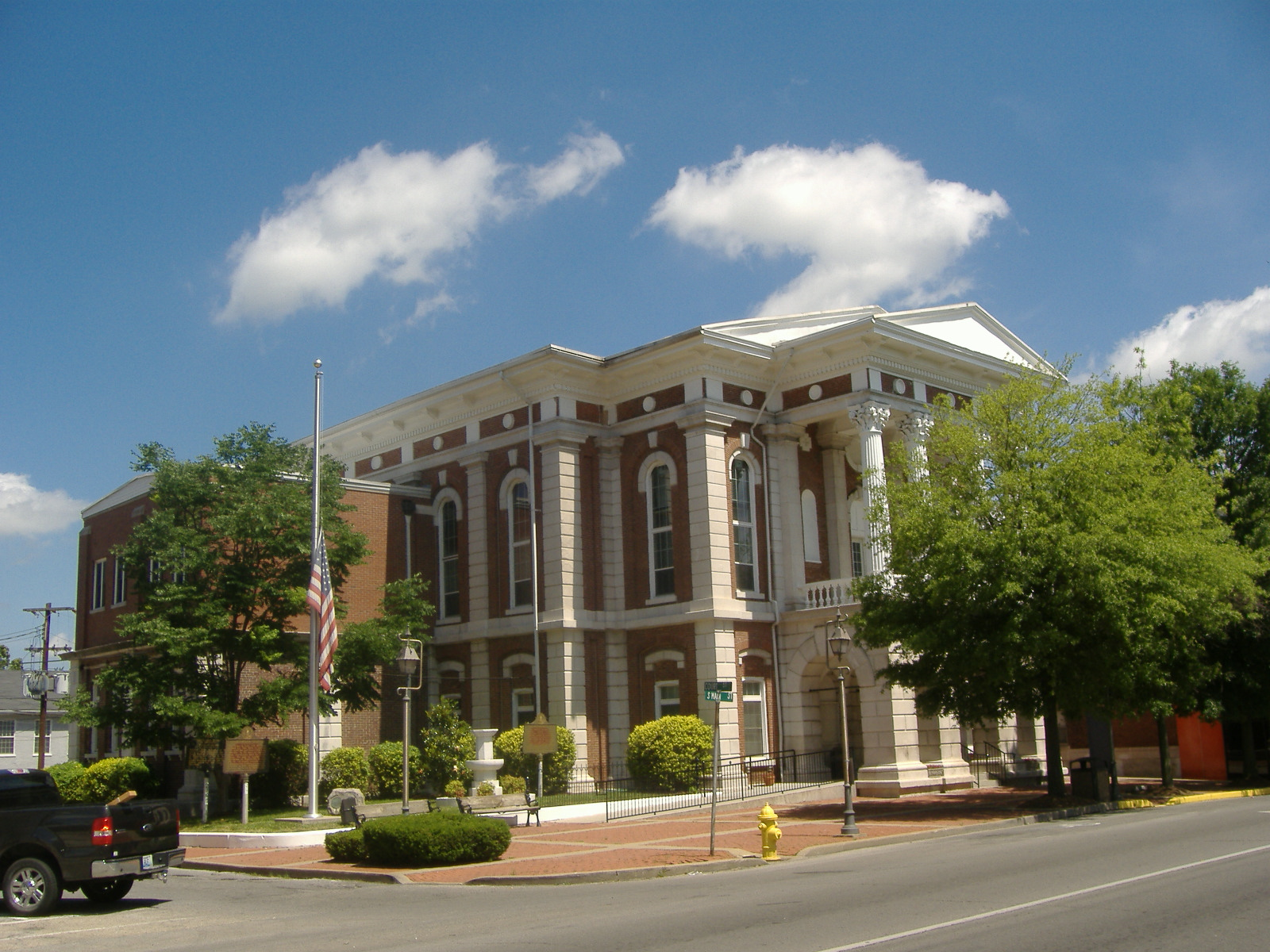
- Christian County Courthouse

- Location within Kentucky Location within the United States
- Location: Hopkinsville, Kentucky
- Coordinates: 36°51′49″N 87°29′10″W
- Built: 1914
- Architectural style: Mixed (more Than 2 Styles From Different Periods)
- MPS: Christian County MRA
- NRHP reference No.: 79003633
- Added to NRHP: April 30, 1979

The Hopkinsville Commercial Historic District of Hopkinsville, Kentucky, is a historic district listed on the National Register of Historic Places.

The site was first inhabited by the Wood family of Jonesborough, Tennessee. They donated five of their 1,200 acres (4.9 km^{2}) for the creation of a county seat, and in 1799 the site was platted and dubbed Christian Court House. Later in 1799 it was dubbed Elizabeth in honor of the Woods' eldest daughter, but due to the existence of Elizabethtown in Hardin County, in April 1804 the town was named in honor of General Samuel Hopkins.

Places in the district that are separately on the National Register include the Confederate Memorial Fountain in Hopkinsville and the Hopkinsville L & N Railroad Depot. The fountain is now located by the Christian County Courthouse. The Depot brought many passengers to spend time in Hopkinsville, as it was the one place along the railroad between Evansville, Indiana and Nashville, Tennessee where one could consume alcoholic drinks.

Other prominent buildings located in the district are the Pennyroyal Area Museum, the First Presbyterian Church, and the Old Fire House and Clock Tower. The Pennyroyal Area Museum, open since July 8, 1976, is in the historic old Hopkinsville post office, and is funded by the local government. The First Presbyterian Church was used as a hospital for General Nathan Bedford Forrest's men during the winter of 1861–1862; they were hospitalized due to a flu epidemic. The Old Fire House is currently the headquarters of the Christian County Historical Society.

== Gallery ==
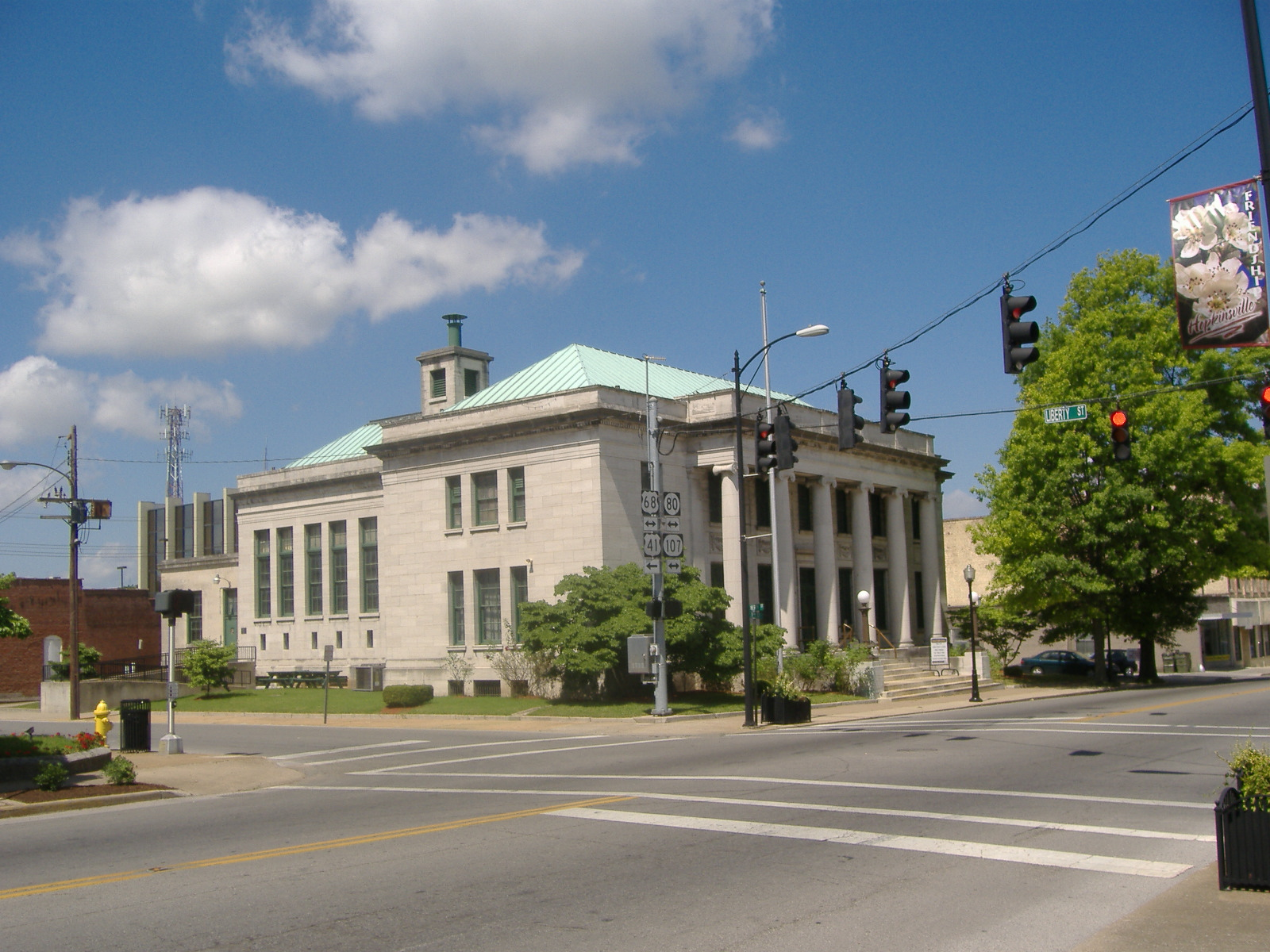
Pennyroyal Area Museum

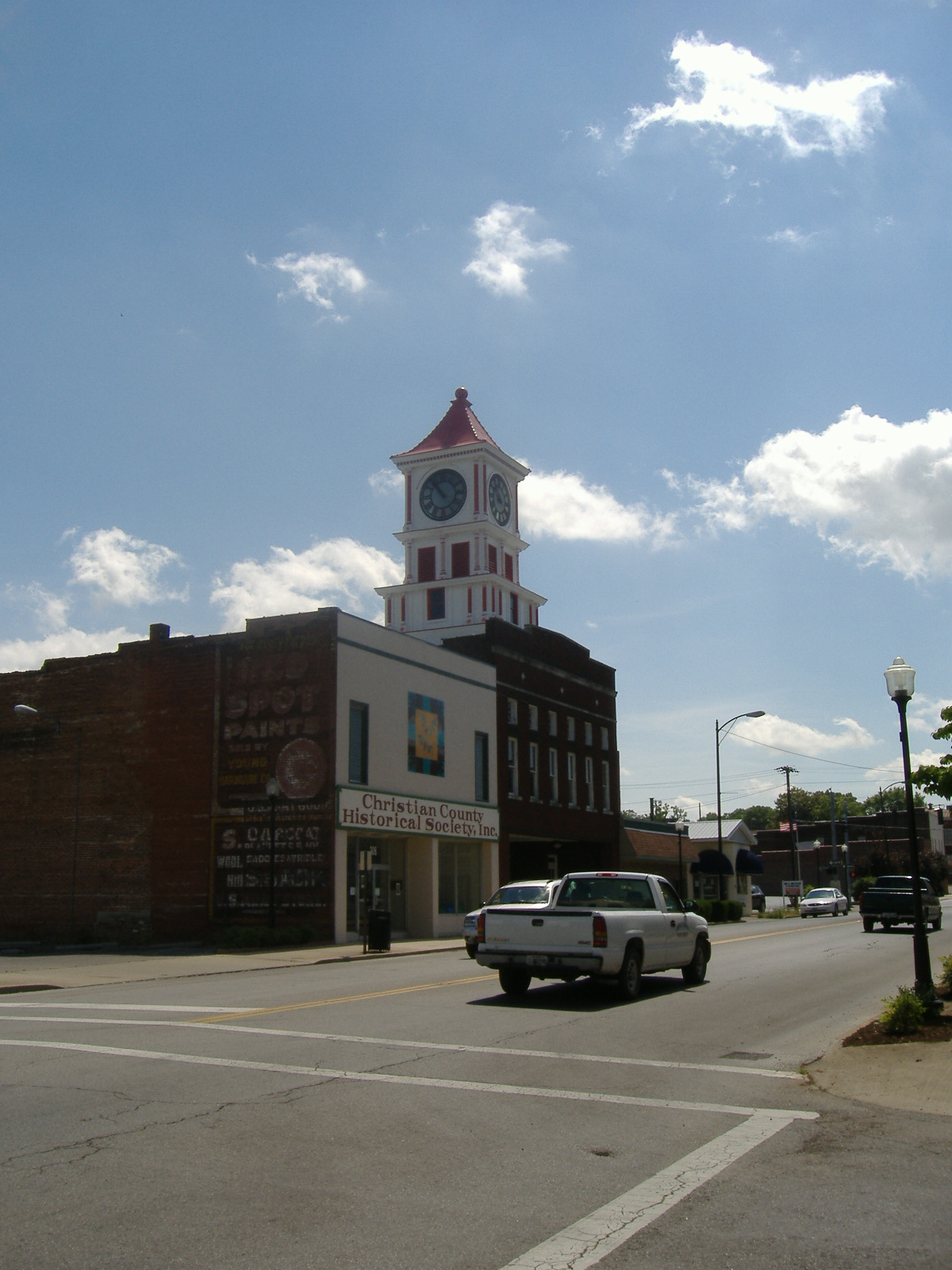
Old Firehouse/Christian County Historical Society

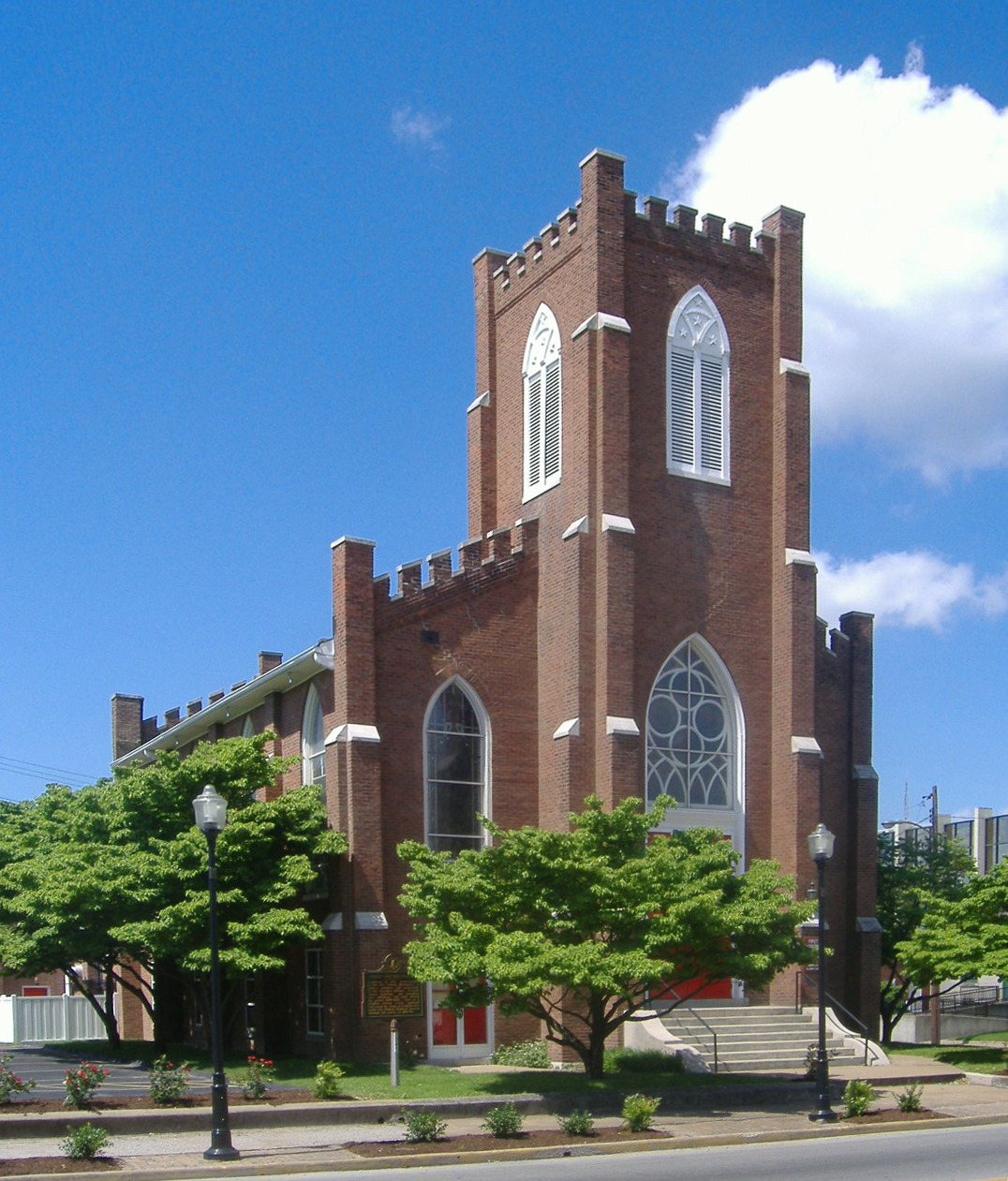
First Presbyterian Church
