= Boatright House =

- U.S. National Register of Historic Places
- Location within Kentucky Location within the United States
- Location: Off US 41, Hopkinsville, Kentucky
- Coordinates: 36°50′49″N 87°26′55″W
- Built: 1808
- MPS: Christian County MRA
- NRHP reference No.: 79003611
- Added to NRHP: April 30, 1979

The Boatright House in Hopkinsville, Kentucky, located off U.S. Route 41, was built in 1808. It was listed on the National Register of Historic Places in 1979.

It is significant as one of just two stone houses in Christian County. It is a one-story, two-room building (as is the other).
