= Botwright =

Botwright is a surname. Notable people with the surname include:

- Rebecca Botwright (born 1982), English squash player
- Vicky Botwright (born 1977), English squash coach and player

== See also ==
- Boatwright, surname
