= Glen Burnie (Hopkinsville, Kentucky) =

- U.S. National Register of Historic Places
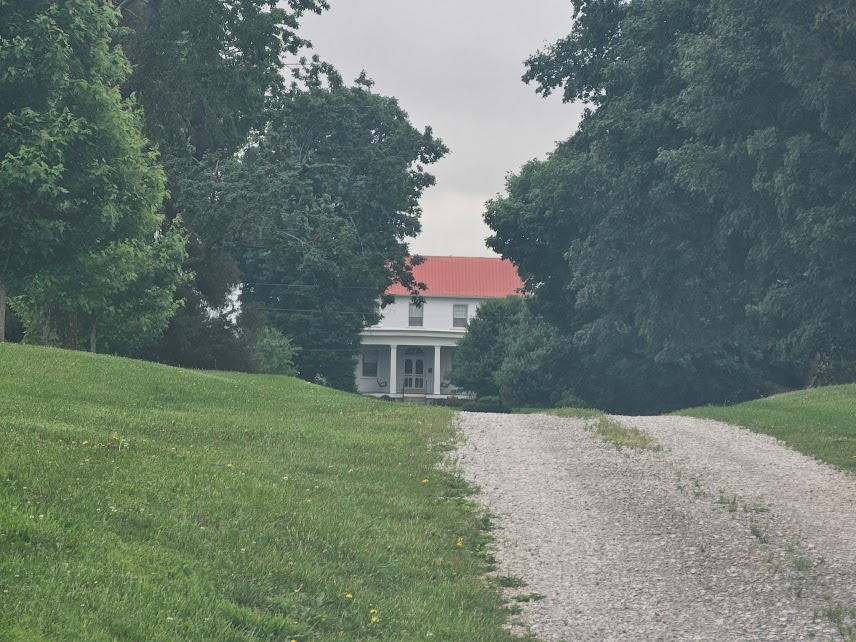

- Location within Kentucky
- Nearest city: Hopkinsville, Kentucky
- Coordinates: 36°41′00″N 87°23′30″W
- Built: c.1830
- Architectural style: Greek Revival, Federal
- MPS: Christian County MRA
- NRHP reference No.: 79003618
- Added to NRHP: April 30, 1979

Glen Burnie is a brick house situated near Hopkinsville, Kentucky. It dates from around 1830. It was listed on the National Register of Historic Places in 1979.

It is a two-story, five-bay Federal-style house, with brick laid in Flemish bond. It has a central passage plan, a molded brick cornice and a Greek Revival-style porch which is believed to be original. It was originally L-shaped and a one-story extension was added later.
