= Edgoten, Kentucky =

Unincorporated community in Kentucky, United States

Coordinates: 36°38′30″N 87°25′26″W

Edgoten is an unincorporated community in Christian County, in the U.S. state of Kentucky.

== History ==
Edgoten had its start when the railroad was extended to that point. The community's name is an amalgamation of "edge of Tennessee". A post office called Edgoten was established in 1906, and remained in operation until 1922.
