= John Boatright =

American painter (1923–2006)

American Artist John Boatright
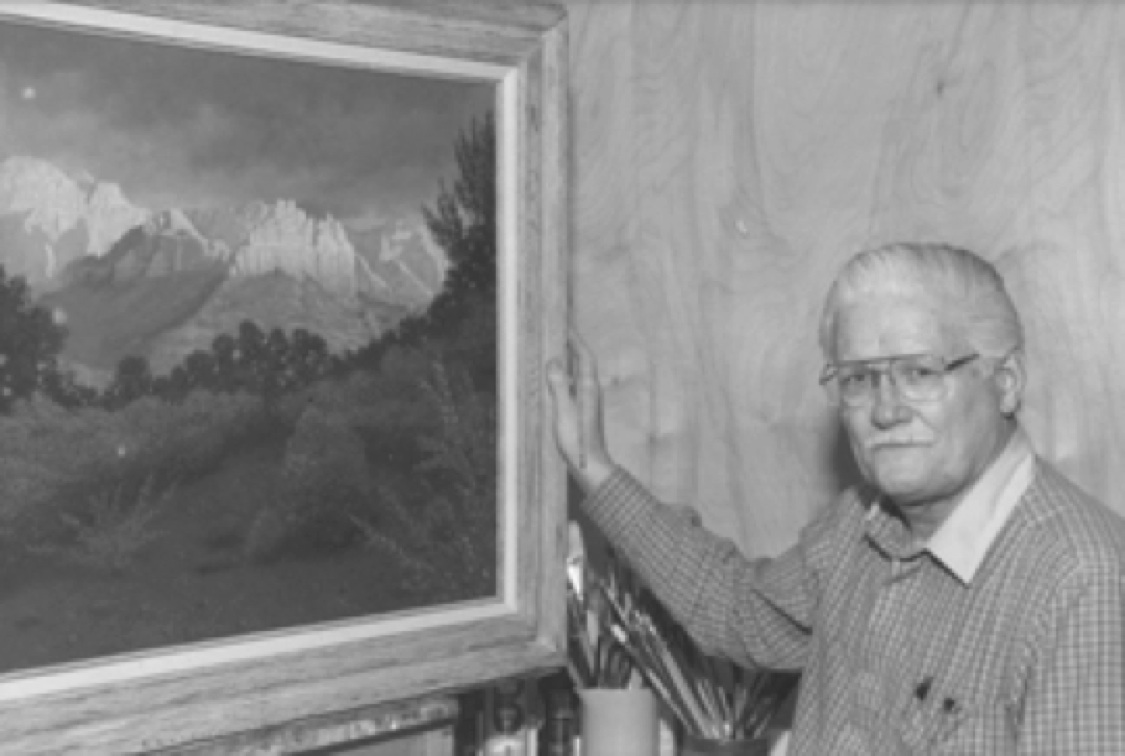
- Born: John Luther Boatright; September 29, 1923; Columbia, Tennessee, United States
- Died: February 18, 2006 (aged 82); Memphis, Tennessee
- Education: Ringling School of Art, Sarasota, Florida
- Known for: Painting
- Awards: Best of Tennessee Competition, Purchase Award, Tennessee State Museum, 2001 "Best in the USA," Realistic Fine Art Competition, Merit Award, Springfield, Mass., 1987 "The Early Eighties" Tennessee State Museum, Purchase Award, 1982

John Luther Boatright (1923–2006) was an American painter, primarily known for his use of light-filled atmospheres and shadow in landscapes with expansive cloud formations. His primary medium was oil on canvas, or linen.

Golden Pastureland by John L. Boatright

== Early life and education ==
John Luther Boatright was born on September 29, 1923, in Maury County Tennessee (near Columbia) to Hubert and Pearl Boatright. He was the oldest of three boys. In 1942, at the age of 18 he enlisted in the U.S. Army. During WWII he served as a staff sergeant in the U.S. Army Corps of Engineers assigned to a unit in support of the Third US Army in France, Belgium and finally Germany. Upon returning to the United States he had the opportunity to attend college under the GI bill at either the Art Institute of Chicago or the Ringling School of Art. After spending the winter in a tent in Belgium, he chose Florida. At the Ringling School of Art he met Roberta Ann Lethermon, and they were married in 1949.

== Career ==
John worked as a graphic artist and illustrator in Memphis Tennessee from 1949 to 1989. In 1975, he and his boys built a studio in the backyard of their home in Memphis, and he gradually shifted over to a highly successful career as a landscape painter, while doing the occasional portrait. He continued to create and sell his paintings at various galleries around the U.S. until about a year before his death on February 18, 2006, at the age of 82.

== Public Collections ==
- Tennessee State Museum, Nashville

== Selected Corporate Collections ==
- Boyle Investment Co., Memphis, TN
- Cherokee Country Club, Knoxville TN
- First American Bank, Knoxville, TN
- Kraft Incorporated, Corporate Collection, Memphis, TN
- Opryland Hotel and Convention Center, Nashville, TN
