= Howel, Kentucky =

- Unincorporated community
- Location within the state of Kentucky Howel (the United States)
- Coordinates: 36°41′57″N 87°32′8″W
- Country: United States
- State: Kentucky
- County: Christian
- Elevation: 591 ft (180 m)
- Time zone: UTC-6 (Central (CST))
  - Summer (DST): UTC-5 (CDT)
- GNIS feature ID: 494689

Howel is an unincorporated community in Christian County, Kentucky, United States.

== History ==
Howel had its start when the railroad was extended to that point. A post office was established at Howel in 1886, and remained in operation until 1957.
