= Honey Grove, Kentucky =

- Unincorporated community
- Location within the state of Kentucky Honey Grove (the United States)
- Coordinates: 36°53′23″N 87°18′35″W
- Country: United States
- State: Kentucky
- County: Christian
- Elevation: 715 ft (218 m)
- Time zone: UTC-6 (Central (CST))
  - Summer (DST): UTC-5 (CDT)
- GNIS feature ID: 494479

Honey Grove, sometimes spelled as Honeygrove, is an unincorporated community in Christian County, Kentucky, United States. Kentucky Route 508 runs through the community. Honey Grove has a single firehouse that is staffed by volunteer personnel.

The McClellen House is located in Honey Grove, and was listed on the U.S. National Register of Historic Places in 1979.
