= Todd Boatwright =

American journalist

- Born: September 5, 1965 (age 60); Dallas, Texas
- Occupations: television news anchor, journalist

Todd Boatwright (born September 5, 1965, in Dallas, Texas) is Spectrum News 1 Texas's weekend morning news anchor.

== Career ==
Boatwright graduated from the University of North Texas with a degree in radio, Television, and Film, and during his studies he was an intern at KDFW in Dallas. His first appearance on TV as an anchor and reporter was at KAVU in Victoria, Texas. After 15 months he moved to KETK-TV in Tyler, where he spent five years as the Longview bureau chief and reporter. In 2000, Boatwright reported on the Republican and Democratic Conventions. As weekend morning anchor at Spectrum News 1 Texas, Boatwright covers breaking and news of the day, including a weekly feature segment called Todd's Texas.
