= Hensleytown, Kentucky =

- Unincorporated community
- Location within the state of Kentucky Hensleytown (the United States)
- Coordinates: 36°39′31″N 87°24′46″W
- Country: United States
- State: Kentucky
- County: Christian
- Elevation: 577 ft (176 m)
- Time zone: UTC-6 (Central (CST))
  - Summer (DST): UTC-5 (CDT)
- GNIS feature ID: 494076

Hensleytown is an unincorporated community in Christian County, Kentucky, United States.
