= Julien, Kentucky =

- Unincorporated community
- Location within the state of Kentucky Julien (the United States)
- Coordinates: 36°50′12″N 87°38′23″W
- Country: United States
- State: Kentucky
- County: Christian
- Elevation: 489 ft (149 m)
- Time zone: UTC-6 (Central (CST))
  - Summer (DST): UTC-5 (CDT)
- GNIS feature ID: 508364

Julien is an unincorporated community in Christian, Kentucky, United States.

== History ==
Julien had its start when the railroad was extended to that point. A post office called Julian was established in 1888, and remained in operation until 1909.
