= Tell Me What You See (book) =

Fiction collection by Terena Elizabeth Bell

- Author: Terena Elizabeth Bell
- Language: English
- Genre: Experimental literature
- Published: Dec 8, 2022
- Publisher: Whiskey Tit
- Publication place: United States
- Pages: 143
- ISBN: 9781952600227

Tell Me What You See is a short fiction collection written by Terena Elizabeth Bell. The book is Bell's first and was published on December 8, 2022, by Whisk(e)y Tit, a Brooklyn-based literary press. It contains ten short stories of multiple genres. The title story, "Tell Me What You See," is a 2021 New York Foundation for the Arts City Artist Corps winner and the first fiction published about the January 6th attack on the US Capitol. Other stories are about climate change, early COVID-19 pandemics in New York City and Kentucky, and other 2020–2021 events.

The stories from Tell Me What You See are largely experimental in nature. Many incorporate news photographs and original drawings from both the pandemic and Capitol events. Others make use of footnotes, multiple languages, hypnotic syntax, and the literary technique of erasure.

== Critical reception ==
Rachel Lutwick-Deaner of the Southern Review of Books at the Queen's University of Charlotte wrote, "Readers will easily compare Bell with many greats of our time" and "Bell’s collection is not only a testament to what a fine author can do with a difficult time in history, but it is a work that transcends time and circumstance." Jordan McQueen of Atticus Review wrote, "The places where the gimmicks transcend to become genuinely innovative tools...make the collection well worth the cost of admission in my view."

On his KPFK show "Bibliocracy," Santa Monica Review editor Andrew Tonkovich said the book's "exciting embrace of nearly every available form both challenges the expectation of story and fully engages its opportunities, demands and, lately, urgent requirements."

Critic Samantha Ryan of Pine Hills Review agreed with Tonkovich's view, writing, "These stories are demanding. They confront the reader with the weight of past loss and the fear of an unknown future," adding that "despite their challenging nature, the pieces were deeply therapeutic."

Karla Strand of Ms. listed it in her "December 2022 Reads for the Rest of Us", and described the stories as "unique and potent," adding "its varying formats eerily illustrate the look and feel of our times." In the United Kingdom, publishing industry magazine The Bookseller included the title in its December 2022 "Discover" preview selections.

In September 2024, the New York Society Library listed Tell Me What You See as one of the "Best Books of the 21st Century (So Far)," alongside titles by Neil Gaiman, Alice Hoffman, Colm Tóibín, and others.
