= Western State Hospital (Kentucky) =

- Western Lunatic Asylum
- U.S. National Register of Historic Places
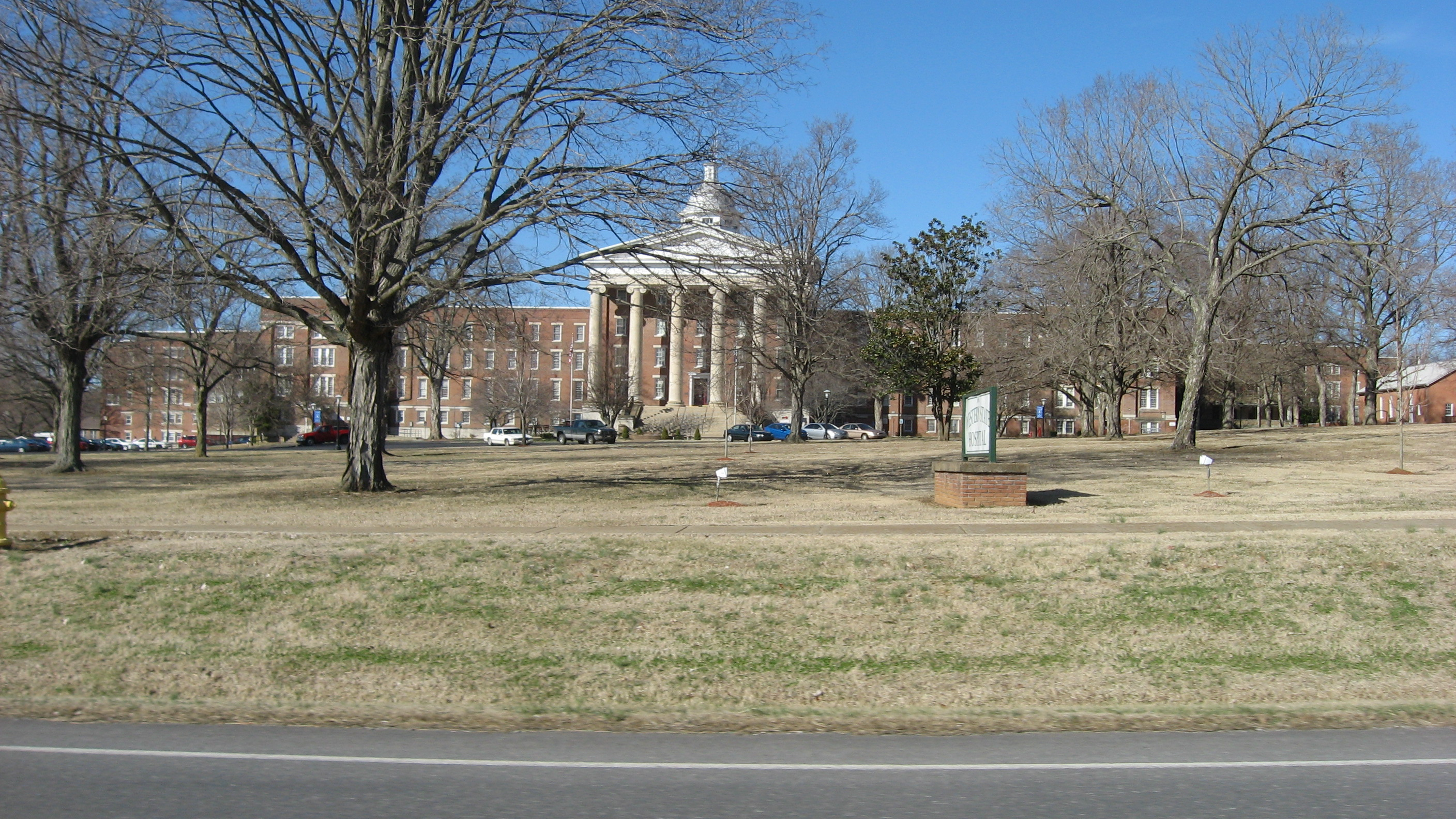
- Roadside view

- Location within Kentucky Location within the United States
- Nearest city: Hopkinsville, Kentucky
- Coordinates: 36°51′54″N 87°27′4″W
- Built: 1854
- Architect: Kelly, N.B.; Salter & Orr
- MPS: Christian County MRA
- NRHP reference No.: 79003612
- Added to NRHP: April 30, 1979

The Western State Hospital is a publicly funded psychiatric hospital in Hopkinsville, Kentucky.

== History ==
Construction began in 1848, in Hopkinsville, Kentucky, on The Western Kentucky Lunatic Asylum, which began admitting patients in 1854. Later renamed Western State Hospital, the facility currently operates as an inpatient center for the treatment of mental illness. It is on the National Register of Historic Places. It had a patient population as high as 2,200 by 1950. Improved medications for treatment of mental disorders allowed de-institutionalization and a decrease in inpatient numbers. The inpatient population as of 2004 was 220, from 34 counties in Western Kentucky. Its three facilities employed 650 workers in 2004.

Unconfirmed stories of alleged paranormal activity at the facility were featured in the book Hauntings of the Western Lunatic Asylum by author Steve E. Asher.

=== Preservation ===
The hospital underwent renovation in 2019. The old cage elevator had reportedly not been in use for around four years, which was then replaced with a newer and larger elevator that cost $300,000. This new installation was also part of a bigger renovation project involving upgrades to both the interior and exterior at the hospital, divided into different phases.
