= Christian County, Kentucky =

County in Kentucky, United States

- County
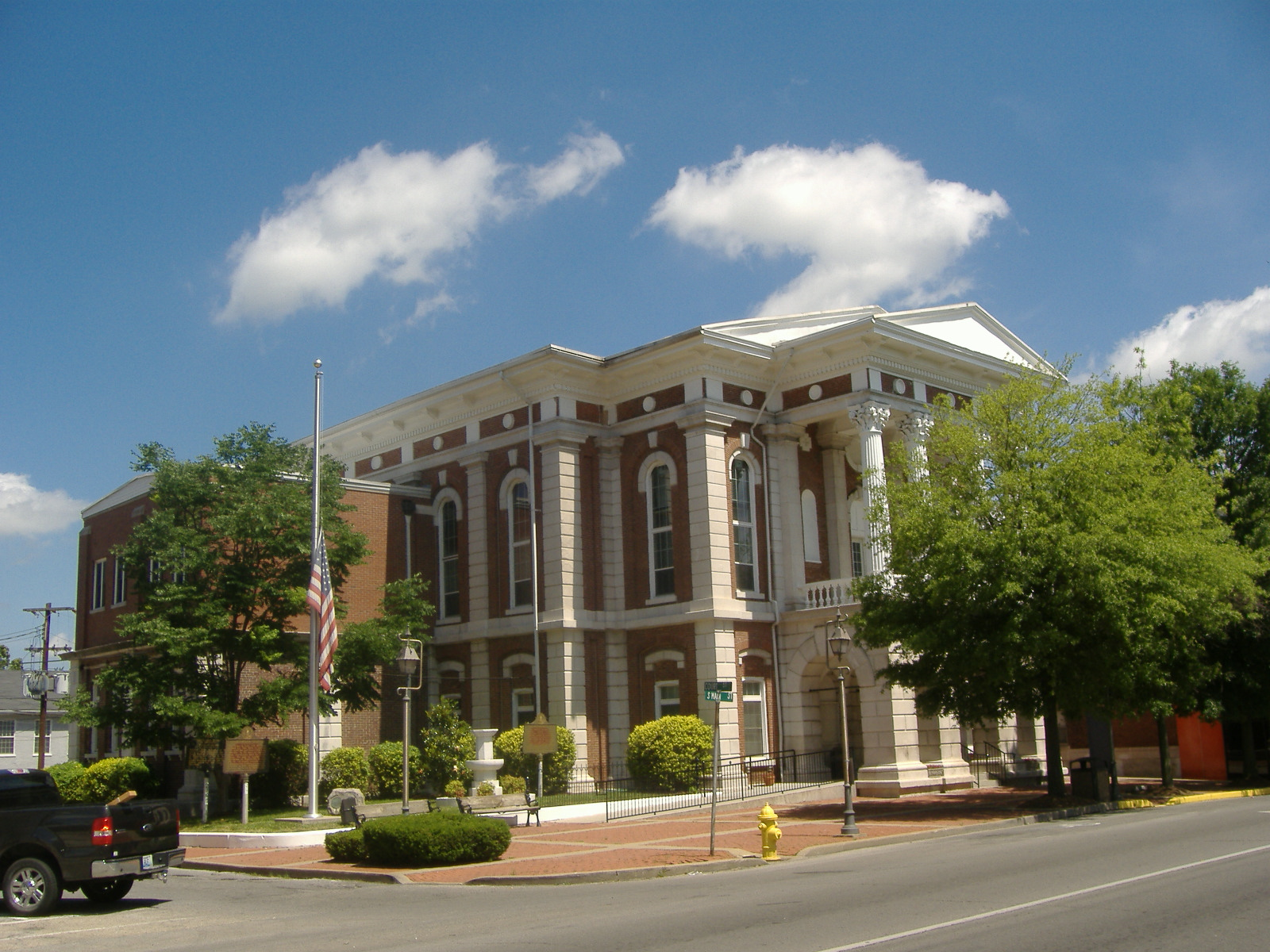
- Christian County courthouse in Hopkinsville

- Location within the U.S. state of Kentucky
- Coordinates: 36°54′N 87°29′W
- Country: United States
- State: Kentucky
- Founded: 1797
- Named for: William Christian
- Seat: Hopkinsville
- Largest city: Hopkinsville

Government
  - Judge/Executive: Jerry Gilliam (R)

Area
  - Total: 724 sq mi (1,880 km^{2})
  - Land: 718 sq mi (1,860 km^{2})
  - Water: 6.5 sq mi (17 km^{2}) 0.9%

Population (2020)
  - Total: 72,748
  - Estimate (2025): 70,115 ▼
  - Density: 99/sq mi (38/km^{2})
- Time zone: UTC−6 (Central)
  - Summer (DST): UTC−5 (CDT)
- Congressional district: 1st
- Website: www.christiancountyky.gov

Christian County is a county located in the U.S. state of Kentucky. As of the 2020 census, the population was 72,748. Its county seat is Hopkinsville. The county was formed in 1797. Christian County is part of the Clarksville metropolitan area.

== History ==
The county is named for Colonel William Christian, a native of Augusta County, Virginia, and a veteran of the Revolutionary War. He settled near Louisville, Kentucky, in 1785, and was killed by Native Americans in southern Indiana in 1786.

Jefferson Davis, president of the Confederate States of America, was born in Fairview, Kentucky (in the small part that is now in Todd County), in 1808. United States Vice President Adlai Stevenson I was born in Christian County in 1835.

The present courthouse, built in 1869, replaced a structure burned by Confederate cavalry in 1864 because the Union Army was using it as their barracks.

In 1955, the town of Hopkinsville located in the county allegedly had a family and their close friends enter a close encounter between several alleged aliens during a dinner now known as the Kelly-Hopkinsville encounter

The United States Supreme Court case Barker v. Wingo, 407 U.S. 514 (1972), arose out of a 1958 double-murder in Christian County, Kentucky.

In 2006 and 2008, tornadoes touched down across northern Christian County, damaging homes in the Crofton area.

In 2017, northwestern Christian County was the point of greatest eclipse for the solar eclipse of August 21, 2017 that crossed North America. The center was in the Bainbridge/Sinking Fork area of the county, on the Orchardale farm.

== Geography ==
According to the United States Census Bureau, the county has a total area of 724 square miles (1,880 km^{2}), of which 718 square miles (1,860 km^{2}) is land and 6.5 square miles (17 km^{2}) (0.9%) is water. It is the second-largest county by area in Kentucky and the largest in Western Kentucky.

=== Adjacent counties ===
- Hopkins County (north)
- Muhlenberg County (northeast)
- Todd County (east)
- Montgomery County, Tennessee (southeast)
- Stewart County, Tennessee (southwest)
- Trigg County (west)
- Caldwell County (northwest)

== Demographics ==
Historical population
Census	Pop.	Note	%±
1800	2,318		—
1810	11,020		375.4%
1820	10,459		−5.1%
1830	12,684		21.3%
1840	15,587		22.9%
1850	19,580		25.6%
1860	21,627		10.5%
1870	23,227		7.4%
1880	31,682		36.4%
1890	34,118		7.7%
1900	37,962		11.3%
1910	38,845		2.3%
1920	35,883		−7.6%
1930	34,283		−4.5%
1940	36,129		5.4%
1950	42,359		17.2%
1960	56,904		34.3%
1970	56,224		−1.2%
1980	66,878		18.9%
1990	68,941		3.1%
2000	72,265		4.8%
2010	73,955		2.3%
2020	72,748		−1.6%
2025 (est.)	70,115	▼	−3.6%
U.S. Decennial Census; 1790-1960 1900-1990; 1990-2000 2010-2020 2024

=== 2020 census ===
As of the 2020 census, the county had a population of 72,748. The median age was 30.0 years. 26.2% of residents were under the age of 18 and 12.8% of residents were 65 years of age or older. For every 100 females there were 104.6 males, and for every 100 females age 18 and over there were 104.1 males age 18 and over.

The racial makeup of the county was 66.4% White, 21.3% Black or African American, 0.5% American Indian and Alaska Native, 1.3% Asian, 0.3% Native Hawaiian and Pacific Islander, 3.1% from some other race, and 7.0% from two or more races. Hispanic or Latino residents of any race comprised 7.9% of the population.

70.9% of residents lived in urban areas, while 29.1% lived in rural areas.

There were 26,435 households in the county, of which 35.9% had children under the age of 18 living with them and 28.8% had a female householder with no spouse or partner present. About 27.9% of all households were made up of individuals and 10.1% had someone living alone who was 65 years of age or older.

There were 29,206 housing units, of which 9.5% were vacant. Among occupied housing units, 49.9% were owner-occupied and 50.1% were renter-occupied. The homeowner vacancy rate was 1.4% and the rental vacancy rate was 8.1%.

=== 2000 census ===
As of the census of 2000, there were 72,265 people, 24,857 households, and 18,344 families residing in the county. The population density was 100 per square mile (39/km^{2}). There were 27,182 housing units at an average density of 38 per square mile (15/km^{2}). The racial makeup of the county was 69.92% White, 23.73% Black or African American, 0.52% Native American, 0.91% Asian, 0.32% Pacific Islander, 2.23% from other races, and 2.37% from two or more races. 4.83% of the population were Hispanic or Latino of any race.

There were 24,857 households, out of which 41.10% had children under the age of 18 living with them, 57.00% were married couples living together, 13.60% had a female householder with no husband present, and 26.20% were non-families. 22.50% of all households were made up of individuals, and 8.50% had someone living alone who was 65 years of age or older. The average household size was 2.66 and the average family size was 3.12.

In the county, the population was spread out, with 28.30% under the age of 18, 15.80% from 18 to 24, 30.10% from 25 to 44, 16.00% from 45 to 64, and 9.80% who were 65 years of age or older. The median age was 28 years. For every 100 females, there were 106.60 males. For every 100 females age 18 and over, there were 107.60 males.

The median income for a household in the county was $31,177, and the median income for a family was $35,240. Males had a median income of $25,063 versus $20,748 for females. The per capita income for the county was $14,611. About 12.10% of families and 15.00% of the population were below the poverty line, including 19.30% of those under age 18 and 13.50% of those age 65 or over.

== Education ==
Most residents are zoned to Christian County Public Schools. However residents of Fort Campbell are zoned to Department of Defense Education Activity (DoDEA) schools.

=== High schools ===
- Christian County High School, established 1959
- Hopkinsville High School
- Fort Campbell High School (DoDEA) — physically located in Tennessee, but serving the entire Fort Campbell base, and a member of Kentucky's governing body for high school athletics, the Kentucky High School Athletic Association
- University Heights Academy (private K-12)
- Heritage Christian Academy (private K-12)

=== Colleges ===
- Hopkinsville Community College
- Murray State University (regional campuses in Hopkinsville and Ft. Campbell)

== Politics ==
United States presidential election results for Christian County, Kentucky
Year	Republican		Democratic		Third party(ies)	
Year	No.	%	No.	%	No.	%
1912	3,520	48.96%	2,784	38.73%	885	12.31%
1916	4,594	55.11%	3,644	43.71%	98	1.18%
1920	8,743	54.45%	7,209	44.90%	105	0.65%
1924	7,192	51.77%	6,585	47.40%	115	0.83%
1928	7,069	55.35%	5,702	44.65%	0	0.00%
1932	5,235	40.52%	7,618	58.96%	67	0.52%
1936	5,370	44.64%	6,660	55.36%	0	0.00%
1940	5,566	45.69%	6,599	54.17%	16	0.13%
1944	4,506	41.72%	6,260	57.96%	35	0.32%
1948	3,242	31.85%	5,582	54.83%	1,356	13.32%
1952	4,858	41.62%	6,787	58.15%	27	0.23%
1956	4,963	43.18%	6,487	56.43%	45	0.39%
1960	5,251	43.31%	6,874	56.69%	0	0.00%
1964	3,882	30.74%	8,727	69.10%	21	0.17%
1968	3,788	30.03%	4,281	33.94%	4,545	36.03%
1972	7,414	63.34%	4,063	34.71%	228	1.95%
1976	4,964	38.44%	7,845	60.75%	105	0.81%
1980	8,209	52.92%	7,048	45.44%	255	1.64%
1984	10,708	66.06%	5,432	33.51%	69	0.43%
1988	9,250	61.63%	5,704	38.01%	54	0.36%
1992	7,737	47.50%	6,709	41.19%	1,842	11.31%
1996	8,285	50.95%	6,843	42.08%	1,132	6.96%
2000	10,787	60.69%	6,778	38.14%	208	1.17%
2004	13,935	66.31%	6,970	33.17%	110	0.52%
2008	13,699	60.14%	8,880	38.98%	199	0.87%
2012	13,475	61.38%	8,252	37.59%	228	1.04%
2016	14,108	63.89%	7,188	32.55%	787	3.56%
2020	15,080	63.19%	8,296	34.77%	487	2.04%
2024	14,332	66.13%	7,055	32.56%	284	1.31%

=== Elected officials ===
Elected officials as of January 3, 2025
U.S. House	James Comer (R)	KY 1
Ky. Senate	Craig Richardson (R)	3
Ky. House	Walker Thomas (R)	8
Ky. House	Myron Dossett (R)	9
Ky. House	Jason Petrie (R)	16

== Communities ==
=== Cities ===
- Crofton
- Hopkinsville
- LaFayette
- Oak Grove
- Pembroke

=== Census-designated places ===
- Cerulean (mostly in Trigg County)
- Fairview (partially in Todd County)
- Fort Campbell North
- Gracey

=== Other unincorporated communities ===
- Apex
- Bainbridge
- Bennettstown
- Bluff Spring
- Casky
- Edgoten
- Empire
- Fearsville
- Fruit Hill
- Garrettsburg
- Hensleytown
- Herndon
- Honey Grove
- Howel
- Julien
- Kelly
- Mannington
- Newstead
- Saint Elmo
- Sinking Fork

== Notable people ==
- Terena Elizabeth Bell, author of Tell Me What You See
- Greg Buckner, former NBA player
- Edgar Cayce (1877–1945), mystic
- Anthony Hickey (born 1992), basketball player for Hapoel Haifa in the Israeli Basketball Premier League
- Ted Poston (1906–1974), known as the Dean of Black Journalists and a member of President Franklin Roosevelt's Black Cabinet
- Nori Reed, comedian and writer
- Adlai Stevenson I, 23rd Vice President of the United States (1893–1897), was born in Christian County
- Gloria Jean Watkins, feminist author known by her pen name, bell hooks
- Whitney Westerfield, politician
- Chris Whitney, former NBA player
- Ned Breathitt, 51st Governor of Kentucky 1963-1967

== See also ==
- National Register of Historic Places listings in Christian County, Kentucky
