= Hopkinsville, Kentucky =

- City
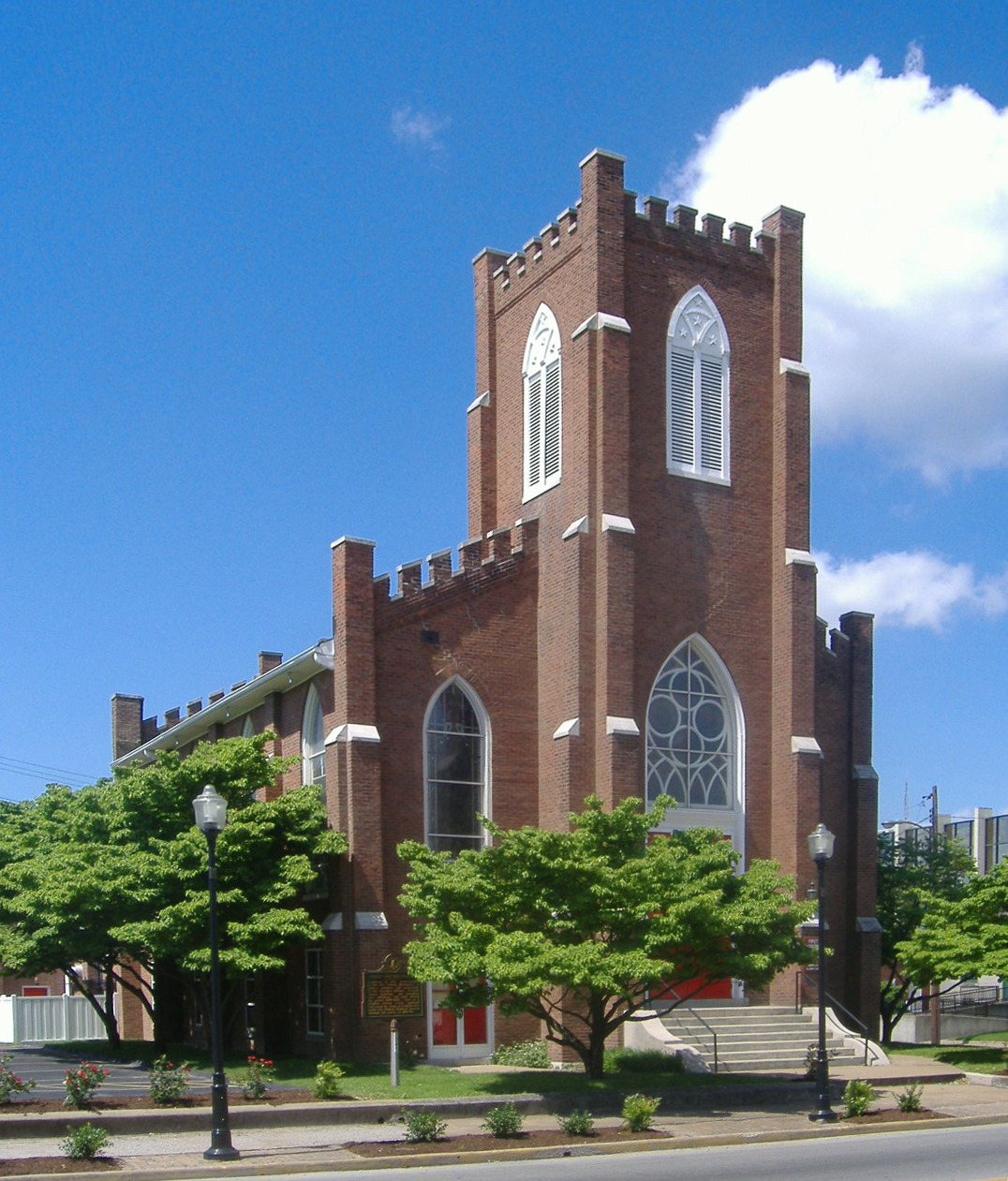
- Hopkinsville First Presbyterian Church
- Interactive map of Hopkinsville, Kentucky
- Location within Kentucky Location within the United States
- Coordinates: 36°51′17″N 87°29′20″W
- Country: United States
- State: Kentucky
- County: Christian
- Established: 1804
- Incorporated: 1853
- Named for: Samuel Hopkins

Government
  - Mayor: James R. Knight Jr. (R)

Area
  - Total: 31.97 sq mi (82.79 km^{2})
  - Land: 31.83 sq mi (82.44 km^{2})
  - Water: 0.14 sq mi (0.35 km^{2})
- Elevation: 528 ft (161 m)

Population (2020)
  - Total: 31,180
  - Estimate (2022): 30,927
  - Density: 979.6/sq mi (378.23/km^{2})
- Time zone: UTC−6 (CST)
  - Summer (DST): UTC−5 (CDT)
- ZIP code: 42240
- Area codes: 270 & 364
- FIPS code: 21-37918
- GNIS feature ID: 0494550
- Website: www.hopkinsvilleky.us

Hopkinsville is a city in and the county seat of Christian County, Kentucky, United States. The population at the 2020 census was 31,180. Hopkinsville is a home-rule class city under Kentucky law.

== History ==
=== Early years ===
The area of present-day Hopkinsville was initially claimed in 1796 by Bartholomew Wood as part of a 1,200-acre (5 km^{2}) grant for his service in the American Revolution. He and his wife Martha Ann moved from Jonesborough, Tennessee, first to a cabin near present-day W. Seventh and Bethel streets; then to a second cabin near present-day 9th and Virginia streets; and finally to a third home near 14th and Campbell.

Following the creation of Christian County the same year, the Woods donated 5 acres (20,000 m^{2}) of land and a half interest in their Old Rock Spring to form its seat of government in 1797. By 1798, a log courthouse, jail, and "stray pen" had been built; the next year, John Campbell and Samuel Means laid out the streets for "Christian Court House". The community tried to rename itself "Elizabeth" after the Woods' eldest daughter, but Elizabethtown, Kentucky pre-ëmpted the name, and the Kentucky Assembly established the town in 1804 as "Hopkinsville" after veteran and state representative Samuel Hopkins of Henderson County (later the namesake of Hopkins County as well and despite being in a neighboring county and having the same namesake, Hopkinsville was never the county seat of Hopkins County, despite Hopkins County being created from Christian and Henderson Counties).

Along with the rest of Kentucky, the town was late in establishing free lower education, but natives organized private schools, and the town was the home of South Kentucky College (est. 1849) and Bethel Female College (est. 1854).

Since 1854, Hopkinsville has been the site of the Western Kentucky Lunatic Asylum.

=== Civil War ===
The Civil War generated major divisions in Christian County. Confederate support in Hopkinsville and Christian County was evident in the formation of the "Oak Grove Rangers" and the 28th Kentucky Cavalry. Christian County was the actual birthplace of Jefferson Davis, president of the Confederate States of America, though his birthplace is now part of Todd County, Kentucky. Several local businessmen and plantation owners contributed money and war supplies to the South. After Confederate forces retreated to Tennessee, however, Camp Joe Anderson was established by the Union to the northwest of Hopkinsville in 1862. Men who trained there became members of the 35th Kentucky Cavalry, the 25th Kentucky Infantry, and the 35th Kentucky Infantry. Gen. James S. Jackson had been a Hopkinsville attorney before the war and was killed in service to the Union at the Battle of Perryville in October 1862. Private citizens who supported the Union cause provided the army with mules, wagons, clothing, and food.

The occupation of Hopkinsville changed at least half a dozen times between the Confederate and Union forces. In December 1864, Confederate troops under Gen. Hylan B. Lyon captured the town and burned down the Christian County courthouse which was being used at that time by the Union army as a barracks. Another skirmish between Union and Confederate forces took place in the field opposite Western State Hospital near the end of the war.

=== Black Patch tobacco ===
The Evansville, Henderson, and Nashville Railroad was the first to connect Hopkinsville to surrounding cities in 1868. In 1879, it was purchased by the L&N. The Ohio Valley Railroad (later purchased by the Illinois Southern) reached the city in 1892, as did the Tennessee Central in 1903.

The tobacco from the Black Patch region was highly desired in Europe. In 1904, tobacco planters formed the Dark Tobacco District Planters' Protective Association of Kentucky and Tennessee in opposition to a corporate monopoly by the American Tobacco Company (ATC) owned by James B. Duke. The ATC used their monopoly power to reduce the prices they paid to farmers; the planters' association aimed to organize a boycott of sales to drive the price back up. Many farmers continued to sell independently or secretly, however, prompting the association to form a "Silent Brigade" to pressure such farmers into compliance. With societal pressure seeming to fail, the Silent Brigade (probably under Dr. David A. Amoss) organized the Night Riders (not to be confused with the Ku Klux Klan) to terrorize farmers into submission.

On December 7, 1907, 250 masked Night Riders seized Hopkinsville's police station and cut off all outside contact. They pursued tobacco executives who bought tobacco from farmers who were not members of the Dark Tobacco District Planters' Protective Association and city officials who aided them. Three warehouses were burned, one of whose sites became Peace Park. In April of the next year, a tobacco broker in Paducah named W.B. Kennedy wrote to associates in Rotterdam that "Out of all the mischief that has been done the law has not been able to convict and punish the night-riders. They do their mischief in the night, and wear masks, and they have taken a pledge to never tell anybody anything they know, and for this reason it is impossible to get sufficient evidence to convict them. They have gone on with their mischief making, until they have almost ruined the country."

=== Kelly–Hopkinsville encounter ===
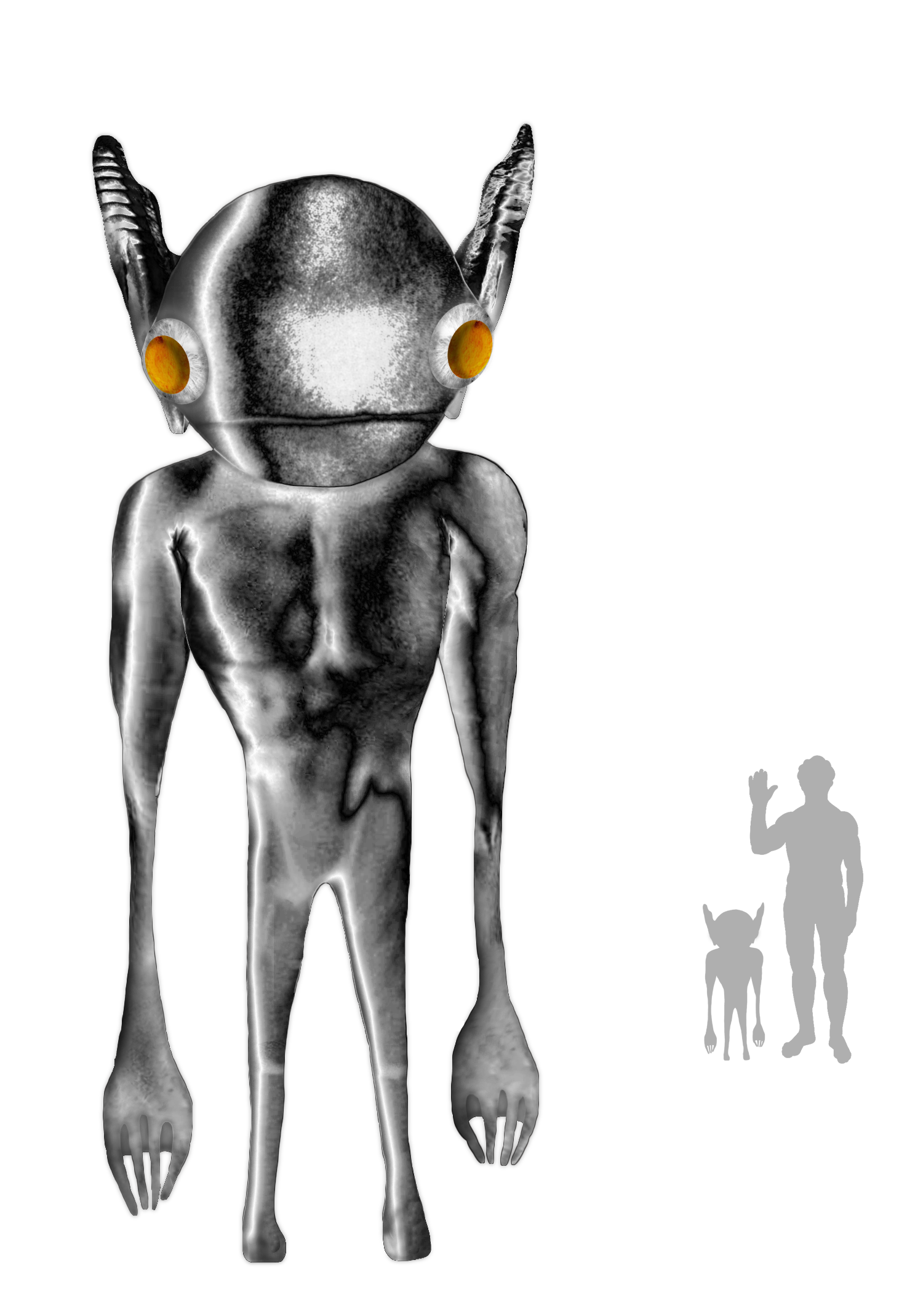
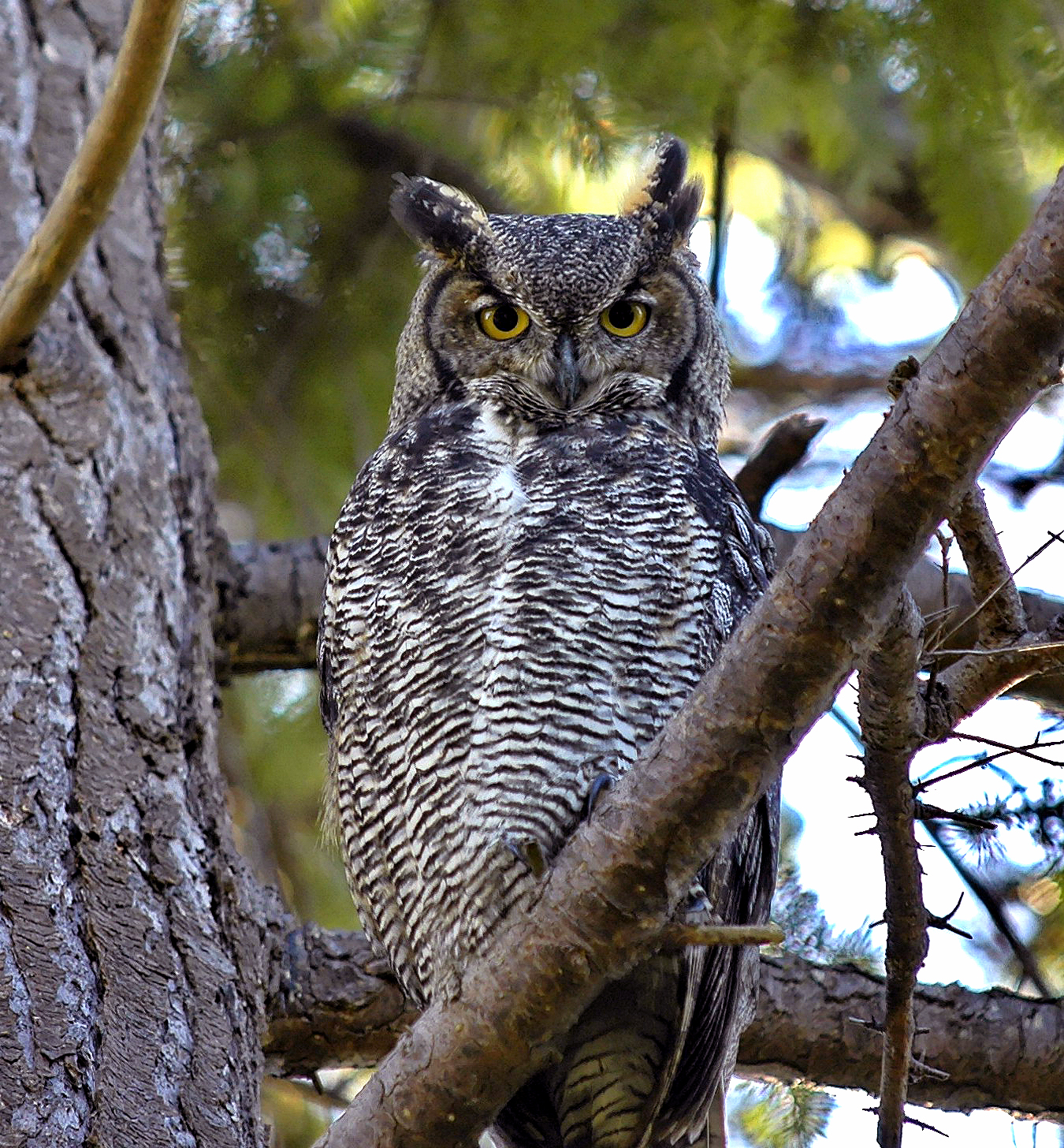
Left: a popular image of a "Hopkinsville Goblin". Right: a great horned owl, a hypothesized explanation.

Hopkinsville is also known for the Kelly–Hopkinsville encounter. This was a claimed close encounter with extraterrestrial beings that occurred near the communities of Kelly and Hopkinsville in Christian County, Kentucky, United States during the night and early morning of August 21–22, 1955. UFOlogists regard it as one of the most significant and well-documented cases in the history of UFO incidents, while skeptics maintain there was no actual physical evidence that the encounter ever took place and the reports were due to "the effects of excitement" and misidentification of natural phenomena such as meteors and owls.

=== Tornadoes ===
On April 2, 2006, an F3 tornado swept through parts of Hopkinsville. In the storm, 200 homes were damaged and 28 people were injured. In addition, structural damage was reported to dozens of other businesses, along with countless trees, power lines, transmission towers and other structures, cutting electricity to the city of Hopkinsville. A gas line was also damaged, causing a gas leak. On January 1, 2022, an EF2 tornado struck Hopkinsville, removing the canopy from a gas station, and destroying the petrol pumps. A church lost parts of its roof, and trees were snapped and some uprooted along the path. This was the first confirmed tornado of 2022.

On March 31, 2023, the downtown area sustained noteworthy damage from straight-line winds of up to 90 mph, lifting off the upper floor of restaurant The Mixer in the former Young Hardware space, as well as damaging the city's clock tower and the Woody Winfree Fire and Transportation Museum.

== Geography ==
Hopkinsville is located south of the center of Christian County at 36°51′17″N 87°29′20″W (36.854712, −87.488872). Madisonville is 35 miles (56 km) to the north, Russellville is 35 miles (56 km) to the east, Oak Grove is 15 miles to the south, and Clarksville, Tennessee, is 26 miles (42 km) to the south.

According to the United States Census Bureau, Hopkinsville has a total area of 30.8 square miles (79.8 km^{2}), of which 30.6 square miles (79.3 km^{2}) is land and 0.15 square miles (0.4 km^{2}), or 0.44%, is water.

=== Climate ===
Hopkinsville has a humid subtropical climate (Köppen Cfa), with hot, humid summers and cool winters. Precipitation is abundant and well-spread, with an average of 49.1 inches (1,250 mm). Snowfall is light and sporadic, with an average of 9.8 inches (25 cm).

The data below was accessed via the WRCC and was collected from 1896 until 2018.

Climate data for Hopkinsville, Kentucky, (1991–2020 normals, extremes 1896–present)
Month	Jan	Feb	Mar	Apr	May	Jun	Jul	Aug	Sep	Oct	Nov	Dec	Year
Record high °F (°C)	78 (26)	82 (28)	94 (34)	95 (35)	100 (38)	106 (41)	110 (43)	111 (44)	108 (42)	98 (37)	87 (31)	78 (26)	111 (44)
Mean daily maximum °F (°C)	43.8 (6.6)	48.4 (9.1)	58.1 (14.5)	69.1 (20.6)	77.2 (25.1)	84.8 (29.3)	88.2 (31.2)	87.5 (30.8)	81.9 (27.7)	70.9 (21.6)	58.0 (14.4)	47.0 (8.3)	67.9 (19.9)
Daily mean °F (°C)	35.5 (1.9)	39.6 (4.2)	48.0 (8.9)	58.1 (14.5)	67.4 (19.7)	75.5 (24.2)	79.1 (26.2)	77.9 (25.5)	71.4 (21.9)	59.7 (15.4)	48.1 (8.9)	39.2 (4.0)	58.3 (14.6)
Mean daily minimum °F (°C)	27.2 (−2.7)	30.7 (−0.7)	37.8 (3.2)	47.1 (8.4)	57.7 (14.3)	66.2 (19.0)	70.0 (21.1)	68.2 (20.1)	60.8 (16.0)	48.6 (9.2)	38.2 (3.4)	31.4 (−0.3)	48.7 (9.3)
Record low °F (°C)	−20 (−29)	−22 (−30)	−3 (−19)	20 (−7)	30 (−1)	40 (4)	45 (7)	41 (5)	31 (−1)	20 (−7)	−4 (−20)	−14 (−26)	−22 (−30)
Average precipitation inches (mm)	3.41 (87)	4.06 (103)	4.76 (121)	4.81 (122)	5.38 (137)	4.26 (108)	4.87 (124)	4.29 (109)	3.54 (90)	3.79 (96)	3.90 (99)	4.69 (119)	51.76 (1,315)
Average snowfall inches (cm)	1.8 (4.6)	1.8 (4.6)	0.8 (2.0)	0.1 (0.25)	0.0 (0.0)	0.0 (0.0)	0.0 (0.0)	0.0 (0.0)	0.0 (0.0)	0.0 (0.0)	0.0 (0.0)	0.7 (1.8)	5.2 (13)
Average precipitation days (≥ 0.01 in)	10.2	10.1	11.7	11.5	11.9	10.0	8.9	7.3	7.8	7.8	10.3	11.0	118.5
Average snowy days (≥ 0.1 in)	1.3	1.4	0.5	0.1	0.0	0.0	0.0	0.0	0.0	0.1	0.0	0.8	4.2
Source: NOAA

== Demographics ==
Historical population
Census	Pop.	Note	%±
1810	131		—
1830	1,263		—
1840	1,581		25.2%
1860	2,289		—
1870	3,136		37.0%
1880	4,229		34.9%
1890	5,833		37.9%
1900	7,280		24.8%
1910	9,419		29.4%
1920	9,696		2.9%
1930	10,746		10.8%
1940	11,724		9.1%
1950	12,526		6.8%
1960	19,465		55.4%
1970	21,395		9.9%
1980	27,318		27.7%
1990	29,809		9.1%
2000	30,089		0.9%
2010	31,577		4.9%
2020	31,180		−1.3%
2025 (est.)	30,411		−2.5%

=== 2020 census ===
As of the 2020 census, Hopkinsville had a population of 31,180. The median age was 38.3 years. 24.2% of residents were under the age of 18 and 17.4% of residents were 65 years of age or older. For every 100 females there were 89.9 males, and for every 100 females age 18 and over there were 84.5 males age 18 and over.

97.5% of residents lived in urban areas, while 2.5% lived in rural areas.

There were 13,004 households in Hopkinsville, of which 30.3% had children under the age of 18 living in them. Of all households, 34.2% were married-couple households, 19.8% were households with a male householder and no spouse or partner present, and 38.8% were households with a female householder and no spouse or partner present. About 34.8% of all households were made up of individuals and 13.8% had someone living alone who was 65 years of age or older.

There were 14,369 housing units, of which 9.5% were vacant. The homeowner vacancy rate was 1.5% and the rental vacancy rate was 9.1%.

Racial composition as of the 2020 census
Race	Number	Percent
White	18,255	58.5%
Black or African American	9,719	31.2%
American Indian and Alaska Native	146	0.5%
Asian	412	1.3%
Native Hawaiian and Other Pacific Islander	25	0.1%
Some other race	661	2.1%
Two or more races	1,962	6.3%
Hispanic or Latino (of any race)	1,564	5.0%

=== Income and poverty ===
According to the U.S. Census Bureau's QuickFacts, the median household income was $39,743 and 23% of people lived in poverty.

=== 2010 census ===
As of the census of 2010, there were 31,577 people, 12,600 households and 14,318 housing units in the city of Hopkinsville. The racial makeup of the city was 62.6% White, 31.9% African American, 0.4% Native American, 1.1% Asian, 0.1% Pacific Islander, 3.5% from Hispanic or Latino origin, 61.1% White persons not Hispanic (U.S. Census), and 2.5% from two or more races.

=== 2000 census ===
There were 12,174 households, out of which 32.4% had children under the age of 18 living with them, 45.1% were married couples living together, 18.2% had a female householder with no husband present, and 33.3% were non-families. 29.7% of all households were made up of individuals, and 12.5% had someone living alone who was 65 years of age or older. The average household size was 2.39 and the average family size was 2.95.

In the city, the population was spread out, with 26.4% under the age of 18, 9.7% from 18 to 24, 28.3% from 25 to 44, 20.8% from 45 to 64, and 14.8% who were 65 years of age or older. The median age was 35 years. For every 100 females, there were 87.9 males. For every 100 females age 18 and over, there were 82.7 males.

The median income for a household in the city was $30,419, and the median income for a family was $37,598. Males had a median income of $30,349 versus $21,259 for females. The per capita income for the city was $15,796.

== Economy ==
Hopkinsville-Christian County is home to a wide range of businesses and industries, including Fortune 500 companies. Over 50 companies make up the local industrial community. Local industries provide a range of services and manufactured products.

There are nine Japanese companies (wholly owned or joint ventures) in Hopkinsville, as well as one German, Spanish, Canadian and Italian.

The Western State Hospital, established in 1854 as the Western Lunatic Asylum, is an inpatient center for the treatment of mental illness. It is on the National Register of Historic Places. The inpatient population as of 2004 was 220, from 34 counties in western Kentucky. Its three facilities employed 650 workers in 2004.

Hopkinsville was the headquarters and primary manufacturing facility for Ebonite International, one of the oldest and largest bowling ball manufacturers. Ebonite had a broad market share as they own several well-known brand names including Hammer, Dyno-Thane, Columbia 300, Track, and Robby's. The Hopkinsville plants produced 60 percent of the world's bowling balls before their closing in November 2019 when they were purchased by Brunswick Bowling Products.

In August 2022, Ascend Elements Inc., a producer of advanced, sustainable battery materials made new from recycled lithium-ion batteries, (pCAM and lithium carbonate, a critical mineral), announced an investment that will scale up to $1 billion, in a 450,000-square-foot facility, and create 400 jobs. Schedule to be operational in late 2026. In August 2026, it was reported that Ascend filed for Chapter 11 bankruptcy protection earlier this year, and the plant was purchased at auction by Turner-Kokosing Industrial Joint Venture, the construction team building the plant. According to Turner-Kokosing, construction is about 65% complete, and the new owner says the facility will be completed. Turner-Kokosing is in the process of selling the facility to a potential manufacturer.

In December 2025, Toyota Boshoku America, a member of the Toyota Group of companies, opened its new $225 million, 354,340-square-foot, smart plant facility, located on 48 acres, producing interior systems for several major automakers.

=== Advanced Graphite Solutions ===
In September 2025, ExxonMobil announced that it is acquiring key assets, and technology of Superior Graphite, including a production facility in Hopkinsville, for an undisclosed price. The facility in southern Kentucky, will see investment that allows it to scale up, and create ultra-pure synthetic graphite production at commercial levels by 2029. ExxonMobil said acquiring Superior Graphite "… marks a major milestone in our strategy to build a robust, synthetic graphite supply chain — right here in the U.S."
ExxonMobil Advanced Graphite Solutions, is the new name as it appears on signage at the facility for the operations, and assets acquired from Superior Graphite.

=== Agribusiness ===
Hopkinsville-Christian County has strong agricultural roots dating back to the settlements in the 1790s. It has been a strong and consistent leader in the production of corn, winter wheat, soybeans, and tobacco.

Statistics released in December 2007, by the Kentucky Department of Agriculture, show Christian County continues to be a leading crop producer. Christian County ranks:

- #1 crops for cash receipts
- #1 winter wheat
- #2 corn
- #3 dark fired tobacco
- #4 soybeans

Other key production includes burley tobacco, alfalfa hay, other hay, cattle, and calves and milk production. The county is the second largest in area in Kentucky at 722 square miles (1,870 km^{2}) and has an estimated 1,150 farms with over 300,000 acres (1,200 km^{2}) of farmland, with 230,000 acres (930 km^{2}) in cropland. The average size farm is 267 acres (1.08 km^{2}).

Agriculture has become a highly technical industry, and Christian County farmers realized the need for continuing education and technical training concerning implements, machinery, fertilizers, chemicals, seeds, and overall good farming practice. Because of this progressive attitude, Christian County continues to be an agricultural leader and example of good farming practices. The Hopkinsville Community College has a technical center specializing in agricultural classes. FFA classes at local high schools have over 200 members. The local 4-H group is extremely active serving over a thousand members in a variety of subjects.

The Chamber of Commerce maintains an Agri-Business Committee that promotes "Ag Week". The Agri-Business Committee promotes local agriculture with two events annually with a media blitz via newspaper, radio, and television; one in March during National Agriculture Week and again in July during Christian County Agriculture Week. It honors local farmers in the following four fields: Agri-Business of the Year, Farmer of the Year, Distinguished Service, and Friend of Agriculture. The committee also awards scholarships each year to a student who will pursue an agricultural course in college.

=== Top employers ===
According to Hopkinsville's 2020 Comprehensive Annual Financial Report, the top employers in the city were:

#	Employer	# of Employees
1	Fort Campbell Army Post	4,469
2	Christian County Board of Education	1,326
3	Martinrea	900
4	Walmart Distribution Center 6066	884
5	T.RAD North America	825
6	Jennie Stuart Medical Center	808
7	Western State Psychiatric Hospital	757
8	TeleTech Services Corporation	671
9	Grupo Antolin Kentucky Inc.	568
10	TG Automotive Sealing Kentucky	420

== Arts and culture ==
Hopkinsville is home to The Alhambra, a 650-seat theatre established in 1928. It opened as a film cinema but had been a performance venue since 1983, when operations were taken over by the Pennyroyal Arts Council.

Created in 1977, the Pennyroyal Arts Council encourages, develops, and promotes the arts appreciation through education, support, service, and presentation. Programming includes the Live at the Alhambra series, public school performances, the Missoula Children's Theatre, and local art exhibits.

The Hopkinsville Art Guild provides exhibition and educational opportunities for visual arts.

From the 1930s to the 1960s, Hopkinsville had two stops on the Chitlin' Circuit tour route, The Skylark and The Chesterfield, which featured Black musical performers like Tina Turner, Count Bassie, Chubby Checker, James Brown, Little Richard, and Cab Calloway.

Hopkinsville was a stop along the Trail of Tears, and the National Park System's "Trail of Tears Commemorative Park," along 9th Street on the Little River, commemorates this history. Every September, the Trail of Tears Indian Pow-Wow comes to town to Trail of Tears Park. There is a museum and a burial ground, including two important Cherokee leaders who died during the removal – Fly Smith and Whitepath, along with several large osage orange trees in it and dream catchers hanging from the wrought iron fence. There is also a sunken amphitheater. A group of plaques commemorate the great uprooting and journey, and its devastating effect upon the Cherokee people. It is listed in the National Register of Historic Places.

The Pennyroyal Area Museum, located in the old post office building downtown, has exhibits on the history of Hopkinsville and the Pennyrile region. The Pennyroyal Area Museum is owned and funded by the city of Hopkinsville and was established to perpetuate the heritage of southwestern Kentucky's rich history. In 1974, the city of Hopkinsville acquired the old Post Office building from the U.S. government for use as an educational museum. The Pennyroyal Area Museum was established in October 1975, and opened on July 8, 1976. Its board and staff maintain a wide range of activities in its endeavor to preserve and interpret the past. Area citizens have contributed important roles in the Kentucky tradition from the post revolution era to the present. Historical in scope, the museum attempts to portray the development of the nine county Pennyrile region. Exhibits include the night riders of the Black Patch Tobacco Wars; Edgar Cayce, famed local clairvoyant; Jefferson Davis; period room settings; a pioneer bedroom; a miniature circus; antique quilts; black history; historic modes of transportation; as well as historical license plates from Kentucky.

Every May, Hopkinsville hosts Little River Days, a two-day family fun festival featuring road running, canoe racing, a bicycle tour, arts and crafts, food vendors and live entertainment. All activities take place at Merchant Park in downtown Hopkinsville.

During the total solar eclipse on August 21, 2017, Hopkinsville was the closest metropolitan area to the point of greatest eclipse, which occurred about 12 miles (19 km) northwest of the city center in nearby Cerulean, Kentucky.

The opening text of the horror-comedy film Attack of the Killer Tomatoes notes that Hopkinsville was invaded by millions of black birds in 1975. While damage was caused around Hopkinsville, the birds actually roosted in nearby Fort Campbell.

== Education ==
=== Public schools ===
Hopkinsville is part of the Christian County Public Schools system.

In August 2021, Christian County Public Schools Board voted to consolidate Christian County High School, Hopkinsville High School and two Gateway Academy Campuses into one College & Career Academy High School. The planned opening of the school is the Fall semester of 2026, with Christian County High School and Hopkinsville High School closing the same semester. The school will be named after Christian County High School.

=== Private schools ===
There are three private schools in Hopkinsville:

- Heritage Christian Academy, college preparatory Christian school; preschool through twelfth grade
- Saints Peter and Paul Catholic School, Catholic school; preschool through eighth grade
- University Heights Academy, college preparatory school; preschool through twelfth grade

=== Library ===
Hopkinsville has a lending library, the Hopkinsville-Christian County Public Library.

The Hopkinsville Carnegie Library was opened in 1914. It served the community until 1977, then sat vacant until restoration was begun in 2007. Currently the restoration is 2/3 complete, and the ground floor is now open and available for rent as an event space. The exterior has been completely restored.

== Media ==
The Kentucky New Era, founded in 1869, is the daily newspaper for the city and surrounding area.

Hopkinsville is part of the Nashville, Tennessee television designated market area (DMA). From 1983 to 2011, the city had its own local news station, WKAG, initially known in the area as TV-43 then as Source 16.

WHVO radio began broadcasting in Hopkinsville with the call letters WKOA on September 19, 1954, under the license of Pennyrile Broadcasting Company. It was a middle-of-the-road (MOR format) in the 1970s, and then a big band/oldies format during the mid-1980s. The station's callsigns changed to WYKH on August 1, 1986. On December 14, 1987, the station changed its call sign to WQKS. WQKS was acquired by the station's current owner, Ham Broadcasting, in October 1995. The current WHVO callsigns came on May 16, 2000.

The Hoptown Chronicle is a "nonprofit, online news outlet that provides public service journalism from the heart of Hopkinsville."

== Transportation ==
=== Road ===
Hopkinsville is intersected by US 41, US 41A, US 68, US 68 Bypass, and the Interstate 169 (formerly Pennyrile Parkway). A four-lane bypass almost completely circles the city. The Southern portion of the bypass is the route for US 68 Bypass. Congressional funding approved for an extension of the Pennyrile Parkway (now I-169) to Interstate 24 in southern Christian County near Fort Campbell. Construction was completed in three phases. Phase One took the parkway to the US 68 bypass. Phase Two extended it to Lover's Lane. Phase Three, completed in late 2010 but not opened until early 2011, extended the parkway to meet I-24.

=== Air ===
All commercial air traffic for residents and visitors to Hopkinsville use Nashville International Airport. Hopkinsville is served by the Hopkinsville-Christian County Airport, a general aviation airport with one 5,502-foot (1,700 m) runway.

=== Rail ===
Railroad construction and operation in the late 1860s opened markets for agricultural and industrial products. Railroad service was inaugurated in Hopkinsville on April 8, 1868, by the Evansville, Henderson, & Nashville Railroad. This line was later extended north to Henderson and was acquired by the Louisville & Nashville Railroad (now CSX Transportation) in 1879. The Ohio Valley Railroad, purchased by the Illinois Central Railroad (now Illinois Central Gulf) in 1897, was built from Gracey to Hopkinsville in 1892 and abandoned in the 1980s. In 1903, the western division of the Tennessee Central Railway entered Christian County at Edgoten (Edge-of-Tennessee), connecting Clarksville and Hopkinsville. In 1990 the Hopkinsville-Fort Campbell portion was operated by the U.S. Department of Defense.

== Notable people ==
- George L. Atkins, former mayor of Hopkinsville (1972–1975)
- Bird Averitt, former NBA and ABA guard
- Ned Breathitt, former governor of Kentucky
- John Brim, musician and composer.
- Greg Buckner, NBA shooting guard
- Harry Buckner, baseball pitcher and outfielder in the Negro leagues
- Edgar Cayce (1877–1945), an American Christian mystic and psychic
- Jerry Claiborne, former college football coach for the Kentucky Wildcats
- Edward M. Coffman, military historian
- John Miller Cooper, pioneer of kinesiology
- Tony Crunk, children's book author and poet
- Logan Feland, United States Marine Corps Major General
- Bettiola Heloise Fortson (1890–1917), poet, civil rights activist, suffragist
- Steve Gorman, drummer for The Black Crowes
- Asbury Harpending, financier and adventurer
- bell hooks (1952–2021), feminist author and social activist
- Larry Jones, thoroughbred racing trainer since 1982, former commercial farmer
- Mac King, comedic magician
- Margaret Rose Knight (1918–2010), First Lady of North Carolina, 1961–1965
- Brice Long, country music artist
- Riccardo Martin, operatic tenor
- Lane McCray, International recording artist, La Bouche
- Teresa Medeiros, award-winning romance novelist
- Doug Moseley, former member of the Kentucky State Senate
- Artose Pinner, NFL running back
- Christine Johnson Smith, opera singer and Tony Award-nominated Broadway actress
- Lynn Starling, screenwriter and playwright
- Adlai Stevenson (1835–1914), politician, 23rd vice-president of the United States
- Keith Tandy, NFL safety
- Cory Trice, NFL cornerback for the Pittsburgh Steelers
- Thomas R. Underwood, former congressman and U.S. senator
- Ed Whitfield, former congressman
- Chris Whitney, former NBA point guard
- Moe Williams, NFL running back, thoroughbred owner and trainer

== Sister city ==
- Carentan, France (since 2019). A road in Hopkinsville was renamed "Carentan Way".

== See also ==
- Kelly–Hopkinsville encounter, a close encounter which occurred in 1955
