= Tornado outbreak of October 17–19, 2007 =

2007 tornado outbreak in the United States

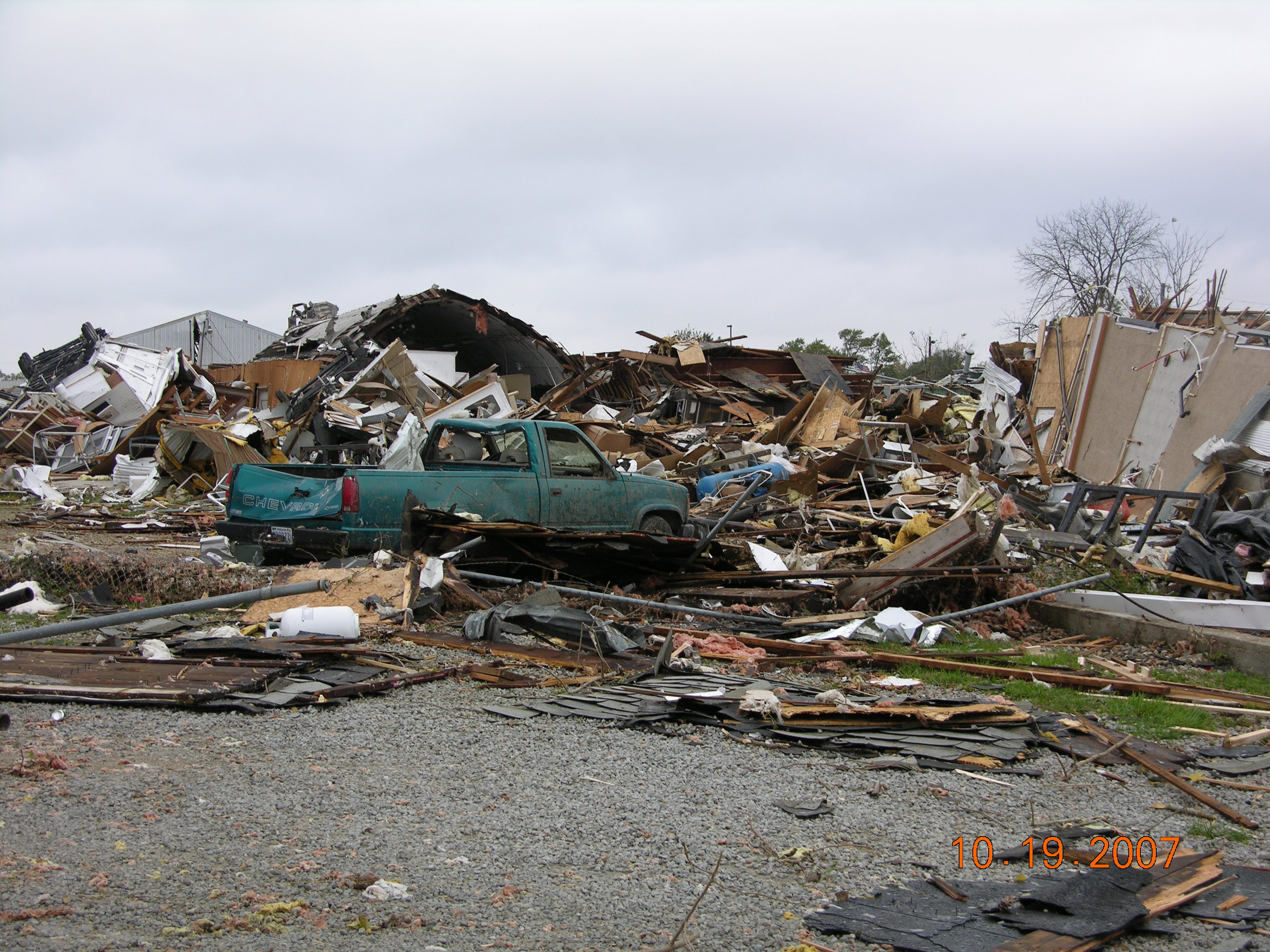
- EF3 damage in Nappanee, Indiana, on October 18, 2007

Meteorological history
- Duration: October 17–19, 2007

Tornado outbreak
- Tornadoes: 63
- Max. rating: EF3 tornado
- Duration: ~40 hours

Overall effects
- Casualties: 5 deaths, 28 injuries (+58 non-tornadic)
- Damage: $54.2 million (2007 USD)
- Areas affected: Central and Southern United States
- Part of the tornado outbreaks of 2007

The tornado outbreak of October 17–19, 2007 was a widespread tornado outbreak that took place across much of the eastern half of North America starting on October 17, 2007, and continuing into the early hours of October 19. The outbreak was also responsible for five deaths; three in Michigan and two in Missouri, plus many injuries (including some from non-tornadic events). At least 64 tornadoes were confirmed including 16 on October 17 across six states including Texas, Oklahoma, Arkansas, Louisiana, Mississippi and Missouri with wind damage reported in Oklahoma, Kansas, Illinois, Iowa, Arkansas and Mississippi. On October 18, at least 48 tornadoes were confirmed across eight states including Florida, Alabama, Mississippi, Tennessee, Kentucky, Illinois, Indiana and Michigan, plus widespread straight line wind damage. Until 2010, this event held the record for largest tornado outbreak ever recorded in the month of October according to NOAA.

== Meteorological synopsis ==
A deep low pressure system (with a pressure of 977 mbar at its peak) moved across the Pacific Coast on October 15 and then crossed the Rockies during the following day and touched out some moist air from the Gulf of Mexico, a major source for storm development and intensification. Not part of the main outbreak, 3 tornadoes were reported, during the overnight hours of October 16 towards October 17, across Randall County, Texas south of Amarillo on October 16 with one of them confirmed as a high-end EF1; that tornado caused damage to trees, fences, power poles, steel pipes, trailers, and barns.

The next day, a dry line, which separates the drier air from the more moist and humid air, formed ahead of the cold front across the Texas and Oklahoma Panhandles and tracked eastward. The high humidity levels with dew points in the 70s°F (low 20s°C), temperatures that in many areas were near 80 °F (27 °C), strong wind shear, and the presence of the dry line helped develop the instability to produce severe thunderstorms across both the Midwest and the Southern Plains on October 17.

A moderate risk for severe weather was issued by the Storm Prediction Center two days prior to the event. The storm then moved across most of the Midwest on October 18, where a moderate risk was in effect, also for two days for most of Illinois, Indiana, and parts of Kentucky; however, the moderate risk was revised further to the south and the east to include western Ohio, western Tennessee, southeastern Missouri, northeastern Arkansas, and a larger portion of Kentucky. Both Michigan and Wisconsin were no longer under a moderate risk. A slight risk of severe weather was forecast for a large area from beyond the Canada–US border to the Florida Panhandle and the Mobile Bay area. Dew points above 70 °F (21 °C) were reported well into the Ohio Valley, and those over 60 °F (16 °C) were reported as far north as northern Ontario.

The outbreak was expected to continue into October 19 east of the Appalachian Mountains, but extensive cloud cover prevented any significant severe storms from developing; even though, several wind reports were reported in Pennsylvania, New Jersey, and Massachusetts. The storm then moved out into the Atlantic Ocean on October 20.

== Tornadoes confirmed ==
Confirmed tornadoes by Enhanced Fujita rating
EFU	EF0	EF1	EF2	EF3	EF4	EF5	Total
0	19	26	15	3	0	0	63

=== October 17 event ===
List of confirmed tornadoes – Wednesday, October 17, 2007 (Note: All dates are based on the local time zone where the tornado touched down; however, all times are in Coordinated Universal Time for consistency.)
EF#	Location	County / Parish	State	Start Coord.	Time (UTC)	Path length	Max width	Summary
EF0	SW of Buna	Jasper	TX	30.41°N 94.01°W	15:32–15:34	1 mi (1.6 km)	20 yd (18 m)	A brief tornado downed a few trees.
EF0	W of Centerview	Johnson	MO	38.75°N 93.86°W	21:05–21:06	0.1 mi (0.16 km)	25 yd (23 m)	A brief tornado caused no damage.
EF0	NE of Fort Towson	Choctaw	OK	34.0507°N 95.233°W	22:14	0.1 mi (0.16 km)	50 yd (46 m)	A brief tornado remained over open country and caused no damage.
EF1	Franklinton	Washington	LA	30.85°N 90.15°W	22:45–22:47	0.2 mi (0.32 km)	25 yd (23 m)	A tornado moved directly through Franklinton, where three businesses sustained major roof damage and had windows blown out.
EF2	N of Verona to SSW of Chesapeake	Lawrence	MO	36.9917°N 93.8°W	22:46–23:04	10.11 mi (16.27 km)	150 yd (140 m)	Nine houses were damaged or destroyed, along with a lumber mill and several barns.
EF1	N of Franklinton	Washington	LA	30.9223°N 90.15°W	22:55–22:57	0.2 mi (0.32 km)	25 yd (23 m)	A tornado moved a car 15 ft (4.6 m), uprooted trees, and caused major roof damage to a mobile home.
EF1	SSW of Feenyville to W of Yorktown	Lincoln	AR	33.9502°N 91.9149°W	23:07–23:14	5.37 mi (8.64 km)	440 yd (400 m)	Six mobile homes were damaged or destroyed and four houses sustained minor damage. Widespread tree and power line damage occurred.
EF1	SSW of Carson	Jefferson Davis	MS	31.46°N 89.83°W	00:30–00:31	0.35 mi (0.56 km)	100 yd (91 m)	A storage building was destroyed while another had its roof torn off. An addition to a house had a portion of the roof blown off, and several trees were downed.
EF1	W of Cave Spring	Greene	MO	37.35°N 93.4882°W	00:35–00:40	2.8 mi (4.5 km)	100 yd (91 m)	Two houses and a barn were damaged.
EF1	ENE of Mammoth Springs to NNW of Glendale	Forrest	MS	31.3762°N 89.3304°W	01:10–01:12	1.59 mi (2.56 km)	200 yd (180 m)	Tornado began at Exit 69 on Interstate 59, where a car was blown off the roadway, injuring the occupant. A garage had its roof blown off and a house sustained minor roof damage. Additionally, two metal buildings had their metal doors torn off.
EF0	Tolarville	Holmes	MS	33.05°N 90.23°W	03:03–03:05	2.37 mi (3.81 km)	25 yd (23 m)	Several trees were downed and limbs were snapped in Tolarville.
EF0	N of Morgan	Laclede	MO	37.5634°N 92.68°W	04:35–04:36	0.1 mi (0.16 km)	35 yd (32 m)	A tornado damaged trees, telephone poles and moved a mobile home off of its foundation.
EF0	SE of Hatton	Callaway	MO	39.0093°N 92.0102°W	04:55–04:56	0.53 mi (0.85 km)	30 yd (27 m)	A horse stable, a double wide mobile home, a large garage, and several trees were damaged.
EF0	NW of Tulip to SSW of Holliday	Monroe	MO	39.3743°N 92.2107°W	04:55–05:00	3.97 mi (6.39 km)	40 yd (37 m)	Two machine sheds were damaged as the tornado tracked across mostly farmland. Corn was flattened in farm fields and trees were damaged as well.
EF2	SE of Granville	Monroe	MO	39.5238°N 92.0532°W	05:05–05:09	4.07 mi (6.55 km)	90 yd (82 m)	2 deaths - A high-end EF2 tornado obliterated a mobile home, barn, and a machine shed. The frame of the mobile home was found 1/3 of a mile away, and the two occupants were thrown hundreds of yards into a field and killed. Pieces of debris from the mobile home, barn, and shed were found up to 4 miles away.
EF0	WSW of North Fork	Monroe	MO	39.5942°N 91.9807°W	05:07–05:09	1.72 mi (2.77 km)	50 yd (46 m)	Trees and a machine shed were damaged.

=== October 18 event ===
List of confirmed tornadoes – Thursday, October 18, 2007
EF#	Location	County / Parish	State	Start Coord.	Time (UTC)	Path length	Max width	Summary
EF1	W of Vancleave	Jackson	MS	30.5333°N 88.7833°W	10:45–10:50	2.3 mi (3.7 km)	90 yd (82 m)	A tornado destroyed one mobile home and heavily damaged at least ten others. The tornado also destroyed several outbuildings, snapped trees, and knocked down power lines.
EF1	Pensacola	Escambia	FL	30.397°N 87.2426°W	15:10–15:25	5.62 mi (9.04 km)	150 yd (140 m)	Large tornado first touched down near the Pensacola Naval Air Station and tracked through parts of downtown Pensacola. Boats near the beginning of the path were flipped, and multiple homes were damaged, some heavily. A church lost part of its roof, bleachers were flipped at a baseball field, and extensive tree and power line damage occurred. 30 cars in a Target parking lot were damaged, with some totaled. An Office Depot sustained roof damage, and the Cordova Mall sustained damage to its skylights, allowing water to leak into the building. 86 buildings were damaged by the tornado and four people were injured.
EF0	Southern Starkville	Oktibbeha	MS	33.4106°N 88.8051°W	17:41–17:43	0.32 mi (0.51 km)	50 yd (46 m)	A brief tornado caused minor damage to a building at the Starkville Country Club. Two trees were also snapped.
EF0	E of Starkville	Oktibbeha	MS	33.4681°N 88.7277°W	18:02–18:03	0.36 mi (0.58 km)	25 yd (23 m)	A tornado snapped a few trees.
EF0	NW of Vernon	Lamar	AL	33.83°N 88.21°W	18:15	0.03 mi (0.048 km)	25 yd (23 m)	A brief tornado touchdown was photographed by local police. The tornado did not cause any damage.
EF1	ENE of Kellis Store to SW of Shuqualak	Kemper, Noxubee	MS	32.9153°N 88.6617°W	19:13–19:21	2.41 mi (3.88 km)	100 yd (91 m)	Damage along the path was limited to pine trees being knocked down.
EF0	NNE of Thorn Hill	Marion	AL	34.2013°N 87.659°W	19:42	0.06 mi (0.097 km)	50 yd (46 m)	A farmhouse was damaged, and tree and power line damage occurred.
EF1	S of Mount Hope	Lawrence	AL	34.3066°N 87.5012°W	20:05–20:10	0.16 mi (0.26 km)	100 yd (91 m)	A tornado moved through the Bankhead National Forest, damaging trees.
EF1	W of Tower to Black Lake	Cheboygan	MI	45.35°N 84.3927°W	21:25–21:43	10.21 mi (16.43 km)	215 yd (197 m)	A highly visible tornado was photographed and caught on video as it crossed Black Lake. A barn was destroyed and trees were downed.
EF2	WNW of Lachine to NW of Long Rapids	Alpena	MI	45.1033°N 83.8096°W	22:25–22:33	4.06 mi (6.53 km)	430 yd (390 m)	Three homes suffered roof and siding damage, and three barns were destroyed or heavily damaged. A garage and a shed were also destroyed, and there was substantial tree damage along the path.
EF1	NE of Owensboro	Daviess	KY	37.8365°N 87.0359°W	23:07–23:10	2 mi (3.2 km)	90 yd (82 m)	A few structures were damaged and numerous trees were downed along the path.
EF0	Louisville	Jefferson	KY	38.2581°N 85.7044°W	23:10–23:11	0.04 mi (0.064 km)	10 yd (9.1 m)	A tornado touched down at a Kroger store in the Crescent Hill neighborhood. Windows were blown out of the grocery store, a shopping cart corral was blown into a car, and a large power pole was blown down.
EF2	ENE of Thurston to WSW of Hawesville	Daviess, Hancock	KY	37.8111°N 86.9962°W	23:10–23:32	13.93 mi (22.42 km)	200 yd (180 m)	Major tree and structural damage occurred. A mobile home was destroyed and several barns were leveled before the tornado dissipated.
EF0	SW of Gatewood	Daviess	KY	37.8044°N 86.9024°W	23:15–23:16	0.2 mi (0.32 km)	20 yd (18 m)	Several trees were damaged by this brief tornado.
EF1	ESE of Cannelton to SSW of Gerald	Perry	IN	37.9147°N 86.7302°W	23:34–23:45	8.15 mi (13.12 km)	200 yd (180 m)	A tornado caused relatively minor damage along its path.
EF2	Crofton to WSW of Kalkaska	Kalkaska	MI	44.6671°N 85.23°W	23:35–23:42	4.45 mi (7.16 km)	430 yd (390 m)	1 death - Multiple homes were damaged along the path, some severely. A large metal warehouse building was damaged, and a nearby mobile home was destroyed, resulting in a fatality. Several hangars and small planes were damaged at the Kalkaska County Airport, and sheet metal from the hangars was deposited near the Kalkaska Middle School. Large trees were also uprooted and one other person was injured.
EF2	NE of Dixon to SE of Sebree	Webster	KY	37.5302°N 87.6871°W	00:09–00:25	10.19 mi (16.40 km)	300 yd (270 m)	Three homes were destroyed and 10 others were damaged. A youth rehabilitation center sustained major damage. One mobile home was obliterated and scattered across a field, injuring all four occupants. The metal frame of the mobile home was thrown 300 ft (91 m). Another injury occurred as a vehicle was picked up and thrown by the tornado, ejecting the occupant.
EF2	NW of Luzerne to N of Mio	Oscoda	MI	44.6405°N 84.2988°W	00:12–00:26	11.63 mi (18.72 km)	865 yd (791 m)	A large wedge tornado moved through densely forested areas. Tens of thousands of trees were snapped or uprooted, and many power lines were downed. About 16 structures were damaged, mostly outbuildings or cabins. Three of the cabins were completely destroyed.
EF0	NE of West Salem	Edwards	IL	38.5405°N 87.9938°W	00:15–00:16	0.1 mi (0.16 km)	20 yd (18 m)	A brief tornado remained over open country and caused no damage.
EF1	E of Creswell to NNE of Fryer	Caldwell, Hopkins	KY	37.27°N 87.9018°W	00:16–00:23	5.2 mi (8.4 km)	100 yd (91 m)	Trees were uprooted and snapped.
EF1	W of Otter Pond to ENE of Friendship	Caldwell, Christian	KY	37.03°N 87.8417°W	00:25–00:37	8.83 mi (14.21 km)	300 yd (270 m)	Seven homes sustained major damage, some of which had roofs torn off. Many trees were snapped and uprooted, and several small barns were destroyed.
EF2	W of Beech Grove to SW of Owensboro	McLean, Daviess	KY	37.62°N 87.4767°W	00:32–01:05	17.26 mi (27.78 km)	360 yd (330 m)	Near Beech Grove, numerous barns and outbuildings were destroyed, a house sustained major damage, and four other homes sustained minor damage. A pontoon boat was moved up to 20 ft (6.1 m) from where it originated, and a garage and several vehicles were destroyed. Near Owensboro, additional homes and outbuildings sustained major damage, with a few destroyed. Extensive tree and power line damage occurred along the path, and four people were injured when a mobile home was completely destroyed.
EF0	N of Ambia	Benton	IN	40.4945°N 87.52°W	00:35–00:36	0.4 mi (0.64 km)	20 yd (18 m)	A brief tornado touched down in an open field caused no damage.
EF2	NW of Macedonia	Caldwell	KY	37.1168°N 87.7161°W	00:40–00:42	1.4 mi (2.3 km)	300 yd (270 m)	A tornado flattened a swath of large trees in the Pennyrile State Forest. Three mobile homes were damaged, including one that was blown down a hill and smashed, injuring the occupant. A barn was destroyed as well.
EF1	ESE of Comins to NNW of Curran	Oscoda, Alcona	MI	44.7756°N 83.9028°W	00:42–00:44	3.22 mi (5.18 km)	150 yd (140 m)	Considerable tree damage occurred, outbuildings were damaged, and swirl marks were left in farm fields.
EF2	SW of St. Charles	Christian, Hopkins	KY	37.136°N 87.6252°W	00:48–00:51	1.86 mi (2.99 km)	300 yd (270 m)	Numerous trees were downed and three mobile homes were destroyed, one of which had its metal frame bent. Debris from the mobile homes was scattered hundreds of yards away. Barns were damaged, and a frame home sustained major roof, siding, and porch damage. One person was injured.
EF1	N of Canton	Trigg	KY	36.8361°N 87.95°W	00:56–01:00	3 mi (4.8 km)	75 yd (69 m)	Many large trees and tree limbs were downed, including some that damaged a dock, a garage, and a house. Further along the path, another garage had tin roofing peeled back, and a house had part of its roof blown off. Two cabins at Lake Barkley State Resort Park sustained roof damage. The state park was closed for most of the following day, mostly due to trees and power lines blocking access to the park.
EF1	N of Nortonville	Hopkins	KY	37.2°N 87.4791°W	00:58–01:00	2 mi (3.2 km)	100 yd (91 m)	A tornado caused damage to several buildings in the Nortonville area. Two masonry buildings had their wooden roofs blown off, a gas station canopy was damaged, and a tree fell onto a house. Trees were sheared off and uprooted.
EF2	NNW of Hubbard Lake	Alpena	MI	44.9383°N 83.6155°W	01:00–01:01	0.25 mi (0.40 km)	230 yd (210 m)	A house had much of its second story ripped off, and two barns and a mobile home were destroyed. Cows and chickens in the area were killed, and extensive tree damage occurred as well.
EF1	ESE of Murray to N of Hamlin	Trigg	KY	36.5757°N 88.1869°W	01:07–01:17	7.23 mi (11.64 km)	180 yd (160 m)	Hundreds of trees were snapped and uprooted. One home received major roof damage, primarily from falling trees.
EF3	Western Owensboro, KY	Daviess (KY), Spencer (IN)	KY, IN	37.77°N 87.1657°W	01:09–01:20	6.99 mi (11.25 km)	360 yd (330 m)	An intense tornado struck Owensboro for the second time since 2000. 150 homes were damaged in Owensboro, with several destroyed. Two historic churches sustained major damage, including one that had its steeple collapse through the roof into the sanctuary. A motel sustained major damage and had most of its roof torn off. Almost every building at Brescia University sustained damage, mostly to the roofs and windows. A delivery truck was overturned, and streets were littered with debris from collapsed roofs and warehouses. Several large brick tobacco warehouses were completely destroyed. Extensive tree and power line damage occurred as well. 8 people were injured.
EF1	W of Model	Stewart	TN	36.65°N 88.0401°W	01:18–01:19	0.67 mi (1.08 km)	500 yd (460 m)	Numerous trees were snapped and uprooted.
EF0	SW of Linton	Trigg	KY	36.6544°N 87.9319°W	01:23–01:24	1 mi (1.6 km)	50 yd (46 m)	Trees were uprooted in the Land Between the Lakes area.
EF1	SSE of Saint Marks to Kyana	Dubois	IN	38.2725°N 86.8058°W	01:27–01:30	1.94 mi (3.12 km)	125 yd (114 m)	About 100 trees were snapped or uprooted, a barn was damaged, and a door was ripped off of a house.
EF2	NE of Linton to SE of Cadiz	Trigg	KY	36.7168°N 87.8541°W	01:32–01:45	9.28 mi (14.93 km)	200 yd (180 m)	Two barns and a large garage were destroyed, with debris scattered up to 0.75 mi (1.21 km) away and projectiles embedded into the ground. Four power poles were snapped. Numerous trees were snapped and uprooted, some of which had metal debris stuck in them.
EF3	SSW of Vesta to E of Solon	Jefferson	IN	38.4716°N 85.5539°W	02:03–02:09	4.8 mi (7.7 km)	440 yd (400 m)	10 homes were damaged by this tornado, four heavily, one of which was swept away with only its basement left. The home that was swept away was bolted to its foundation, though it was determined that the severity of the destruction at that residence was the result of two nearby barns, a stable, and a silo being blown away and slammed into the house, as context was not indicative of a violent tornado. Four vehicles were heavily damaged or destroyed, and corn and soybean fields were scoured by the tornado.
EF3	SE of Inwood to Nappanee to W of New Paris	Marshall, Kosciusko, Elkhart	IN	41.2973°N 86.1698°W	02:05–02:29	20.33 mi (32.72 km)	880 yd (800 m)	An intense tornado tore through Nappanee. As the tornado touched down, numerous trees were sheared off and uprooted, grain silos were damaged, and power poles were broken in that area. Homes sustained up to high-end EF1 damage, mobile homes were flipped, a garage was reduced to a bare slab, and a trampoline and a highway sign were mangled. Down the path, the tornado strengthened and some areas of EF2 damage were noted. Several Amish homes and barns sustained major damage in this area, and one frail home lost its roof and exterior walls. The tornado then entered Nappanee as a high-end EF2, partially destroying a church and tearing the roofs and second stories from several homes. Many new RVs and mobile homes were destroyed at a distribution plant, and a nearby factory was damaged. The tornado reached high-end EF3 strength in the eastern part of town, where another RV plant was flattened, a metal-frame warehouse building was heavily damaged, and a gas station was destroyed. A Taco Bell and a Dairy Queen sustained major damage in this area, along with several homes in a nearby subdivision, one of which only had interior walls left. The tornado then exited town and caused EF1 to EF2 damage to several homes and farms before dissipating. A total of 591 buildings (including at least 368 homes and 81 businesses) were damaged, of which at least 98 were destroyed across the three counties. A few minor injuries occurred.
EF2	Rosetta	Breckinridge	KY	37.7862°N 86.2875°W	02:26–02:33	3.95 mi (6.36 km)	300 yd (270 m)	A church was destroyed and a nearby house had much of its roof torn off. Two large outbuildings were destroyed and a trailer was wrapped around a tree. A pickup truck was thrown 75 ft (23 m) and a 4,500 lb (2,000 kg) tractor was shifted 7 ft (2.1 m) from where it sat. Numerous trees along the path were snapped and uprooted.
EF2	W of Vantown to southern Williamston to SSE of Perry	Ingham, Shiawassee	MI	42.61°N 84.3°W	02:28–02:56	19 mi (31 km)	300 yd (270 m)	2 deaths - A tornado struck the south side of Williamston, where approximately 100 homes were damaged. Just outside town, two people were killed when a modular home was thrown into a pond. Near Perry, four barns and three houses received damage. One house had windows blown out, a farmhouse had a section of roof taken off, and a modular home had its entire roof ripped off. One other person was injured.
EF1	NNW of Flaherty to SW of Muldraugh	Meade	KY	37.8434°N 86.077°W	02:50–02:55	4.11 mi (6.61 km)	300 yd (270 m)	An inn sustained roof damage, and a service station canopy was knocked over. The tornado also uprooted large trees along the damage path.
EF1	Hubers	Bullitt	KY	38.0305°N 85.6938°W	03:20–03:26	1.64 mi (2.64 km)	200 yd (180 m)	Two outbuildings were damaged and numerous trees were downed at the beginning of the path. A garage was destroyed and several homes sustained minor damage further along the path.

=== October 19 event ===
List of confirmed tornadoes –Friday, October 19, 2007
EF#	Location	County / Parish	State	Start Coord.	Time (UTC)	Path length	Max width	Summary
EF0	Thetford Center	Genesee	MI	43.18°N 83.62°W	05:06–05:09	2.5 mi (4.0 km)	50 yd (46 m)	Trees were snapped and uprooted, a home sustained shingle damage, and a barn lost part of its metal roof.
EF1	Millington	Tuscola	MI	43.2647°N 83.5511°W	05:16–05:18	2 mi (3.2 km)	30 yd (27 m)	25 ft (7.6 m) and buried under about 4 ft (1.2 m) of beams, rafters, and other debris. A home near the modular home was damaged by flying debris, and a third home lost part of its roof.
EF0	Bradfordsville	Marion	KY	37.4915°N 85.1601°W	05:36–05:38	0.77 mi (1.24 km)	20 yd (18 m)	One mobile home was rolled over and several houses lost shingles. Extensive tree and power pole damage occurred in town, and outbuildings were destroyed.
EF1	W of Deford	Tuscola	MI	43.52°N 83.2419°W	05:45–05:48	3 mi (4.8 km)	100 yd (91 m)	Trees were snapped and uprooted, a home sustained shingle damage, and a barn lost part of its metal roof.
EF1	W of Port Hope	Huron	MI	43.93°N 82.80003°W	06:26–06:27	1 mi (1.6 km)	100 yd (91 m)	Farm machinery was lifted and displaced, and a farm shed was moved about 120 ft (37 m) off of its foundation. Also, the walls of a large barn were lifted 6 ft (1.8 m) to 8 ft (2.4 m) from the foundation.

== Significant tornadoes ==
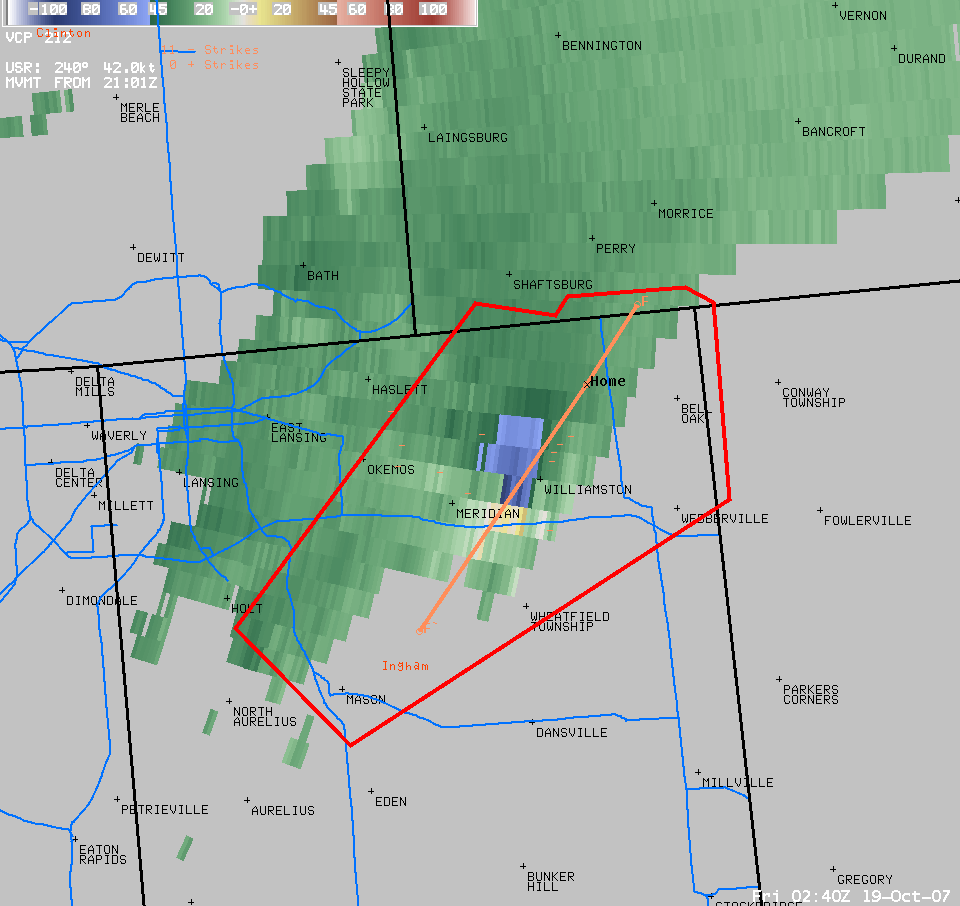
Graphic showing the track of the Ingham County, Michigan, tornado

The first severe thunderstorms developed during the early morning of October 17 across much of northern and eastern Texas and parts of Oklahoma and Kansas with only one reported tornado in east Texas. Several severe thunderstorms then later developed across eastern Oklahoma, Arkansas, Louisiana, western Mississippi, eastern Kansas, Missouri and parts of Nebraska, Iowa, Kentucky, Illinois and Tennessee. Twelve additional tornadoes were reported in Missouri and Louisiana during the late afternoon and early evening with damage reported in Lawrence and Greene counties in Missouri. One of the tornadoes located near Verona destroyed several barns and homes but did not cause any injuries and was later confirmed as an EF2. The storms persisted throughout the night and an additional tornado killed 2 people inside a mobile home in Greene County, Missouri, near Paris.

On October 18, several thunderstorms already developed during the morning hours and continued to intensify during the afternoon. Just after 11:00 am EDT, one tornado in downtown Pensacola, Florida, caused some extensive damage to the roof of a Baptist church as well as portions of Cordova Mall, but there were no reported injuries at the church and daycare center. During the early evenings severe weather affected the Louisville, Kentucky Metro area in which tree damage and power outages were reported throughout the area and a possible tornado at around 7:00 pm EDT near the Crescent Hill area which was later confirmed as a brief EF0. Still in the region, one tree fell over a passing car but the motorist escaped injuries although he was trapped for several minutes inside. The Louisville power authority the LG&E reported as much as 2,500 homes without power mostly in St. Matthews and Crescent Hill areas. More storms rolled through much of the Ohio and Tennessee Valleys during the second half of the evening and overnight with more storms in Michigan.

Paducah, Kentucky radar loop showing the supercells in western Kentucky between 7:00 PM CDT and 7:45 PM CDT

Areas the hardest hit were along and near the Ohio River in western Kentucky as well as central and northern Indiana in Nappanee where injuries were reported as well as significant damage, and in Central Michigan. Three people were killed overall on October 18: one in Kalkaska County, Michigan and two in Locke Township, near Williamston, Michigan. In addition to the tornadoes, storm straight-line damaging winds measured up to 80 mph (130 km/h) were recorded across several of the regions hit by the severe weather, causing extensive tree and power line downings with isolated reports of structural damage.

In Michigan, a tornado in Tuscola near Flint threw a one-year-old baby 40 feet (12 m) away from its location along with the crib and was later found amongst a pile of rubble under a mattress. His parents told reporters that the mattress saved the toddler's life and he suffered few to no injuries. According to the National Weather Service in Detroit, tornadoes this late in the year in Michigan are rare. The last significant October tornado event was on October 24, 2001, when three tornadoes hit southeastern Lower Michigan, out of a total of nine in the state that day. Including the 2001 tornadoes, only seven October tornadoes had been recorded in the NWS Detroit county warning area prior to the 2007 outbreak. By comparison, NWS Detroit had confirmed five tornadoes in its coverage area from this outbreak. It was also the largest October outbreak over western Kentucky and southern Indiana as 15 tornadoes were confirmed on October 18. Previous to this outbreak, only 19 tornadoes had been recorded in that same region during the history of October prior to this event. The Owensboro tornado, which was rated an EF3 was also the strongest ever in that month over the same region since records were kept in 1950 although an unofficial F3 took place in Posey County, Indiana on October 16, 1928.

== Non-tornadic events ==
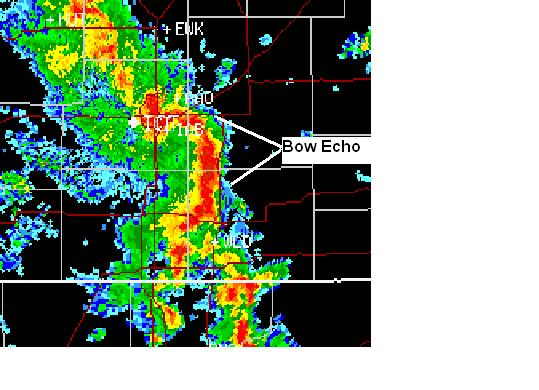
Radar shot of a bow echo crossing the Wichita area at 6:00 PM CDT on October 17, 2007.

In addition to the tornadoes, widespread straight-line wind damage took place across much of the affected region, particularly on the night of October 17 as a result of a derecho that moved across the southern Great Plains into the Ozarks. Winds were reported as high as 100 mph (160 km/h) as a result of the bow echo that moved across the region. Tulsa was hard hit, with at least 55 people injured (one critically) due to wind damage at the Oktoberfest event. Many mobile homes were destroyed, and widespread power outages were reported in the region including in Rogers County near Oologah where five people were injured.

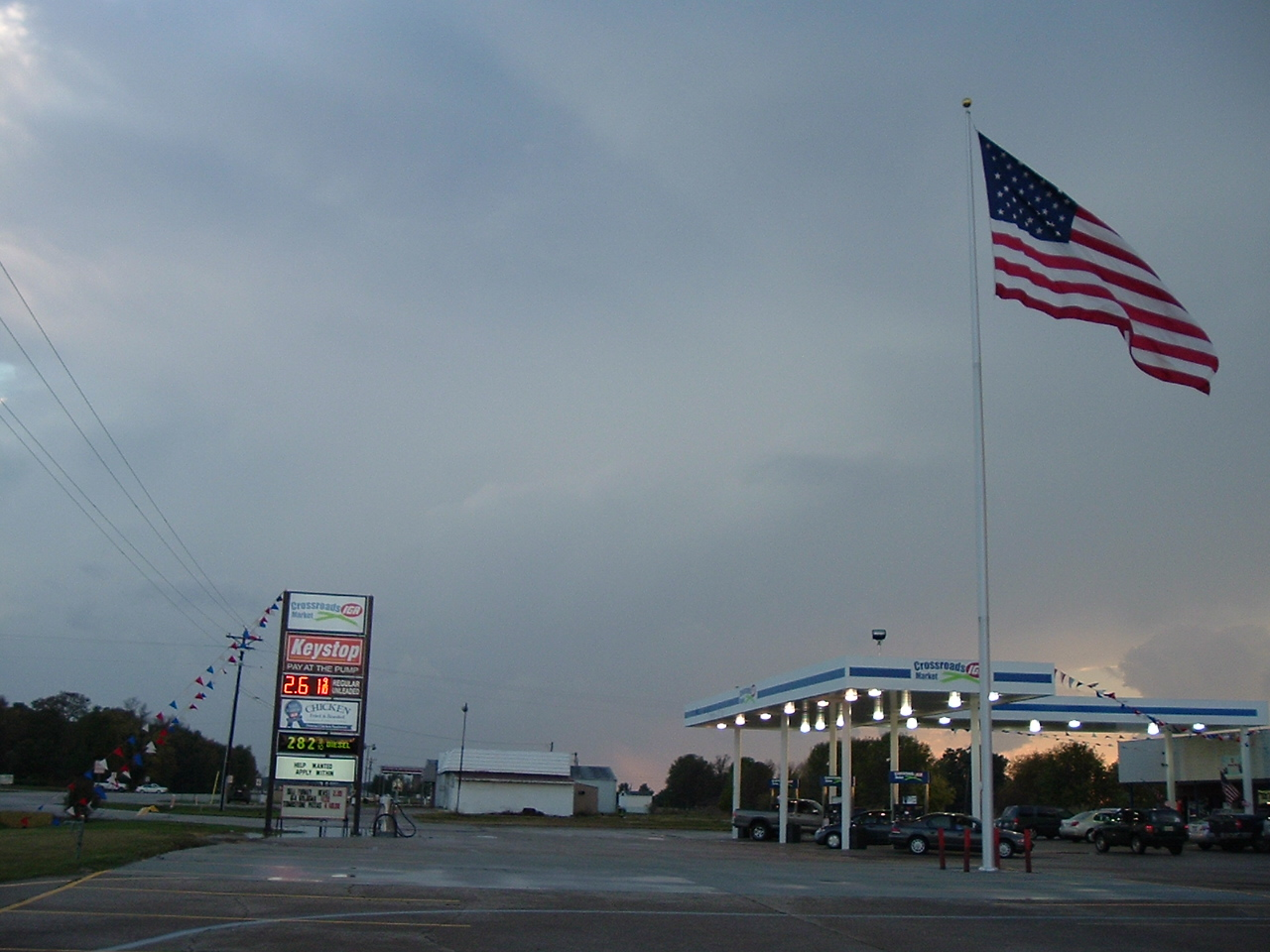
A thunderstorm with a confirmed tornado approaching Owensboro, Kentucky

In Kansas, a bow echo caused some localized significant damage in and around the Wichita Metropolitan Area with the most significant damage at the International Cold Storage located in the Andover area where the peak winds were measured. Overall, over 400 wind reports in the US alone, were reported on both October 17 and 18 across the Midwest, Gulf Coast and Great Lakes with several reports of damage but there were no direct non-tornadic fatalities. In Chicago, an eleven-year-old boy was struck and injured by lightning while another person was injured by broken glass when high winds broke windows of a lobby hall of a condominium.

In addition, the Gulf Coast region, particularly the Florida Panhandle, received torrential rain due to continuous thunderstorms ahead of the cold front. Rainfall amounts over 12 inches (300 mm) were common (with amounts as high as 22 inches (560 mm) were reported in Gulf Breeze, Florida), although only minor flooding was reported including roads and some houses flooded.

== See also ==
- List of North American tornadoes and tornado outbreaks
- Tornadoes of 2007
