= Wilburn (disambiguation) =

Wilburn may refer to:

== Places ==
- Wilburn, a community in Cullman County, Alabama
- Wilburn, Arkansas, a CDP in Cleburne County

== People ==
=== Surname ===
- Barry Wilburn (1963–2026), American footballer
- Cora Wilburn (1824–1906), American novelist
- Jerry Wilburn (1940–2026), American politician
- Jimmy Wilburn (1908–1984), American racing driver
- J. R. Wilburn (born 1943), American football player
- Ken Wilburn (1944–2016), American basketball player
- Leigh Wilburn, American lawyer and politician
- Leila Ross Wilburn (1885–1967), American architect
- Mary Wilburn (1932–2021), American lawyer
- Newton Jasper Wilburn (1874–1927), American National Guard officer
- Robert Wilburn, American university director
- Ross Wilburn (born 1964/1965), American politician
- Victoria Wilburn (born 1981/1982), American politician

=== Given name ===
- Wilburn Cartwright (1892–1979), American politician
- Wilburn Ferguson (1905–1998), American missionary etc.
- Wilburn Hollis (1940–2024), American football player
- Wilburn Hooker (1913–1989), American politician
- Wilburn Hill King (1839–1910), American colonel
- Wilburn K. Ross (1922–2017), American soldier
- Wilburn Tucker (1920–1980), American football and baseball player and coach

== Other ==
- G.T. Wilburn Grist Mill, in Leoma, Tennessee
- The Wilburn Brothers, a country music duo
- Wilburn Boat Co. v. Fireman's Fund Insurance Co.
