= Vigilantism in the United States =

Vigilantism in the United States is defined as acts which violate societal limits which are intended to defend and protect citizens from some form of attack or some form of harm.

In the United States, a citizen's arrest is a procedure rooted in common law and protected by the Constitution, allowing civilians to detain individuals they have witnessed or reasonably suspect of committing a crime.

The exact circumstances under which this type of arrest, also known as a detention, can be made varies widely from state to state.

== History ==
=== The Regulator movement in colonial South Carolina ===
When the British set up the American colonies, they established law enforcement along British lines. Population growth was slow and the law enforcement system worked. One important exception came in North Carolina, where rapid migration to the frontier established a new western region without a strong local government. There emerged the only major vigilante movement in colonial America. The term "vigilante" was not yet in use, and the acitivists called themselves "regulators." The poor farmers bitterly resented the overpaid corrupt local officials appointed by a distant elite, By 1768 the decentralized movement was highly popular in the backcountry. When two local leaders were arrested, 700 Regulators turned out to free them. In 1771 the governor led a force of a thousand men into the heart of the uprising, but Regulators led twice that number into the Battle of Alamance. The insurgents lacked leadership and strategy. They were quickly routed with nine Regulators dead. Seven of the leaders were executed and others fled the state. When the American Revolution broke out four years later, North Carolina's elite supported the Patriot cause, while the Regulator districts were much more likely to be neutral or pro-British.

=== San Francisco 1850s ===
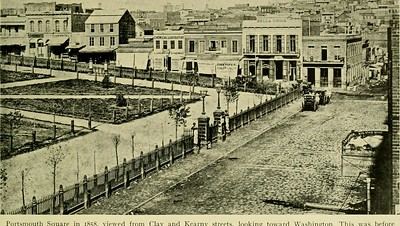
Portsmouth Square in 1858, San Francisco Committee of Vigilance site of origin

The San Francisco Committee of Vigilance was a vigilante group formed in 1851 and reorganized in 1856 in response to rampant crime and corruption in San Francisco, California. The need for extralegal intervention was apparent with the explosive population growth following the discovery of gold in 1848. The small town of about 900 individuals grew to a booming city of over 20,000 very rapidly. This growth in population overwhelmed the small law enforcement system. The boss-controlled Democratic Party machine was dominant, and used Irish Catholic men to manipulate the precinct vote totals. The opposition Know Nothing movement represented the Protestant businessmen, and they formed the vigilance movement to counter the Democratic machine. The vigilantes hanged eight people and forced several elected officials to resign. The Committee of Vigilance formally relinquished power after three months, but its retired leaders ran the new Republican Party and controlled local politics for the next decade.

=== The Night Riders ===
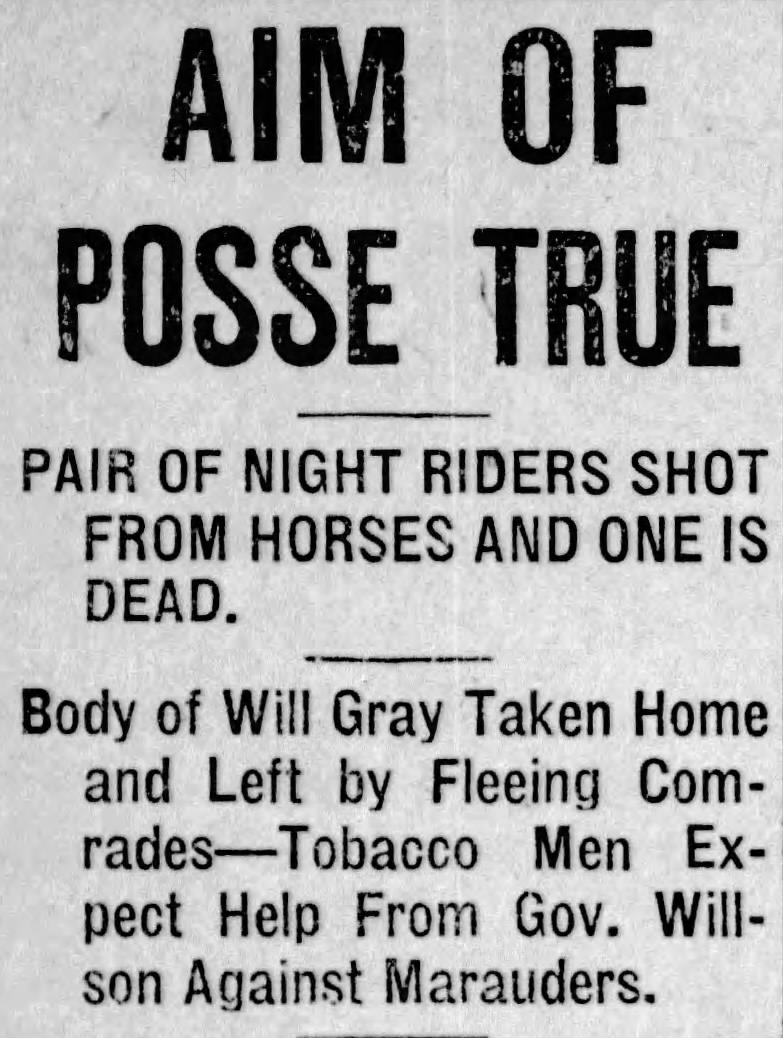
Headline in the Lexington Herald-Leader of December 10, 1907

The Night Riders was the militant, terrorist faction of tobacco farmers during a popular resistance to the monopolistic practices of the American Tobacco Company (ATC) of James B. Duke. On September 24, 1904, the tobacco planters of western Kentucky and the neighboring counties of West Tennessee formed the Dark Fired Tobacco District, or Black Patch District Planters' Protective Association of Kentucky and Tennessee (called "the Association" or PPA). It urged farmers to boycott the ATC and refuse to sell at the ruinously low prices being offered in a quasi-monopoly market.

Groups of a more militant faction of farmers, trained and led by Dr. David A. Amoss of Caldwell County, Kentucky, resorted to terrorism—most notably, the lynching of the Walker family and the lynching of Captain Quentin Rankin and the kidnapping of Colonel R. Z. Taylor. Becoming known as the Night Riders, due to their night-time activities, they also targeted and destroyed the tobacco warehouses of the ATC. Their largest raid of this type was their occupation and attack on areas of Hopkinsville, Kentucky, in 1907.

=== Mexican border ===
- Formed in 2000, Ranch Rescue was an organization in the southwest United States. Ranchers called upon Ranch Rescue to remove illegal immigrants and squatters from their property. Its largest chapter in Arizona was later disbanded in 2003, and the organization's website went down in 2007.
- The Minuteman Project has been described as vigilantes dedicated to expelling people who cross the US-Mexico border illegally.
- Arizona Border Recon is a Arizona-based paramilitary group that patrols the US-Mexico border.

=== Other episodes ===
- Lynching was the most common form of vigilantism in the United States with several thousand episodes during the late 19th and early 20th centuries. The great majority of victims were African American men in the South.
- In the 1750s, Gideon Gibson Jr. became a significant landowner in South Carolina. Due to various tax acts, some shareholders abandoned their lands along the Santee River, resorting to raiding others' farms for survival. With no help from the distant Royal Governor, the local farmers formed vigilante groups to capture and publicly punish these raiders, marking the rise of vigilantism in the area.
- The San Luis Obispo Vigilance Committee in San Luis Obispo, California, was known to have hanged six Californios, as well as engage in battles around the area.
- During racial unrest in Newark, New Jersey, in the late 1960s, local activist Anthony Imperiale, later a city councilman and state legislator, founded a neighborhood safety patrol that critics claimed was a vigilante group.
- Operating since 2002, perverted-justice.com opponents have accused the website of being modern-day cyber vigilantes.
- In a number of U.S. cities, individuals have created real-life superhero personas, donning masks and costumes to patrol their neighborhoods, sometimes maintaining an uneasy relationship with local police departments who believe what they are doing could be dangerous to the costumed crusaders themselves, or could devolve into vigilantism.
- In October 2011 in the United States, a vigilante operating in Seattle, named Phoenix Jones was arrested and forced to reveal his true identity, after a confrontation with two groups who were fighting.
- On October 9, 2013, the Federal Bureau of Investigation apprehended members of the New York divorce coercion gang, a rabbinical group that administered extrajudicial beatings and torture to Jewish husbands.
- On December 4, 2024, Brian Robert Thompson, the CEO of the American health insurance company UnitedHealthcare, was shot and killed by 26-year-old Luigi Mangione outside the New York Hilton Midtown in Manhattan, New York City, where Thompson was heading to attend an investors' meeting. For further information, see Killing of Brian Thompson.

== See also ==
- Citizen detective
- Extrajudicial punishment
- Frontier justice
- Feud
- List of anti-sex offender attacks in the United States
- List of feuds in the United States
- Lynching in the United States
- Mobbing, the coming together of people for the purpose of bullying an individual
- Neighborhood watch
- Posse comitatus, the "citizen enforcer" band is either capable of acting lawfully as an exceptional agent of justice; or it is in danger of deteriorating into lawlessness which is motivated by populist malice
- Presumption of guilt
- Public humiliation
- Regulator Movement in South Carolina a successful effort in early 1760s
- Scam baiting, a form of vigilantism against scams
- Vigilante film, films based on revenge theme
- Violent non-state actor
- Whistleblower
- Whitecapping
- Tarring and feathering
