= Trial of David Amoss =

1910 trial in Kentucky

David Amoss was a leader of the Night Riders, a vigilante group of Western Kentucky and Middle Tennessee farmers that was an offshoot of the Planters' Protective Association (PPA). The Night Riders were involved in a series of raids that made up the Black Patch Tobacco Wars across Kentucky and Tennessee from 1904 to 1909, mainly destroying large tobacco companies' warehouses because the farmers believed their prices were unfair. In 1910, he was put on trial for his leadership role in the Hopkinsville, Kentucky, raid of 1907.

== Background ==
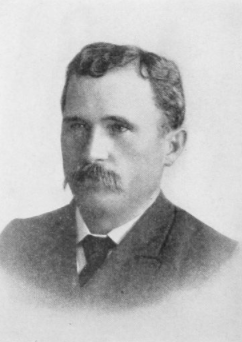
David Alfred Amoss (1857–1915)

As early as 1889, David Amoss began to get involved in violent incidents in Western Kentucky, taking part in the "violent enforcement of morality." As Dr. Amoss began attending Association meetings in the 1900s, he eventually began holding secretive meetings with PPA members who wanted to act violently on the organization's behalf. The Night Riders thrived on secrecy, securing everyone's loyalty by taking blood oaths.

Dr. Amoss was identified as the leader of the 1907 Hopkinsville raid in 1908. At the end of the year in 1908, tobacco prices stabilized across the country, causing an end to the Night Riders' violent raids. There was a growing dissension among political figures between those militia men who enforced law and order, and those who supported the Night Riders' actions.

== Timeline ==
=== Before the trial ===
In addition to the trial of Dr. Amoss, there were numerous other trials related to the Hopkinsville raid. In 1908, many trials occurred in which witnesses identified Night Riders who participated in the raid. However, all of these cases ended in the Night Riders' acquittal or in the cases being dismissed. As a result, local townspeople started their own organization, the Law and Order League, which provided local protection against more raids.

In November 1909, John T. Hanberry was elected as a Kentucky circuit judge. He defeated Thomas P. Cook (a rumored Night Rider sympathizer) in the primary and a law-and-order candidate in the general election for the position. Judge Hanberry presided over the Amoss trial when he began his term in late February 1910.

During the month of March 1910, Milton Oliver, a former Night Rider, claimed that David Amoss was one of the seven leaders of the Hopkinsville raid. Oliver was subsequently threatened by other Night Riders who claimed that other residents should avoid interacting with him at all costs.

On May 25, 1910, Milton Oliver was shot in the left hip while standing in his front yard, causing the Hopkinsville's Lieutenant Colonel to call in the Kentucky State Guards to keep watch over Oliver's farm and protect the surrounding neighborhood. The Kentucky guard's presence angered local Lyon County residents.

In the middle of June, Dr. Amoss was indicted on "violation of the ... Ku Klux Law," which stated that no group of people could "'go forth armed or disguised for the purpose of intimidating or alarming.'" He was tried for his leadership role in the Hopkinsville raid in 1907. However, the trial was delayed until March 1911, so that Oliver could fully recover from his injuries.

==== Axiom Cooper's death and trial ====
On July 30, 1910, Axiom Cooper was shot by the Night Riders' Roy Merrick and Vilas Mitchell while attending Tom Litchfield's barbecue. Cooper suffered several gunshot wounds in "his chest, back, wrist, and groin" and died the next day. Eight men were tried for Cooper's murder (including Merrick and Mitchell) in two separate cases, with four men in each. Col. E. B. Bassett claimed that the juries were unfair because the jury members were mostly local outlaws and criminals, who would be in favor of acquittal. These same sentiments were expressed by Commonwealth Attorney Denny P. Smith, who "hoped for ... a hung jury so he could request the judge to call in a jury from another county." All eight men were acquitted, even after "the judge summoned a jury from Crittenden County."

=== Trial of David Amoss ===
After the Axiom Cooper murder trials ended, Commonwealth Attorney Denny P. Smith was joined by three other attorneys "hired by the Law-and-Order League," hoping to convict Dr. Amoss. However, like in the Axiom Cooper trial, the jury selection was hotly contested as "Col. E. B. Bassett ... informed Governor Wilson that the jury was composed of former outlaws and Night Riders." Col. Bassett had a right to be suspicious as he was the "commander of the local company of the Kentucky State Guards" that tracked down Dr. Amoss and the rest of the Night Riders in the aftermath of the 1907 Hopkinsville raid.

The trial lasted from March 8 to March 16, 1911. Due to the jury selection, the result of the trial was never in doubt. Because of that, the trial turned into a "struggle for honor" among Night Rider members. There was contentious questioning among the defense and former Night Riders regarding the secrecy of their organization and their blood oath. Speaking out against the Night Riders carried a severe risk that could involve "disappearance and death," like the threats Milton Oliver faced after his 1910 testimony. Dr. Amoss claimed he had an alibi during the 1907 Hopkinsville raid, claiming that he was making a house call to examine William H. "White's sick wife that night." The prosecution's attempts to disprove Dr. Amoss's alibi were unsuccessful, as the Whites' "son-in-law, Wylie Jones ... avoided answering the subpoena" and other testimony did not "dispute Dr. Amoss's alibi." A couple of days later, after around forty minutes of deliberation by the jury, Dr. Amoss was declared not guilty.

== Aftermath ==
=== Community reaction ===
The non-guilty verdict did not surprise anyone in the community. However, historian Christopher Waldrep wrote that "prosecutors revealed the inner workings of the Night Riders ... destroying the aura of mystery that had surrounded" Amoss and the other Night Riders. Even though Dr. Amoss was acquitted, "the power of the Night Riders" had been diminished. William H. White, the man who lied to the jury about Dr. Amoss' alibi, was scorned by the community after the trial. An African-American resident named Clyde Quisenberry spoke about White's role as the church deacon, saying that "... all the white people thought he was an idol god." White's testimony drove him out of town to nearby Princeton, as Suzanne Marshall writes that "the whites of Cobb ... could not condone a lie by a leader in the church, even when the lie worked for their benefit."
