= Needmore, Kentucky =

Needmore, Kentucky may refer to the following unincorporated communities:

- Needmore, Ballard County, Kentucky
- Needmore, Boyle County, Kentucky
- Needmore, Caldwell County, Kentucky
- Needmore, Owen County, Kentucky
- Frances, Kentucky, also called Needmore
