= Claxton, Kentucky =

Unincorporated community in Kentucky, United States

Coordinates: 37°06′15″N 87°45′58″W

Claxton is an unincorporated community located in Caldwell County, Kentucky, United States.
