= Scottsburg, Kentucky =

Unincorporated community in Kentucky, United States

Scottsburg
- Unincorporated community
- Location within the state of Kentucky Scottsburg (the United States)
- Coordinates: 37°04′43″N 87°49′17″W
- Country: United States
- State: Kentucky
- County: Caldwell
- Elevation: 525 ft (160 m)
- Time zone: UTC−6 (CST)
  - Summer (DST): UTC−5 (CDT)
- ZIP codes: 42445
- GNIS feature ID: 509022

Scottsburg is a rural unincorporated community in southern Caldwell County, Kentucky, United States.

A post office named Scottsburg operated from 1872 to 1917.
