= Regulator Movement in South Carolina =

The Regulator Movement in South Carolina was a successful effort to control crime and obtain more government services. It was launched by local leaders in the newly settled areas of western South Carolina in the late 1760s. The local elite organized and petitioned, and also worked to suppress crime and operate some missing government functions such as courts. Back in far-off Charleston the royal governor and the elected assembly agreed as to the wisdom of the demands and in 1769 enacted the appropriate legislation. The regulators then disbanded Organizations of citizens were formed to regulate governmental affairs and eventually operated the courts in some districts. At about the same time a movement in newly settled areas of western North Carolina also used the name "regulator." The two movements were not in contact, The regulators in North Carolina mobilized an army to fight the colonial militia but they were decisively defeated at the Battle of Alamance in 1771.

== History ==
In the 1760s the South Carolina colony had a group of men calling themselves "regulators" and demanding reform. They were landowning farmers who had grievances against officialdom. Their main problems stemmed not from corruption, but in a high crime rate and weak law enforcement. They wanted more representation and government-provided services such as courts and churches. They were alarnmed by organized gangs of criminals and were highly suspicious of "hunters" (who were seen as thieves). The South Carolina regulation helped catalyze the Revolutionary War, as the residents found the distant authority of London to be too slow in responding to their demands.

The Regulators of South Carolina were formed during the mid-1760s and were active mainly between 1767 and 1769. During the previous decades, the population of the frontier had boomed, thanks to the planning of Governor Robert Johnson. He supported sending yeomen out to the frontier en masse to provide a buffer for the coastal cities from Cherokee attacks. The slave population grew 19% as planters began to develop larger properties for agriculture. (However, the slave population of the frontier accounted only for 8% of the total population of the colony.)

During this time, the inland settlers on the South Carolina frontier suffered more from violent crimes, including organized bandit raids. The disruption of the Cherokee war of 1760-1761 left many settlers without homes, and native raids sometimes resulted in abandonment of settler children. To sustain their families, the men went out hunting. In the colonial period on the western frontier, this was not seen as an honorable profession, and hunters were labeled as vagrants, bandits, and outlaws, and blamed for stealing livestock. Their method of "fire hunting" at night used fire to blind deer, and sometimes they mistook farmers' livestock for wild game. They left unused animal corpses, which drew wolves and scavengers closer to populated areas. Hunting also pushed well into the boundary of the local natives, the Creek Indians, exacerbating their already tense relationship with colonists. The bandits gathered until they numbered about 200. Eventually they were bold enough to attack magistrates. They dragged James Mayson, a regulator, from his home in the night. Originally made up of the hunting groups, the bandits also accepted free mulattos and blacks, fugitive slaves, and any outlaw available. Some members of the bandit network were well-established farmers.

The South Carolina regulators were not rebels, but a vigilante force of propertied elite men. They co-operated with their colonial government. It was a much smaller organization than the mass movement in North Carolina. There were 100 known regulators, of whom 32 became justices of the peace, and 21 were militia leaders. Thirty-one owned slaves, and 14 owned 10 or more. Their primary aim was to protect themselves and their assets from bandits; their secondary purpose was to get courts, churches and schools established in their quickly growing communities. The only court in the colony was in far-off Charleston, through which all legal documentation had to go. The inland settlers had the sympathy of the coastal elite, but the circuit court act, which would establish the jails, courts, sheriffs and 14 judicial districts, was held up by a dispute with the Parliament of Great Britain concerning the tenure of judges.

The South Carolina regulation movement was a great success. Their manifesto, written by Anglican missionary Rev. Charles Woodmason argued their case. Eventually the colonial legislature passed a series of acts that met the needs of the propertied frontiersman. These included vagrancy acts, which restricted the hunters, forbidding them to trespass on Native lands.

Coupled with the 1769 ordinance for the preservation of deer, which forbade fire hunting, the new law resulted in many hunters being whipped and banished from the area. In 1768, the Charleston grand jury began urging the creation of new schools in the back country, as per regulator request. In 1769 the circuit court act was passed, making way for the new courthouses and jails, as well as setting up four new judicial districts. The cooperation between frontier and coastal colonists was so effective that by 1771, Governor Charles Montague had issued a full pardon for any actions taken by the regulators in his state.

== See also ==
- Vigilantism in the United States of America
- Regulator Movement in North Carolina, a similar uprising against colonial officials in North Carolina in the late 1760s
