= Farmersville, Kentucky =

Unincorporated community in Kentucky, United States

Farmersville
- Unincorporated community
- Location within the state of Kentucky Farmersville (the United States)
- Coordinates: 37°12′09″N 87°54′25″W
- Country: United States
- State: Kentucky
- County: Caldwell
- Elevation: 348 ft (106 m)
- Time zone: UTC−6 (CST)
  - Summer (DST): UTC−5 (CDT)
- ZIP codes: 42445
- GNIS feature ID: 491995

Farmersville is a rural unincorporated community in central Caldwell County, Kentucky, United States.
