= McGowan, Kentucky =

Unincorporated community in Kentucky, United States

McGowan
- Unincorporated community
- Location within the state of Kentucky McGowan (the United States)
- Coordinates: 37°03′28″N 87°50′40″W
- Country: United States
- State: Kentucky
- County: Caldwell
- Elevation: 515 ft (157 m)
- Time zone: UTC−6 (CST)
  - Summer (DST): UTC−5 (CDT)
- ZIP codes: 42445
- GNIS feature ID: 508579

McGowan is a rural unincorporated community in southern Caldwell County, Kentucky, United States.

A post office named McGowan operated from 1890 to 1912.
