= Crowtown, Kentucky =

Unincorporated community in Kentucky, United States

Crowtown
- Unincorporated community
- Location within the state of Kentucky Crowtown (the United States)
- Coordinates: 37°7′40″N 87°53′37″W
- Country: United States
- State: Kentucky
- County: Caldwell
- Elevation: 561 ft (171 m)
- Time zone: UTC-6 (Central (CST))
  - Summer (DST): UTC-5 (CST)
- GNIS feature ID: 490417

Crowtown is an unincorporated community in Caldwell County, Kentucky, United States.

The community was named for the family of Crow settlers.
