= Cedar Bluff, Kentucky =

Unincorporated community in Kentucky, United States

Cedar Bluff
- Unincorporated community
- Location within the state of Kentucky Cedar Bluff (the United States)
- Coordinates: 37°05′18″N 87°50′41″W
- Country: United States
- State: Kentucky
- County: Caldwell
- Elevation: 348 ft (106 m)
- Time zone: UTC−6 (CST)
  - Summer (DST): UTC−5 (CDT)
- ZIP codes: 42445
- GNIS feature ID: 507670

Cedar Bluff is a rural unincorporated community in central Caldwell County, Kentucky, United States.
