= Dulaney, Kentucky =

Unincorporated community in Kentucky, United States

Dulaney
- Unincorporated community
- Location within the state of Kentucky Dulaney (the United States)
- Coordinates: 37°5′49″N 87°58′50″W
- Country: United States
- State: Kentucky
- County: Caldwell
- Elevation: 538 ft (164 m)
- Time zone: UTC-6 (Central (CST))
  - Summer (DST): UTC-5 (CST)
- GNIS feature ID: 507886

Dulaney is a rural unincorporated community in western Caldwell County, Kentucky, United States.

A post office was established in the community in 1872, and it was probably named for Henry F. Delany, a prominent local lawyer.
