= Night Ride =

Night Ride or Nightride may refer to:

== Music ==
- Nightride (album), a 2016 album by Tinashe
- "Nightride", a song by Status Quo from On the Level, 1975
- "Nightride (The Ballad of the Black Patch Riders)", by Legendary Shack Shakers from AgriDustrial
- Nightride, a 1981 album by Cliff Bennett produced by Ian Gillan

== Other uses ==
- Night Ride (1930 film), an American crime film directed by John S. Robertson
- Night Ride (1937 film), a British drama film directed by John Paddy Carstairs
- Night Ride (2020 film), a Norwegian short film directed by Eirik Tveiten
- Nightride (film), a crime thriller film
- Night Ride (BBC Radio 2) from 1967–1974 and Radio 2's overnight programme from 1984–1995
- NightRide (bus service), Sydney night bus network
- Nightride, an off-Broadway production with Lester Rawlins

== See also ==
- Night Rider (disambiguation)
