= Quinn, Kentucky =

Unincorporated community in Kentucky, United States

Quinn
- Unincorporated community
- Location within the state of Kentucky Quinn (the United States)
- Coordinates: 37°17′36″N 87°5′11″W
- Country: United States
- State: Kentucky
- County: Caldwell
- Elevation: 518 ft (158 m)
- Time zone: UTC-6 (Central (CST))
  - Summer (DST): UTC-5 (CST)
- GNIS feature ID: 508890

Quinn is an unincorporated community in Caldwell County, Kentucky, United States.
