= Lewistown, Kentucky =

Unincorporated community in Kentucky, United States

Lewistown
- Unincorporated community
- Location within the state of Kentucky Lewistown (the United States)
- Coordinates: 37°8′34″N 87°48′2″W
- Country: United States
- State: Kentucky
- County: Caldwell
- Elevation: 469 ft (143 m)
- Time zone: UTC-6 (Central (CST))
  - Summer (DST): UTC-5 (CST)
- GNIS feature ID: 508452

Lewistown is an unincorporated community in Caldwell County, Kentucky, United States.
