= Newton Jasper Wilburn =

Kentucky National Guard (1874–1927)

Captain Newton Jasper Wilburn (November 9, 1874 – January 31, 1927) was a Kentucky National Guard officer who played a crucial part in ending the Black Patch Tobacco Wars, the most sustained and violent civil uprising in America since the Civil War.

== Early life ==
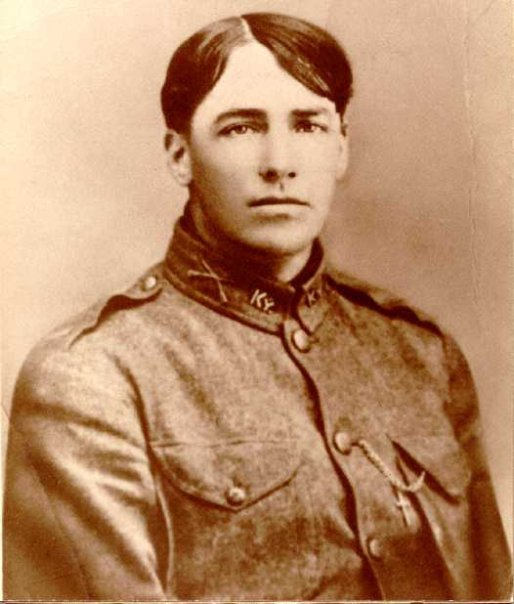
Wilburn, 1908

Born in Pineville, Bell County, Kentucky, Wilburn attended local schools and entered the United States Army Infantry when he came of age, serving two enlistments in the 1890s. Afterward, he joined the Kentucky National Guard, the state militia.

In 1906, then Lieutenant Wilburn attracted attention by capturing a notorious fugitive criminal. He led a National Guard detachment into Virginia on horseback to hunt Frank Ball, who had escaped from the Kentucky penitentiary where he was serving a life sentence. The pursuit ended in a shootout at Rufus Ball's farm. Ball was captured and one of his men killed. “The capture of Frank Ball was a thrilling chapter in the criminal history of the Virginia Mountains,” said the local press.

== Black Patch Tobacco Wars ==
In 1907 and 1908, a vigilante group known as The Night Riders terrorized the "Black Patch" 30-county region of western Kentucky and Tennessee, where Dark Fired Tobacco was produced. The Planters Protective Association of Kentucky and Tennessee had organized to gain more power as growers against the James B. Duke tobacco conglomerate (American Tobacco Company, ATC). It had exercised its monopoly power to lower prices offered to tobacco growers. First working to persuade farmers to join the ATC, the Night Riders received paramilitary training and began to exert harsher power: they whipped disloyal members, murdered opponents, burned buildings and tobacco stores, and temporarily seized entire towns, including three county seats in Kentucky in late 1907 and 1908. In 1908, The New York Times reported, “There now exists in the State of Kentucky a condition of affairs without parallel in the history of the world." Governor Augustus E. Willson ordered Wilburn and others of the Kentucky Guard with soldiers to end the violence.

In the spring of 1908, while living in Sturgis, Union County, Kentucky, Wilburn made a series of arrests of Night Rider leaders and protected numerous key informers. He gained the help of former Night Riders, including Macon Champion, who implicated fifteen other local farmers. The arrests broke the power of the Night Riders and effectively ended the Black Patch War. Lieutenant Wilburn was rewarded with a promotion to captain.

The battle against the American Tobacco Company continued, but now in the courts. On May 9, 1911, the United States Supreme Court ruled that the American Tobacco Company was in fact an illegal monopoly and violated the Sherman Anti-Trust Act of 1890. 5. 221 U.S. 106 (1911). The company was ordered to dismantle. Other factors also contributed to the tobacco farmers gaining higher prices for their commodity crop.

== Later life and legacy ==
After the Black Patch Tobacco Wars, Wilburn met his future bride, Lula Wren, on the train station platform in Springfield, Tennessee. He worked as a coal miner in Union County and later served as US postmaster in Muhlenberg County. He died in January 1927 age 52 of peritonitis following a "fall on rough ground".
