= Black Patch Tobacco Wars =

Price war and violence over tobacco prices early 1900s Kentucky and Tennessee

The Black Patch Tobacco Wars were a period of civil unrest and violence in the western counties of the U.S. states of Kentucky and Tennessee at the turn of the 20th century, circa 1904–1909. The so-called "Black Patch" consists of about 30 counties in southwestern Kentucky and northwestern Tennessee. During that period this area was the leading worldwide supplier of dark fired tobacco. It was so named for the wood smoke and fire-curing process which it undergoes after harvest. This type of tobacco is used primarily in snuff, chewing and pipe tobacco.

The primary participants were the American Tobacco Company (ATC) (owned by James B. Duke), historically one of the largest U.S. industrial monopolies, and the Dark Tobacco District Planters' Protective Association of Kentucky and Tennessee (PPA). This association of planters formed on September 24, 1904, in protest of the monopsony ATC practice of paying deflated prices for their product and with the intent to control their own product and pricing by banding together. The initial idea of the PPA was to "pool" and withhold their tobacco until the ATC agreed to pay higher prices. When this plan was unsuccessful, many farmers resorted to violence and vigilante practices, organizing as the Silent Brigade or Night Riders. They committed numerous acts of violence and destroyed crops, machinery, livestock, and tobacco warehouses, even capturing whole towns. They raided Princeton, Hopkinsville, and Russellville, Kentucky, destroying tobacco warehouses,

== The players ==
=== The American Tobacco Company ===
James Buchanan "Buck" Duke of North Carolina was an ambitious businessman and planter who quickly learned that profit was maximized buying and selling tobacco, not producing it. In 1879, the W. Duke Sons and Company was established as a tobacco manufacturer and began producing cigarettes. Two years later, the commercial cigarette-rolling machine was invented by James Bonsack. Duke quickly rented two of these machines, allowing his company to produce 400 cigarettes per minute. In 1884, he struck a deal with its inventor to use his machines exclusively in manufacturing cigarettes in exchange for lower royalties. The lowered manufacturing costs realized allowed him to cut his retail prices so low that his competitors couldn't compete. By 1890, Duke was able to compel his major competitors to consolidate with him as the American Tobacco Company (ATC).

By 1900, the ATC had a stranglehold on the American market and had made inroads into foreign markets, affecting the majority of the world's tobacco sales either directly or through foreign partnerships. Duke used this power to reduce his tobacco-buying price by eliminating the competitive bidding process. This brought many farmers to the brink of financial ruin or led to the complete loss of their farms, as they found it cost more to plant their crop than they earned on it.

The ATC's collusive fixed-price purchasing policy, combined with a new Federal tax on tobacco, placed tobacco producers into an impossible situation.

=== Dark Tobacco District Planters' Protective Association of Kentucky and Tennessee ===
In 1904, Felix Ewing, a wealthy tobacco planter and owner of Glenraven Plantation near the Kentucky stateline in Adams, Tennessee, proposed a way for the Black Patch growers to regain control of their sale prices. Glenraven Plantation, developed like a company town, had its own church, stores and post office, and its residents were tenant farmers and sharecroppers. Because of the decline in sale price of their product, they were defecting to find better-paying opportunities in the cotton industry. During the summer of 1904, Ewing discussed his idea throughout the region and on September 24, 1904, hosted a meeting in Guthrie, Kentucky, attended by some 5,000 locals. He presented a plan for every farmer in the area to join a protective association whose purpose was withholding their tobacco from the Trust until buyers paid their asking price.

The group moved to form the new organization, the "Dark Tobacco District Planters' Protective Association of Kentucky and Tennessee,” referred to as the PPA. Officers were appointed, and a charter drawn up and approved. One article called upon each member to use his influence and strong endeavor with those tobacco planters who are not members of the Association to become members. This provision was implemented in a way that resulted in years of unrest and violence.

The PPA gained instant popularity throughout the region, among both farmers and businessmen. For those who were indifferent about the Association, a boycott of their businesses was generally enough to convince them to join.

The number of members soared as farmers anticipated an immediate resolution to their problem, and included judges, prosecutors and law enforcement officials. However, some farmers refused to join. When the Trust fought back by offering exceptionally higher prices for tobacco sold by non-members, the number of holdouts increased. PPA members referred to these hold-outs as "hillbillies".

The PPA inadvertently created new tensions in the region, dividing men who had previously worked closely together if they had opposite ideas about joining the association. This situation worsened as PPA members turned to violence to "persuade" former friends to join.

Conditions for the growers did not improve by 1905, causing dissension among the members who had expected an immediate turnaround. What had started as an idea for a peaceful resolution turned ugly.

== Silent Brigade and Night Riders ==
Ewing fell ill and became less of a regular presence. More radical members took power, promoting a harsher approach to handling the farmers' problems. Dr. David Amoss, a farmer and country doctor from Cobb, Kentucky who lived in Caldwell County rose to a position of notoriety within the Association. He took a lead when frustrated members wanted to take stronger action.

=== Possum Hunters ===
"In October 1905 thirty-two members of the Robertson County Branch of the PPA met at the Stainback schoolhouse in the northern part of the county and adopted the "Resolutions of the committee of the Possum Hunters Organization. "The possum hunters outlined their grievances against the Trust and the farmers and stated their intention to visit Trust tobacco buyers and farmers in groups of no fewer than five and no more than two thousand and use "peaceful" methods to convince buyers and non-poolers to adhere to the PPA."

The idea caught on quickly and Possum Hunter groups began to spring up throughout the region. They paid visits to non-PPA members, delivering stern lectures on the advisability of joining the cause. Gradually, however, their activities grew more violent.

=== Rise of the Night Riders: The Black Patch turns violent. ===
Amoss had been a cadet and drillmaster at Major Ferrell's Military School in Hopkinsville, Kentucky. He used this background to begin training his groups as paramilitary insurgents. They conducted nocturnal mounted raids, while wearing masks, hoods and robes, and riding in well-organized columns of twos. When on a mission, they muffled their mounts' hooves with cloths, and rode silently, carrying torches and lanterns. As a result, they began referring to themselves as the Silent Brigade. By mid-1906, they numbered an estimated 10,000 members.

They began beating and whipping non-compliant people, officials and Trust employees. They burned people's barns and destroyed their tobacco fields and plant beds by scraping, salting, or choking the young plants with grass seed. Amoss ordered his men to burn or otherwise destroy the property of growers, and whip them and other persons who refused to cooperate with them in their fight against the Trust.

=== Raid on Princeton, Kentucky ===
According to local accounts, on December 1, 1906, small groups of Night Riders drifted during the day into Princeton, Kentucky, the seat of Caldwell County. At an appointed time some raided and occupied the police station, while others simultaneously seized the telegraph and telephone offices, and the fire station, and shut off the city water supply. Some 200 masked men arrived at night, riding down the main street of Princeton. Armed with rifles, shotguns, and pistols, they began firing, waking the townspeople. As lights came on, if anyone looked out or tried to venture outside, the riders would shout "stay in your houses!" and "keep the lights off!", then shoot to shatter windows and door frames.

The riders moved swiftly toward the J.G. Orr Tobacco Factory (located at the corner of North Seminary and West Shephardson Street), where they placed sticks of dynamite under piles of tobacco and doused the building with kerosene. They tossed a flaming torch into the warehouse, which quickly went up in flames and became a raging inferno. The raiders moved to the Steger & Dollar Warehouse (located about 5 blocks south at the corner of South Seminary and Depot Street) and set it on fire as well. Then with three long whistle blasts the men came together, then slowly and methodically rode out of town singing "The fires shine bright on my old Kentucky home" bringing the night of terror to an end. Both warehouses were completely destroyed, along with 75 tons of non-PPA tobacco.

=== Raid on Hopkinsville ===
News of the Princeton raid spread rapidly. Residents of nearby Hopkinsville, the county seat of Christian County, worried that their town could be next. The police, a large contingent of armed citizens, and the state militia prepared to protect the town from the expected raid.

On January 4, 1907, Hopkinsville Mayor Charles Meacham received a telephone call warning that the Riders were coming. He set the defense plan in action, and the different units were alerted and took their positions, but the warning was a hoax, a test of the city's preparedness.

As had been the case in Princeton, Night Riders regularly drifted in and out of town to keep an eye on what was going on, in order to properly plan the raid and be prepared to pull it off at the right time. For months the riders assembled, ready to strike. On one such night as they approached the city limits, they received word the militia was waiting for them and turned back. Finally, in the early hours of December 7, 1907, the Silent Brigade struck Hopkinsville.

They left their horses outside town, and about 250 masked men marched down 9th Street to Main, where they separated and carried out their orders with military precision. Several men guarded the routes into the city and other downtown streets, while others took control of the police and fire departments, L&N rail depot, and the telephone and telegraph offices, essentially cutting off communications. Others rode up and down the streets, shooting out windows whenever a light would be turned on. They held several people hostage in a makeshift corral on Main Street. Many businesses were vandalized, including the newspaper office. Lindsey Mitchell, a buyer for a local tobacco company, was dragged from his home and beaten. The Night Riders took complete control of the city.

The largest group first burned the Latham warehouse near the Rail Depot, then the Tandy and Fairleigh warehouse a few blocks away. The fires burned out of control, igniting several residences and the PPA warehouse. J.C. Felts, a brakeman working for the railroad, was shot in the back with 35 pellets of buckshot (but survived the injury) as he tried to save railcars from the fire. Dr. Amoss was accidentally wounded in the head by his own men and was taken away from town early to be treated.

As had occurred in Princeton, when the raid concluded the men assembled, and sang "My Old Kentucky Home" while riding out.

While the raid was taking place, Major Bassett, commander of the militia, slipped out a rear window in his house and raised a posse of eleven men to pursue the Night Riders as they left town. Because the Night Riders failed to post a rear guard, members of the posse were able to mingle with them. Several miles outside of town the Night Riders split up, with most riding off in a different direction. The posse stayed with the smaller group and opened fire, killing one man and injuring another.

As a result of the raid on Hopkinsville, the governor ordered the Kentucky Militia on active duty. Major Bassett was given command of all military operations in the area. The militia would remain on duty from December 1907 until November 1908. No raids took place where the soldiers were stationed.

=== Raids on Russellville ===
In the early hours of January 3, 1908, while the soldiers were guarding Hopkinsville and other towns, the Night Riders hit Russellville, Kentucky, the seat of Logan County. Using similar tactics as previously, they took over the town and dynamited two factories, one belonging to the Luckett Wake Tobacco Company and the other to the American Snuff Company. Additional violence took place in the county from the spring on, with an increasing number of attacks on blacks as tensions and violence rose.

On August 1, 1908, about one hundred masked men believed to be Night Riders entered the jail in Russellville and demanded four black prisoners: Joseph Riley, and Virgil, Robert, and Thomas Jones. The frightened jailer complied. The four men were local sharecroppers, and friends with Rufus Browder.

Browder was a sharecropper for a white landowner named James Cunningham. Cunningham and Browder had engaged in an altercation, and Cunningham hit Browder with a whip and shot him as the sharecropper had turned to walk away. Browder returned fire, killing Cunningham in self-defense. Browder was arrested and taken to another town for protection. His friends and Masonic lodge brothers, Riley and the three Jones, were arrested for allegedly having expressed approval of Browder's actions, as well as discontent with their employers. The Night Riders are believed to have taken the four men from the jail and hanged them all from the same tree. They pinned a racist warning to the clothing of one man.

=== Raids in Crittenden County ===
On February 4, 1908, Crittenden County was raided for the first time. Night Riders took over the small village of Dycusburg, Kentucky, burning the tobacco warehouse and distillery of Bennett Brothers. During the raid they took W. B. Groves from his home and severely whipped him because he refused to join the Association. They also seized Henry Bennett, and after binding him to a tree, they whipped him with the branches of a thorn tree.

During the early hours of the following Sunday, February 10, the Riders attacked in the county again. They raided the farm of A. H. Cardin, a former candidate for state governor. They burned his large warehouse, which contained tobacco that he had purchased for Buckner & Dunkerson of Louisville, as well as a barn containing tobacco grown on his own farm. On their way to Cardin's farm, the Night Riders passed through the small community of Fredonia, in Caldwell County. They took over the town and held the inhabitants under guard while the raid took place on Cardin's farm near Mexico, Kentucky.

=== Raid on Birmingham, KY ===
On April 9, 1908, Lyon County Night Riders crossed the Tennessee on the Birmingham Ferry, and rode into the small African-American section of the Marshall County river town of Birmingham, Kentucky. The Night Riders fired gunshots into every home there as a warning to the African-Americans of Birmingham to move on and not be hired for the tobacco fields of the "enemy" tobacco growers. Apparently, most white residents of the area had been sufficiently dissuaded from working in these competitor fields, but the black residents hadn't "gotten the message", as far as the Lyon County Night Riders were concerned. The intimidation shots fired into the rows of houses unfortunately struck a few people, including the fatal wounding of an elderly African American named John Scruggs and the fatal wounding of his young grandson in the same round of fire. Some African Americans were taken from their homes and held down to be whipped.

Marshall County authorities were relentless in their investigation of this raid. Burnett Phelps was the first raider to be brought to trial. Black victims, refugees from Birmingham, were encouraged to sue in court for damages. By December 1908, two men who confessed to being lesser leaders in the raid were persuaded to turn State's evidence and admit their crimes. However, Ed Fox, one of these men, had several younger brothers and in-laws in the Riders and was filled with remorse or fear for them. Deciding he would be better off dead, as he was about to shoot himself in the head, his wife discovered him and grabbed the pistol. He accidentally shot himself in the stomach, dying in agony a few days after Christmas, 1908. The other witness, Fred Holden, also committed suicide rather than testify. Otis Blick, a Night Rider, did testify in court, having little choice since his Night Rider mask was found hidden in a tree stump. He admitted that he was inducted into the Riders in Amous Stringer's barbershop. After being put through some "strange rites", he was taught the passwords of the Night RIders. "Silent Brigade" was spoken; replied with, "I see you have been there"; counter-replied with, "Yes, on bended knees."

The Lyon County Night Riders attempted to intimidate the Marshall County Judge (Judge William Reed) and the Court at Benton, even so much as staging a ride through the town. But their tactic backfired, and led the authorities there to pursue the men even harder, seeking to bring to justice the killers of a black man and a black boy. One Dr. Emilius Champion of Lyon Co., a popular physician, was indicted by popular belief to have been the ringleader of the Lyon County Night Riders and would later serve a year in the Eddyville Kentucky State Penitentiary based on a convincing circumstantial case and eyewitness testimony. Two of the Black plaintiffs, L. A. Baker, and schoolteacher Nat Frizzell, were each awarded $25,000.00 in damages, payable by even shares from the 72 defendants. In each case, the juries were only out five minutes.

== The wars come to an end ==
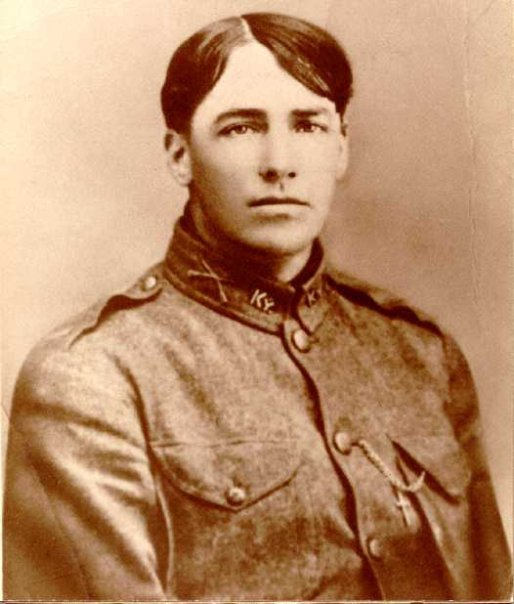
Captain N.J. Wilburn 1908

In April 1908, a Kentucky State Guard detachment commanded by Lieutenant Newton Jasper Wilburn led a series of raids against the Night Riders' leaders. Wilburn arrested several of the men and also provided protection to several key informers. He gained the help of former Night Riders, including Macon Champion, who implicated fifteen local farmers. The arrests broke the power of the Night Riders and effectively ended the Black Patch War. Lieutenant Wilburn was rewarded with a promotion to captain. Even though most men arrested were not convicted at trial, Capt. Wilburn's actions helped bring law and order to the region.

=== Aftermath ===
By the summer of 1910, the Night Rider trouble had come to an end except for a few scattered minor episodes. The tobacco growers were now receiving higher prices for their crops. A challenge to the ATC reached the US Supreme Court, which ruled in United States v. American Tobacco Co. (1911) that the Duke trust, ATC, was a monopoly and was in violation of the Sherman Anti-Trust Act of 1890. It ordered the ATC to dismantle.

== Poetry ==
THE OLD KNOTTY OAK

On the old Knotty Oak in North Christian
Way out on the Kirkmansville Road,
There has lately been posted a notice,
To all farmers, the bad and the good.
Its just a "guilt" edged invitation
Placed there by a Night Rider brave (?)
"Better join the 'Sociation,
If you plant beds and barns you would save."
It was stylishly dressed up in canvas,
And written by type-writer's hand,
It was worded in terms so expressive,
That any one might understand.
The farmers were warned to come over,
that they were in danger outside,
All tobacco must be in the union,
And the signature this "Men who ride."
Now, Old Knotty has long been a landmark,
Not noted for beauty 'tis true,
But a study and silent old fellow
And of secrets he's heard quite a few.
Wiley words of the smooth politician,
Merry laughter of children at play.
Whispered wooing of lovers by moonlight,
All of these he has heard in his day,
The patient ox, the tired horses in summer
How they long for his shade by the road.
To them he's the feed ground, the noon hour,
and rest from the weary road.
Old has held all the sale bills;
He's proud of the nails in his side.
But his head hangs in humiliation
At the threat of the bad "Men who ride."
However he's keeping the secret,
but of course he would know just at sight
The face of the man who disgraced him,
by posting a threat in the night
The people who live near Old Knotty,
and quietly working their farms,
but they've nothing to lose by marauders,
No plant beds, tobacco or barns.
They are not opposed to the Union,
Its findings they would not revoke.
But they'd like a 'polite invitation,
Instead of a threat to the Oak.
They've read long ago, in an old book,
That in Union alone man may stand;
That a house with its members divided,
Is like the one build on the sand.
then, here's to the D.T. 'Sociation,
May its principles ever abide,
Here's to order and law in Old Christian
But contempt for the men who ride."

- -This poem was published many years ago in The Kentucky New Era.

== See also ==
- Night Rider, a 1939 novel by Robert Penn Warren
- ’’Black Patch War’’ 2008 EP by Common Market
