= Flat Rock, Kentucky =

Unincorporated community in Kentucky, United States

Flat Rock
- Unincorporated community
- Location within the state of Kentucky Flat Rock (the United States)
- Coordinates: 37°14′1″N 87°57′57″W
- Country: United States
- State: Kentucky
- County: Caldwell
- Elevation: 512 ft (156 m)
- Time zone: UTC-6 (Central (CST))
  - Summer (DST): UTC-5 (CST)
- GNIS feature ID: 492203

Flat Rock is an unincorporated community in Caldwell County, Kentucky, United States.

Flat Rock was named for the natural outcrop which surrounded the settlement.
