= Caldwell County, Kentucky =

County in Kentucky, United States

- County
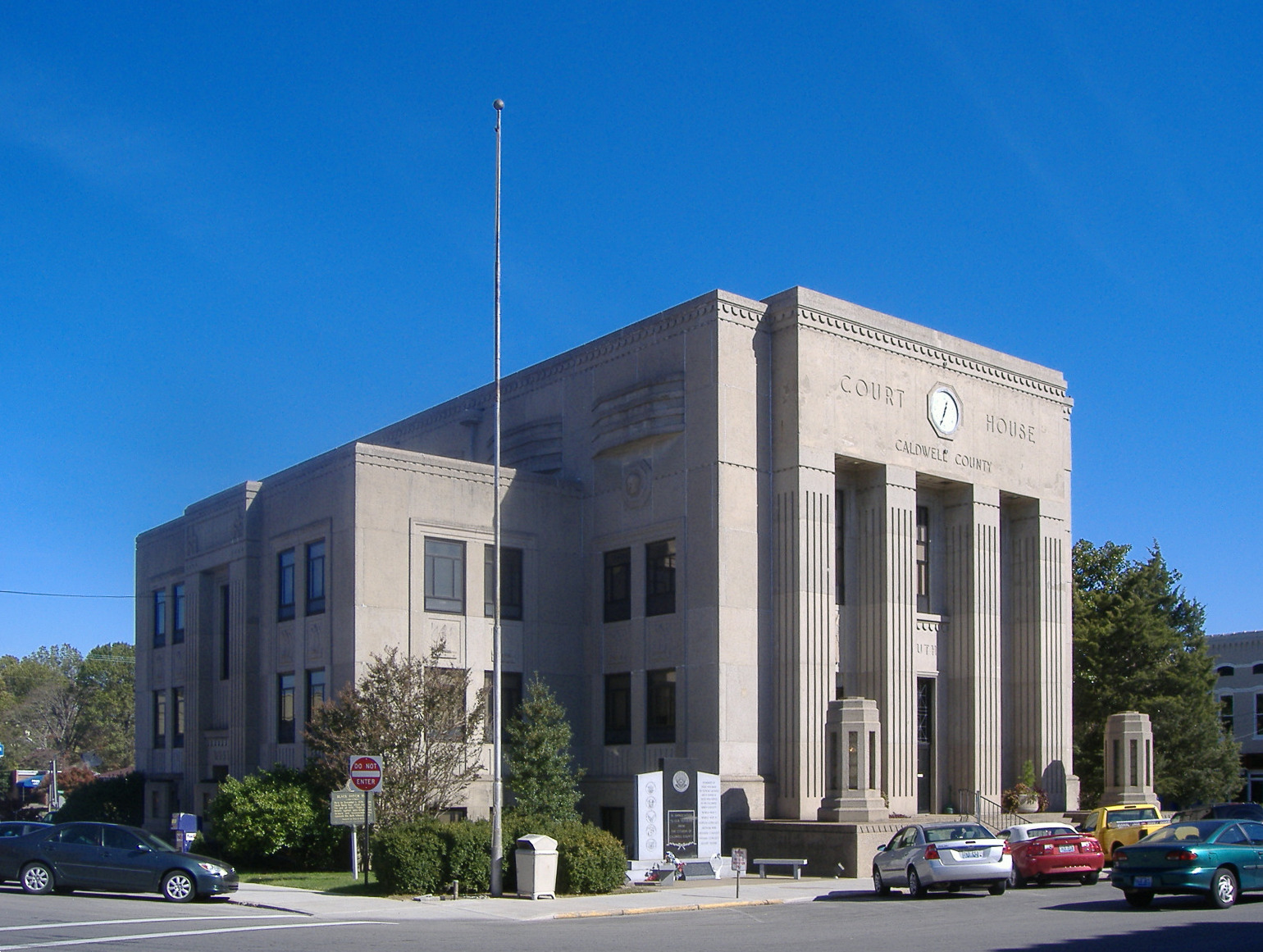
- Caldwell County courthouse in Princeton

- Location within the U.S. state of Kentucky
- Coordinates: 37°09′N 87°52′W
- Country: United States
- State: Kentucky
- Founded: 1809
- Named for: John Caldwell
- Seat: Princeton
- Largest city: Princeton

Government
  - Judge/Executive: Dakota Young (R)

Area
  - Total: 348 sq mi (900 km^{2})
  - Land: 345 sq mi (890 km^{2})
  - Water: 3.4 sq mi (8.8 km^{2}) 1.0%

Population (2020)
  - Total: 12,649
  - Estimate (2025): 12,609 ▼
  - Density: 36.7/sq mi (14.2/km^{2})
- Time zone: UTC−6 (Central)
  - Summer (DST): UTC−5 (CDT)
- Congressional district: 1st
- Website: caldwellcounty.ky.gov

Caldwell County is a county located in the U.S. state of Kentucky. As of the 2020 census, the population was 12,649. Its county seat is Princeton. The county was formed in 1809 from Livingston County, Kentucky and named for John Caldwell, who participated in the George Rogers Clark Indian Campaign of 1786 and was the second lieutenant governor of Kentucky. Caldwell was a prohibition or dry county until 2013, when the citizens voted to lift the ban.

== History ==
Historical marker in Princeton

Caldwell County was formed from Livingston County in 1809. Prior to that, Caldwell County had been part of Christian, Logan, and Lincoln Counties — Lincoln County having been one of the three original counties of Kentucky.

In the early nineteenth-century, Caldwell County witnessed the passage of the forced migration of the Cherokee to the West on the Trail of Tears during Indian removal. The Cherokee camped for several weeks in Caldwell County during the winter of 1838, mainly at Big Springs, now in downtown Princeton; at Skin Frame Creek, and in the Centerville area near Fredonia.

In 1860, the construction of Princeton College began, but it was delayed by the Civil War. Strongly pro-Confederate and one of the counties that sent a secessionist delegate to the Russellville Convention, which signed an Ordinance of Secession forming the Confederate government of Kentucky. Confederate troops camped on the grounds of Princeton College in 1861, using one of its buildings as a hospital when Princeton came under Confederate control. Following the Confederate retreat in early 1862, however, Union soldiers occupied Princeton for the remainder of the war. In December 1864, raiding Kentucky Confederate cavalry commanded by General Hylan B. Lyon burned the Caldwell County courthouse in Princeton, since it was being used to house the Union garrison.

The expansion of railroads in the late nineteenth century made Princeton an important junction on several major railway lines, most notably the Illinois Central and the Louisville & Nashville.

By the turn of the century, an agricultural boom in Dark Fired Tobacco had made Caldwell County, along with Christian County, a major tobacco-growing area. It was part of what was called the "Black Patch", which used a special process to cure the tobacco. It included about 30 counties in western Kentucky and Tennessee. But the monopolization of the tobacco market by James B. Duke, who formed the American Tobacco Company, forced prices lower, leaving many farmers in debt and discontented.

In response, planters formed the Dark Tobacco District Planters' Protective Association of Kentucky and Tennessee (PPA), to work together in pooling their commodity in order to gain higher prices. They initially used persuasion to urge other farmers to join them.

Under the leadership of Dr. David Amoss of Cobb in Caldwell County, a vigilante force called the Night Riders was formed to strengthen the persuasion. The Night Riders terrorized those who cooperated with the tobacco company by destroying crops, burning warehouses, and attacking individuals. The Night Riders took over Princeton one night in December 1906, burning all of the Duke tobacco warehouses. They raided other towns, conducting similar raids and destroying resources. The "Black Patch Wars" came to an end around 1908, finally suppressed with the aid of the Kentucky state militia.

Since 1925, Caldwell County has housed the University of Kentucky Research and Education Center, a campus of the University of Kentucky's College of Agriculture. The "UKREC" in Princeton is a leader in horticultural and biological sciences.

In the mid-twentieth century, Caldwell County began to shift from agriculture to industrialization. Caldwell County is still largely agricultural, but it is also home to factories such as Bremner, the largest private cookie and cracker factory in North America.

== Geography ==
According to the U.S. Census Bureau, the county has a total area of 348 square miles (900 km^{2}), of which 345 square miles (890 km^{2}) is land and 3.4 square miles (8.8 km^{2}) (1.0%) is water.

=== Adjacent counties ===
- Crittenden County (northwest)
- Webster County (northeast)
- Hopkins County (northeast)
- Christian County (southeast)
- Trigg County (south)
- Lyon County (southwest)

== Demographics ==
Historical population
Census	Pop.	Note	%±
1810	4,268		—
1820	9,022		111.4%
1830	8,324		−7.7%
1840	10,365		24.5%
1850	13,048		25.9%
1860	9,318		−28.6%
1870	10,826		16.2%
1880	11,282		4.2%
1890	13,186		16.9%
1900	14,510		10.0%
1910	14,063		−3.1%
1920	13,975		−0.6%
1930	13,781		−1.4%
1940	14,499		5.2%
1950	13,199		−9.0%
1960	13,073		−1.0%
1970	13,179		0.8%
1980	13,473		2.2%
1990	13,232		−1.8%
2000	13,060		−1.3%
2010	12,984		−0.6%
2020	12,649		−2.6%
2025 (est.)	12,609	▼	−0.3%
U.S. Decennial Census; 1790-1960 1900-1990; 1990-2000 2010-2021

=== 2020 census ===
As of the 2020 census, the county had a population of 12,649. The median age was 44.2 years. 21.7% of residents were under the age of 18 and 21.7% of residents were 65 years of age or older. For every 100 females there were 94.2 males, and for every 100 females age 18 and over there were 90.6 males age 18 and over.

The racial makeup of the county was 88.9% White, 5.3% Black or African American, 0.2% American Indian and Alaska Native, 0.4% Asian, 0.0% Native Hawaiian and Pacific Islander, 0.6% from some other race, and 4.6% from two or more races. Hispanic or Latino residents of any race comprised 1.6% of the population.

47.9% of residents lived in urban areas, while 52.1% lived in rural areas.

There were 5,277 households in the county, of which 28.4% had children under the age of 18 living with them and 28.5% had a female householder with no spouse or partner present. About 30.1% of all households were made up of individuals and 15.1% had someone living alone who was 65 years of age or older.

There were 6,082 housing units, of which 13.2% were vacant. Among occupied housing units, 74.3% were owner-occupied and 25.7% were renter-occupied. The homeowner vacancy rate was 1.9% and the rental vacancy rate was 8.7%.

=== 2000 census ===
As of the census of 2000, there were 13,060 people, 5,431 households, and 3,801 families residing in the county. The population density was 38 per square mile (15/km^{2}). There were 6,126 housing units at an average density of 18 per square mile (6.9/km^{2}). The racial makeup of the county was 93.89% White, 4.81% Black or African American, 0.15% Native American, 0.16% Asian, 0.01% Pacific Islander, 0.39% from other races, and 0.60% from two or more races. 0.61% of the population were Hispanic or Latino of any race.

There were 5,431 households, out of which 28.50% had children under the age of 18 living with them, 57.10% were married couples living together, 9.80% had a female householder with no husband present, and 30.00% were non-families. 27.50% of all households were made up of individuals, and 14.00% had someone living alone who was 65 years of age or older. The average household size was 2.36 and the average family size was 2.85.

In the county, the population was spread out, with 22.40% under the age of 18, 7.00% from 18 to 24, 26.30% from 25 to 44, 26.30% from 45 to 64, and 18.00% who were 65 years of age or older. The median age was 41 years. For every 100 females there were 92.60 males. For every 100 females age 18 and over, there were 89.90 males.

The median income for a household in the county was $28,686, and the median income for a family was $35,258. Males had a median income of $31,475 versus $20,390 for females. The per capita income for the county was $16,264. About 12.20% of families and 15.90% of the population were below the poverty line, including 20.40% of those under age 18 and 15.60% of those age 65 or over.

== Communities ==
=== Cities ===
- Dawson Springs (mostly in Hopkins County)
- Fredonia
- Princeton (county seat)

=== Unincorporated communities ===
- Bakers
- Baldwin Ford
- Black Hawk (partially in Trigg County)
- The Bluff
- Bucksnort
- Cedar Bluff
- Claxton
- Cobb
- Cresswell
- Crider
- Crowtown
- Dulaney
- Enon
- Farmersville
- Flat Rock
- Friendship
- Fryer
- Harper Ford
- Hopson
- Lake Shore
- Lewistown
- McGowan
- Midway
- Needmore
- Otter Pond
- Pumpkin Center
- Quinn
- Rufus
- Scottsburg
- Smith Ford
- Tom Gray Ford
- Walche Cut
- White Sulphur

== Politics ==
United States presidential election results for Caldwell County, Kentucky
Year	Republican		Democratic		Third party(ies)	
Year	No.	%	No.	%	No.	%
1908	1,517	48.28%	1,541	49.05%	84	2.67%
1912	1,263	42.61%	1,231	41.53%	470	15.86%
1916	1,672	50.01%	1,605	48.01%	66	1.97%
1920	2,958	51.07%	2,746	47.41%	88	1.52%
1924	2,498	51.45%	2,183	44.96%	174	3.58%
1928	2,855	62.61%	1,695	37.17%	10	0.22%
1932	2,020	40.09%	2,971	58.96%	48	0.95%
1936	2,121	43.75%	2,699	55.67%	28	0.58%
1940	2,246	43.78%	2,858	55.71%	26	0.51%
1944	2,242	47.74%	2,444	52.04%	10	0.21%
1948	1,626	39.33%	2,210	53.46%	298	7.21%
1952	2,507	53.91%	2,133	45.87%	10	0.22%
1956	2,681	52.32%	2,417	47.17%	26	0.51%
1960	3,442	61.70%	2,137	38.30%	0	0.00%
1964	1,738	37.80%	2,831	61.57%	29	0.63%
1968	2,139	42.23%	1,439	28.41%	1,487	29.36%
1972	2,952	66.32%	1,345	30.22%	154	3.46%
1976	1,808	36.91%	3,016	61.56%	75	1.53%
1980	2,609	46.22%	2,924	51.80%	112	1.98%
1984	3,162	55.93%	2,427	42.93%	64	1.13%
1988	2,952	52.93%	2,564	45.97%	61	1.09%
1992	1,966	34.79%	3,000	53.09%	685	12.12%
1996	2,067	40.10%	2,434	47.22%	654	12.69%
2000	3,161	57.66%	2,223	40.55%	98	1.79%
2004	4,066	64.04%	2,245	35.36%	38	0.60%
2008	3,866	62.36%	2,212	35.68%	121	1.95%
2012	3,904	66.62%	1,852	31.60%	104	1.77%
2016	4,507	75.43%	1,260	21.09%	208	3.48%
2020	4,906	76.25%	1,433	22.27%	95	1.48%
2024	4,860	78.54%	1,256	20.30%	72	1.16%

=== Elected officials ===
Elected officials as of January 3, 2025
U.S. House	James Comer (R)	KY 1
Ky. Senate	Craig Richardson (R)	3
Ky. House	Walker Thomas (R)	8

== Education ==
School districts include:

- Caldwell County School District
- Dawson Springs Independent School District

== See also ==
- National Register of Historic Places listings in Caldwell County, Kentucky
