= Rufus, Kentucky =

Unincorporated community in Kentucky, United States

Rufus
- Unincorporated community
- Location within the state of Kentucky Rufus (the United States)
- Coordinates: 37°14′04″N 87°53′02″W
- Country: United States
- State: Kentucky
- County: Caldwell
- Elevation: 433 ft (132 m)
- Time zone: UTC−6 (CST)
  - Summer (DST): UTC−5 (CDT)
- ZIP codes: 42445
- GNIS feature ID: 508985

Rufus is a rural unincorporated community in northern Caldwell County, Kentucky, United States.
