= Black Hawk, Kentucky =

Unincorporated community in Kentucky, United States

- Unincorporated community
- Location within the state of Kentucky Black Hawk (the United States)
- Coordinates: 36°57′36″N 87°52′28″W
- Country: United States
- State: Kentucky
- County: Caldwell, Trigg
- Elevation: 538 ft (164 m)
- Time zone: UTC-6 (Central (CST))
  - Summer (DST): UTC-5 (CST)
- GNIS feature ID: 507515

Black Hawk is an unincorporated community in Caldwell and Trigg counties, Kentucky, United States.
