= Wilburn Hooker =

Mississippi politician

Edwin Wilburn Hooker Sr.

Member of the Mississippi House of Representatives
- In office 1956–1964

Member of the Mississippi Senate
- Constituency: Holmes County, Mississippi

Personal details
- Born: July 17, 1913 United States
- Died: July 10, 1989 United States
- Party: Democratic
- Occupation: Farmer, cattleman, businessman, politician
- Known for: Segregationist policies

Edwin Wilburn Hooker Sr. (July 17, 1913 – July 10, 1989) was an American farmer, cattleman, and businessman who served as a state legislator in Mississippi. Served in the Mississippi House of Representatives from 1956 to 1964. He represented Holmes County, Mississippi in the Mississippi Senate.

He served on the Mississippi State Sovereignty Commission, a state agency established to preserve segregation. A staunch segregationist, he pushed a 1954 bill to rescind Mississippi's offer of land for a new Veterans Administration Hospital because it would be integrated. He also took issue with book purchases by the University of Mississippi. Hooker authored a bill in 1956 that would allow citizens' councils to receive state funds in order to continue segregation in the state.

Hooker was a member of the Freemasons, the Shriners, and belonged to the Veterans of Foreign Wars (VFW).
