= Friendship, Kentucky =

Unincorporated community in Kentucky, United States

Friendship
- Unincorporated community
- Location within the state of Kentucky Friendship (the United States)
- Coordinates: 37°3′25″N 87°45′59″W
- Country: United States
- State: Kentucky
- County: Caldwell
- Elevation: 528 ft (161 m)
- Time zone: UTC-6 (Central (CST))
  - Summer (DST): UTC-5 (CST)
- GNIS feature ID: 508040

Friendship is an unincorporated community in Caldwell County, Kentucky, United States.
