= Cobb, Kentucky =

Unincorporated community in Kentucky, United States

Cobb
- Unincorporated community
- Location within the state of Kentucky Cobb (the United States)
- Coordinates: 36°59′25″N 87°46′44″W
- Country: United States
- State: Kentucky
- County: Caldwell
- Elevation: 459 ft (140 m)
- Time zone: UTC-6 (Central (CST))
  - Summer (DST): UTC-5 (CST)
- GNIS feature ID: 489747

Cobb is an unincorporated community in Caldwell County, Kentucky, United States.

A post office named Cobb operated from 1888 to 1974.
