= Fryer, Kentucky =

Unincorporated community in Kentucky, United States

Fryer
- Unincorporated community
- Location within the state of Kentucky Fryer (the United States)
- Coordinates: 37°15′44″N 87°49′11″W
- Country: United States
- State: Kentucky
- County: Caldwell
- Elevation: 387 ft (118 m)
- Time zone: UTC-6 (Central (CST))
  - Summer (DST): UTC-5 (CST)
- GNIS feature ID: 508049

Fryer is an unincorporated community in Caldwell County, Kentucky, United States. It was also known as The Hall, for a local Grange Hall.
