= Night Rider (novel) =

1939 novel by Robert Penn Warren

- First edition (publ. Houghton Mifflin)
- Author: Robert Penn Warren
- Language: English
- Genre: Historical novel
- Published: 1939
- Publication place: USA

Night Rider is the debut novel by American author Robert Penn Warren. It was published in the United States in 1939.

The book's main character, Percy Munn, is a young lawyer involved in a fictionalized version of the Black Patch Tobacco Wars, which took place in Kentucky and Tennessee in the early years of the 20th century.
