= Needmore, Caldwell County, Kentucky =

Unincorporated community in Kentucky, United States

Needmore
- Unincorporated community
- Location within the state of Kentucky Needmore (the United States)
- Coordinates: 37°13′18″N 87°50′43″W
- Country: United States
- State: Kentucky
- County: Caldwell
- Elevation: 607 ft (185 m)
- Time zone: UTC-6 (Central (CST))
  - Summer (DST): UTC-5 (CST)
- GNIS feature ID: 508682

Needmore is an unincorporated community in Caldwell County, Kentucky, United States.
