= Creswell, Kentucky =

Unincorporated community in Kentucky, United States

Creswell
- Unincorporated community
- Location within the state of Kentucky Creswell (the United States)
- Coordinates: 37°16′7″N 87°54′44″W
- Country: United States
- State: Kentucky
- County: Caldwell
- Elevation: 407 ft (124 m)
- Time zone: UTC-6 (Central (CST))
  - Summer (DST): UTC-5 (CST)
- GNIS feature ID: 507782

Creswell is an unincorporated community in Caldwell County, Kentucky, United States.
