= Planters' Protective Association =

Agrarian organization in Kentucky and Tennessee

The Planters' Protective Association (1904–1908) was an agrarian organization formed in the Kentucky and Tennessee "Black Patch" dedicated to fair business and the protection of farmers' economic interests in light of the market dominance of the American Tobacco Company.

In September 1904, following the threat of economic ruin as tobacco prices fell below the cost of production, white farmers in the region formed the Planters’ Protective Association. Representatives of the American Tobacco Company refused to negotiate with the leaders of the Association, asserting they lacked any feasible legal authority. Between 1906 and 1908, then, masked bands of Night Riders adopted a policy of vandalism and terrorism. These riders dynamited factories, set fire to trust warehouses, and destroyed thousands of dollars of property belonging to the tobacco monopoly in what would be later referred to as the "Great Tobacco Strike of the Century."

== Background ==
=== Southern Progressivism ===
By the early 20th century, following the expansion of Northeastern corporations into the Southern states, discontented farmers were united under the common goals of social and economic reform. Envisioning the corporate enterprises of the Northeast as a common threat – together with their myriad agents, insurance companies, oil trusts, lumber outfits, and railroads – Southern progressivism sought to "bust the trusts" and weaken the economic influence of the monopolies through the regulation of labor and franchise laws.

In the very soil that had nourished the Populist movement of the 1880s and 1890s, Southern progressivism connected with farmers, middle class workers, and small businessmen. While Southern reformists had historically been urban and middle class in nature, the growing pressures of monopoly and economic manipulation resulted in the political union between discontented farmers and middle class businessmen. "A new South has arisen, a South that is made up of young, progressive and wide-awake men," Alabama reformist Joseph Manning told a Northern newspaper in the late 1890s. "Now we have got to get a new regime in office, new blood, new brains; got to change the whole system and whole spirit of the South…"

The first Southern movement of the early 1900s to make a determined fight against economic manipulation ended in assassination. Led by Governor William Goebel, this campaign against the Louisville and Nashville Railroad marked an attempt to secure labor and franchise laws in Kentucky, and to call for the taxation of hidden railway capital. Goebel toured the state, rallying white, progressive-minded farmers to join him in his call for "the Louisville and Nashville [to become] the servant instead of the master of Kentucky." In January 1900, Goebel was shot and killed by an assassin whose identity was never determined. This left the progressive movement in Kentucky and Tennessee without an organized leader. For the next several years, the trusts in the region – most notably, capitalist Washington Duke's American Tobacco Company – operated with little organized opposition.

== Planters’ Protective Association, 1904-1908 ==
=== Creation ===
A region in Kentucky and Tennessee between Paducah and Nashville, the Black Patch is noted for the cultivation of its dark, heavy variety of tobacco. In 1904, Felix G. Ewing, a wealthy planter of Cedar Hill, in Robertson County, Tennessee, campaigned throughout the Black Patch calling for downtrodden tobacco farmers to join him in his crusade to become "apostles of the new idea." On September 24, 1904, a meeting was called to convene at Guthrie, Todd County, on the Kentucky-Tennessee line, where some 6,000 farmers assembled. Before the day ended the Planters’ Protective Association was organized.

=== The American Tobacco Company and economic manipulation ===
Farmers had been suffering financially for several months as tobacco prices fell below the cost of production in 1903. They were subject to conditions so deplorable that "many producers were compelled to sell tobacco at prices which returned them thirty cents a day" in a time when the average income for Southern tobacco farmers was upwards of $3.00. While some farmers speculated that this was due to overproduction of the region's cash-crop, dark-fried tobacco, the vast majority asserted that the real problem rested with the American Tobacco Company. The primary buyers of dark tobacco grown along the Kentucky-Tennessee border were representatives of the ATC and companies financed by the Italian government's tobacco monopoly, the Italian Regie. Representatives of the Planters’ Protection Association charged that these two companies had an agreement not to bid against one another. Agents of the Association gradually infiltrated local trust syndicates in the area between 1904 and 1905, and confirmed these speculations.

Formed in 1890, the American Tobacco Company, headed by North Carolina entrepreneur George Washington Duke, underwent a period of rapid expansion throughout the early 20th century. Due to technological advancements that allowed the production of machine-rolled cigarettes and cigars, the American Tobacco Company would be capitalized in excess of $235,000,000 by 1906. As the "Duke Trust" assumed control of the market, it subjected the "ignorant, illiterate, tenant-farmers" that had poured into the Black Patch to raise tobacco on share leases to precarious conditions. The company-owned shanties were in constant disrepair, characterized by "chipped paint, broken chimneys, and rotting doorjambs." Moreover, as middlemen and independent buyers were cut to a minimum and representatives of the ATC began buying directly from farmers, all competition in the market was eliminated.

=== Expansion and popularity ===
As early as 1901 the possible benefits of tobacco pooling – in which entire crops were to remain unsold in an attempt to pressure the market into higher tobacco prices – were frequent topics of discussion. In the early 1900s, wholesale prices of the Hopkinsville leaf, a dark type, sold as low as four to six cents a pound. The American Society of Equity, in the meantime, had commenced to penetrate the tobacco areas of Kentucky and Tennessee and once again some of the most influential planters in the region talked of the possibilities of cooperative action. Operating on the theory that agricultural producers were not receiving an equitable price for their products, the American Society of Equity conceived the idea of organizing the farmers to place a price on all products of the "farm and orchard." The leaders of this organization predicted that the farmers, if properly organized, could wield a power comparable to that of the organized labor unions in the cities. Riding on the popularity of the American Society of Equity, the Planters’ Protective Association, at its peak in 1905, was estimated to have some 30,000 members in western Kentucky and Tennessee.

=== Decline ===
By 1908, much of the vigor and determination that went into the organization of the Association gradually died out due to a combination of internal and external complications. Most notably, the unfavorable land tenure system, the indolent and indifferent farmer, financial inability, and trust opposition all succeeded in the delay of progressive action. One of the most discouraging obstacles that the Association faced was the independent farmer who asserted his independence by refusing to join the association. These nonmembers, or "hillbillies," believed a better price could be obtained by refusing to join the association, and, in many instances, actually succeeded in obtaining significantly higher prices from the ATC representatives due to the shortage of tobacco. One representative of the American Tobacco Company remarked: "What is the use of going into the association? We will give you as good and better prices than they can get for you and there will be no commissions or expenses. Sell to us direct, here is the cash for you now!" Consequently, this refusal of cooperation would ultimately result in the deterioration of the public's opinion of the Planters’ Protective Association.

== Black Patch War, 1906–1908 ==
Convinced of the futility of the Planters’ Protective Association's peaceful attempts at cooperation, the suggestion of violent action commenced to take hold in the minds of many of the more desperate, downtrodden farmers. "There existed, therefore, a deep-seated sense of grievance and injury," commented the progressive publication World's Work. "The farmers led to regard themselves as victims of organized and legalized plunder grew reckless in speech and bitter in spirit. Protests were futile, the courts no longer offered hope of redress. Organized opposition was the last resource." Consequently, angered by the rogue farmers that refused to cooperate with the Association, masked bands of night-riders – known as the "Silent Brigade" – "proceeded to organize secret bands, first to threaten him [the nonmember], next to destroy his property, finally to whip him, and if need were, to kill him." In what would later be called the Black Patch War, between 1906 and 1908, night-riding and vigilantism became a stark reality in the Black Patch badlands of Kentucky and Tennessee.
