= Night Rider =

Night Rider, Nightrider, or variants thereof may refer to:

== Literature ==
- Night Rider (novel), a 1939 novel by Robert Penn Warren
- Night Rider, a 2001 novel by W. A. Harbinson written under the Shaun Clarke pseudonym
- Nightrider (DC Comics), a comic book character
- Night Rider, a previous name of Marvel Comics character Phantom Rider

== Film ==
- Night Rider (2022 film), a Sri Lankan film
- The Night Rider (film), a 1932 Western starring Harry Carey
- The Night Riders (1916 film), a film starring Harry Carey
- The Night Riders (1920 film), a British film directed by Alexander Butler
- The Night Riders (1939 film), a film starring John Wayne
- Night Riders (1981 film), a Czechoslovak film
- Nightrider, nickname of character Crawford Montazano in the film Mad Max

== Militant organizations ==
- Night Riders, participants in the Black Patch Tobacco Wars in Kentucky and Tennessee, circa 1904–1909
- Night rider, a member of the Ku Klux Klan

== Music ==
- Jon and the Nightriders, an American surf music band
- Night Rider (band), an American rock band previously known as "Affiance"
- Night Rider (album), 1978 album by Count Basie and Oscar Peterson
- Nightrider (album), 1975 album by The Charlie Daniels Band

=== Songs ===
- "Night Rider" (Elvis Presley song), 1962
- "Nightrider" (song), by Electric Light Orchestra, 1975
- "Night Rider", by George Thorogood from Rockin' My Life Away, 1997
- "Night Rider", by the Hondells, 1964
- "Night Rider", by Joji from Smithereens, 2022
- "Nightrider", by Dokken from Breaking the Chains, 1981
- "Nightrider", by Queensrÿche from Queensrÿche, 1983
- "Night Riders", by Lee Aaron from The Lee Aaron Project, 1982
- "Night Riders", by Major Lazer from Peace Is the Mission, 2015

== Other ==
- NightRider (bus service), in Melbourne, Australia
- Nightrider (chess), a fairy chess piece
- NightRiders, Incorporated, an American designated-driver-for-hire service
- Harley the Nightrider, a professional wrestler from All-Star Wrestling

== See also ==
- Night Ride (disambiguation)
- Knight Rider (disambiguation)
