= National Register of Historic Places listings in Trigg County, Kentucky =

Location of Trigg County in Kentucky

This is a list of the National Register of Historic Places listings in Trigg County, Kentucky.

It is intended to be a complete list of the properties on the National Register of Historic Places in Trigg County, Kentucky, United States. The locations of National Register properties for which the latitude and longitude coordinates are included below, may be seen in a map.

There are 10 properties listed on the National Register in the county.

This National Park Service list is complete through NPS recent listings posted September 11, 2026.

== Current listings ==
	Name on the Register	Image	Date listed	Location	City or town	Description
1	Brick Inn	Brick Inn	April 10, 1980 (#80001672)	Off Kentucky Route 80; 36°48′06″N 87°58′05″W	Canton	
2	Cadiz Downtown Historic District	Cadiz Downtown Historic District	November 14, 1988 (#88002606)	Roughly Main St. from Scott to Franklin Sts. 36°51′44″N 87°50′13″W	Cadiz	
3	Cadiz Main Street Residential District	Cadiz Main Street Residential District	May 16, 1989 (#89000384)	Main St. between Line St. and Scott St. 36°51′53″N 87°49′59″W	Cadiz	
4	Cadiz Masonic Lodge No. 121 F. and A.M.	Cadiz Masonic Lodge No. 121 F. and A.M.	April 17, 1979 (#79001032)	Jefferson and Monroe Sts. 36°51′45″N 87°50′16″W	Cadiz	
5	Center Furnace	Center Furnace	May 12, 1977 (#77000652)	Between Honker and Hematite Lakes, Land Between the Lakes National Recreation Area; 36°54′01″N 88°02′19″W	Golden Pond	
6	Confederate Monument of Cadiz	Confederate Monument of Cadiz	July 17, 1997 (#97000667)	Courthouse Lawn, 0.5 miles east of the junction of Kentucky Routes 139 and 1175; 36°51′42″N 87°50′16″W	Cadiz	
7	Thomas Dawson House		December 1, 1980 (#80001671)	South of Cadiz; 36°43′16″N 87°41′10″W	Cadiz	
8	John McCaughan House		January 8, 1987 (#87000212)	Kentucky Route 276; 36°54′07″N 87°45′22″W	Cadiz	
9	George and Nellie White Smith House	George and Nellie White Smith House	January 10, 2024 (#100009731)	11 Jefferson Street; 36°51′40″N 87°50′23″W	Cadiz	Queen Anne style house built in 1900
10	George Prentice Thomas House	George Prentice Thomas House	April 3, 2026 (#100012866)	14 Jefferson Street; 36°51′40″N 87°50′21″W	Cadiz	

== See also ==
- List of National Historic Landmarks in Kentucky
- National Register of Historic Places listings in Kentucky
