= List of buildings by Frank Pierce Milburn =

The following buildings were designed by architect Frank Pierce Milburn and/or the firm Milburn & Heister.

== Government and legislative buildings ==
- South Carolina State House dome and final completion of the project begun in 1851
- Old Florida Capitol Building, renovation and cupola, 1902
- City Hall and Theater, Darlington, South Carolina
- City Hall and Theater, Columbia, South Carolina, 1905, demolished 1936, Wade Hampton Hotel built on site, demolished 1980s
- City Hall, Rutherfordton, North Carolina, located in the Main Street Historic District
- Design for City Hall, (not built) Charleston, South Carolina
- Design for Governor's Mansion, Columbia, South Carolina (not built).

== Courthouses ==
- Anderson County Courthouse and jail, Anderson, South Carolina, 1897
- Bath County Courthouse, Warm Springs, Virginia, 1908, burned 1912
- Berkeley County Courthouse renovation, Martinsburg, West Virginia
- Buchanan County Courthouse, Grundy, Virginia, 1915
- Buncombe County Courthouse, Asheville, North Carolina (1928)
- Clay County Courthouse, Manchester, Kentucky, 1889
- Columbia County Courthouse, Lake City, Florida, 1905
- Dubois County Courthouse, Jasper, Indiana 1909-1911
- Durham County Courthouse, Durham, North Carolina, 1916
- Forsyth County Courthouse, Winston-Salem, North Carolina, 1893
- Fulton County Courthouse, Fulton, Kentucky
- Gaston County Courthouse, Gastonia, North Carolina
- Glynn County Courthouse, Brunswick, Georgia, 1897
- Grayson County Courthouse, Independence, Virginia, 1908
- Hoke County Courthouse, Raeford, North Carolina, 1900
- Lincoln County Courthouse, Stanford, Kentucky
- Lowndes County Courthouse, Valdosta, Georgia, 1905
- Magoffin County Courthouse, Salyersville, Kentucky (standard design), 1892
- Mecklenburg County Courthouse, Charlotte, North Carolina 1896
- McDowell County Courthouse and jail Welch, West Virginia
- Mineral County Jail, Keyser, West Virginia
- Mingo County Courthouse and jail, Williamson, West Virginia
- Newberry County Courthouse, Newberry, South Carolina, 1908
- Pitt County Courthouse, Greenville, North Carolina, 1910
- Putnam County Courthouse, Winfield, West Virginia
- Smyth County Courthouse Marion, Virginia
- Summers County Courthouse, Hinton, West Virginia (standard design)
- Swain County Courthouse, Bryson City, NC 1909
- Trigg County Courthouse, Cadiz, Kentucky (standard design)
- Tucker County Courthouse and Jail 1898
- Upson County Courthouse, Thomaston, Georgia 1908
- Vance County Courthouse, Henderson, North Carolina (1908 remodeling)
- Wayne County Courthouse, Monticello, Kentucky (standard design)
- Wayne County Courthouse, Goldsboro, North Carolina, 1914
- Wilcox County Courthouse, Abbeville, Georgia 1903
- Wilkes County Courthouse, Washington, Georgia 1903
- Wise County Courthouse, Wise, Virginia, 1896
- Wythe County Courthouse, Wytheville, Virginia.

== Transportation ==
- Union Station, Raleigh, North Carolina, 1891
- Danville station, Southern Railway, Danville, Virginia, 1899
- Southern Railway Station, 14th & Cary Streets, Richmond, Virginia, 1900
- Union Station, 401 Main Street, Columbia, South Carolina, 1902
- Union Station, Savannah, Georgia, 1902 (demolished)
- Union Station, Augusta, Georgia, 1903, demolished 1972, now the site of a post office
- Southern Terminal, Knoxville, Tennessee, 1904
- Southern Railway Station, Charlotte, North Carolina, 1905, demolished 1960s, tower to be replicated in Museum of the New South
- Union Station, Durham, North Carolina, 1905
- Union Depot, 701 Railroad Street NW, Decatur, Alabama, 1905 (attributed to Milburn)
- Salisbury (Amtrak station), Southern Railway, Depot and Liberty Streets, Salisbury, North Carolina, 1908
- Southern Railway Station, 308 Newman Street, Hattiesburg, Mississippi, 1910
- Southern Railway Station, 825 Kemper Street, Lynchburg, Virginia, 1912
- Southern Railway station, Summerville, South Carolina
- Southern Railway station, Aiken, South Carolina.

== Commercial buildings ==
- 8 West Third Street, Winston-Salem, North Carolina (Wachovia Bank Building)
- American Federation of Labor Headquarters, Washington, D.C.
- Capital Club, Raleigh, North Carolina
- Carolina National Bank building, Columbia, South Carolina
- Goff Building, Clarksburg, West Virginia, 1908
- Commercial Building, Gastonia, North Carolina, 1925
- Durham Auditorium (Carolina Theater), Durham, North Carolina, 1926
- Fairmont Hotel, Fairmont, West Virginia, 1916-17
- Hotel Blanche, Lake City, Florida
- Independence Building, Charlotte, North Carolina, demolished (imploded) 1981
- Lansburgh's Department Store, Washington, D.C.
- Mechanics and Farmers Building, Durham, North Carolina, 1921
- Peoples Bank Building, Rocky Mount, North Carolina, 1919
- Piedmont Office Building, Charlotte, NC
- Powhatan Hotel, Washington, D.C. 1911, demolished 1977, replaced by the National Permanent Building
- Professional Building, Raleigh, North Carolina, 1925
- Southern Loan and Trust Company, Raleigh, North Carolina.

== Churches ==
- A.R.P. Church, Newberry, South Carolina, 1908
- Basilica of St. Peter (Columbia, South Carolina)
- First Baptist Church, Winston, NC.

== Museums ==
- Gibbes Museum of Art, Charleston, South Carolina 1905
- Thomson Auditorium, Charleston, S.C., became Charleston Museum 1907, temporary building, burned 1982, portico left standing (p. 12) in Cannon Park.

== Schools ==
- Alumni Hall, University of North Carolina at Chapel Hill
- Bynum Gymnasium, University of North Carolina, Chapel Hill
- Dormitory, North Carolina School for the Blind and Deaf (now re-located and known as the Governor Morehead School), Raleigh, North Carolina (Old Health Building) 1898 only remaining building
- East Dormitory, Winthrop College (University)
- George Peabody Hall, University of North Carolina at Chapel Hill
- Graded school building, Charlotte, NC
- Holland Hall, Newberry College, Newberry, South Carolina
- President's House, University of North Carolina at Chapel Hill 1906-7 (nearly all buildings on UNC campus 1898-1914)
- Slater College, Columbia Heights
- Alumni Hall, Wofford College.

== Residences ==
- Captain Owen Daly Residence, Columbia, South Carolina
- E.H. Walker Residence, Charlotte, North Carolina
- George Fitzsimmons residence, Charlotte, North Carolina
- Heathcote, residence of B.D. Heath, Charlotte, North Carolina
- Oakhurst (Greensboro, North Carolina) on the grounds of the Oak Ridge Military Academy 1896
- O'Donnell House, Sumter, South Carolina
- P.H. Haynes Residence, Winston-Salem, North Carolina
- Prof. M.H. Holt Residence, Oak Ridge, North Carolina
- W. Hunt Harris residence, Key West, Florida
- Yancey Milburn House, Durham, North Carolina early 1920s, designed by Thomas Yancey Milburn.
