= Kentucky Route 272 =

State highway in Kentucky, United States

Kentucky Route 272
- KY 272 highlighted in red

Route information
- Maintained by KYTC
- Length: 22.9 mi (36.9 km)
- Existed: 1929–present

Major junctions
- West end: US 68 / KY 80 southwest of Cadiz
- KY 139 south of Cadiz; KY 117 in Julien; KY 164 west of Hopkinsville US 68 Byp. west of Hopkinsville; KY 380 in Hopkinsville
- East end: KY 107 in Hopkinsville

Location
- Country: United States
- State: Kentucky
- Counties: Trigg, Christian

Highway system
- Kentucky State Highway System; Interstate; US; State; Parkways
← KY 271	→ KY 273

Kentucky Route 272 (KY 272) is a 22.9-mile-long (36.9 km) state highway in the U.S. state of Kentucky. The highway connects rural areas of Trigg and Christian counties with Hopkinsville.

== Route description ==
=== Trigg County ===
KY 272 begins at an intersection with US 68/KY 80 (Canton Road) southwest of Cadiz, within Trigg County. It travels to the east and immediately intersects the northern terminus of KY 1062 (Maple Grove Road). It crosses over Caney Creek and curves to the southeast before curving to the northeast. It intersects the southern terminus of KY 1175 (Old Dover Road). The highway intersects KY 139 (S Road) and then crosses over Burge Creek. It begins curving to the southeast and crosses over Little River. KY 272 heads to the southeast and intersects the northern terminus of KY 1253 (Hardy Road). It curves to the east-southeast and intersects KY 1585 (Caledonia Pee Dee Road/Montgomery Road). It crosses over Boyd Lake Branch and travels through Caledonia. The highway heads to the northeast and enters Christian County.

=== Christian County ===
KY 272 crosses over Interstate 24 (I-24) and curves to the east-southeast to an intersection with KY 117 (Gracey Herndon Road) in Julien. It heads to the east-northeast and intersects the eastern terminus of KY 164 (Newstead Road). The highway crosses over Riverside Creek and intersects US 68 Byp. (Eagle Way). A short distance later, it enters Hopkinsville. It crosses over the North Fork Little River. It intersects the western terminus of KY 380 (Country Club Lane). It then intersects the southern terminus of KY 1007 (North Drive). KY 272 curves to the northeast and passes Jennie Stuart Medical Center. It curves to the southeast and meets its eastern terminus, an intersection with KY 107 (South Virginia Street/South Main Street) on one-way pairs.

== Major intersections ==
County	Location	mi	km	Destinations	Notes
Trigg		0.0	0.0	US 68 / KY 80 (Canton Road) – Hopkinsville	Western terminus
Trigg		0.0	0.0	KY 1062 south (Maple Grove Road)	Northern terminus of KY 1062
Trigg		1.4	2.3	KY 1175 north (Old Dover Road)	Southern terminus of KY 1175
Trigg		3.3	5.3	KY 139 (S Road)	
Trigg		8.7	14.0	KY 1253 south (Hardy Road)	Northern terminus of KY 1253
Trigg		10.1	16.3	KY 1585 (Caledonia Pee Dee Road/Montgomery Road)	
Christian	Julien	13.9	22.4	KY 117 (Gracey Herndon Road)	
Christian		18.7	30.1	KY 164 west (Newstead Road)	Eastern terminus of KY 164
Christian		19.2	30.9	US 68 Byp. (Eagle Way)	
Christian	Hopkinsville	21.3	34.3	KY 380 east (Country Club Lane)	Western terminus of KY 380
Christian	Hopkinsville	22.0	35.4	KY 1007 north (North Drive)	Southern terminus of KY 1007
Christian	Hopkinsville	22.8	36.7	KY 107 south (South Main Street)	Southbound lanes of KY 107 on one-way pairs
Christian	Hopkinsville	22.9	36.9	KY 107 north (South Virginia Street)	Eastern terminus; northbound lanes of KY 107 on one-way pairs
1.000 mi = 1.609 km; 1.000 km = 0.621 mi
