= Kentucky Route 164 =

State highway in Kentucky, United States

Kentucky Route 164

Route information
- Maintained by KYTC
- Length: 36.247 mi (58.334 km)

Major junctions
- West end: US 68 / KY 80 / Old Canton Road Connector in Canton
- East end: KY 272 near Hopkinsville

Location
- Country: United States
- State: Kentucky
- Counties: Trigg, Christian

Highway system
- Kentucky State Highway System; Interstate; US; State; Parkways
← KY 163	→ I-165

Kentucky Route 164 (KY 164) is a 36.247-mile-long (58.334 km) state highway in western Kentucky.

== Route description ==
KY 164 begins its run on Linton Road from U.S. Route 68 (US 68, co-signed with KY 80) and Old Canton Road Connector in the western Trigg County community of Canton. It parallels the eastern shores of Lake Barkley while traversing the small communities of Donaldson and Linton. It turns eastward to cross KY 139 and becomes Roaring Springs Road afterwards.

After traversing the town of Roaring Springs, and also paralleling the northwestern boundary of the Fort Campbell Military Reservation, KY 164 turns northeastward before entering Christian County.

KY 164, locally known as Newstead Road, ends at the junction with KY 272 west of Hopkinsville.

== History ==
KY 164 originally ran from the Tennessee State line northeast of the now-extinct town of Model, and entered the community of Linton via a ferry crossing of the Cumberland River, and then joined its present-day alignment from Linton to near Hopkinsville. Ferry service was discontinued after the river was impounded to become Lake Barkley in the early 1960s, and KY 164 was rerouted onto Linton Road to Canton. The road west of the ferry crossing site is now Forest Road 204 within the Land Between the Lakes National Recreation Area.

== Major intersections ==
County	Location	mi	km	Destinations	Notes
Trigg	Canton	0.000	0.000	US 68 (Canton Road) / KY 80 / Old Canton Road Connector	Western terminus; continues beyond US 68/KY 80 as Old Canton Road Connector
Trigg		1.207	1.942	KY 1891 south (Lock East Road)	Northern terminus of KY 1891
Trigg		4.764	7.667	KY 807 east (Donaldson Creek Road) / Donaldson Creek Road	Western terminus of KY 807
Trigg		18.049	29.047	KY 139 (S Road)	
Trigg		23.403	37.663	KY 525 north (New Hope Road)	Southern terminus of KY 525
Christian		27.194	43.765	KY 287 south (Binns Mill Road)	Northern terminus of KY 287
Christian		27.600	44.418	KY 695 east (Cox Mill Road)	Western terminus of KY 695
Christian		30.672	49.362	KY 117 (Gracey-Herndon Road)	
Christian		36.247	58.334	KY 272 (Julien Road / Canton Pike)	Eastern terminus
1.000 mi = 1.609 km; 1.000 km = 0.621 mi
