= Clarksville metropolitan area =

Clarksville Area
- Metropolitan Statistical Area
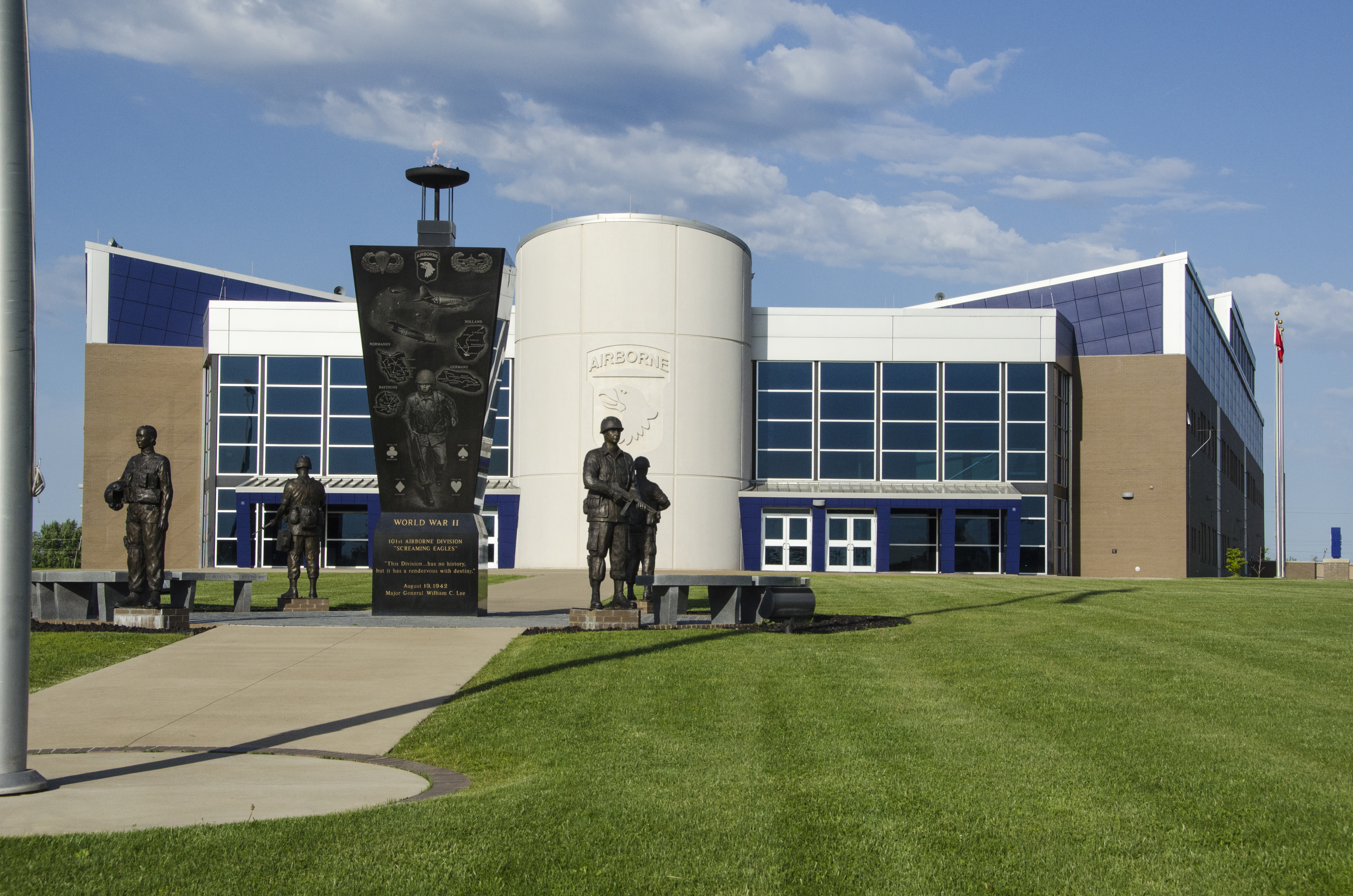
- Command and Control Facility for 101st Airborne Division, Fort Campbell
Map of Clarksville, TN–KY MSA
Clarksville, TN–KY MSA
City of Clarksville, TN
City of Hopkinsville, KY
Todd County, KY
- Country: United States
- State: Tennessee; Kentucky
- Largest city: Clarksville, TN
- Other cities: Hopkinsville, KY; Oak Grove, KY; Fort Campbell North, KY; Dover, TN

Area
  - Total: 2,242 sq mi (5,810 km^{2})

Population (2021)
  - Total: 329,864
  - Rank: 159th (2020) in the U.S.

GDP
  - Total: $16.209 billion (2022)
- Time zone: UTC−6 (CDT)
  - Summer (DST): UTC−5

The Clarksville Metropolitan Statistical Area is defined by the United States Census Bureau as an area consisting of four counties – two (Montgomery and Stewart) in Tennessee and two (Christian and Trigg) in Kentucky – anchored by the city of Clarksville, Tennessee. The 2021 estimate placed the population at 329,864. As of 2020, the Clarksville Metropolitan Statistical Area was the 159th largest MSA in the United States.

Prior to 2003, the area was officially known as the Clarksville-Hopkinsville Metropolitan Statistical Area and included only Montgomery and Christian counties. In 2003, Hopkinsville was removed from the official name as it was no longer considered a principal city. That year, Stewart and Trigg counties were also added to the MSA.

== Counties ==
County	State	Seat	2025 estimate	2020 census	Change	Area	Density
Montgomery	Tennessee	Clarksville	249,935	220,069	+13.57%	544 sq mi (1,410 km^{2})	459/sq mi (177/km^{2})
Christian	Kentucky	Hopkinsville	72,748	70,115	+3.76%	724 sq mi (1,880 km^{2})	97/sq mi (37/km^{2})
Trigg	Kentucky	Cadiz	14,512	14,061	+3.21%	481 sq mi (1,250 km^{2})	30/sq mi (12/km^{2})
Stewart	Tennessee	Dover	14,439	13,657	+5.73%	493 sq mi (1,280 km^{2})	29/sq mi (11/km^{2})
Total			349,001	320,535	+8.88%	2,242 sq mi (5,810 km^{2})	156/sq mi (60/km^{2})

== Communities ==
=== Places with more than 100,000 inhabitants ===
- Clarksville, Tennessee (Principal city)

=== Places with 25,000 to 50,000 inhabitants ===
- Hopkinsville, Kentucky

=== Places with 5,000 to 25,000 inhabitants ===
- Fort Campbell North, Kentucky (census-designated place)
- Oak Grove, Kentucky

=== Places with 1,000 to 5,000 inhabitants ===
- Cadiz, Kentucky
- Dover, Tennessee
- Tennessee Ridge, Tennessee (partial)

=== Places with fewer than 1,000 inhabitants ===
- Crofton, Kentucky
- Cumberland City, Tennessee
- LaFayette, Kentucky
- Pembroke, Kentucky

=== Unincorporated places ===
- Bumpus Mills, Tennessee
- Canton, Kentucky
- Cerulean, Kentucky (census-designated place)
- Cunningham, Tennessee
- Dotsonville, Tennessee
- Excell, Tennessee
- Fairview, Kentucky (census-designated place)
- Fearsville, Kentucky
- Fredonia, Tennessee
- Gracey, Kentucky (census-designated place)
- Herndon, Kentucky
- Kelly, Kentucky
- Needmore, Tennessee
- Oakridge, Tennessee
- Oakwood, Tennessee
- Orgains Crossroads, Tennessee
- Palmyra, Tennessee
- Port Royal, Tennessee
- Rockcastle, Kentucky
- Rossview, Tennessee
- Sango, Tennessee
- Southside, Tennessee
- Shiloh, Montgomery County, Tennessee
- Sailors Rest, Tennessee
- Tarsus, Tennessee
- Wallonia, Kentucky
- Woodlawn, Tennessee

== Demographics ==
Race	Percentage
White	62%
Black	19%
Asian	2%
Two or more	6%
Hispanic (of any race)	10%

As of the census of 2020, there were 336,861 people, 129,593 households, and 110,154 families residing within the MSA. The racial makeup of the MSA was 62% White, 19% African American, 2% Asian, and 6% from two or more races. Hispanic or Latino of any race were 10% of the population.

The median income for a household in the MSA was $67,082. The per capita income for the MSA was $32,639.

== See also ==
- Tennessee census statistical areas
- Kentucky census statistical areas
