= Cerulean, Kentucky =

Human settlement in Kentucky, United States of America

Cerulean
- Census-designated place
- Location within the state of Kentucky Cerulean (the United States)
- Coordinates: 36°57′34″N 87°42′36″W
- Country: United States
- State: Kentucky
- County: Trigg

Area
  - Total: 2.56 sq mi (6.64 km^{2})
  - Land: 2.56 sq mi (6.62 km^{2})
  - Water: 0.0077 sq mi (0.02 km^{2})
- Elevation: 512 ft (156 m)

Population (2020)
  - Total: 303
  - Density: 119/sq mi (45.8/km^{2})
- Time zone: UTC-6 (Central (CST))
  - Summer (DST): UTC-5 (CST)
- ZIP codes: 42215
- FIPS code: 21-14068
- GNIS feature ID

Cerulean is a census-designated place and unincorporated community in Trigg and Christian counties, Kentucky, United States. At one time, it was a city, incorporated as Cerulean Springs. It lies along Kentucky Routes 124 and 126 northeast of the city of Cadiz, the county seat of Trigg County. Its elevation is 512 feet (156 m), and it is located at 36°57′34″N 87°42′36″W (36.9594919, -87.7100107). It has a post office with the ZIP code 42215. As of the 2020 census, Cerulean had a population of 303.

The community is part of the Clarksville, TN–KY Metropolitan Statistical Area.

== Geography ==
The majority of Cerulean is located in Trigg County with a small portion in Christian County.

== Demographics ==
Historical population
Census	Pop.	Note	%±
2010	314		—
2020	303		−3.5%
U.S. Decennial Census

In 2010, 314 people lived within Cerulean's census designated place, which encompasses but does not include all those living within the greater Cerulean zip code.

=== 2020 census ===
As of the 2020 census, there were 303 people, 131 housing units, and 214 families residing in the CDP. There were 194 White people, 87 African Americans, 1 Native American, 0 Asians, 1 person from some other race, and 20 people from two or more races. 3 people had Hispanic or Latino origin.

The median age was 48.9 years old. 20.6% of the population were older than 65, with 18.8% being between the ages of 65 and 74, and 1.7% being between the ages of 75 and 84. 1.1% of the population was foreign born.

The median household income was $49,537, with families having $71,019. 32.1% of the population were in poverty.

== History ==
Cerulean was first settled around 1790, and later took its first name, Cerulean Springs, from the color of water from a local spring. The spring's color was changed to cerulean by the New Madrid earthquake of 1811. The town itself was incorporated in 1822 and took the shorter name of Cerulean in 1894.

The town is best known for its 19th-century health resort, the Cerulean Springs Hotel, which earned a famed reputation throughout the Upper South after its initial 1817 opening. According to The Kentucky Atlas, "the resort business declined during the early twentieth century and the resort hotel burned in 1925. There was a rock quarry operating from 1895 until 1953 when it flooded. Much of the town burned in 1971."

US poet laureate Robert Penn Warren spent his summers in Cerulean growing up as a child, staying with his maternal grandparents who lived there.

Cerulean also served as point of greatest eclipse for the solar eclipse of August 21, 2017.

== Schools ==
Most students in Cerulean currently attend Trigg County Public Schools in Cadiz. Those who live on the Christian County side attend Christian County Public Schools in Hopkinsville, Kentucky.

Before desegregation, Black children living in the area attended Cerulean Colored School, one of two segregated schools in Trigg County.
