= Kentucky Route 380 =

State highway in Kentucky, United States

Kentucky Route 380
- KY 380 highlighted in red

Route information
- Maintained by KYTC
- Length: 3.613 mi (5.815 km)

Major junctions
- West end: KY 272 in Hopkinsville
- KY 695 in Hopkinsville; KY 107 in Hopkinsville; US 41 Alt. in Hopkinsville
- East end: US 41 / KY 109 in Hopkinsville

Location
- Country: United States
- State: Kentucky
- Counties: Christian

Highway system
- Kentucky State Highway System; Interstate; US; State; Parkways
← KY 379	→ KY 381

Kentucky Route 380 (KY 380) is a 3.613-mile-long (5.815 km) state highway in the U.S. state of Kentucky. The highway connects different highways entirely within Hopkinsville, which is located in Christian County.

== Route description ==
KY 380 begins at an intersection with KY 272 (Canton Street) in the west-central part of Hopkinsville, within Christian County, where the roadway continues as Navaho Trail. It travels to the south-southwest and curves to the southeast. It intersects KY 695 (Cox Mill Road) and curves to the east-southeast. It intersects KY 107 (Lafayette Road / South Virginia Street). It travels along the northern edge of Hopkinsville Country Club golf course and curves to the east. It intersects U.S. Route 41 Alternate (US 41 Alt.; Fort Campbell Boulevard). The two highways travel concurrently to the south-southeast. They cross over the South Fork Little River and split. KY 380 travels to the northeast and curves to the north-northeast. It crosses over some railroad tracks of CSX and curves back to the northeast. It then meets its eastern terminus, an intersection with US 41/KY 109 (East 9th Street). Here, the roadway continues as Trail of Tears Drive.

== Major intersections ==
The entire route is in Hopkinsville, Christian County.

mi	km	Destinations	Notes
0.000	0.000	KY 272 (Canton Street)	Western terminus
0.977	1.572	KY 695 (Cox Mill Road)	
1.805	2.905	KY 107 (Lafayette Road / South Virginia Street)	
2.652	4.268	US 41 Alt. north (Fort Campbell Boulevard)	Western end of US 41 Alt. concurrency
2.652	4.268	US 41 Alt. south (Fort Campbell Boulevard)	Eastern end of US 41 Alt. concurrency
3.613	5.815	US 41 / KY 109 (East 9th Street) – Guthrie, Nortonville, Oak Grove, Dawson Springs	Eastern terminus
1.000 mi = 1.609 km; 1.000 km = 0.621 mi: Concurrency terminus
