= The Cadiz Record =

- Type: Weekly newspaper
- Founded: December 31, 1880
- Headquarters: 58 Nunn Blvd Cadiz, KY 42211
- Website: kentuckynewera.com/cadiz_record

The Cadiz Record is a weekly newspaper (published on Wednesdays) in Cadiz, Kentucky (Trigg County). It has fewer than 5,000 subscribers.

== History ==
It started publishing December 31, 1880 as the Kentucky Telephone. By 1899, the paper had a circulation of 1,375 copies.

In 1898, the newspaper was purchased by Henry R. Lawrence in partnership with George H. Pike. Later that year, there was a fire at the building. After purchasing new printing equipment, the name of the newspaper was changed to the Cadiz Record.

Under the direction of Lawrence, the newspaper was a democratic publication. For example, he used it as a platform to fight for justice in the Black Patch Tobacco Wars.
