= Oakhurst =

Oakhurst may refer to:

== Places ==
=== Australia ===
- Oakhurst, New South Wales, a suburb in Sydney
- Oakhurst, Queensland, in the Fraser Coast Region

=== United States ===
- Oakhurst, California, in the Sierra foothills in Madera County
- Oakhurst (Emelle, Alabama), a NRHP in Emelle, Alabama
- Oakhurst, Georgia
- Oakhurst, New Jersey
- Oakhurst (Greensboro, North Carolina), a NRHP-listed house
- Oakhurst, Michigan
- Oakhurst, Oklahoma
- Oakhurst, Texas

== Other ==
- Oakhurst (band), a bluegrass band from Denver, Colorado
- Oakhurst Dairy
- Oakhurst Primary School, in South Africa
