= Fort Campbell North, Kentucky =

Census-designated place in Kentucky, United States

- Census-designated place
- Location within the state of Kentucky
- Coordinates: 36°39′13″N 87°27′35″W
- Country: United States
- State: Kentucky
- County: Christian

Area
  - Total: 8.53 sq mi (22.10 km^{2})
  - Land: 8.53 sq mi (22.10 km^{2})
  - Water: 0 sq mi (0.00 km^{2})

Population (2020)
  - Total: 12,825
  - Density: 1,503.2/sq mi (580.39/km^{2})
- Time zone: UTC-6 (Central (CST))
  - Summer (DST): UTC-5 (CDT)
- FIPS code: 21-28486

Fort Campbell North is a census-designated place (CDP) in Christian County, Kentucky, United States. It contains most of the housing for the Fort Campbell Army base within the Kentucky portion of the base. The population was 12,825 as of the 2020 census, down from 13,685 in the 2010 census.

Fort Campbell North is part of the Clarksville, Tennessee metropolitan area.

== Geography ==
Fort Campbell North is located along the southern border of Christian County at 36°39′13″N 87°27′35″W (36.653631, -87.459716). The southern border is also the Tennessee state line, and the Kentucky city of Oak Grove lies along the CDP's eastern border, which follows Fort Campbell Boulevard (US Route 41A).

According to the United States Census Bureau, the CDP has a total area of 5.0 square miles (13.0 km^{2}), all land.

== Demographics ==
Historical population
Census	Pop.	Note	%±
2000	14,338		—
2010	13,685		−4.6%
2020	12,825		−6.3%
U.S. Decennial Census

=== 2020 census ===
As of the 2020 census, Fort Campbell North had a population of 12,825. The population density was 1,503.2 inhabitants per square mile, compared to 2,717.6 inhabitants per square mile in 2010. There were 2,565 families residing in the CDP.

The median age was 22.2 years. 28.7% of residents were under the age of 18 and 0.2% of residents were 65 years of age or older. For every 100 females there were 172.2 males, and for every 100 females age 18 and over there were 215.1 males age 18 and over.

100.0% of residents lived in urban areas, while 0.0% lived in rural areas.

There were 2,708 households in Fort Campbell North, of which 65.0% had children under the age of 18 living in them. Of all households, 81.1% were married-couple households, 12.4% were households with a male householder and no spouse or partner present, and 5.8% were households with a female householder and no spouse or partner present. About 11.3% of all households were made up of individuals and 0.3% had someone living alone who was 65 years of age or older.

There were 2,868 housing units, of which 5.6% were vacant. The homeowner vacancy rate was 0.0% and the rental vacancy rate was 3.9%.

Racial composition as of the 2020 census
Race	Number	Percent
White	7,957	62.0%
Black or African American	1,965	15.3%
American Indian and Alaska Native	95	0.7%
Asian	357	2.8%
Native Hawaiian and Other Pacific Islander	168	1.3%
Some other race	918	7.2%
Two or more races	1,365	10.6%
Hispanic or Latino (of any race)	2,574	20.1%

=== 2000 census ===
As of the census of 2000, there were 14,338 people, 2,842 households, and 2,768 families residing in the CDP. The population density was 3,614.2 inhabitants per square mile (1,395.5/km^{2}). There were 2,967 housing units at an average density of 747.9 per square mile (288.8/km^{2}). The racial makeup was 58.6% White, 25.8% Black or African American, 1.0% Native American, 1.7% Asian, 1.0% Pacific Islander, 7.1% from other races, and 4.8% from two or more races. Hispanics or Latinos of any race were 13.8% of the population.

There were 2,842 households, out of which 87.1% had children under the age of 18 living with them, 88.6% were married couples living together, 7.3% had a female householder with no husband present, and 2.6% were non-families. 2.4% of all households were made up of individuals, none of whom were 65 years of age or older. The average household size was 3.78 and the average family size was 3.81.

The age distribution was 35.6% under the age of 18, 31.1% from 18 to 24, 32.4% from 25 to 44, and 0.8% from 45 to 64. The median age was 21 years. For every 100 females, there were 157.6 males. For every 100 females age 18 and over, there were 205.6 males.

The median income for a household in the CDP was $26,755, and the median income for a family was $26,632. Males had a median income of $19,846 versus $18,478 for females. The per capita income for the CDP was $10,319. About 11.2% of families and 13.1% of the population were below the poverty line, including 15.9% of those under the age of 18.

=== Demographic estimates ===
The ancestry was 10.4% German, 6.2% Sub-Saharan African, 5.2% Irish, 3.2% Italian, 2.8% English, 1.7% Polish, 1.6% Scottish, 1.2% Norwegian, and 1.2% French.

16.3% of the population were under the age of 5 and 36.6% of the population were female. 24.8% of the population spoke a language other than English at home, with 15.6% speaking Spanish, 3.8% speaking other indo-European languages, 3.0% speaking Asian languages, and 2.3% speaking other languages. 7.8% of the population were foreign born.

=== Income and poverty ===
The median household income was $45,017, with families at $44,167, and married couples at $47,357. The per capita income was $20,072. 9.8% of the population were in poverty.

== Climate ==
The climate in this area is characterized by hot, humid summers and generally mild to cool winters. According to the Köppen Climate Classification system, Fort Campbell North has a humid subtropical climate, abbreviated "Cfa" on climate maps.
