= Thomas Dawson House =

- U.S. National Register of Historic Places
- Location within Kentucky Location within the United States
- Nearest city: Cadiz, Kentucky
- Coordinates: 36°43′16″N 87°41′10″W
- Area: 3 acres (1.2 ha)
- Built: 1816-17
- NRHP reference No.: 80001671
- Added to NRHP: December 1, 1980

The Thomas Dawson House, in Trigg County, Kentucky about 12 miles (19 km) south of Cadiz, was built in 1816–17. It was listed on the National Register of Historic Places in 1980.

It is a one-and-a-half-story hall-parlor plan brick house, under renovation in 1980.

The listing also included a family cemetery about 400 feet (120 m) to the south.
