= Columbia County Courthouse (Florida) =

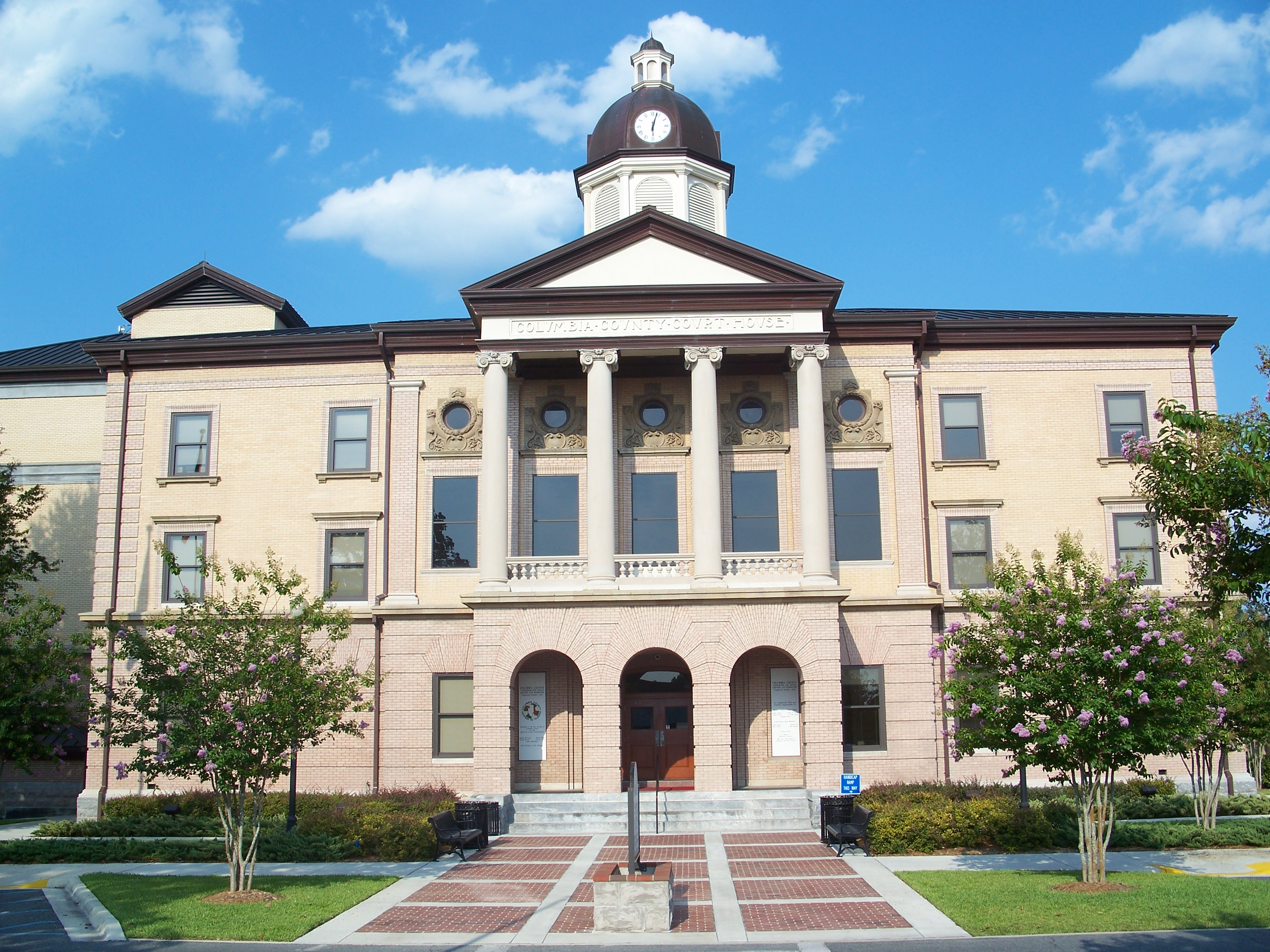
- Columbia County Courthouse
- Interactive map of the Columbia County Courthouse area

General information
- Architectural style: Classical Revival
- Location: 173 NE Hernando Ave., Lake City, Florida, United States
- Coordinates: 30.190334°N 82.635801°W
- Construction started: 1905
- Completed: 1905
- Client: Columbia County

Design and construction
- Architect: Frank Pierce Milburn
- Engineer: Builder:

The Columbia County Courthouse, built in 1905, is an historic courthouse building located at 173 NE Hernando Avenue in Lake City, Florida. It was designed by architect Frank Pierce Milburn in the Classical Revival style of architecture. It was built with a dome and cupola, which were removed before 1989, but were restored in 2003 during a major renovation and expansion of the courthouse. In 1989, the Columbia County Courthouse was listed in A Guide to Florida's Historic Architecture, published by the University of Florida Press.

The Columbia County Courthouse is a contributing property in the Lake City Historic Commercial District.

== See also ==
- List of buildings by Frank Pierce Milburn
