= Kentucky Route 1007 =

State highway in Kentucky, United States

Kentucky Route 1007
- North Drive, Sanderson Drive
- KY 1007 highlighted in red

Route information
- Maintained by KYTC
- Length: 2.919 mi (4.698 km)

Major junctions
- South end: KY 272 / Camilla Drive in Hopkinsville
- US 68 / KY 109 in Hopkinsville
- North end: US 41 in Hopkinsville

Location
- Country: United States
- State: Kentucky
- Counties: Christian

Highway system
- Kentucky State Highway System; Interstate; US; State; Parkways
← KY 1006	→ KY 1008

Kentucky Route 1007 (KY 1007) is an 2.919-mile (4.698 km) long state highway in the U.S. state of Kentucky. The route is located entirely within Hopkinsville and Christian County. The highway runs from KY 272 and Camilla Drive on the southwestern side of Hopkinsville to US Route 41 (US 41) north of downtown.

== Route description ==
The highway begins at KY 272 west-southwest of downtown Hopkinsville. The road continues through the intersection as Camilla Drive. For the vast majority of its route, KY 1007 is known locally as North Drive and runs south–north on the western side of Hopkinsville, serving a mix of residential and industrial areas. Overall, the highway serves as a sort of local inner bypass on the west side of town. Near its northern terminus, the route turns onto Sanderson Drive before shortly terminating at US 41.

== Major intersections ==
The entire route is in Hopkinsville, Christian County.

mi	km	Destinations	Notes
0.000	0.000	KY 272 (Canton Street); Camilla Drive	Southern terminus; continues as Camilla Drive beyond KY 272
0.785	1.263	US 68 / KY 109 (West Seventh Street)	
2.919	4.698	US 41 (North Main Street)	Northern terminus
1.000 mi = 1.609 km; 1.000 km = 0.621 mi
