= Cadiz Masonic Lodge No. 121 F. and A.M. =

- U.S. National Register of Historic Places
- U.S. Historic district – Contributing property
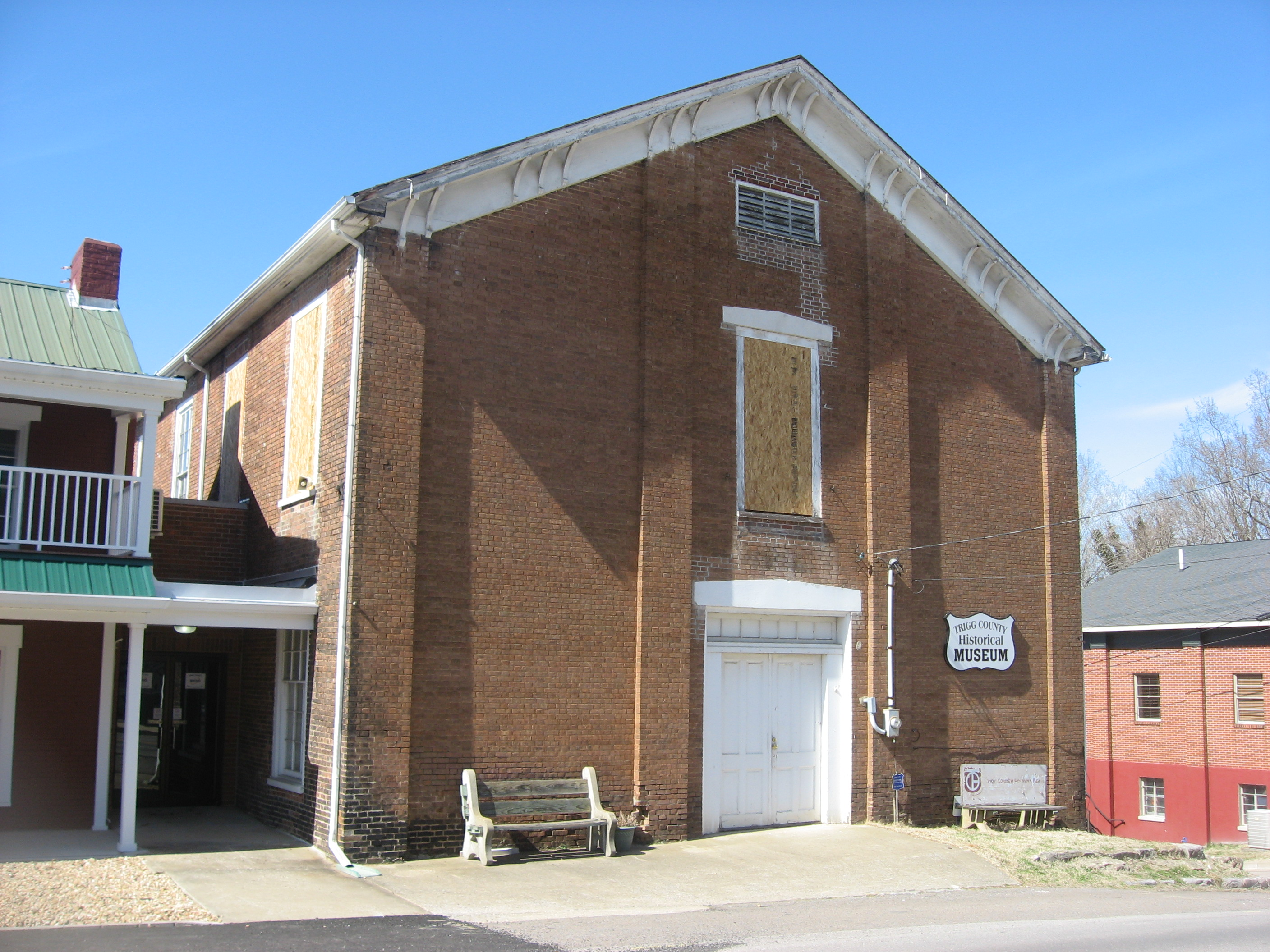
- Photo in 2014

- Location within Kentucky Location within the United States
- Location: Jefferson and Monroe Sts., Cadiz, Kentucky
- Coordinates: 36°51′45″N 87°50′16″W
- Area: 0.2 acres (0.081 ha)
- Built: c.1854
- Part of: Cadiz Downtown Historic District (ID88002606)
- NRHP reference No.: 79001032

Significant dates
- Added to NRHP: April 17, 1979
- Designated CP: November 14, 1988

The Cadiz Masonic Lodge No. 121 F. and A.M., at Jefferson and Monroe Sts. in Cadiz, Kentucky, was built around 1854. It was listed on the National Register of Historic Places in 1979.

It is a rectangular brick building on an ashlar stone foundation.

In 1998 the building was included in the Cadiz Downtown Historic District, and was described as an "example of Greek Revival at its simplest."

In 2014 it was serving as Trigg County Historical Museum.
