= Cornbread Nation 1 =

2002 essay collection by John Egerton

Cornbread Nation 1: the Best of Southern Food Writing is an essay collection edited by John Egerton, published by University of North Carolina Press in October 2002.

It includes about 48 pieces of writing about Southern cuisine. Authors include Roy Blount Jr. and Nikki Giovanni.

== Contents ==
Some essays have more of a scholarly character, while some others are what Wilda Williams of Library Journal characterizes as ones that "read like a Southern Living puff piece." Mark Knoblauch of Booklist stated that "fascinating minutiae" are the focus of the former ones.

Essays include:

- One on Craig Claiborne by James Villas

== Reception ==
Kirkus Reviews stated that the book is (metaphorically) "A delicious feast".

Williams stated that overall this is, metaphorically, "a tasty collection".
