= Kentucky Route 695 =

State highway in Kentucky, United States

Kentucky Route 695
- KY 695 highlighted in red

Route information
- Maintained by KYTC
- Length: 12.829 mi (20.646 km)
- Existed: 1987–present

Major junctions
- West end: KY 164 near Peedee
- US 68 Byp. near Hopkinsville
- East end: KY 107 south in Hopkinsville

Location
- Country: United States
- State: Kentucky
- Counties: Christian

Highway system
- Kentucky State Highway System; Interstate; US; State; Parkways
| ← KY 693 | → KY 696 |

Kentucky Route 695 (KY 695) is a 12.829-mile-long (20.646 km) state highway in southwestern Christian County, Kentucky, that runs from KY 164 northeast of Peedee to the southbound lanes of KY 107 in downtown Hopkinsville via Church Hill.

== Major intersections ==
The entire route is in Christian County.

| Location | mi | km | Destinations | Notes |
|---|---|---|---|---|
| | 0.000 | 0.000 | KY 164 (Newstead Road) | Western terminus |
| | 3.513 | 5.654 | KY 117 (Gracey-Herndon Road) | |
| | 7.264 | 11.690 | KY 345 south (Huffman Mill Road) | Northern terminus of KY 345 |
| | 10.066 | 16.200 | US 68 Byp. (Eagle Way) | |
| Hopkinsville | 11.455 | 18.435 | KY 380 (Country Club Lane) | |
| Hopkinsville | 12.829 | 20.646 | KY 107 south (East 18th Street) | Eastern terminus; no direct access from KY 695 to KY 107 north or from KY 107 north to KY 695 |
1.000 mi = 1.609 km; 1.000 km = 0.621 mi: Incomplete access
