= Cadiz Main Street Residential District =

Historic district in Kentucky, United States

- U.S. National Register of Historic Places
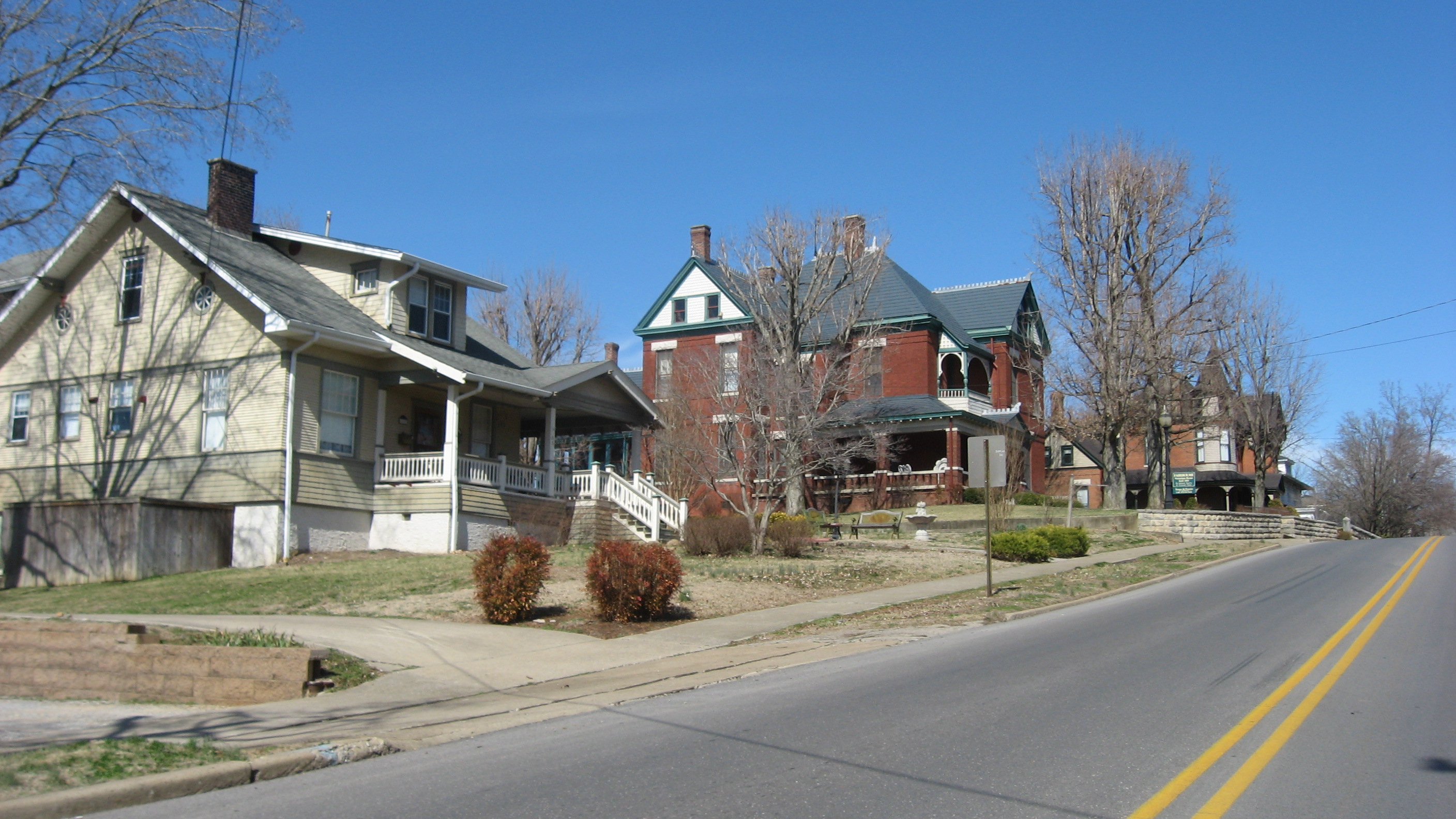

- Location within Kentucky Location within the United States
- Location: Main St., between Line St. and Scott St., Cadiz, Kentucky
- Coordinates: 36°51′53″N 87°49′59″W
- Area: 7.1 acres (2.9 ha)
- Built: 1880
- Architectural style: Late 19th And 20th Century Revivals, Italianate, Queen Anne
- NRHP reference No.: 89000384
- Added to NRHP: May 16, 1989

The Cadiz Main Street Residential District is a 7.1 acres (2.9 ha) historic district in Cadiz, Kentucky which was listed on the National Register of Historic Places in 1989. It runs along Main St., between Line St. and Scott St., and included 32 contributing buildings.

It consists of houses, related outbuildings, and one church: the 1903 Gothic Revival-style Cadiz Baptist Church.

The Cadiz Downtown Historic District, listed on the National Register in 1988 is along Main St. directly to its west.
