= Linton, Kentucky =

Unincorporated community in Kentucky, United States

Linton
- Unincorporated community
- Location within the state of Kentucky Linton (the United States)
- Coordinates: 36°41′12″N 87°55′07″W
- Country: United States
- State: Kentucky
- County: Trigg
- First settled: 1798
- Incorporated as a town: April 4, 1861
- Unincorporated as a town: Unknown
- Elevation: 538 ft (164 m)
- Time zone: UTC-6 (Central (CST))
  - Summer (DST): UTC-5 (CST)
- GNIS feature ID: 496592

Linton is an unincorporated community in Trigg County, Kentucky, United States. It was also known as Shipsport.

== History ==
=== Pre-European period ===
The Chickasaw Peoples inhabited the area, and technically continued to administrate it up until 1818, after a purchase of land by the US Government.

=== Early period ===
The very first Europeans to settle in the community were the Westers family, originally from North Carolina, who first settled the area in 1798. Soon after the arrival of the Westers family, a man named Abel Olive, an in-law of the family, established Olive's Landing, which soon became the name used for the settlement in its early period.

In 1805, the local Dry Creek Church was constructed. Today it is still standing.

Despite arriving soon after the Westers Family, Olive's Landing was only made functional in 1820 circa.

After the year 1830, steamboats started to pass by in the area and the Landing was renamed to "Shipsport". This was about the time when the community started to develop its own local economy, with the emergence of a general store by 1830 and the Stacker Iron Furnace in 1845 (which closed in 1856).

=== Contemporary period ===
Linton became incorporated April 4, 1861, and even got a post office starting from May 20, 1864, which functioned thanks to the use of steamboats delivering mail up until June 30, 1934, and later on by land up until April 16, 1941, when the post office was officially discontinued, never to be opened again.

Up until now the community had relied on the extraction of local iron reserves, however by the 1860s, this had changed, with the community turning to local extraction of timber, up until local exhaustion of such resource in the 1930s. The final blow to the industry however was in 1947, when a fire destroyed local infrastructures.

The town hosted local masonic lodges, being one of the first places to do so in the area.

On an unknown date, the community was unincorporated for unclear reasonings.

== Geography ==
Linton is located along Kentucky Route 164 along the eastern shore of Lake Barkley (Cumberland River) in southwestern Trigg County. The community is located about a mile north of the Tennessee state line.
