= John Egerton (journalist) =

American writer (1935–2013)

John Egerton (June 14, 1935 — November 21, 2013) was an American journalist and author known for his writing on the civil rights movement, Southern food, history of the South, and Southern culture.

Egerton wrote or edited approximately twenty non-fiction books and one "contemporary fable". He also contributed chapters to numerous other volumes and wrote scores of articles in newspapers and magazines. Egerton was a participant and writer for many projects and conferences dealing with education, desegregation, civil rights, and the American South; particularly its food. Among his best-known books are The Americanization of Dixie, Generations: An American Family, Southern Food: At Home, on the Road, in History, and Speak Now Against the Day: The Generation before the Civil Rights Movement in the South.

Egerton's Speak Now Against the Day: The Generation Before the Civil Rights Movement in the South won the Robert F. Kennedy Book Award. He also wrote Southern Food: At Home, On the Road, In History and coedited Nashville: An American Self-Portrait, a look at his adopted city to in the 1960s. In June 2013, five months before his own death, Egerton spoke at the memorial service for preacher and civil rights activist Will D. Campbell.

== Background ==
A native of Atlanta, Egerton was the son of traveling salesman William G. Egerton and his wife Rebecca White. The family settled in the small Kentucky city of Cadiz, where John graduated from Trigg County High School in 1953. He attended Western Kentucky University 1953–54, then served in the U.S. Army 1954–56. He earned a B.A. degree from the University of Kentucky in 1958 and an M.A. in 1960.

== Career ==
Between 1958 and 1960, Egerton was with the Public Relations Department of the University of Kentucky, and from 1960 to 1965, he served as Director of Public Information and Publications for the University of South Florida in Tampa. For six years, beginning in 1965, he was a magazine staff writer for Southern Education Report and its successor, Race Relations Reporter, both based in Nashville from 1965 until 1971.

In 1971, Egerton began his career as a freelance writer of nonfiction, specializing in education, race relations and social-cultural issues in his native region. He was a contributing editor for Saturday Review of Education (1972–73), Race Relations Reporter (1973–74), and Southern Voices (1974–75). During 1973–75, he was a contributing writer for the Southern Regional Council in Atlanta. In 1977–78, he was journalist-in-residence at Virginia Polytechnic Institute and State University.

In 1988–89, he wrote a syndicated food column for the Atlanta Journal-Constitution and other southern newspapers, and in 1996 he was a senior correspondent for The Tennessean, Nashville's morning daily. In 1997 he was a senior lecturer in American Studies at the University of Texas in Austin.

== Southern Foodways Alliance involvement and legacy ==
In 1999, Egerton was one of the founders of the Southern Foodways Alliance (SFA) in the Center for the Study of Southern Culture at the University of Mississippi. In 2007, the SFA established the John Egerton Prize to recognize annually selected "artists, writers, scholars, and others—including artisans and farmers—whose work in the American South addresses issues of race, class, gender, and social and environmental justice, through the lens of food."

Egerton died at the age of 78 after suffering a heart attack at his home in Nashville. He and his wife, Ann Bleidt, were the parents of two sons.

== Bibliography ==
- A Mind to Stay Here New York: Macmillan, 1970.
- Black Public Colleges: Integration and Disintegration Nashville: Race Relations Information Center, 1971.
- Visions of Utopia: Nashoba, Rugby, Ruskin, and the "New Communities" in Tennessee's Past Knoxville: Published in cooperation with the Tennessee Historical Commission by University of Tennessee Press, 1977.
- Nashville: The Faces of Two Centuries, 1780-1980 Nashville: Plus Media, 1979.
- Generations: An American Family Lexington, KY: University Press of Kentucky, 1983.
- Side Orders: Small Helpings of Southern Cookery and Culture Atlanta: Peachtree Publishers, 1990
- Shades of Gray: Dispatches from the Modern South Baton Rouge: Louisiana State University Press, 1991.
- Speak Now Against the Day: The Generation before the Civil Rights Movement in the South New York: Knopf, 1994.
- Generations: An American Family Lexington, KY: University Press of Kentucky, 2003; and Twentieth Anniversary edition, 2003.
- Ali Dubyiah and the Forty Thieves Montgomery, AL: New South Books, 2006.
- With Dana Thomas (author) Nissan in Tennessee Smyrna, TN: Nissan Motor Manufacturing Corp. U.S.A., 1983.
- With Ann Bleidt Egerton and Al Clayton Southern Food: At Home, on the Road, in History New York: Knopf, Distributed by Random House, 1987. Reprinted with a new Introduction by the University of North Carolina Press, 1993.
- With the Southern Foodways Alliance Cornbread Nation 1: The Best of Southern Food Writing Chapel Hill: Published in association with the Southern Foodways Alliance Center for the Study of Southern Culture University of Mississippi by the University of North Carolina Press, 2002.
- Possum on Terrace: The Southern Life and Times of Johnny Popham and a Few of His Friends unpublished manuscript, 1987, at "'Possum on Terrace': A Typed Manuscript from John Egerton on Journalist Johnny Popham," Southern Spaces blog, October 9, 2012,
