= Fenton, Kentucky =

Unincorporated community in Kentucky, United States

Fenton
- Unincorporated community
- Location within the state of Kentucky Fenton (the United States)
- Coordinates: 36°46′37″N 88°6′10″W
- Country: United States
- State: Kentucky
- County: Trigg
- Elevation: 394 ft (120 m)
- Time zone: UTC-6 (Central (CST))
  - Summer (DST): UTC-5 (CST)
- GNIS feature ID: 507987

Fenton is an unincorporated community in Trigg County, Kentucky, United States.

== History ==
The community took its name from John Fenton, a colonel in the American Civil War and owner of the local Eggner's Ferry.

Starting from the early 1800s, the community was prospering and enlarging. However, this growth was put to an end by the arrival of the Tennessee Valley Authority, which displaced numerous residents in the 1960s.
