= Oak Grove, Trigg County, Kentucky =

Unincorporated community in Kentucky, United States

Coordinates: 36.79294°N 87.85870°W

Oak Grove is an unincorporated community in Trigg County, in the U.S. state of Kentucky.

== History ==
The community was named for oak trees near the original town site. The community contains Oak Grove Baptist Church, which dates back to 1875.
