= Oakridge, Montgomery County, Tennessee =

Oakridge
- Unincorporated community
- Location within Tennessee Location within the United States
- Coordinates: 36°23′39″N 87°27′30″W
- Country: United States
- State: Tennessee
- County: Montgomery
- Time zone: UTC-6 (Central (CST))
  - Summer (DST): UTC-5 (CDT)

Oakridge is an unincorporated community in Montgomery County, Tennessee. It is part of the Clarksville, TN–KY Metropolitan Statistical Area.
