= Lake City Historic Commercial District =

Historic district in Florida, United States

- U.S. National Register of Historic Places
- U.S. Historic district
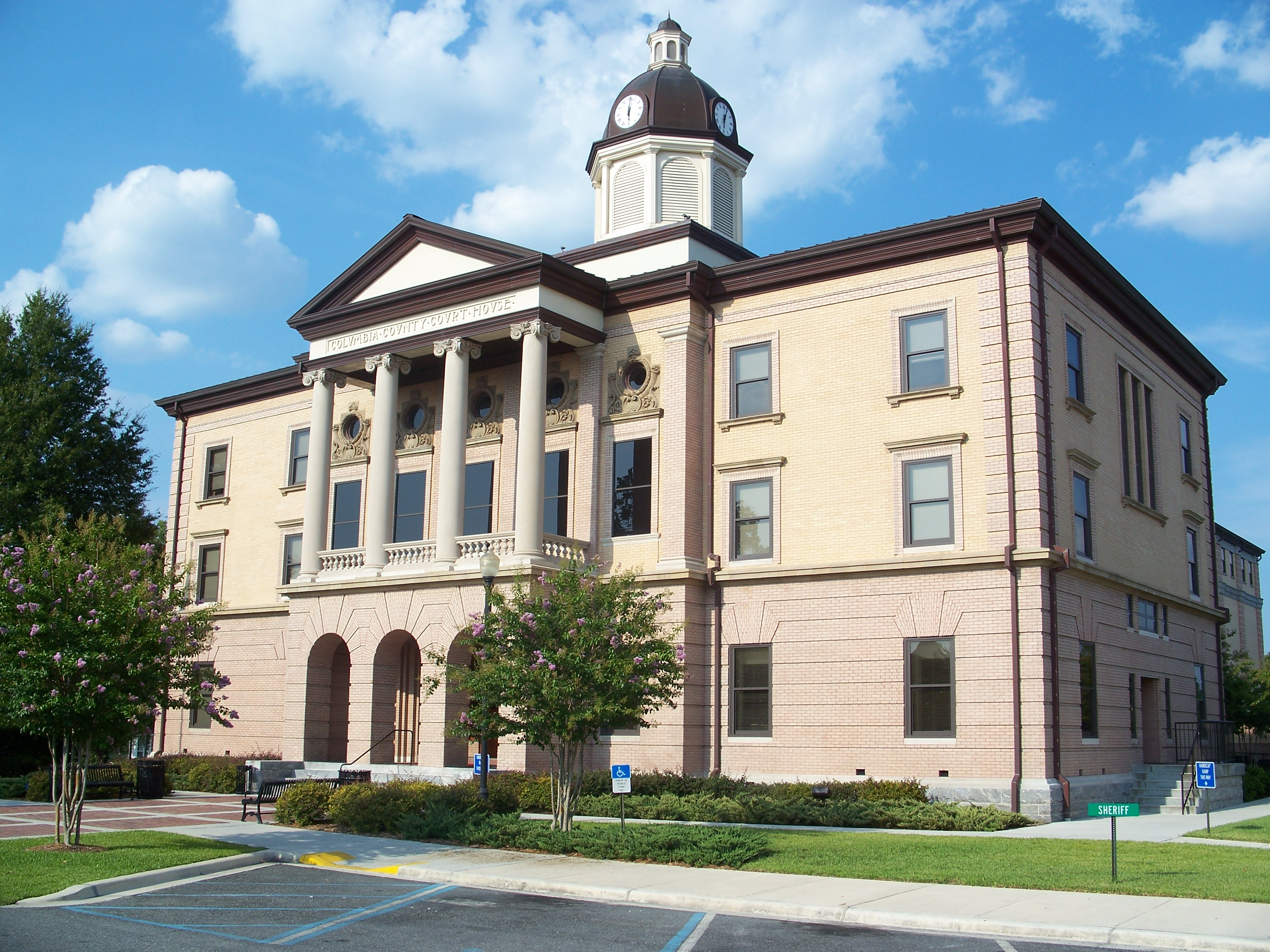
- Columbia County Courthouse, in the district

- Location within Florida Location within the United States
- Location: Lake City, Florida
- Coordinates: 30°11′32″N 82°38′14″W
- Area: 13 acres (5.3 ha)
- MPS: Lake City MPS
- NRHP reference No.: 93001157
- Added to NRHP: June 6, 1994

The Lake City Historic Commercial District is a U.S. historic district (designated as such on June 6, 1994) located in Lake City, Florida. The district is bounded by Railroad, North Hernando, Duval and North Columbia Streets. It contains 47 historic buildings and 1 structure.
