= Wallonia, Kentucky =

Unincorporated community in Kentucky, United States

Wallonia
- Unincorporated community
- Location within the state of Kentucky Wallonia (the United States)
- Coordinates: 36°56′40″N 87°47′00″W
- Country: United States
- State: Kentucky
- County: Trigg
- Elevation: 440 ft (130 m)
- Time zone: UTC-6 (Central (CST))
  - Summer (DST): UTC-5 (CST)
- GNIS feature ID: 506155

Wallonia is an unincorporated community in Trigg County, Kentucky, United States.
