= Brick Inn =

- U.S. National Register of Historic Places
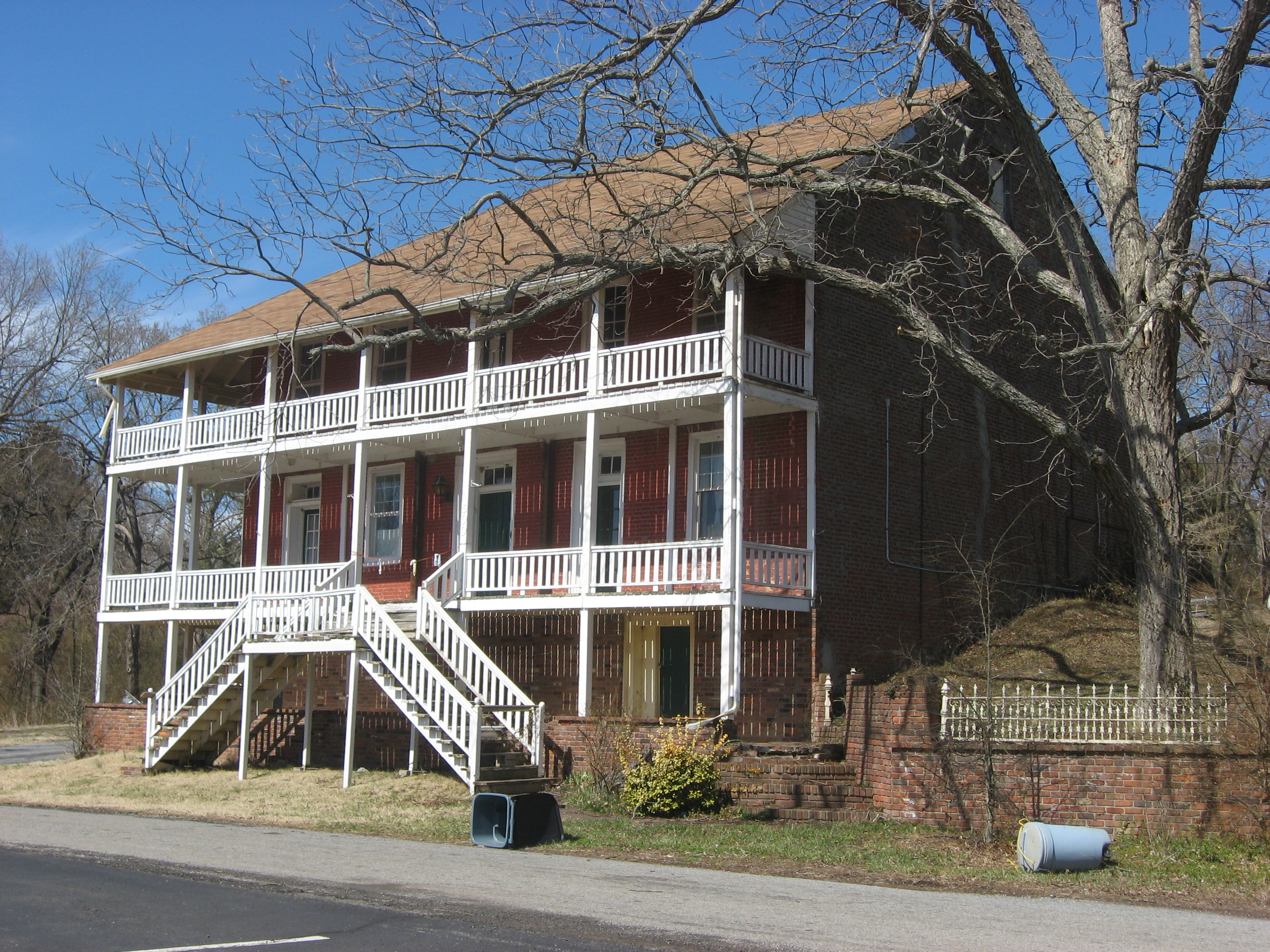

- Location within Kentucky Location within the United States
- Location: Off KY 80, Canton, Kentucky
- Coordinates: 36°48′06″N 87°58′05″W
- Area: 0.7 acres (0.28 ha)
- Built: 1819
- NRHP reference No.: 80001672
- Added to NRHP: April 10, 1980

The Brick Inn, also known as the Canton Hotel, in Canton, Kentucky, was built in 1819. It was listed on the National Register of Historic Places in 1980.

It is a two-story five-bay brick building, with south and west facades laid in Flemish bond.

It is located on Lake Barkley, formerly part of the Cumberland River.

It was built by early settler Abraham Boyd. The hotel hosted visitors including the Marquis de Lafayette, James K. Polk, and Jenny Lind.
