= Trigg County Public Schools =

School district headquartered in Cadiz, Kentucky, United States

Trigg County Public Schools is a school district serving Trigg County, Kentucky. Communities served by the school district include Cadiz, Canton, Cerulean, Wallonia and surrounding areas.

== Schools ==
=== Elementary school ===
- Trigg County Primary School

Serves PreK-2nd Grades

=== Intermediate school ===
- Trigg County Intermediate School

Serves 3rd-5th Grades

=== Middle school ===
- Trigg County Middle School

Serves 6th-8th Grades

=== High school ===
- Trigg County High School

Serves 9th-12th Grades

== Athletics ==
The sports teams at Trigg County High School are known as the Wildcats. Trigg County High first had a sports team in 1937–38 with boys' basketball. The first football team took the field in 1938.

Trigg County has won 16 KHSAA state championships, all in Class 1A sports.

- 1971 – Football (A)
- 1972 – Football (A)
- 1972 – Girls Track (A)
- 1974 – Girls Track (A)
- 1978 – Boys Track (A)
- 1981 – Boys Track (A)
- 1982 – Boys Track (A)
- 1983 – Boys Track (A)
- 1983 – Girls Track (A)
- 1982 – Girls Cross Country (A)
- 1986 – Boys Cross Country (A)
- 1991 – Girls Cross Country (A)
- 1995 – Boys Track (A)
- 2013 – Archery
- 2014 – Archery
- 2015 – Archery
