= 8 West Third Street =

- Wachovia Bank and Trust Company Building
- U.S. National Register of Historic Places
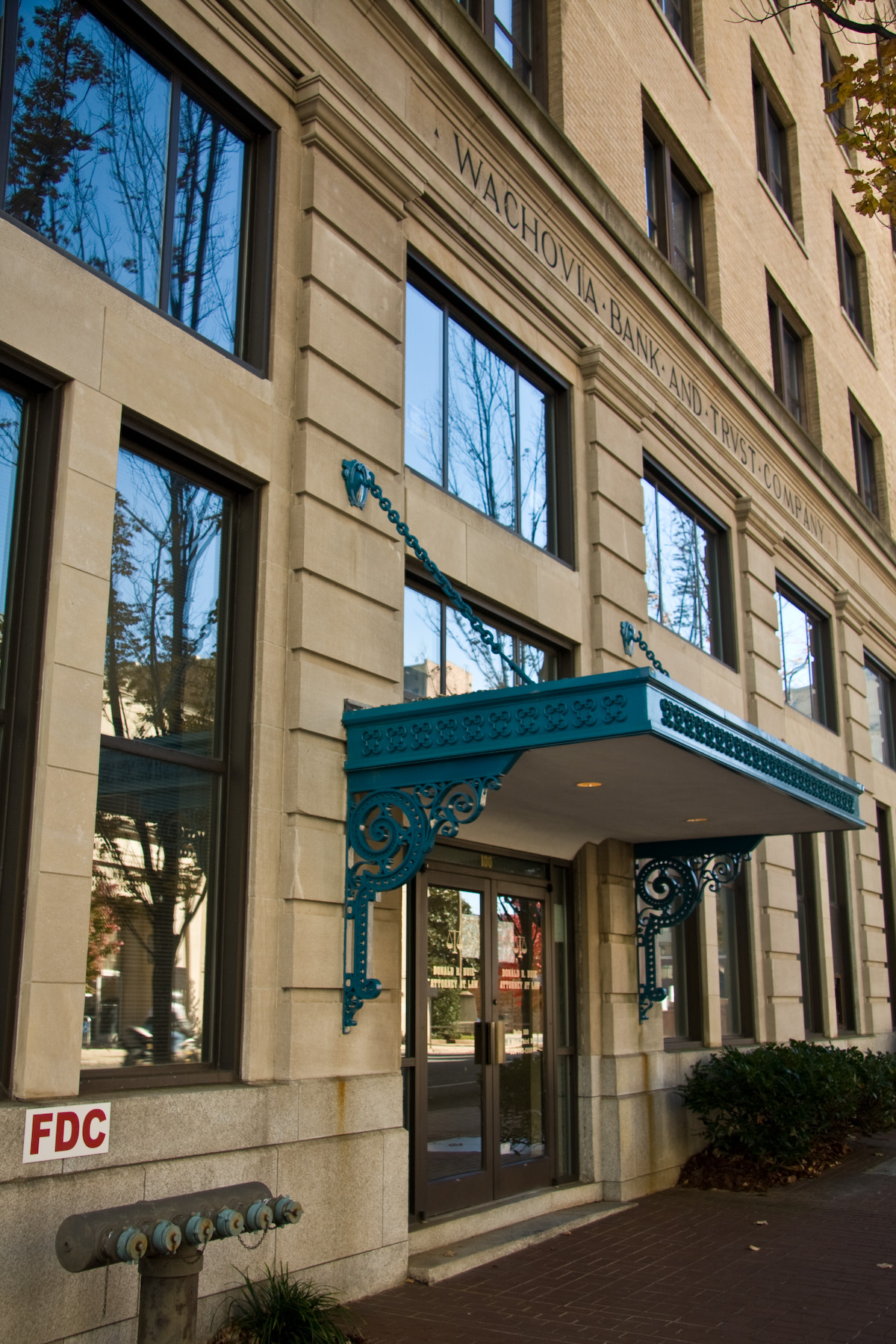

- Location within North Carolina Location within the United States
- Location: 8 W. Third St., Winston-Salem, North Carolina
- Coordinates: 36.097222°N 80.244167°W
- Area: less than one acre
- Built: 1911
- Architect: Milburn, Heister & Company
- Architectural style: Renaissance
- NRHP reference No.: 84002306
- Added to NRHP: March 31, 1984

8 West Third Street is a 126 ft nine-story skyscraper in Winston-Salem, North Carolina, also known as the Wachovia Bank and Trust Company Building. It was built in 1911 as the headquarters of Wachovia Bank and Trust, with the ninth floor added in 1917. It was Winston-Salem's first steel frame skyscraper, built in the Renaissance Revival style, and it was the city's tallest building from 1911 until the O'Hanlon Building was built in 1915, and again from 1917 until the completion of Hotel Robert E. Lee in 1921. The Wachovia Bank and Trust Company Building served as the bank's headquarters until a new headquarters was built in 1966. It was named to the National Register of Historic Places on May 31, 1984, as "Wachovia Bank and Trust Company Building".

It was designed by Frank Pierce Milburn of Milburn, Heister & Company.

Wachovia House Inc., an affiliate of JDL Castle Corp., sold the building for $3 million to PMC Property Group in a deal completed December 7, 2021. Plans so far only include the name 8 W 3.

== See also ==
- List of tallest buildings in Winston-Salem
