= Caledonia, Kentucky =

Unincorporated community in Kentucky, United States

Caledonia
- Unincorporated community
- Location within the state of Kentucky Caledonia (the United States)
- Coordinates: 36°49′13″N 87°41′42″W
- Country: United States
- State: Kentucky
- County: Trigg
- Elevation: 459 ft (140 m)
- Time zone: UTC-6 (Central (CST))
  - Summer (DST): UTC-5 (CST)
- GNIS feature ID: 507638

Caledonia is an unincorporated community in Trigg County, Kentucky, United States. It was also known as Cherryville.

Early settlers included farmers Walter C Anderson, EI Anderson, William G Blain, William R Peal, David W Wootton; merchant Thomas J Hammond; and teacher RS Lewis.
