= Joe Bolton (poet) =

American poet

- photo by Tonya Parsons
- Born: December 3, 1961; Cadiz, Kentucky
- Died: March, 1990 aged 28
- Occupation: Poet

Joe Bolton (December 3, 1961 – March 1990) was an American poet.

He was born in Cadiz, Kentucky. He completed a master's degree from the English department at the University of Florida in 1988. In 1990, after completing his Master of Fine Arts, he died by suicide. He published three books of poetry.

== Bibliography ==
- Breckinridge County Suite (The Cummington Press, 1987).
- Days of Summer Gone (Galileo Press, 1990).
- The Last Nostalgia Poems, 1982–1990, edited by Donald Justice (University of Arkansas Press, 1999) ISBN 1-55728-558-6.
