= Donaldson, Kentucky =

Unincorporated community in Kentucky, United States

Donaldson
- Unincorporated community
- Location within the state of Kentucky Donaldson (the United States)
- Coordinates: 36°45′5″N 87°53′41″W
- Country: United States
- State: Kentucky
- County: Trigg
- Elevation: 397 ft (121 m)
- Time zone: UTC-6 (Central (CST))
  - Summer (DST): UTC-5 (CST)
- GNIS feature ID: 507864

Donaldson is an unincorporated community in Trigg County, Kentucky, United States.
