= Trigg County, Kentucky =

County in Kentucky, United States

- County
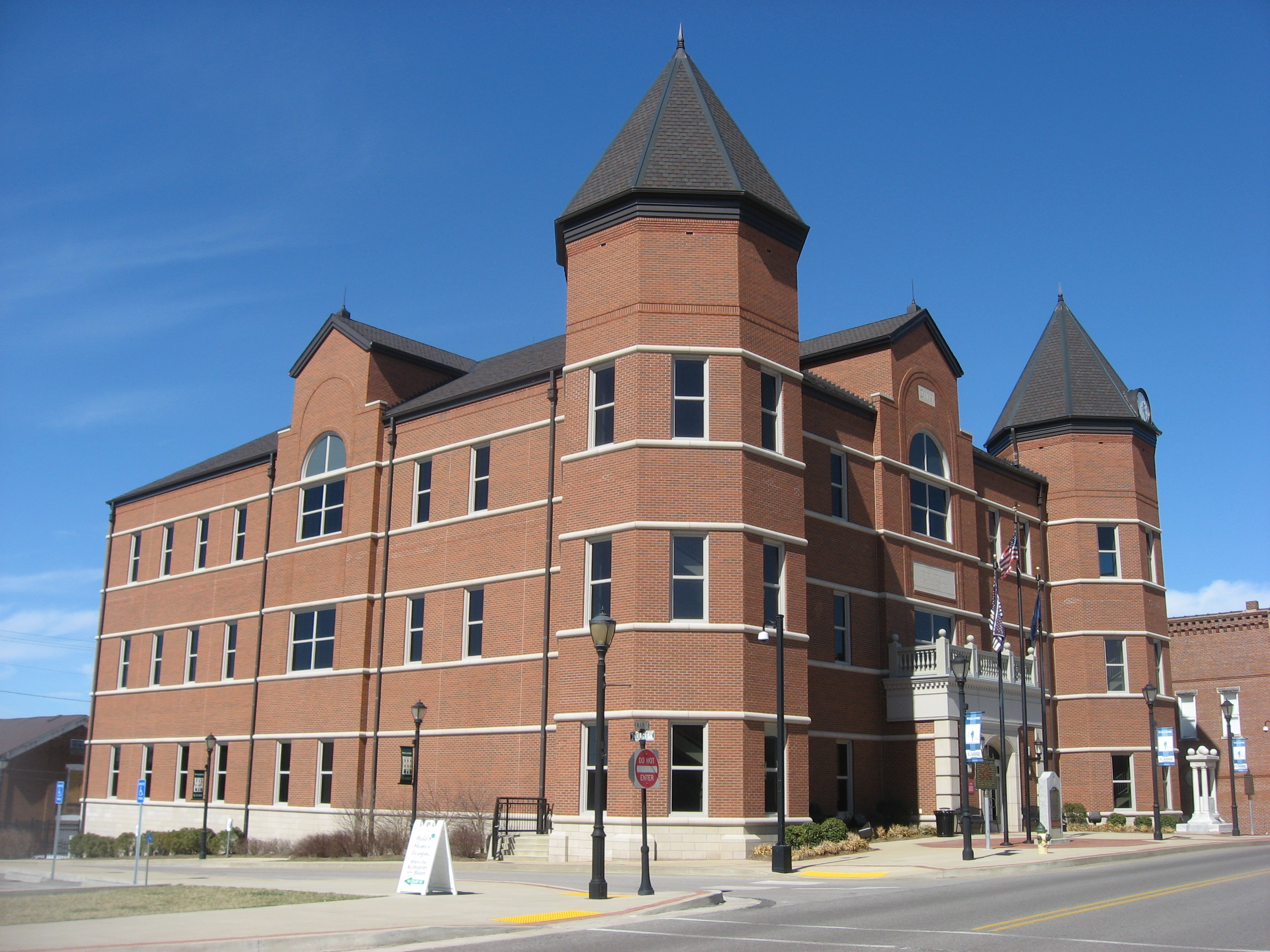
- Trigg County courthouse in Cadiz

- Location within the U.S. state of Kentucky
- Coordinates: 36°49′N 87°53′W
- Country: United States
- State: Kentucky
- Founded: 1820
- Named for: Stephen Trigg
- Seat: Cadiz
- Largest city: Cadiz

Government
  - Judge/Executive: Stanley H. Humphries (R)

Area
  - Total: 481 sq mi (1,250 km^{2})
  - Land: 441 sq mi (1,140 km^{2})
  - Water: 40 sq mi (100 km^{2}) 8.3%

Population (2020)
  - Total: 14,061
  - Estimate (2025): 14,512 ▲
  - Density: 33/sq mi (13/km^{2})
- Time zone: UTC−6 (Central)
  - Summer (DST): UTC−5 (CDT)
- Congressional district: 1st
- Website: triggcounty.ky.gov

Trigg County is a county located on the far southwest border of the U.S. state of Kentucky. As of the 2020 census, the population was 14,061. Its county seat is Cadiz. Formed in 1820, the county was named for Stephen Trigg, an officer in the American Revolutionary War who was killed at the Battle of Blue Licks, now in Robertson County, Kentucky. It was a victory for British and allied troops.

Following the Prohibition era, Trigg continued as a prohibition or dry county until 2009. That year the county's voters narrowly approved a referendum to repeal the prohibition on alcohol sales for off-premises consumption.

Trigg County is part of the Clarksville metropolitan area.

== History ==
Trigg County was formed in 1820 from portions of Christian County and Caldwell counties, as its population had increased.

Trigg County was named in honor of Lt. Col. Stephen Trigg, of Virginia. Trigg had settled near Harrodsburg, Kentucky; during the American Revolutionary War, he served as an officer for the rebels and was killed on August 19, 1782, in the Battle of Blue Licks.

== Geography ==
According to the United States Census Bureau, the county has a total area of 481 square miles (1,250 km^{2}), of which 441 square miles (1,140 km^{2}) is land and 40 square miles (100 km^{2}) (8.3%) is water.

=== Adjacent counties ===
- Lyon County (north)
- Caldwell County (northeast)
- Christian County (east)
- Stewart County, Tennessee (south)
- Calloway County (southwest)
- Marshall County (northwest)

=== National protected area ===
- Land Between the Lakes National Recreation Area (part)

== Demographics ==
Historical population
Census	Pop.	Note	%±
1830	5,916		—
1840	7,716		30.4%
1850	10,129		31.3%
1860	11,051		9.1%
1870	13,686		23.8%
1880	14,489		5.9%
1890	13,902		−4.1%
1900	14,073		1.2%
1910	14,539		3.3%
1920	14,208		−2.3%
1930	12,531		−11.8%
1940	12,784		2.0%
1950	9,683		−24.3%
1960	8,870		−8.4%
1970	8,620		−2.8%
1980	9,384		8.9%
1990	10,361		10.4%
2000	12,597		21.6%
2010	14,339		13.8%
2020	14,061		−1.9%
2025 (est.)	14,512	▲	3.2%
U.S. Decennial Census; 1790-1960 1900-90; 1990-2000 2010-2020 2025

=== 2020 census ===
As of the 2020 census, the county had a population of 14,061. The median age was 46.8 years. 21.9% of residents were under the age of 18 and 23.7% of residents were 65 years of age or older. For every 100 females there were 98.7 males, and for every 100 females age 18 and over there were 96.2 males age 18 and over.

The racial makeup of the county was 87.5% White, 6.8% Black or African American, 0.2% American Indian and Alaska Native, 0.2% Asian, 0.0% Native Hawaiian and Pacific Islander, 0.8% from some other race, and 4.4% from two or more races. Hispanic or Latino residents of any race comprised 2.3% of the population.

0.0% of residents lived in urban areas, while 100.0% lived in rural areas.

There were 5,768 households in the county, of which 25.5% had children under the age of 18 living with them and 23.4% had a female householder with no spouse or partner present. About 27.6% of all households were made up of individuals and 13.5% had someone living alone who was 65 years of age or older.

There were 7,526 housing units, of which 23.4% were vacant. Among occupied housing units, 79.6% were owner-occupied and 20.4% were renter-occupied. The homeowner vacancy rate was 2.6% and the rental vacancy rate was 11.7%.

=== 2000 census ===
As of the census of 2000, there were 12,597 people, 5,215 households, and 3,765 families residing in the county. The population density was 28 per square mile (11/km^{2}). There were 6,698 housing units at an average density of 15 per square mile (5.8/km^{2}). The racial makeup of the county was 88.34% White, 9.79% Black or African American, 0.21% Native American, 0.25% Asian, 0.01% Pacific Islander, 0.18% from other races, and 1.22% from two or more races. 0.90% of the population were Hispanic or Latino of any race.

There were 5,215 households, out of which 29.10% had children under the age of 18 living with them, 60.20% were married couples living together, 8.40% had a female householder with no husband present, and 27.80% were non-families. 25.00% of all households were made up of individuals, and 11.60% had someone living alone who was 65 years of age or older. The average household size was 2.39 and the average family size was 2.84.

In the county, the population was spread out, with 22.90% under the age of 18, 6.80% from 18 to 24, 26.70% from 25 to 44, 27.00% from 45 to 64, and 16.60% who were 65 years of age or older. The median age was 40 years. For every 100 females, there were 96.90 males. For every 100 females age 18 and over, there were 94.10 males.

The median income for a household in the county was $33,002, and the median income for a family was $40,886. Males had a median income of $31,158 versus $22,081 for females. The per capita income for the county was $17,184. About 8.80% of families and 12.30% of the population were below the poverty line, including 13.20% of those under age 18 and 14.70% of those age 65 or over.

== Media ==
=== Radio stations ===
- WKDZ-FM 106.5 (country music)
- WKDZ-AM 1110 AM & 100.9 FM (oldies)
- WHVO 1480 AM & 96.5 F.M. (oldies)

=== Newspapers ===
The Cadiz Record

== Communities ==
=== City ===
- Cadiz (county seat)

=== Census-designated place ===
- Cerulean (partially in Christian County)

=== Other unincorporated places ===
- Black Hawk (mostly in Caldwell County)
- Buffalo
- Caledonia
- Canton
- Donaldson
- Fenton
- Linton
- Montgomery
- Oak Grove
- Roaring Spring
- Rockcastle
- Wallonia

=== Ghost town ===
- Golden Pond

== Politics ==
United States presidential election results for Trigg County, Kentucky
Year	Republican		Democratic		Third party(ies)	
Year	No.	%	No.	%	No.	%
1908	1,351	43.65%	1,680	54.28%	64	2.07%
1912	1,322	46.42%	1,263	44.35%	263	9.23%
1916	1,533	46.05%	1,722	51.73%	74	2.22%
1920	2,420	43.62%	3,056	55.08%	72	1.30%
1924	2,130	44.36%	2,625	54.66%	47	0.98%
1928	2,346	53.52%	2,031	46.34%	6	0.14%
1932	1,452	28.59%	3,611	71.11%	15	0.30%
1936	1,521	34.04%	2,928	65.53%	19	0.43%
1940	1,494	34.05%	2,883	65.70%	11	0.25%
1944	1,332	34.53%	2,511	65.10%	14	0.36%
1948	816	23.55%	2,485	71.72%	164	4.73%
1952	1,134	30.44%	2,585	69.40%	6	0.16%
1956	1,329	34.47%	2,517	65.29%	9	0.23%
1960	1,500	38.35%	2,411	61.65%	0	0.00%
1964	912	24.56%	2,790	75.12%	12	0.32%
1968	1,100	30.38%	1,330	36.73%	1,191	32.89%
1972	1,767	52.95%	1,514	45.37%	56	1.68%
1976	991	26.46%	2,727	72.82%	27	0.72%
1980	1,913	41.54%	2,619	56.87%	73	1.59%
1984	2,512	56.63%	1,905	42.94%	19	0.43%
1988	2,427	54.74%	1,991	44.90%	16	0.36%
1992	1,820	37.49%	2,438	50.22%	597	12.30%
1996	1,975	44.14%	2,087	46.65%	412	9.21%
2000	3,130	58.57%	2,110	39.48%	104	1.95%
2004	4,023	65.83%	2,046	33.48%	42	0.69%
2008	4,189	64.18%	2,246	34.41%	92	1.41%
2012	4,520	67.04%	2,115	31.37%	107	1.59%
2016	4,931	73.04%	1,587	23.51%	233	3.45%
2020	5,487	74.39%	1,791	24.28%	98	1.33%
2024	5,436	75.54%	1,667	23.17%	93	1.29%

The current Judge/Executive is Stanley H. Humphries, who was elected in 2022.

=== Elected officials ===
Elected officials as of January 3, 2025
U.S. House	James Comer (R)	KY 1
Ky. Senate	Jason Howell (R)	1
Ky. House	Mary Beth Imes (R)	5
Ky. House	Walker Thomas (R)	8

== Notable people ==
- Coy Bacon, NFL player
- Darcy C. Coyle, university president
- John Egerton, journalist
- Joe Bolton, poet
- Charles Tyler, musician
- Boots Randolph, musician
- Roger Vinson, U.S. District Court judge
- Hugh "Riccardo" Martin, opera singer

== See also ==
- Trigg County Public Schools
- Eggner Ferry Bridge
- National Register of Historic Places listings in Trigg County, Kentucky
