= Cadiz Downtown Historic District =

Historic district in Kentucky, United States

- U.S. National Register of Historic Places
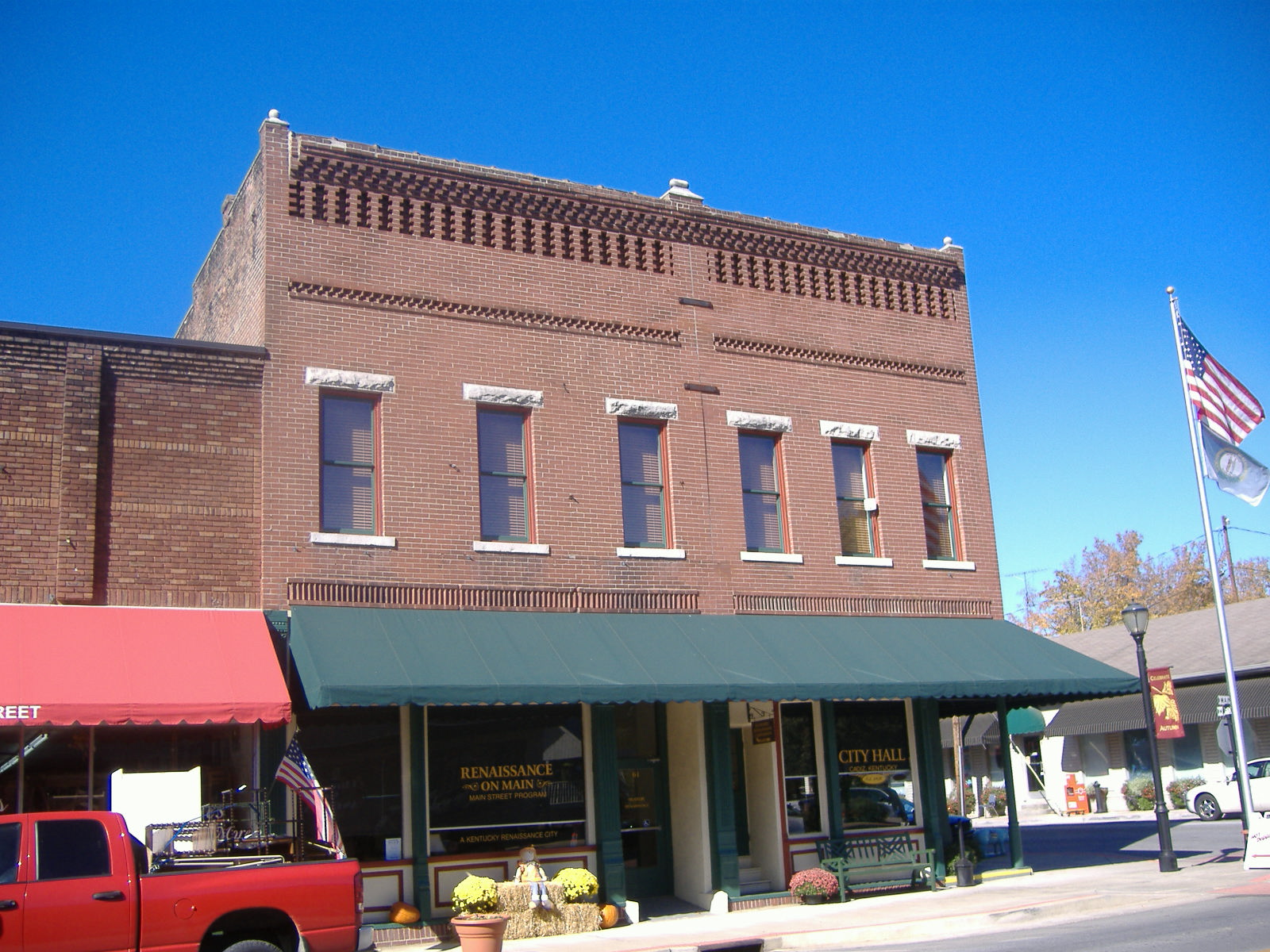
- City Hall, at 63 Main St.

- Location within Kentucky Location within the United States
- Location: Roughly Main St. from Scott to Franklin Sts., Cadiz, Kentucky
- Coordinates: 36°51′44″N 87°50′13″W
- Area: 7 acres (2.8 ha)
- Built: 1920
- Architect: R.H. Hunt, R.H.
- Architectural style: Early Commercial, Classical Revival, Greek Revival
- NRHP reference No.: 88002606
- Added to NRHP: November 14, 1988

The Cadiz Downtown Historic District, in Cadiz, Kentucky, is a historic district which was listed on the National Register of Historic Places in 1988. It includes Main Street from Scott Street to Franklin Street. It includes 16 contributing buildings.

It includes the Trigg County Courthouse, a Classical Revival building built in 1921, designed by Chattanooga architect R.H. Hunt. It is the sixth county courthouse built in Cadiz, replacing the fifth which was built in 1882 and was burned in 1920. The first Trigg County Courthouse was a 26 by 36 feet (7.9 m × 11.0 m) wood-frame building, built in 1821 on Cadiz's then-new town square. A replacement in 1833, a two-story brick building, was burned in December 1864 by Confederate troops in the American Civil War.

The district includes Early Commercial architecture in various commercial buildings, including 63 Main Street, which is in use in 2014 as the city's city hall.

It includes the Cadiz Masonic Lodge No. 121 F. and A.M., built around 1855, which was separately listed on the National Register in 1979, and which is an "example of Greek Revival at its simplest."

It includes a United States Post Office.

The Cadiz Main Street Residential District, listed on the National Register in 1989 is along Main St. directly to the east.
