= Oak Grove, Kentucky =

- City
- Interstate 24 near Oak Grove
- Motto: "Kentucky's Rising Star on the Border"
- Location of Oak Grove in Christian County, Kentucky
- Coordinates: 36°39′30″N 87°25′10″W
- Country: United States
- State: Kentucky
- County: Christian
- Incorporated: 1974

Area
  - Total: 10.74 sq mi (27.82 km^{2})
  - Land: 10.71 sq mi (27.74 km^{2})
  - Water: 0.031 sq mi (0.08 km^{2})
- Elevation: 541 ft (165 m)

Population (2020)
  - Total: 7,931
  - Estimate (2022): 7,997
  - Density: 740.6/sq mi (285.94/km^{2})
- Time zone: UTC-6 (Central (CST))
  - Summer (DST): UTC-5 (CDT)
- ZIP code: 42262
- Area codes: 270 & 364
- FIPS code: 21-57090
- GNIS feature ID: 0499655
- Website: www.oakgroveky.org

Oak Grove is a home rule-class city adjacent to the Fort Campbell army base in Christian County, Kentucky, in the United States. The population was 7,931 as of the 2020 census, up from 7,489 as of the 2010 U.S. census. It is part of the Clarksville, Tennessee metropolitan area.

== History ==
The first post office in Oak Grove was established in 1828. The community was named for oak trees near the original town site. The Clarksville Railroad was extended to Oak Grove in the 19th century.

With construction of nearby Fort Campbell in the Second World War, Oak Grove's population grew. The city was incorporated by the state legislature on September 24, 1974.

=== 1994 New Life Massage Place murders ===
Candy Belt, 22, and Gloria Ross, 18, were both massage therapists who secretly worked as prostitutes at the New Life Massage Place run by Tammy Papler. On September 20, 1994, the bodies of the two women were found in a storeroom after they had been shot and stabbed. The employees of New Life had complained of police harassment, attempts at blackmail and extortion, as well as police expecting services from the prostitutes. In 2013, three men (two of whom were police officers) were charged in the killings. All 3 were acquitted in 2017.

== Geography ==
Oak Grove is located in southeastern Christian County at 36°39′30″N 87°25′10″W (36.658374, -87.419565). Its southern border is the Tennessee state line, and it is bordered to the west by Fort Campbell. Hopkinsville, the Christian County seat, touches the northwest corner of Oak Grove along Fort Campbell Boulevard (U.S. Route 41 Alternate). Interstate 24 forms the northeast boundary of Oak Grove, with access from exit 86 (US 41 Alt.) and exit 89 (Kentucky Route 115). The city of Clarksville, Tennessee, is along the southern boundary of Oak Grove.

According to the United States Census Bureau, Oak Grove has a total area of 10.8 square miles (27.9 km^{2}), of which 0.03 square miles (0.09 km^{2}), or 0.30%, is water.

== Demographics ==
Historical population
Census	Pop.	Note	%±
1980	2,088		—
1990	2,863		37.1%
2000	7,064		146.7%
2010	7,489		6.0%
2020	7,931		5.9%
2024 (est.)	7,973		0.5%
U.S. Decennial Census

=== 2020 census ===
As of the 2020 census, Oak Grove had a population of 7,931. The median age was 25.3 years. 30.0% of residents were under the age of 18 and 3.4% of residents were 65 years of age or older. For every 100 females there were 98.8 males, and for every 100 females age 18 and over there were 94.9 males age 18 and over.

87.5% of residents lived in urban areas, while 12.5% lived in rural areas.

There were 3,033 households in Oak Grove, of which 43.1% had children under the age of 18 living in them. Of all households, 42.3% were married-couple households, 22.2% were households with a male householder and no spouse or partner present, and 26.7% were households with a female householder and no spouse or partner present. About 24.0% of all households were made up of individuals and 2.9% had someone living alone who was 65 years of age or older.

There were 3,363 housing units, of which 9.8% were vacant. The homeowner vacancy rate was 2.7% and the rental vacancy rate was 8.2%.

Racial composition as of the 2020 census
Race	Number	Percent
White	4,182	52.7%
Black or African American	2,202	27.8%
American Indian and Alaska Native	82	1.0%
Asian	125	1.6%
Native Hawaiian and Other Pacific Islander	34	0.4%
Some other race	407	5.1%
Two or more races	899	11.3%
Hispanic or Latino (of any race)	1,048	13.2%

=== 2000 census ===
As of the census of 2000, there were 7,064 people, 2,529 households, and 1,820 families residing in the city. The population density was 685.4 inhabitants per square mile (264.6/km^{2}). There were 2,912 housing units at an average density of 282.5 per square mile (109.1/km^{2}). The racial makeup of the city was 61.72% White, 25.81% African American, 1.03% Native American or Alaska Native, 1.64% Asian, 0.51% Pacific Islander, 3.94% from other races, and 5.35% from two or more races. Hispanics or Latinos of any race were 9.41% of the population.

There were 2,529 households, out of which 50.2% had children under the age of 18 living with them, 58.5% were married couples living together, 10.3% had a female householder with no husband present, and 28.0% were non-families. 17.6% of all households were made up of individuals, and 0.8% had someone living alone who was 65 years of age or older. The average household size was 2.79 and the average family size was 3.14.

The age distribution was 32.2% under the age of 18, 23.4% from 18 to 24, 38.6% from 25 to 44, 4.9% from 45 to 64, and 1.0% who were 65 years of age or older. The median age was 24 years. For every 100 females, there are 113.0 males. For every 100 females age 18 and over, there were 115.7 males.

The median income for a household in the city was $32,235, and the median income for a family was $31,972. Males had a median income of $25,497 versus $18,994 for females. The per capita income for the city was $13,769. About 7.9% of families and 10.6% of the population were below the poverty line, including 13.1% of those under age 18 and 8.0% of those age 65 or over.

== Climate ==
The climate in this area is characterized by hot, humid summers and generally mild to cool winters. According to the Köppen Climate Classification system, Oak Grove has a humid subtropical climate, abbreviated "Cfa" on climate maps.
