= Oakhurst (Greensboro, North Carolina) =

Historic house in North Carolina, United States

Coordinates: 36°10.561′N 79°59.042′W

Oakhurst is a famous Queen Anne style house in Guilford County, North Carolina.

Oakhurst was built by the architect, Frank P. Milburn for Martin H. Holt, who was a co-principal with his brother J. Allen Holt, of Oak Ridge Institute (which is now the Oak Ridge Military Academy).

Oakhurst is an example of surviving Queen Anne style architecture in Guilford County, North Carolina. The wood for the house was heart pine from South Carolina and contained tar and creosote that could not be attacked by termites. The house was originally built without a kitchen; it was said that Mrs. Holt did not care to cook. The Holts took all their meals in the dining hall of the Oak Ridge Institute. It features a three-story tower that rises through the porch roof and is topped with an ogee roof line. The Holts were a pioneering family in cotton manufacturing in North Carolina.

In 1914, Martin retired because of an illness and soon died. Thomas Early Whitaker took over as principal and owner of the school. In 1917 he became the owner of Oakhurst. T.E. Whitaker had such a wide circle of friends that it is said that more guests have been entertained here than any other home in the county. A lifelong friend said, "He had the mind of a chancellor and the ability to adjust differences between friends that was given to few men." He also served in the North Carolina House of Representatives, Session of 1901.

T.E. Whitaker died unexpectedly in 1929. Oakhurst stayed in the Whitaker family until 1981.

Oakhurst is a contributing property to the Oak Ridge Military Academy Historic District and is a Guilford County Historic Landmark.
