= Canton, Kentucky =

Unincorporated community in Kentucky, United States

- Unincorporated community
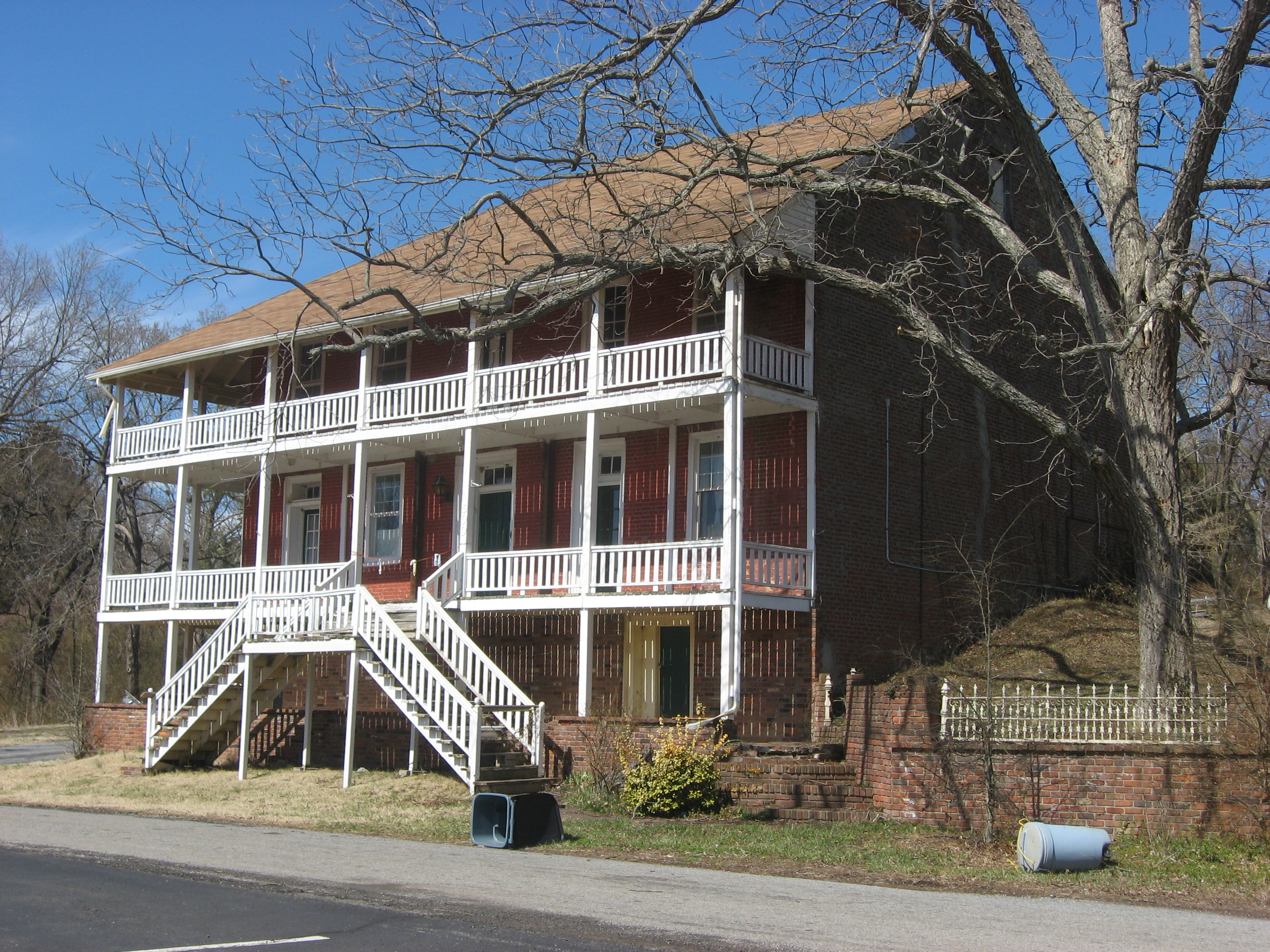
- Canton's historic Brick Inn

- Location within Kentucky
- Coordinates: 36°47′56″N 87°57′39″W
- Country: United States
- State: Kentucky
- County: Trigg
- Elevation: 400 ft (120 m)
- Time zone: UTC-6 (Central (CST))
  - Summer (DST): UTC-5 (CDT)
- ZIP codes: 42212
- Area code: 270
- GNIS feature ID: 507647

Canton is an unincorporated community in Trigg County, Kentucky, United States. Canton is located on the eastern shore of Lake Barkley along U.S. Route 68 and Kentucky Route 80 8.5 miles (13.7 km) west-southwest of Cadiz.
