= Cadiz, Kentucky =

- City
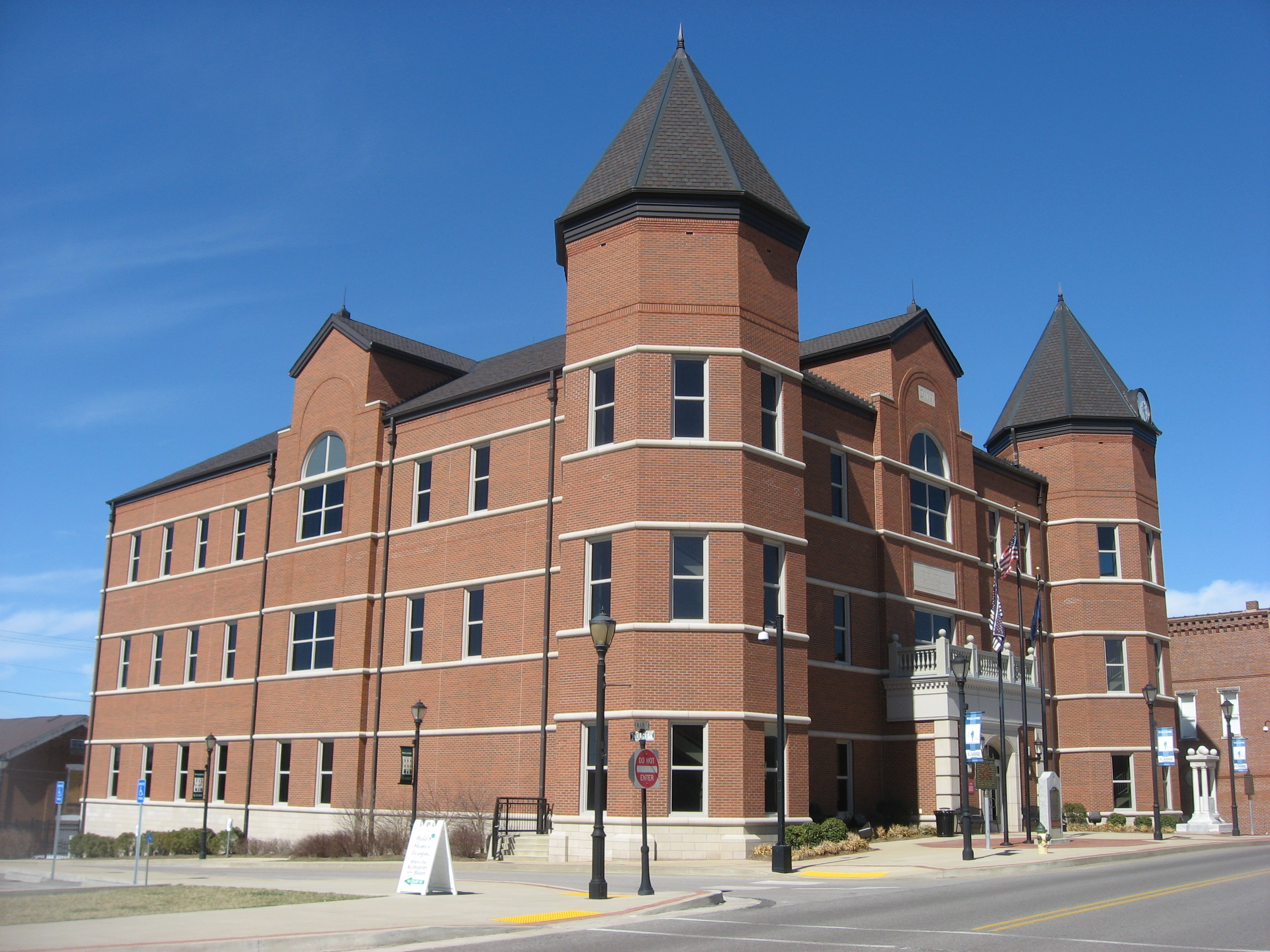
- New Trigg County courthouse, built 2009

- Location of Cadiz in Trigg County, Kentucky.
- Coordinates: 36°52′4″N 87°47′15″W
- Country: United States
- State: Kentucky
- County: Trigg
- Established: 1820

Government
  - Type: Mayor-council government
  - Mayor: Todd King

Area
  - Total: 3.02 sq mi (7.82 km^{2})
  - Land: 3.00 sq mi (7.77 km^{2})
  - Water: 0.023 sq mi (0.06 km^{2})
- Elevation: 505 ft (154 m)

Population (2020)
  - Total: 2,540
  - Estimate (2022): 2,716
  - Density: 847.0/sq mi (327.03/km^{2})
- Time zone: UTC-6 (Central (CST))
  - Summer (DST): UTC-5 (CDT)
- ZIP code: 42211
- Area codes: 270 & 364
- FIPS code: 21-11692
- GNIS feature ID: 2403963
- Website: cadiz.ky.gov

Cadiz (/ˈkeɪdiːz, -dɪz/ KAY-deez, -diz) is a home rule-class city in and the county seat of Trigg County, Kentucky, United States. The population was 2,540 at the 2020 census. It is part of the Clarksville metropolitan area.

Cadiz is a historic town located close to Lake Barkley east of the Land Between the Lakes recreation area. It was a base of Union and Confederate operations during the Civil War.

== History ==
In May 1820. the county commission chose to use Robert Baker's land as the site of the county seat. He relinquished his stable yard and the surrounding 50 acres (200,000 m^{2}). From August to October, the commission platted the town in blocks and named it as Cadiz. Rennick's Kentucky Place Names repeats the local tradition that a Spaniard in the surveying party successfully suggested his hometown. The book also states that "It was definitely not named for the city in Ohio." The name, however, does not take the Spanish pronunciation.

=== 1993 Cadiz auto-truck collision ===
At approximately 4:55 P.M. on Wednesday, December 15, 1993, seven teenage boys, who were classmates at Trigg County High School, along with working together at a game call manufacturing company during after-school hours, were returning to their workplace following dinner break at a local restaurant via U.S. Route 68 in a 1988 Honda Civic. Their vehicle suddenly merged into the opposite lane and while correcting back to their lane was struck drivers-side by the driver of a 1988 Toyota pickup truck who attempted to avoid colliding with them. While all of the car's occupants were pronounced dead at the scene of the accident, the driver of the pickup truck survived despite being moderately injured. The largest loss of life from a vehicular accident in the state of Kentucky since the Carrollton bus collision in 1988 sent shockwaves across the nation.

Following an investigation made and concluded by the Trigg County Police Department, the primary cause of the accident was due to the driver's failure of judgement via overcorrecting, overcrowding the vehicle and not wearing seat belts.

== Geography ==
According to the United States Census Bureau, the city has a total area of 3.5 square miles (9.1 km^{2}), all land.

== Demographics ==
Historical population
Census	Pop.	Note	%±
1830	112		—
1840	450		301.8%
1860	706		—
1870	680		−3.7%
1880	646		−5.0%
1890	890		37.8%
1900	881		−1.0%
1910	1,005		14.1%
1920	897		−10.7%
1930	1,114		24.2%
1940	1,228		10.2%
1950	1,280		4.2%
1960	1,980		54.7%
1970	1,987		0.4%
1980	1,661		−16.4%
1990	2,148		29.3%
2000	2,373		10.5%
2010	2,558		7.8%
2020	2,540		−0.7%
2022 (est.)	2,716		6.9%
U.S. Decennial Census

=== 2020 census ===
As of the 2020 census, Cadiz had a population of 2,540. The median age was 39.1 years. 25.6% of residents were under the age of 18 and 19.9% of residents were 65 years of age or older. For every 100 females there were 77.9 males, and for every 100 females age 18 and over there were 70.9 males age 18 and over.

0.0% of residents lived in urban areas, while 100.0% lived in rural areas.

There were 1,095 households in Cadiz, of which 29.9% had children under the age of 18 living in them. Of all households, 33.9% were married-couple households, 16.3% were households with a male householder and no spouse or partner present, and 43.7% were households with a female householder and no spouse or partner present. About 37.5% of all households were made up of individuals and 17.0% had someone living alone who was 65 years of age or older.

There were 1,270 housing units, of which 13.8% were vacant. The homeowner vacancy rate was 3.8% and the rental vacancy rate was 14.7%.

Racial composition as of the 2020 census
Race	Number	Percent
White	1,969	77.5%
Black or African American	375	14.8%
American Indian and Alaska Native	7	0.3%
Asian	15	0.6%
Native Hawaiian and Other Pacific Islander	0	0.0%
Some other race	18	0.7%
Two or more races	156	6.1%
Hispanic or Latino (of any race)	59	2.3%

=== 2010 census ===
As of the 2010 census, there were 2,558 people, 1,541 households, and 648 families residing in the city. The population density was 685.4 inhabitants per square mile (264.6/km^{2}). There were 1,541 housing units at an average density of 315.7 per square mile (121.9/km^{2}). The racial makeup of the city was 79.2% White, 17.2% African American, 0.13% Native American, 0.66% Asian, 0.04% Pacific Islander, 0.39% from other races, and 2.3% from two or more races. Hispanic or Latino of any race were 0.98% of the population.

There were 1,541 households, out of which 30.1% had children under the age of 18 living with them, 44.5% were married couples living together, 15.8% had a female householder with no husband present, and 35.7% were non-families. 32.9% of all households were made up of individuals, and 18.7% had someone living alone who was 65 years of age or older. The average household size was 2.29 and the average family size was 2.89.

In the city, the population was spread out, with 25.4% under the age of 18, 8.0% from 18 to 24, 24.9% from 25 to 44, 21.8% from 45 to 64, and 20.7% who were 65 years of age or older. The median age was 39 years. For every 100 females, there were 82.5 males. For every 100 females age 18 and over, there were 77.9 males.

The median income for a household in the city was $29,872, and the median income for a family was $37,736. Males had a median income of $30,357 versus $18,929 for females. The per capita income for the city was $13,404. About 17.5% of families and 19.9% of the population were below the poverty line, including 29.2% of those under age 18 and 18.7% of those age 65 or over.

== Notable people ==
- Coy Bacon, NFL player
- Joe Bolton, poet
- John Egerton, journalist
- Boots Randolph, musician
- Charles Tyler, musician
- Roger Vinson, U.S. District Court judge
- Scott A. Howell, retired lieutenant general

== Crime ==
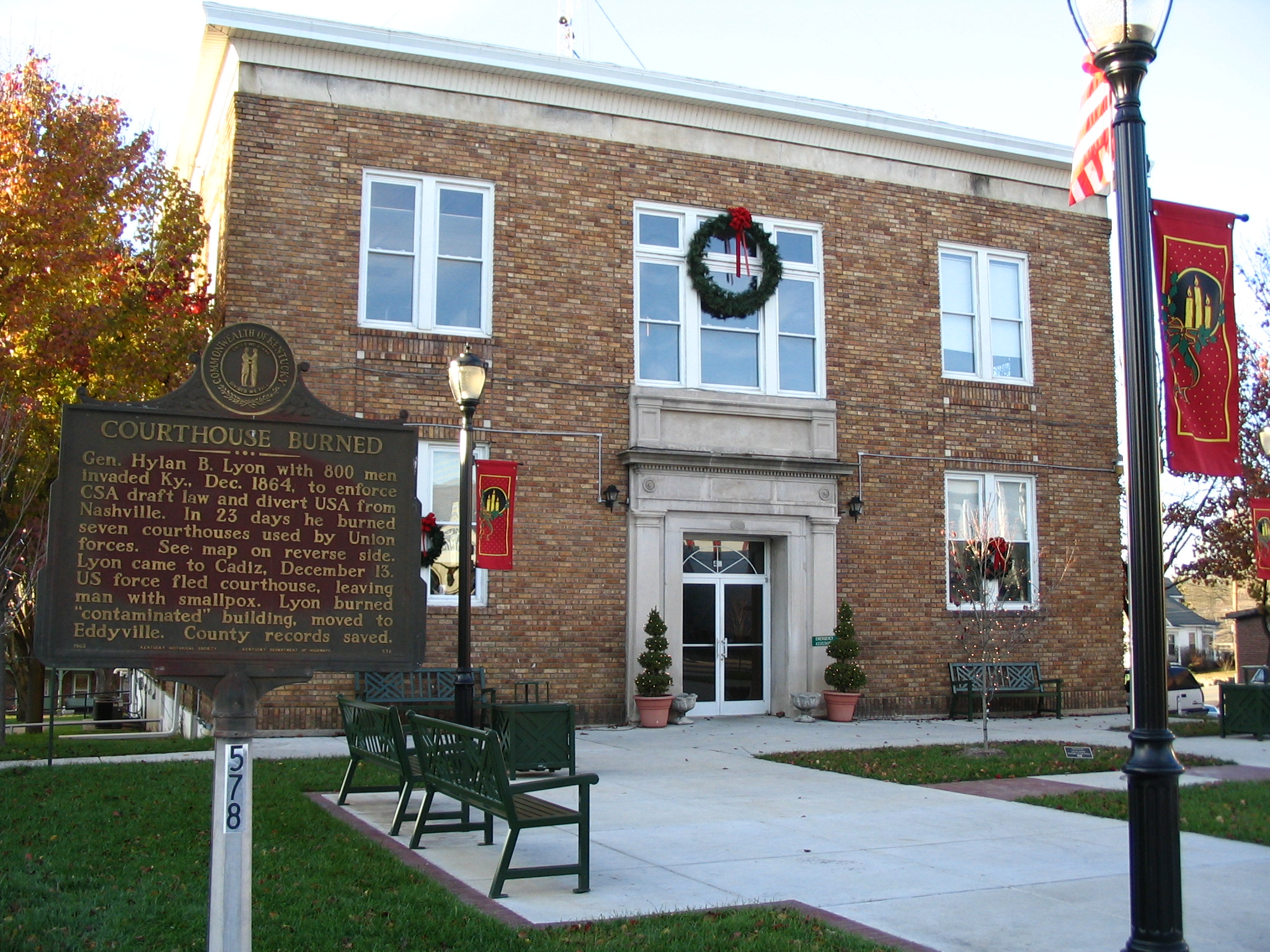
The Old Trigg County courthouse in Cadiz, which was burned twice during the American Civil War. It was destroyed in 2008 to make way for the new courthouse, which sits on the same site.

Cadiz boasts one of the lowest crime rates in Kentucky. The total crime risk index score for Cadiz is 34, which is 37 points below the statewide crime risk score of 71 and 66 points below the national crime risk score of 100.

== Schools ==
Public education in Cadiz is operated by Trigg County Public School District. It operates a single campus on Main Street.

Cadiz also operates the public John L. Street Library.

== Climate ==
Cadiz has a humid climate and four distinct seasons. The warmest month of the year is July, with an average high temperature of 90 °F. The coldest month is January, with an average high temperature of 44 °F.

Monthly Normal and Record High and Low Temperatures for Cadiz, KY
Month	Jan	Feb	Mar	Apr	May	Jun	Jul	Aug	Sep	Oct	Nov	Dec
Rec High °F	80	82	87	91	94	102	104	104	107	95	83	78
Norm High °F	44	49	59	70	78	85	90	88	82	71	59	48
Norm Low °F	25	29	38	46	55	63	68	66	59	47	38	29
Rec Low °F	-20	-10	-8	21	29	39	47	43	31	20	7	-14
Precip (in)	3.80	4.48	4.60	4.40	5.07	4.22	4.03	3.17	3.50	3.26	4.86	4.69
