= Marshall County Schools (Tennessee) =

School district in Lewisburg, Tennessee

Address
- 700 Jones Circle Lewisburg, Tennessee, 37091; United States

District information
- Type: Public
- Grades: PreK–12
- Accreditation: Tennessee Department of Education
- NCES District ID: 4702670

Students and staff
- Students: 5,361
- Teachers: 326.0
- Staff: 394.5
- Student–teacher ratio: 16.44

Other information
- Website: www.mcstn.net

Marshall County Schools is a school district headquartered in Lewisburg, Tennessee, serving all of Marshall County. Lewisburg is home to Oak Grove Elementary, Marshall Elementary, Westhills Elementary, Lewisburg Middle, and Marshall County High School, who are the Tigers. Cornersville is home to Cornersville Elementary and Cornersville School, who are the bull dogs. Chapel Hill is home to Chapel Hill Elementary, Delk-Henson Intermediate, and Forrest School, who are the Rockets. In addition, Spot Lowe Vocational Center provides CTE courses and training for the district's high school students across the county. Cornersville and Forrest, due to size, integrate their seventh and eight grade students into their respective high schools.

== Schools ==
The following schools are a part of Marshall County Schools:

- Elementary Schools
  - Oak Grove Elementary School
  - Marshall Elementary School
  - Westhills Elementary School
  - Cornersville Elementary School
  - Chapel Hill Elementary School
  - Delk-Henson Intermediate School
- Middle Schools
  - Lewisburg Middle School
- High Schools
  - Marshall County High School
  - Cornersville School
  - Forrest School
- Other
  - Spot Lowe Vocational Center (Attached to MCHS and CS)

== Westhills Television Network ==
Westhills Elementary School, of Lewisburg, Tennessee has its own YouTube channel titled Westhills Television Network (WTN). As of March 26, 2026 the channel has 547 subscribers and is headquartered inside the school.

== Athletic facilities ==
In Lewisburg, there is a football field that is shared with both Lewisburg Middle School, and Marshall County High School. There is a large fence on the right-side edge of the field because there is also a baseball field that which were both donated from local residents. For Lewisburg Middle School, the swim team uses the community center swimming pool, as well as the high school.

== Notable people ==
- Dont'a Hightower, Born in Lewisburg, TN and attended Marshall County High School, he is a famous NFL player.
- Marcus Haislip, Born in Lewisburg, TN and attended Marshall County High School, he is a retired famous NBA player, and he has played for other leagues.
- Jason Maxwell, born and raised in Lewisburg, TN and he is a former professional baseball player. Primarily an infielder, Maxwell first played in 1998 for the Chicago Cubs.
- Mike Minor - Went to Forrest High School, He is a professional baseball player with the Texas Rangers

== See also ==
- Lewisburg, Tennessee micropolitan area
- Marshall County, Tennessee
