= Marshall County High School =

Marshall County High School may refer to:

- Marshall County High School (Kentucky)
  - 2018 Marshall County High School shooting
- Marshall County High School (Tennessee)
