= Marshall County School District =

Marshall County School District, Marshall County School System, or Marshall County Schools may refer to:

- Marshall County School District (Alabama)
- Marshall County School District (Kentucky)
- Marshall County School District (Mississippi)
- Marshall County School District (Tennessee)
- Marshall County Schools (West Virginia)
