= Edens =

Edens is a surname, and may refer to:

- Arthur Hollis Edens (1901–1968), American academic
- Bennie Edens (1925–2008), American football coach
- Charles M. Edens (1897–1939), American football, basketball and baseball coach
- Cooper Edens (born 1945), American writer
- Drake Edens (1925–1982), American politician
- J. J. Edens (1840–1914), American politician from Washington State
- Roger Edens (1905–1970), American composer
- Susan Reutzel-Edens, American chemist
- Simon Edens, British police chief constable
- Timothy J. Edens (born 1958), American army officer
- Tom Edens (born 1961), American baseball pitcher
- Wes Edens (born 1961), American businessperson

== See also ==
- Iens, village in the Netherlands, formerly called Edens
