= Cody Forsythe =

American professional baseball pitcher

- Pitcher
- Born: September 17, 1990 (age 34); Paducah, Kentucky, U.S.
- Bats: Left Throws: Left
Medals
Men's baseball
Representing United States
WBSC Premier12
Silver medal – second place	2015 Tokyo	Team

Cody Ryan Forsythe (born September 17, 1990), is an American former professional baseball pitcher.

== Career ==
Forsythe attended Marshall County High School in Draffenville, Kentucky, and the Southern Illinois University Carbondale, where he played college baseball for the Southern Illinois Salukis.

The Philadelphia Phillies selected him in the 25th round of the 2013 Major League Baseball (MLB) draft. He played for the Lakewood BlueClaws and Clearwater Threshers in 2014, and spent time with the same teams in 2015.

After the 2015 season, he played for the United States national baseball team in the 2015 WBSC Premier12.

On April 2, 2016, the Phillies organization released Forsythe.

In 2016, Forsythe signed with the Laredo Lemurs of the independent American Association, and was traded to the Sioux City Explorers.

In 2017, he resigned with Sioux City. He was released on January 17, 2018.
