= Clarks River National Wildlife Refuge =

Forest in Kentucky, United States of America

- IUCN category IV (habitat/species management area)
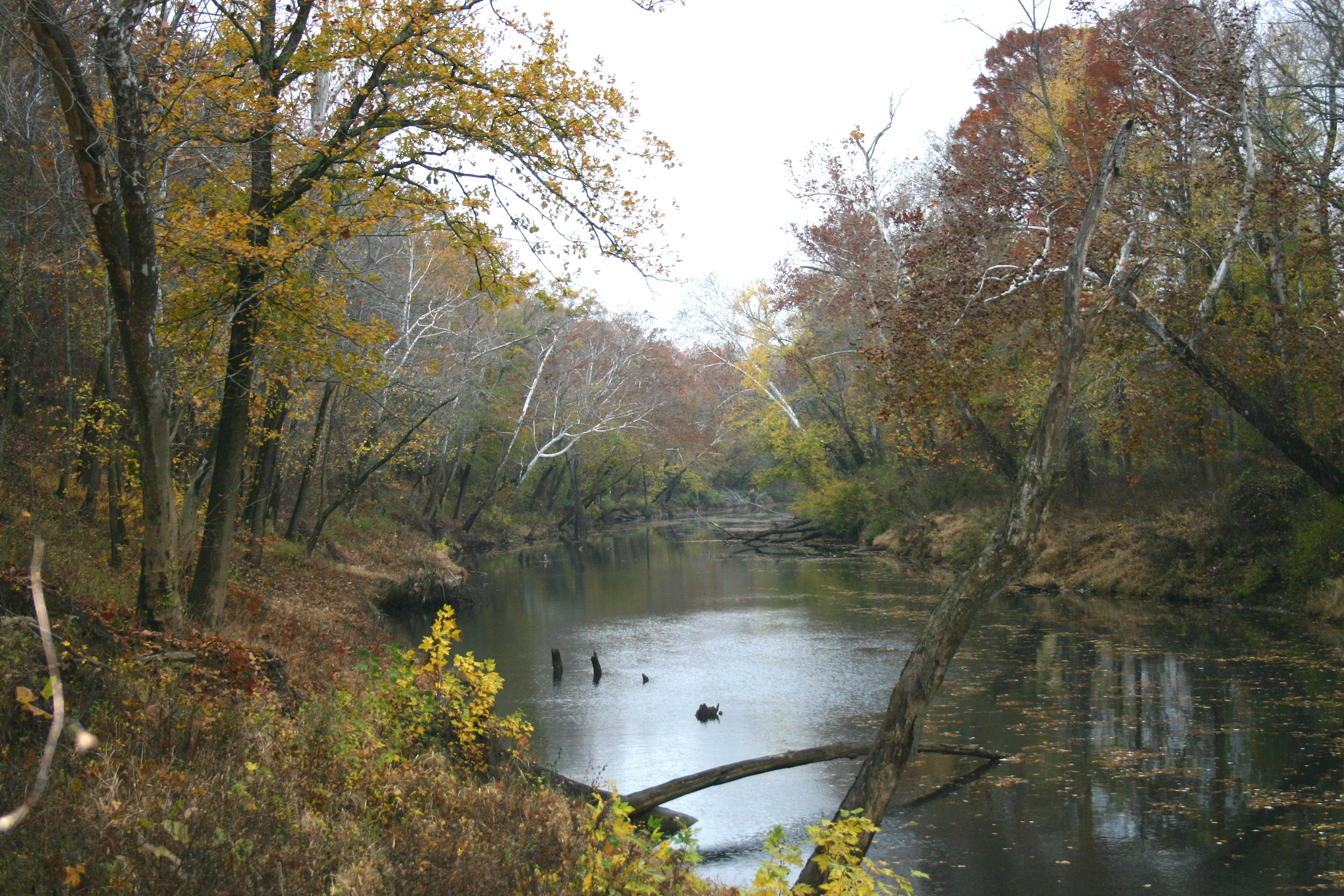
- Clarks River

- Location within the United States Location within Kentucky
- Location: Graves County, Marshall County, McCracken County, Kentucky, United States
- Nearest city: Benton, Kentucky
- Coordinates: 36.889°N 88.3612°W
- Area: 8,040 acres (32.5 km^{2})
- Established: 1997
- Governing body: U.S. Fish and Wildlife Service
- Website: Clarks River National Wildlife Refuge

Clarks River National Wildlife Refuge is an 11,890-acre (48.1 km^{2}) bottomland hardwood forest in western Kentucky near Benton. The refuge lies along the East Fork of the Clarks River and is the seasonal home to more than 200 species of migratory birds. The bottom lands are dominated with overcup oaks, bald cypress, and tupelo-gum, and the slightly higher, better drained areas are covered with willow oak, swamp chestnut oak, red oak, sweet gum, sycamore, ash, and elm.
