= Marshall County High School (Tennessee) =

High school in Tennessee, United States

Coordinates: 35.4633°N 86.8155°W

Location
- 661 West Ellington Parkway; Lewisburg, (Marshall County), Tennessee 37091; United States

Information
- Type: Public high school
- NCES School ID: 470267000953
- Principal: David Steely
- Staff: 47.45 (FTE)
- Enrollment: 815 (2022-23)
- Student to teacher ratio: 17.18
- Colors: Royal blue White
- Athletics conference: TSSAA
- Nickname: Tigers
- Website: www.mcstn.net/o/mchs

Marshall County High School is a public high school in Lewisburg, Tennessee, and a part of Marshall County Schools. Marshall County High School has 812 students in grades 9-12 with a student-teacher ratio of 18 to 1. The school's square footage is 97,540.

== History ==
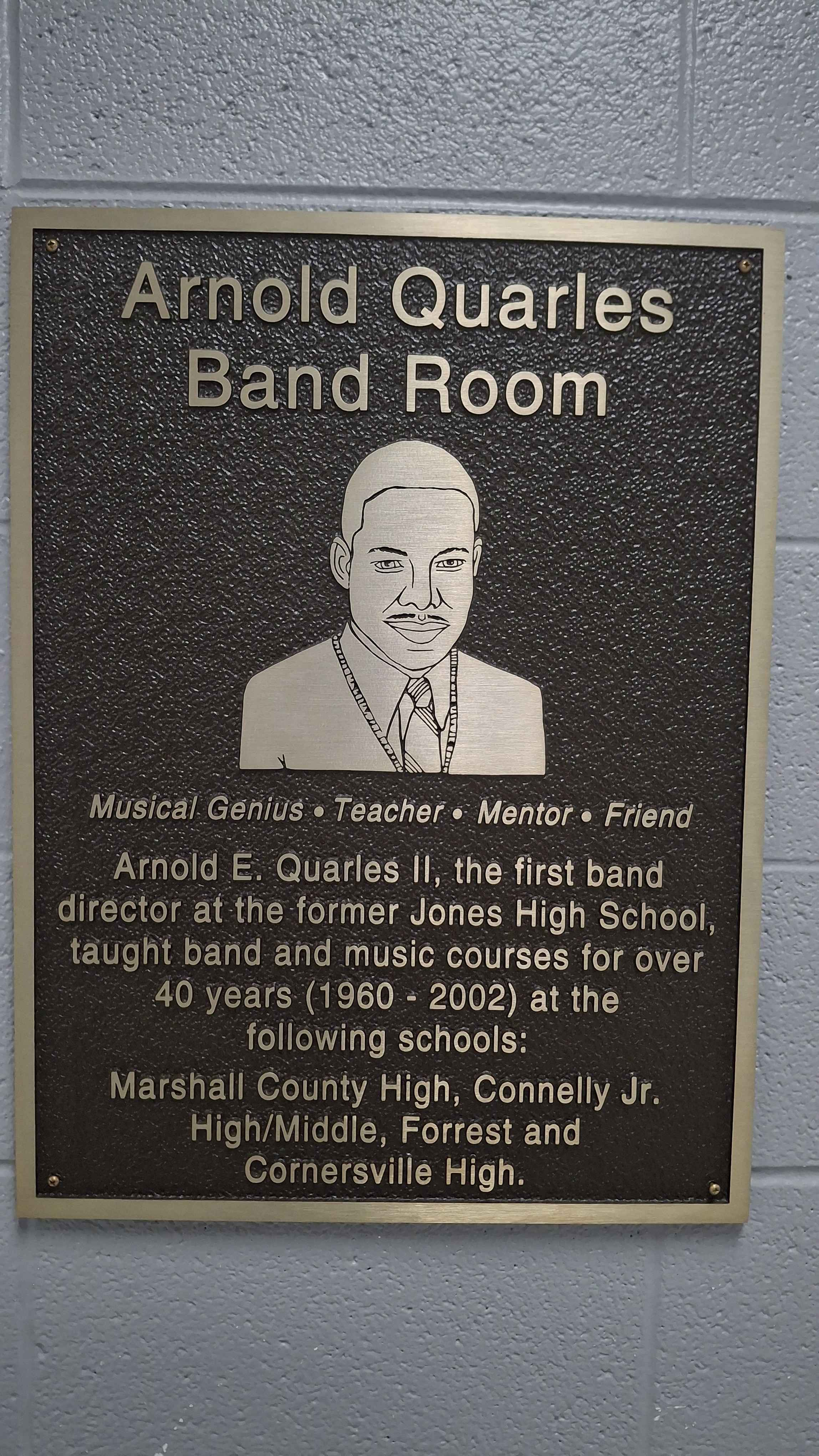
The plaque for Arnold Quarles Band Room at Marshall County High School (Tennessee)

In 1931, students engaged in renovation projects for the school in its old location.

In 2021, Justin Perry became the principal at Marshall County High School. In 2025, Justin Perry was promoted to Director of Schools for the Marshall County School District. The same year, David Steely was soon promoted to be principal of Marshall County High School.

Arnold Quarles Jr. was a longtime educator in Marshall County and for Marshall County High School, who contributed to the county's arts programs. He was the first band director for Jones School in Marshall County, an African-American school during southern segregation. Over 40 years, Quarles had worked at the several schools across the school district (including Cornersville School and Forrest School), until his retirement in 2001. According to the Marshall County Tribune, many students described him as dedicated and rigorous in his leadership for band and music programs. Quarles later served on the Marshall County Community Development Board in his retirement from teaching.

== Extracurriculars ==
The school's student council has been recognized numerous times by the Jostens's Renaissance program, placing the school in Platinum Distinction, the highest level, from 2023 to 2026 based on school culture and achievement.

The Book of Marshall, a local history podcast for Marshall County, is produced by the school's history club.

== Athletics ==
Marshall County High School has a wide range of extracurriculars. The school fields a multitude of varsity teams, including football, cheer, cross country, volleyball, wrestling, soccer, swim, baseball/softball, bowling, basketball, golf, and tennis teams, known as the Tigers. The school competes under the TSSAA.

In 2015, Football Coach Bob Edens was inducted into the TSSAA's Hall of Fame. Although he had not establish his career in Marshall County, he had coached 22 seasons for the Tigers.

Team State Titles
Year	Sport	Class	Award	Details
1972	Girls' Basketball		Champions	(31-0)
1976	Girls' Basketball	Class AA	Champions	(27-4)
1979	Baseball	Class AA	Runner-Up	(15-6)
1980	Girls' basketball	Class AA	Champions	(26-2)
1984	Football	Class AA	Champions	
1983	Baseball	Class AA	Champions	(31-0)
1989	Baseball	Class AA	Runner-Up	(24-5)
1993	Baseball	Class AA	Champions	(26-3)
1994	Baseball	Class AA	Champions	(30-2)
1995	Baseball	Class AA	Runner-Up	(29-5)
1997	Boys' Golf	Class A-AA	Champions	
1998	Boys' Golf	Class A-AA	Champions	
1999	Boys' Golf	Class A-AA	Runner-Up	
1999	Baseball	Class AA	Runner-Up	(31-2)
2004	Softball	Class AA	Runner-Up	(27-16)
2005	Softball	Class AA	Champions	(30-9-4)
2002	Boys' Basketball	Class AA	Runner-Up	(28-6)
2007	Girls' Basketball	Class AA	Runner-Up	(25-10)
2008	Girls' Basketball	Class AA	Champions	(32-4)

Individual State Titles
Year	Sport	Class	Award	Details / Name
1997	Boys' Golf	Class A-AA	Champion	Joey Morefield
1999	Boys' Golf	Class A-AA	Champion	Joey Morefield
2007	Girls' Tennis	Class A-AA	Double Champions	Lyssa Wiles Tori Richardson

== Notable alumni ==
- Marcus Haislip, former American professional basketball player for the NBA (2002-2005, 2009-2010) and EuroLeague (2005-2009).
- Dont'a Hightower, current American football coach and former linebacker for the New England Patriots.
- Jason Maxwell, former American professional baseball player for the Chicago Cubs (1998, 2000-2001).
