= Zion Harmon =

American basketball player (born 2002)

No. 0 – Georgetown Tigers
- Position: Point guard
- League: Mid-South Conference

Personal information
- Born: March 12, 2002 (age 24) Bethesda, Maryland, U.S.
- Listed height: 6 ft 0 in (1.83 m)
- Listed weight: 185 lb (84 kg)

Career information
- High school: Bowling Green (Bowling Green, Kentucky); Adair County (Columbia, Kentucky); Marshall County (Benton, Kentucky); Bella Vista Prep (Scottsdale, Arizona)
- College: Bethune–Cookman (2022–2024); Seton Hall (2024–2025); Georgetown (KY) (2025–present)
Medals
Men's basketball
Representing United States
FIBA Americas U16 Championship
Gold medal – first place	2017 Argentina	Team

Zion Lamont Harmon (born March 12, 2002) is an American college basketball player for the Georgetown Tigers of the Mid-South Conference. He previously played for the Seton Hall Pirates and Bethune–Cookman Wildcats.

== Early life ==
At age 11, Harmon made headlines as the top fourth-grade basketball player in the United States. In seventh grade, he joined the varsity team at Lighthouse Christian School in Antioch, Tennessee. He became the first seventh-grade player to compete in the Nike Elite Youth Basketball League. For eighth grade, Harmon moved to Bowling Green High School in Bowling Green, Kentucky and led the team to its first state title, alongside current NBA player Terry Taylor.

Because of a coaching change at Bowling Green, Harmon transferred to Adair County High School in Columbia, Kentucky for his freshman season. He averaged 32.7 points and 7.8 assists per game, and was recognized as MaxPreps National Freshman of the Year. He moved to Marshall County High School in Benton, Kentucky but sat out his sophomore season after being ruled ineligible. During that time, Harmon joined Bella Vista Prep, a team based in Scottsdale, Arizona. He won the Grind Session title and was named game MVP. As a junior at Marshall County, Harmon averaged 25.4 points and five rebounds per game. In his senior season, he averaged 22.3 points, earning all-state honors from The Courier-Journal for a fourth time. A consensus four-star recruit, Harmon committed to playing college basketball for Western Kentucky over offers from Kansas, Maryland, Murray State and Seton Hall.

== National team career ==
Harmon represented the United States at the 2017 FIBA Under-16 Americas Championship in Argentina. He averaged 11.4 points and 3.2 assists per game, helping his team win the gold medal.

== Personal life ==
Harmon's older brother, Zalmico, played college basketball for UC Santa Barbara.
