= Thomas Rickman (writer) =

American writer and film director

- Born: February 8, 1940; Sharpe, Kentucky, U.S.
- Died: September 3, 2018 (aged 78)
- Other name: Tom Rickman
- Education: AFI Conservatory
- Occupations: Film director, playwright, screenwriter

Thomas "Tom" Rickman (February 8, 1940 – September 3, 2018) was an American film director, playwright, and screenwriter. He is best known for his work on the 1980 film Coal Miner's Daughter.

== Early life and education ==
Rickman was born in Sharpe, Kentucky.

He was in the first class at the AFI Conservatory in Los Angeles; the class also included Gill Dennis, Terrence Malick, David Lynch and Caleb Deschanel.

== Career ==
In 1975, his stage play Balaam premiered at the Pasadena Repertory Theater in Pasadena, California's historic The Hotel Carver, under artistic director Duane Waddell, directed by Gill Dennis, starring Elizabeth Hartman, Peter Brandon, Howard Whalen, and was the theatrical debut of Ed Harris.

He received a nomination for Academy Award for Best Adapted Screenplay for writing the screenplay of Coal Miner's Daughter. His other films include Hooper (1978), Everybody's All-American (1988), and the television films Truman (1995) and Tuesdays with Morrie (1999)

== Teaching ==
For many decades Rickman and his AFI classmate Gill Dennis taught at the screenwriting workshop portion of the Squaw Valley Community of Writers, as it was then called. In his later years, Rickman also taught screenwriting at AFI.
