= Possum Trot, Kentucky =

Unincorporated community in Kentucky, United States

- Unincorporated community
- Location within Kentucky Location within the United States
- Coordinates: 37°0′20″N 88°25′50″W
- Country: United States
- State: Kentucky
- County: Marshall
- Elevation: 348 ft (106 m)
- Time zone: UTC-6 (Central (CST))
  - Summer (DST): UTC-5 (CST)
- GNIS feature ID: 501168

Possum Trot is an unincorporated community in Marshall County, Kentucky, United States. Possum Trot is located on U.S. Route 62 between Paducah and Calvert City in the Jackson Purchase region of Western Kentucky.

Possum Trot has been noted for its unusual place name. As local legend tells it, Sol King and Buck Bolen were possum hunting in the area in the early 1900s, and one said "If we don't get one soon, these possums are going to trot across the road and be gone."

== Notable people ==
Robert H. Grubbs, ForMemRS (February 27, 1942 – December 19, 2021) was an American chemist and the Victor and Elizabeth Atkins Professor of Chemistry at the California Institute of Technology in Pasadena, California. He was a co-recipient of the 2005 Nobel Prize in Chemistry for his work on olefin metathesis.
