= Marshall County Schools (Kentucky) =

School district in Kentucky, United States

Address
- 86 High School Road Benton, Kentucky, 42025; United States

District information
- Type: Public
- Grades: PreK–12
- NCES District ID: 2103810

Students and staff
- Students: 4,589
- Teachers: 280.06
- Staff: 368.95
- Student–teacher ratio: 16.39

Other information
- Website: www.marshall.kyschools.us

Marshall County Schools is a school district headquartered in the Draffenville area of unincorporated Marshall County, Kentucky, near Benton. It serves all of Marshall County.

== Schools ==
High schools

- Marshall County High School
- Star Academy High School

Middle schools

- North Marshall
- South Marshall

Elementary schools

- Benton
- Calvert City
- Central
- Jonathan
- Sharpe
- South Marshall
