= Sharpe, Kentucky =

Unincorporated community in Kentucky, United States

- Unincorporated community
- Location within Kentucky Location within the United States
- Coordinates: 36°58′07″N 88°27′30″W
- Country: United States
- State: Kentucky
- County: Marshall
- Elevation: 410 ft (120 m)
- Time zone: UTC-6 (Central (CST))
  - Summer (DST): UTC-5 (CST)
- GNIS feature ID: 503262

Sharpe is an unincorporated community in northwest Marshall County, Kentucky, United States. The community is on US Route 68 approximately 12 miles southeast of Paducah.

Thomas Rickman (1940–2018), American screenwriter, was born in Sharpe.
