= Draffenville, Kentucky =

Unincorporated community in Kentucky, United States

Coordinates: 36°55′32″N 88°20′30″W

Draffenville is an unincorporated community in Marshall County, Kentucky, United States. It is next to Benton, and lies at the intersection of the Julian M. Carroll Purchase Parkway, U.S. Route 68, and U.S. Route 641. Several businesses, Marshall County High School, and Mike Miller County Park are located in the community.

Draffenville resulted from the construction of the Kentucky Dam in the late 1930s. Businesses sprang up to service the workers on the dam. The town is named for Charley Draffen, a prominent landowner at the time of the dam's construction.

On January 23, 2018, a mass shooting occurred at Marshall County High School, killing two people and wounding 18 others. A 15-year-old male student was arrested.

== Education ==
It is within Marshall County Schools, and houses Marshall County High School.
