= Lewisburg, Tennessee =

- City
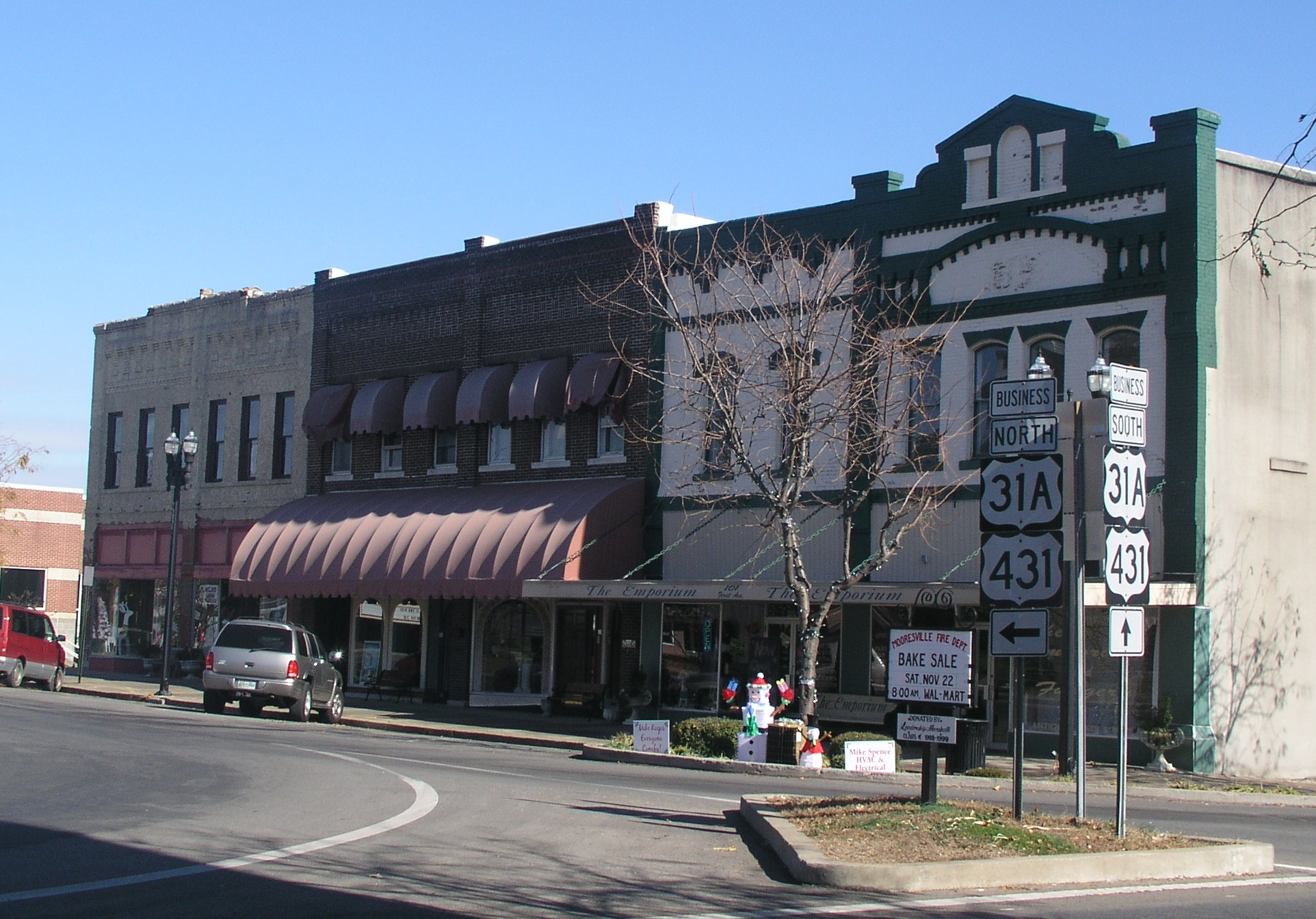
- The town square in Lewisburg

- Flag Seal Logo
- Motto: "The CENTER of Southern Middle Tennessee"
- Location of Lewisburg in Marshall County, Tennessee

- Location in the United States
- Coordinates: 35°26′57″N 86°47′35″W
- Country: United States
- State: Tennessee
- County: Marshall
- Incorporated: 1837
- Named after: Meriwhether Lewis

Government
  - Mayor: Jim Bingham

Area
  - Total: 14.05 sq mi (36.39 km^{2})
  - Land: 14.04 sq mi (36.37 km^{2})
  - Water: 0.0039 sq mi (0.01 km^{2})
- Elevation: 738 ft (225 m)

Population (2020)
  - Total: 12,288
  - Density: 875.0/sq mi (337.83/km^{2})
- Time zone: UTC-6 (Central (CST))
  - Summer (DST): UTC-5 (CDT)
- ZIP code: 37091
- Area code: 931
- FIPS code: 47-41860
- GNIS feature ID: 1291094
- Website: www.lewisburgtn.gov

Lewisburg is a city in and the county seat of Marshall County, Tennessee, United States. The population was 12,288 in 2020. Lewisburg is located in Middle Tennessee, fifty miles south of Nashville and fifty-two miles north of Huntsville, Alabama. Residents have access to the larger cities via nearby I-65 and U.S. 431, the latter of which connects Lewisburg to downtown Huntsville via Fayetteville.

Lewisburg was named for the explorer Meriwether Lewis. By 1838, the town was supporting a newspaper and a bank. The downtown area is similar to many other small southern towns, with a courthouse on a square, surrounded by retail and commercial businesses. Shopping centers are located on the east and west ends of town.

== Geography ==
Lewisburg is located at 35°26′57″N 86°47′35″W (35.449034, -86.793112). According to the United States Census Bureau, the city has a total area of 11.7 square miles (30 km^{2}), almost all of which is land (0.09% is water).

=== Climate ===
Climate data for Lewisburg, Tennessee (1991–2020 normals, extremes 1890–present)
Month	Jan	Feb	Mar	Apr	May	Jun	Jul	Aug	Sep	Oct	Nov	Dec	Year
Record high °F (°C)	77 (25)	82 (28)	89 (32)	91 (33)	98 (37)	109 (43)	112 (44)	108 (42)	108 (42)	99 (37)	88 (31)	78 (26)	112 (44)
Mean maximum °F (°C)	67.2 (19.6)	71.7 (22.1)	78.2 (25.7)	84.6 (29.2)	90.6 (32.6)	94.8 (34.9)	96.9 (36.1)	96.7 (35.9)	94.6 (34.8)	86.8 (30.4)	78.5 (25.8)	68.1 (20.1)	98.6 (37.0)
Mean daily maximum °F (°C)	49.1 (9.5)	54.0 (12.2)	62.6 (17.0)	72.4 (22.4)	80.6 (27.0)	88.0 (31.1)	91.0 (32.8)	90.8 (32.7)	85.4 (29.7)	74.5 (23.6)	62.3 (16.8)	52.3 (11.3)	71.9 (22.2)
Daily mean °F (°C)	38.3 (3.5)	41.9 (5.5)	49.4 (9.7)	58.3 (14.6)	67.4 (19.7)	75.4 (24.1)	78.8 (26.0)	77.5 (25.3)	71.1 (21.7)	59.9 (15.5)	49.1 (9.5)	41.3 (5.2)	59.0 (15.0)
Mean daily minimum °F (°C)	27.5 (−2.5)	29.9 (−1.2)	36.2 (2.3)	44.2 (6.8)	54.2 (12.3)	62.8 (17.1)	66.6 (19.2)	64.1 (17.8)	56.8 (13.8)	45.2 (7.3)	35.8 (2.1)	30.4 (−0.9)	46.1 (7.8)
Mean minimum °F (°C)	8.3 (−13.2)	11.4 (−11.4)	18.6 (−7.4)	26.0 (−3.3)	37.0 (2.8)	48.6 (9.2)	55.4 (13.0)	51.5 (10.8)	39.6 (4.2)	27.8 (−2.3)	18.7 (−7.4)	13.2 (−10.4)	5.5 (−14.7)
Record low °F (°C)	−20 (−29)	−15 (−26)	−5 (−21)	18 (−8)	29 (−2)	38 (3)	43 (6)	39 (4)	31 (−1)	17 (−8)	−2 (−19)	−12 (−24)	−20 (−29)
Average precipitation inches (mm)	4.47 (114)	4.73 (120)	5.56 (141)	5.06 (129)	4.71 (120)	4.87 (124)	4.44 (113)	4.29 (109)	4.52 (115)	3.67 (93)	4.02 (102)	5.73 (146)	56.07 (1,424)
Average snowfall inches (cm)	0.3 (0.76)	0.4 (1.0)	0.1 (0.25)	0.0 (0.0)	0.0 (0.0)	0.0 (0.0)	0.0 (0.0)	0.0 (0.0)	0.0 (0.0)	0.0 (0.0)	0.0 (0.0)	0.1 (0.25)	0.9 (2.3)
Average precipitation days (≥ 0.01 in)	9.3	9.1	10.7	10.0	10.5	10.9	11.4	9.1	7.3	7.9	9.0	9.8	115.0
Average snowy days (≥ 0.1 in)	0.4	0.6	0.3	0.0	0.0	0.0	0.0	0.0	0.0	0.0	0.0	0.4	1.7
Source: NOAA

== Demographics ==
Historical population
Census	Pop.	Note	%±
1870	322		—
1880	460		42.9%
1890	631		37.2%
1900	1,421		125.2%
1910	1,830		28.8%
1920	2,711		48.1%
1930	3,112		14.8%
1940	3,582		15.1%
1950	5,164		44.2%
1960	6,338		22.7%
1970	7,207		13.7%
1980	8,760		21.5%
1990	9,879		12.8%
2000	10,413		5.4%
2010	11,100		6.6%
2020	12,288		10.7%

=== 2020 census ===
As of the 2020 census, Lewisburg had a population of 12,288, with 4,942 households and 2,758 families residing in the city.

The median age was 37.2 years, with 24.3% of residents under the age of 18 and 17.1% of residents 65 years of age or older. For every 100 females there were 90.0 males, and for every 100 females age 18 and over there were 87.2 males age 18 and over.

97.0% of residents lived in urban areas, while 3.0% lived in rural areas.

There were 4,942 households in Lewisburg, of which 31.7% had children under the age of 18 living in them. Of all households, 36.8% were married-couple households, 20.5% were households with a male householder and no spouse or partner present, and 34.2% were households with a female householder and no spouse or partner present. About 31.8% of all households were made up of individuals and 13.1% had someone living alone who was 65 years of age or older.

There were 5,326 housing units, of which 7.2% were vacant. The homeowner vacancy rate was 1.8% and the rental vacancy rate was 6.2%.

Racial composition as of the 2020 census
Race	Number	Percent
White	8,813	71.7%
Black or African American	1,564	12.7%
American Indian and Alaska Native	63	0.5%
Asian	92	0.7%
Native Hawaiian and Other Pacific Islander	11	0.1%
Some other race	602	4.9%
Two or more races	1,143	9.3%
Hispanic or Latino (of any race)	1,347	11.0%

=== 2000 census ===
As of the census of 2000, there was a population of 10,413, with 4,242 households and 2,740 families residing in the city. The population density was 891.5 inhabitants per square mile (344.2/km^{2}). There were 4,584 housing units at an average density of 392.4 units per square mile (151.5 units/km^{2}). The racial makeup of the city was 79.96% White, 15.44% African American, 0.19% Native American, 0.47% Asian, 0.03% Pacific Islander, 2.85% from other races, and 1.06% from two or more races. Hispanic or Latino of any race were 5.15% of the population.

There were 4,242 households, out of which 29.2% had children under the age of 18 living with them, 43.4% were married couples living together, 16.6% had a female householder with no husband present, and 35.4% were non-families. 31.0% of all households were made up of individuals, and 13.7% had someone living alone who was 65 years of age or older. The average household size was 2.38 and the average family size was 2.94.

In the city, the population was spread out, with 24.2% under the age of 18, 10.2% from 18 to 24, 27.3% from 25 to 44, 22.1% from 45 to 64, and 16.3% who were 65 years of age or older. The median age was 37 years. For every 100 females, there were 90.0 males. For every 100 females age 18 and over, there were 86.4 males.

The median income for a household in the city was $31,033, and the median income for a family was $38,246. Males had a median income of $30,619 versus $21,765 for females. The per capita income (the average income a person in the city is earning) was $16,401. About 12.7% of families and 16.1% of the population were below the poverty line, including 20.1% of those under age 18 and 14.2% of those age 65 or over.

== History ==
=== Formation of Lewisburg and Early History (1807–1836) ===
On October 4, 1836, the Marshall County court appointed a committee— which built a county courthouse and jail, which are both known today as the Marshall County Courthouse and the Marshall County Jail. The county court of Marshall County would then sell lots in Lewisburg, some to build houses or for other purposes. Members of the committee were James Osborne, William Williams, Joel Yowell, Aaron Boyd, and James C. Record. When it was formed in 1836, the city of Lewisburg had a land area of approximately 15 square miles Years prior to 1807, no towns or established settlements existed in the area of Marshall County. The territory appeared as an "unbroken wilderness"

There was white violence against freedmen during and after Reconstruction, extending into the early 20th century. Some lynchings of African Americans took place at the Marshall County Courthouse in Lewisburg during the period of highest violence around the turn of the 20th century. Two unidentified black men were lynched without trial in Lewisburg on August 5, 1903. Another account said that John Milligan (Millikin) and John L. Hunter had been killed in Needmore by a mob that week. They are likely the same men.

Until 1925, Lewisburg served the area principally as a trading and shipping center for its livestock and farm produce. As the county seat, it was a center of the justice system and active as a retail center for the area farmers.

The world headquarters of the Tennessee Walking Horse Breeders' and Exhibitors' Association has been based in Lewisburg since 1939. The Tennessee Walking Horse, a gaited breed, is considered to have been developed in Middle Tennessee, and the area is still a center of breeding and exhibitions for this horse.

Marshall County is significant partly because of three men who have served as Governor of Tennessee were living here when they were elected to office: Henry Horton, Jim Nance McCord, and Buford Ellington.

== Education ==
It is served by Marshall County Schools, including Marshall County High School. Various other schools are present however.

== Notable people ==
- Buford Ellington, politician living here; served as governor of the state.
- Marcus Haislip, Marcus Deshon Haislip (born December 22, 1980) is an American professional basketball player who last played for Gaziantep Basketbol of the Turkish Basketball Super League (BSL)
- Dont'a Hightower, born and raised here; professional football player for the New England Patriots. 3x Super Bowl Champion.
- Henry Horton, lived here; farmer and politician who served as governor of the state
- Jason Maxwell, born and raised here; is a former professional baseball player. Primarily an infielder, Maxwell first played in 1998 for the Chicago Cubs.
- Jim Nance McCord, mayor of Lewisburg (1916–1942; publisher of local newspaper; served as governor of Tennessee from 1945 to 1949)
- Grady Martin, rockabilly and country session musician

== Media ==
=== Radio stations ===
- WJJM 94.3 FM
