= Forrest School (Chapel Hill, Tennessee) =

Location
- 310 N. Horton Parkway; Chapel Hill, Tennessee; 37034; United States; 35°37′48″N 86°41′26″W

Information
- Type: Public
- Motto: Class, Pride, Tradition
- School district: Marshall County School District
- Principal: Angie Phifer
- Teaching staff: 45.70 (FTE)
- Grades: 7 to 12
- Enrollment: 803 (2022-2023)
- Student to teacher ratio: 17.57
- Colors: Blue and White
- Athletics conference: TSSAA
- Mascot: Rockets
- Yearbook: The Forrester
- Website: www.mcstn.net/o/fs

Forrest School is a public school in Chapel Hill, Tennessee. It was founded in the year 1924-1925 according to their yearbook, just recently celebrating their 100th anniversary of being established. It serves grades 7-12 and is part of the Marshall County School System. The school is also known as Forrest Middle School for grades 7-8 and Forrest High School for grades 9-12. It is named for Nathan Bedford Forrest, the Confederate general.

== History ==
Forrest School was a K-12 school until Chapel Hill Elementary School And Delk-Henson Intermediate School was established. With Chapel Hill Elementary serving grades K-3 and Delk-Henson serving grades 4-6.

Forrest has gone through several building additions since it was established. The latest was in 2007 when a fire occurred. The school now has additional classrooms, a band room, and a football stadium.

== Athletics ==
Forrest High School competes in TSSAA's Division 1, Class A.

Boys

- Baseball
- Basketball
- Cross Country
- Football
- Golf
- Soccer
- Wrestling

Girls

- Basketball
- Cheerleading
- Cross Country
- Golf
- Soccer
- Softball

=== State championships ===
- 1998 TSSAA Class A Cheerleading Non-Building
- 2006 TSSAA Class A Cheerleading Non-Building
- 2006 TSSAA Class A Girls Basketball
- 2008 TSSAA Class A Girls Softball
- 2015 TSSAA Class A Girls Softball

=== State Honors ===
- 2010 TSSAA Class A Tennessee Miss Basketball - Beth Hawn

== Band ==
- 2007 Division 1 State Marching Band Champions

== Extracurriculars ==
- Art Club
- Beta Club
- Drama Club
- FBLA
- FCA
- FCCLA
- FFA
- Leo Club
- Student Council
- HOSA

== Notable alumni ==
- Mike Minor - Professional baseball player with the Texas Rangers
