= Marshall County, Kentucky =

County in Kentucky, United States

- County
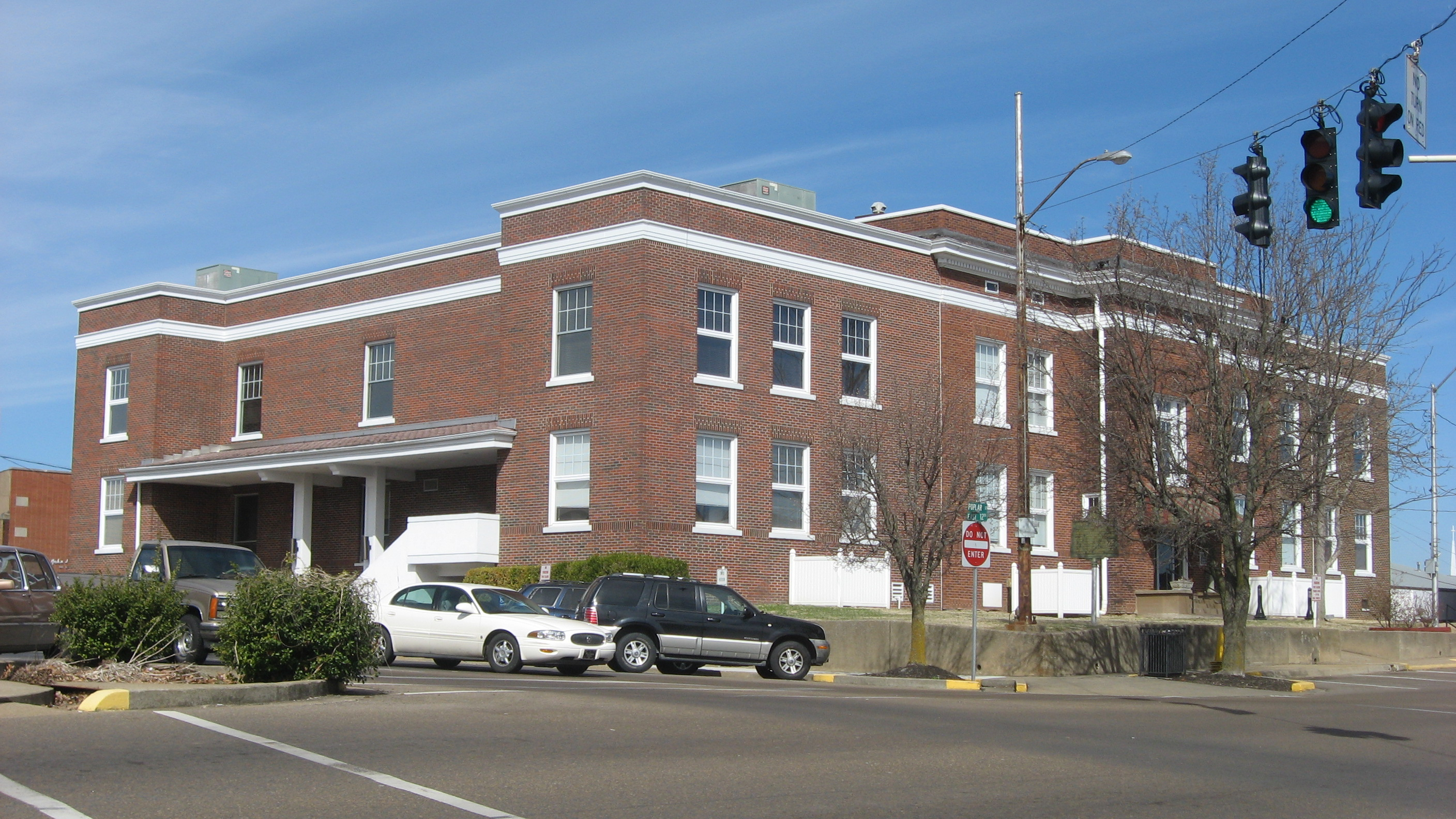
- Marshall County Courthouse in Benton, Kentucky.

- Flag Logo

- Location within the U.S. state of Kentucky
- Coordinates: 36°53′N 88°20′W
- Country: United States
- State: Kentucky
- Founded: 1842
- Named for: John Marshall
- Seat: Benton
- Largest city: Benton

Government
  - Judge/Executive: Kevin Spraggs (R)

Area
  - Total: 340 sq mi (880 km^{2})
  - Land: 301 sq mi (780 km^{2})
  - Water: 39 sq mi (100 km^{2}) 11%

Population (2020)
  - Total: 31,659
  - Estimate (2025): 31,659
  - Density: 105/sq mi (40.6/km^{2})
- Time zone: UTC−6 (Central)
  - Summer (DST): UTC−5 (CDT)
- Congressional district: 1st
- Website: www.marshallcountyky.gov

Marshall County is a county located in the far western portion of the U.S. state of Kentucky. As of the 2020 census, the population was 31,659. Its county seat is Benton.

It is the only Purchase Area county that does not border another state; a narrow strip of land in neighboring Livingston County separates Marshall County from the Ohio River and the Illinois border. Until July 28, 2015, it was a dry county. On that date residents approved alcohol sales for off-premises consumption, making it a "wet" county.

== History ==
Following population increase in the area, Marshall County was created by the Kentucky legislature in 1842 from the northern half of Calloway County. The first European-American settlers had arrived in about 1818, shortly after the area was bought from the Chickasaw Indians as part of the Jackson Purchase by Gen. Andrew Jackson and Kentucky Gov. Isaac Shelby. The Chickasaw were forced under Indian Removal to move to what became known as Indian Territory, new and much less fertile lands west of the Mississippi River.

Marshall County was named in honor of Chief Justice John Marshall of the United States Supreme Court, who had died in 1835.

Like most of the Jackson Purchase, and reflecting its geographic and family connections to the South, during the American Civil War, Marshall County was strongly pro-Confederate, although the state was neutral. Many local men served in the famous Kentucky Orphan Brigade. On March 23, 1864, detachments of Gen. Nathan Bedford Forrest's Confederate cavalry clashed with Union cavalry near Benton, when each side was scouring the countryside for needed cavalry remounts. A state historical marker stands at the site.

From its settlement until the 1930s, Marshall County was developed primarily for agriculture. In the 1940s, however, the Tennessee Valley Authority created Kentucky Lake as part of its flood control and rural electrification projects initiated by President Franklin D. Roosevelt. The lake established tourism as part of the county's economy, and lakeshore resorts were developed to exploit sports fishing.

Kentucky Dam's cheap and plentiful electricity also attracted chemical and manufacturing plants, mainly in the Calvert City area.

The lake's impoundment resulted in flooding two historic Marshall County towns: Birmingham, six miles north of Fairdealing, and Gilbertsville, at the dam's site, both of which were evacuated. Gilbertsville was relocated west of its original location, but Birmingham residents had to find new homes elsewhere. Gilbertsville was an incorporated town until the 1970s, when its charter was dissolved by public vote. Kentucky Lake (created on the Tennessee River) and Lake Barkley (created on the Cumberland River) were connected by a canal. Together they make up one of the largest man-made bodies of water in the world.

== Geography ==
According to the United States Census Bureau, the county has a total area of 340 square miles (880 km^{2}), of which 301 square miles (780 km^{2}) is land and 39 square miles (100 km^{2}) (11%) is water. The county's northeastern border is formed by the Tennessee River and Kentucky Lake.

=== Adjacent counties ===
- Livingston County (north)
- Lyon County (east)
- Trigg County (east)
- Calloway County (south)
- Graves County (west)
- McCracken County (west)

=== National protected area ===
- Clarks River National Wildlife Refuge (part)

== Demographics ==
Historical population
Census	Pop.	Note	%±
1850	5,269		—
1860	6,982		32.5%
1870	9,455		35.4%
1880	9,647		2.0%
1890	11,287		17.0%
1900	13,692		21.3%
1910	15,771		15.2%
1920	15,215		−3.5%
1930	12,889		−15.3%
1940	16,602		28.8%
1950	13,387		−19.4%
1960	16,736		25.0%
1970	20,381		21.8%
1980	25,637		25.8%
1990	27,205		6.1%
2000	30,125		10.7%
2010	31,448		4.4%
2020	31,659		0.7%
2025 (est.)	31,659	Steady	0.0%
U.S. Decennial Census; 1790–1960 1900–1990; 1990–2000 2010–2020

=== 2020 census ===
As of the 2020 census, the county had a population of 31,659. The median age was 45.8 years. 20.6% of residents were under the age of 18 and 22.7% of residents were 65 years of age or older. For every 100 females there were 98.2 males, and for every 100 females age 18 and over there were 95.8 males age 18 and over.

The racial makeup of the county was 94.5% White, 0.3% Black or African American, 0.2% American Indian and Alaska Native, 0.4% Asian, 0.0% Native Hawaiian and Pacific Islander, 0.5% from some other race, and 4.0% from two or more races. Hispanic or Latino residents of any race comprised 1.7% of the population.

14.8% of residents lived in urban areas, while 85.2% lived in rural areas.

There were 13,359 households in the county, of which 26.9% had children under the age of 18 living with them and 23.7% had a female householder with no spouse or partner present. About 28.4% of all households were made up of individuals and 14.1% had someone living alone who was 65 years of age or older.

There were 16,351 housing units, of which 18.3% were vacant. Among occupied housing units, 79.3% were owner-occupied and 20.7% were renter-occupied. The homeowner vacancy rate was 1.8% and the rental vacancy rate was 9.6%.

=== 2000 census ===
As of the census of 2000, there were 30,125 people, 12,412 households, and 8,998 families residing in the county. The population density was 99 per square mile (38/km^{2}). There were 14,730 housing units at an average density of 48 per square mile (19/km^{2}). The racial makeup of the county was 98.57% White, 0.2% Black or African American, 0.17% Native American, 0.15% Asian, 0.01% Pacific Islander, 0.22% from other races, and 0.76% from two or more races. 0.76% of the population were Hispanics or Latinos of any race.

There were 12,412 households, out of which 29.20% had children under the age of 18 living with them, 61.40% were married couples living together, 7.90% had a female householder with no husband present, and 27.50% were non-families. 25.00% of all households were made up of individuals, and 11.90% had someone living alone who was 65 years of age or older. The average household size was 2.38 and the average family size was 2.83.

The age distribution was 21.80% under the age of 18, 7.50% from 18 to 24, 27.00% from 25 to 44, 26.20% from 45 to 64, and 17.50% who were 65 years of age or older. The median age was 41 years. For every 100 females there were 96.10 males. For every 100 females age 18 and over, there were 93.50 males.

The median income for a household in the county was $35,573, and the median income for a family was $43,670. Males had a median income of $36,673 versus $21,941 for females. The per capita income for the county was $18,069. About 6.60% of families and 9.50% of the population were below the poverty line, including 11.60% of those under age 18 and 10.90% of those age 65 or over.

== Communities ==
=== Cities ===
- Benton (county seat)
- Calvert City
- Hardin

=== Census-designated place ===
- Gilbertsville

=== Other unincorporated communities ===
- Aurora
- Big Bear Area
- Brewers
- Briensburg
- Draffenville
- Fairdealing
- Harvey
- Moors Camp Area
- Oak Level
- Olive
- Palma
- Possum Trot
- Sharpe
- Tatumsville

=== Ghost town ===
- Birmingham

== Annual events ==
On the first Monday of April, Benton holds its Tater Day. Originating in 1842 as a day for farmers to gather at the county seat to trade their agricultural goods, today Tater Day is a celebration that includes a festival and parade. Tater Day derives its name from the main item traded—sweet potatoes for seed, i.e., for bedding in prepared "seedbeds" to produce slips for growers to transplant to gardens or fields.

On the fourth Sunday of each May, The Big Singing, an all-day sing-along program of Southern Harmony shape note gospel music is held at the county courthouse. The Big Singing, begun in 1884, has a special claim to fame: in 1933 George Pullen Jackson drew attention to the fact that this is the only regular event that sings from William Walker's Southern Harmony; this remains a living tradition to the present day.

== Attractions and other information ==
Marshall County is the home of Calvert Drive In Theater, the only one in the Purchase area and one of three within an 85-mile radius in far western Kentucky.

Before Interstate 24 rerouted much of US 68 traffic northward, generations spent summer days and nights at The Forgotten Past Amusement Park with its gift shop, go carts, bumper cars, mini golf, museum, and arcade. For many years it hosted an Antique (steel wheeled) Tractor Show.

Marshall County is home to one of the largest and most complete parks in the Purchase area. It has lighted baseball fields, two basketball courts, four soccer fields, two tennis courts, a large fishing pond, large playground, spray park, and multiple picnic pavilions as well as a conference center. It is built upon land donated from a private family in memory of their son who was killed in action in the Vietnam War. In September 2000 the park was dedicated as the Marshall County Park. Later that year the local judge executive Mike Miller appointed the new park board. Upon the Grand Opening the park board had named it Mike Miller Park. Several people protested and the park board renamed it Mike Miller County Park. The original statute dedication as Marshall County Park remains at the entrance of the park. The original park didn't have any mention of veterans in its mission; in response the fiscal court commissioned a large veteran's park adjacent to the main conference center.

Marshall County is home to the FLW Bass Tournament organization, named for founder of Ranger Boats, Forrest L. Wood. Wood is the purveyor of America's largest and most prestigious fishing tournaments, including the FLW Tour, FLW Series, Bass Fishing League, College Fishing and High School Fishing.

== Politics ==
United States presidential election results for Marshall County, Kentucky
Year	Republican		Democratic		Third party(ies)	
Year	No.	%	No.	%	No.	%
1912	634	22.75%	1,675	60.10%	478	17.15%
1916	1,201	34.02%	2,263	64.11%	66	1.87%
1920	1,883	34.29%	3,569	64.99%	40	0.73%
1924	1,192	29.73%	2,752	68.63%	66	1.65%
1928	1,879	47.87%	2,036	51.87%	10	0.25%
1932	863	16.83%	4,246	82.78%	20	0.39%
1936	1,141	24.68%	3,472	75.09%	11	0.24%
1940	1,100	23.60%	3,549	76.13%	13	0.28%
1944	1,316	30.79%	2,947	68.95%	11	0.26%
1948	711	19.25%	2,942	79.66%	40	1.08%
1952	1,474	29.87%	3,445	69.82%	15	0.30%
1956	2,015	31.57%	4,358	68.29%	9	0.14%
1960	3,388	49.30%	3,484	50.70%	0	0.00%
1964	1,679	21.90%	5,968	77.83%	21	0.27%
1968	2,432	30.70%	3,301	41.67%	2,188	27.62%
1972	4,290	59.16%	2,806	38.69%	156	2.15%
1976	2,578	26.82%	6,906	71.83%	130	1.35%
1980	4,403	40.85%	6,231	57.81%	145	1.35%
1984	5,152	47.19%	5,725	52.44%	40	0.37%
1988	5,256	47.05%	5,888	52.71%	27	0.24%
1992	4,368	34.26%	6,576	51.58%	1,805	14.16%
1996	4,579	37.91%	6,054	50.12%	1,445	11.96%
2000	7,294	53.00%	6,203	45.08%	264	1.92%
2004	9,049	58.30%	6,383	41.12%	89	0.57%
2008	9,512	61.42%	5,683	36.70%	292	1.89%
2012	10,402	66.17%	5,022	31.95%	295	1.88%
2016	12,322	73.79%	3,672	21.99%	704	4.22%
2020	13,297	75.54%	4,071	23.13%	235	1.33%
2024	13,677	77.70%	3,700	21.02%	225	1.28%

=== Elected officials ===
Elected officials as of January 3, 2025
U.S. House	James Comer (R)	KY 1
Ky. Senate	Danny Carroll (R)	2
Ky. House	Chris Freeland (R)	6

== Notable people ==
- Joe Creason – Longtime reporter and columnist for the Louisville Courier Journal
- J. J. Edens - served in the Washington State Senate from 1889 to 1895.
- Robert H. Grubbs - Winner of the 2005 Nobel Prize in Chemistry.
- Vernon Rudolph - Founder of Krispy Kreme Doughnuts, Inc.
- Terrina Chrishell Stause - American actress.

== See also ==
- Marshall County Schools
- Eggner Ferry Bridge
- Dry counties
- Kaintuck Territory
- National Register of Historic Places listings in Marshall County, Kentucky
- Sacred Harp
