= Dont'a Hightower =

American football player (born 1990)

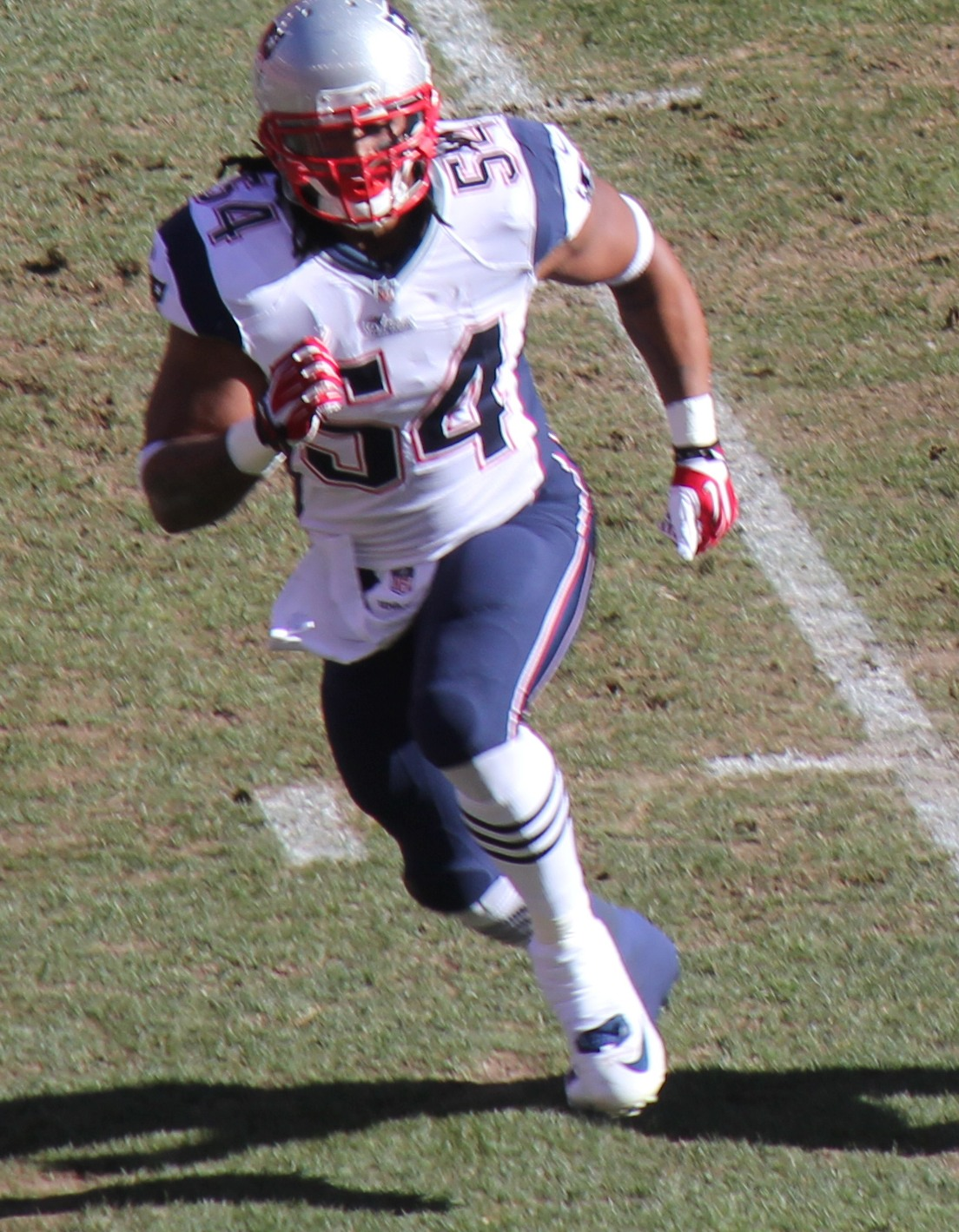
- Hightower with the New England Patriots in 2014

No. 45, 54
- Position: Linebacker

Personal information
- Born: March 12, 1990 (age 36); Lewisburg, Tennessee, U.S.
- Listed height: 6 ft 3 in (1.91 m)
- Listed weight: 260 lb (118 kg)

Career information
- High school: Marshall County (Lewisburg)
- College: Alabama (2008–2011)
- NFL draft: 2012: 1st round, 25th overall pick

Career history

Playing
- New England Patriots (2012–2021)

Coaching
- New England Patriots (2024) Inside linebackers coach

Awards and highlights
- 3× Super Bowl champion (XLIX, LI, LIII); Second-team All-Pro (2016); 2× Pro Bowl (2016, 2019); New England Patriots All-2010s Team; New England Patriots All-Dynasty Team; 2× BCS national champion (2009, 2011); Consensus All-American (2011); First-team All-SEC (2011); Second-team All-SEC (2010)

Career NFL statistics
- Total tackles: 569
- Sacks: 27.0
- Pass deflections: 18
- Interceptions: 1
- Forced fumbles: 2
- Fumble recoveries: 5
- Defensive touchdowns: 2
- Stats at Pro Football Reference

Qualin Dont'a Hightower (born March 12, 1990) is an American football coach and former linebacker who played in the National Football League (NFL) for nine seasons with the New England Patriots. Hightower played college football for the Alabama Crimson Tide, earning consensus All-American honors and winning two BCS National Championships. Selected by New England in the first round of the 2012 NFL draft, he received two Pro Bowl selections and was named a second-team All-Pro, in addition to winning three Super Bowl titles. After retiring, he served as the inside linebackers coach for the Patriots in 2024.

== Early life ==
Hightower was born in Lewisburg, Tennessee. He attended Marshall County High School in Lewisburg, where he played for the Marshall County Tigers high school football team. He first drew recognition his sophomore year when the team's starting running back quit the team. In the last four games of the season, he rushed for over 1,000 yards and seven touchdowns. After growing to 6 ft 2 in (1.88 m) prior to his junior year, Hightower was moved to linebacker and tight end. He collected 98 tackles, two sacks, and seven forced fumbles as a linebacker and caught 18 passes for 253 yards and four touchdowns at tight end.

Having grown to six feet, three inches tall as a senior, Hightower again switched positions to defensive end. After recording 168 tackles (14 for loss), five forced fumbles, five interceptions and four fumble recoveries, he was named 3A Mr. Football Lineman of the Year and The Tennesseans Defensive Most Valuable Player in 2007. He also added 875 yards and 19 touchdowns on offense.

Hightower was selected to play in the U.S. Army East West All-Star Game in San Antonio, Texas.

Considered a four-star recruit by Rivals.com, Hightower was listed as the No. 15 inside linebacker in the nation in 2008. He chose Alabama over Auburn, Georgia Tech, Tennessee, and Vanderbilt.

== College career ==
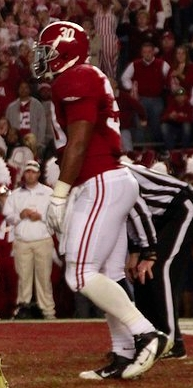
Hightower during the 2011 LSU vs. Alabama football game.

"Dont'a [Hightower] can play any position on the field. He's a freak to me."

— Alabama teammate Rolando McClain.

Hightower attended the University of Alabama, where he played for the Crimson Tide football team from 2008 to 2011.

=== 2008 season ===
As one of only two true freshmen to be regular starter for the Crimson Tide in 2008, Hightower started 12 games while playing in all 14 at weakside inside linebacker ("Will") in Alabama's 3–4 defense, next to Rolando McClain who occupied the other inside linebacker spot ("Mike"). Hightower recorded 64 tackles (4th on the team) and 2.5 tackles for loss, while also having one forced fumble and two fumble recoveries. He had at least one tackle in each game and had five or more stops in seven of 14 games, including 10 against Tulane and a career-high 11 at LSU. He was subsequently named to numerous Freshman All-American teams.

=== 2009 season ===
For the 2009 season, during the Arkansas game, Hightower suffered a knee injury in the first quarter when he was cut blocked by an Arkansas lineman. He was diagnosed a torn anterior cruciate ligament in his left knee and missed the rest of the season with surgery. True freshman Nico Johnson replaced him at weak side linebacker. Hightower recorded 16 tackles including four tackles for loss. Having played only four games, he was granted a medical redshirt making him a redshirt sophomore in 2010.

=== 2010 season ===
Returning for the 2010 season, Hightower was expected to "be the nucleus of a young defense". He replaced McClain as Alabama's middle linebacker.

=== 2011 season ===
In 2011, he captained a defense that ranked No. 1 nationally in all five major categories—scoring defense (8.8 ppg), total defense (191.3 ypg), rushing defense (74.9 ypg), pass efficiency defense (83.9 ypg) and pass defense (116.3 ypg). Hightower led the team with a career-best 81 tackles, including 37 solo stops, as well as three sacks (−16 yards) and 9.5 tackles for loss (−35 yards). He also registered eight quarterback hurries, one interception, one blocked field goal and three pass breakups.

Hightower was a consensus first-team All-American by the Associated Press, AFCA and Walter Camp as well as Rivals.com and Pro Football Weekly. He was also a finalist for the Lombardi Award, Chuck Bednarik Award, the Butkus Award, and the Lott Trophy.

== Professional career ==
=== Pre-draft ===
As early as April 2011, Hightower was projected a potential first-round draft pick in the 2012 NFL draft. Shortly after the 2012 BCS National Championship Game, he announced his decision to forgo his final year of eligibility. Right after the season ended, he was projected a late first-round selection. After solid performances at the NFL Combine and Alabama Pro Day, he was still regarded as a late first-rounder.

External videos
- Dont'a Hightower's NFL Combine workout

Pre-draft measurables
Height	Weight	Arm length	Hand span	Wingspan	40-yard dash	10-yard split	20-yard split	20-yard shuttle	Three-cone drill	Vertical jump	Broad jump
6 ft 2 1/4 in (1.89 m)	265 lb (120 kg)	32 5/8 in (0.83 m)	9 3/4 in (0.25 m)	6 ft 6 1/2 in (1.99 m)	4.68 s	1.66 s	2.74 s	4.64 s	7.55 s	32 in (0.81 m)	9 ft 9 in (2.97 m)
All values from NFL Combine/Alabama's Pro Day

=== 2012 ===
The New England Patriots selected Hightower in the first round (25th overall) of the 2012 NFL draft. He was the third linebacker selected in 2012, behind Boston College's Luke Kuechly (9th overall) and South Carolina's Melvin Ingram (18th overall).

External videos
- Patriots select Dont'a Hightower

On July 19, 2012, the Patriots signed Hightower to a four-year, $7.72 million contract that includes $6.28 million guaranteed and a signing bonus of $4.05 million.

Throughout training camp, he competed for the job as the starting strongside linebacker against Rob Ninkovich. Head coach Bill Belichick named him the opening day starter, alongside Jerod Mayo and middle linebacker Brandon Spikes.

He made his first career start and professional regular season debut in the New England Patriots' season-opener at the Tennessee Titans and recorded five combined tackles and returned a fumble recovery for a six-yard touchdown during their 34–13 victory. His touchdown in the second quarter marked the first of his career. On September 30, 2012, he recorded two solo tackles and made his first career sack on quarterback Ryan Fitzpatrick, before leaving in the first half of their 52–28 victory at the Buffalo Bills due to a hamstring injury. The injury sidelined him for the next two games (Weeks 5–6). In Week 7, Hightower collected a season-high seven solo tackles and sacked Mark Sanchez as the Patriots defeated the New York Jets 29–26 in overtime. On December 16, 2012, Hightower made a season-high eight combined tackles and broke up a pass during their 41–34 loss to the San Francisco 49ers. He finished the 2012 season with 60 combined tackles (43 solo), four sacks, three pass deflections, two fumble recoveries, and a touchdown in 14 games and 13 starts.

The New England Patriots finished the 2012 season atop the AFC East with a 12–4 record, clinching home field advantage and a first round bye. On January 13, 2013, Hightower started his first career playoff game and recorded three combined tackles in the Patriots' 41–28 victory against the Houston Texans in the Divisional Round. The following week, he made three combined tackles as the Patriots lost 28–13 to the eventual Super Bowl champions, the Baltimore Ravens, in the AFC Championship.

=== 2013 ===
Defensive coordinator Matt Patricia retained Hightower, Mayo, and Spikes as the starting linebackers to begin the 2013 regular season.

On October 20, 2013, Hightower recorded 11 combined tackles (seven solo) during a 30–27 loss at the New York Jets. The following week, he collected ten combined tackles (five solo) and sacked quarterback Ryan Tannehill in the Patriots' 27–17 win against the Miami Dolphins. In Week 14, he tied his season-high of 11 combined tackles (seven solo) in a 27–26 win against the Cleveland Browns. He finished the 2013 season with 97 combined tackles (55 solo), three pass deflections, and a sack in 16 games and 14 starts.

The New England Patriots clinched another AFC East title with a 12–4 record and received a first round bye. On January 11, 2014, Hightower collected eight combined tackles, broke up a pass, and intercepted a pass by Andrew Luck during a 43–22 win against the Indianapolis Colts in the Divisional Round. The following week, he made eight combined tackles as the Patriots lost 26–16 to the Denver Broncos in the AFC Championship game.

=== 2014 ===
During training camp, Hightower was moved to weakside linebacker, replacing Jerod Mayo who was named the starting middle linebacker after the departure of Brandon Spikes. Head coach Bill Belichick named Hightower and Jamie Collins Sr. the starting outside linebackers to start the regular season with Jerod Mayo starting at middle linebacker.

On September 14, 2014, Hightower recorded eight combined tackles, broke up a pass, and had two sacks on Matt Cassel during the Patriots' 30–7 victory at the Minnesota Vikings. It marked his first career multi-sack game. Hightower missed two consecutive games (Weeks 5–6) due to a knee. In Week 7, he recorded a season-high 13 combined tackles (nine solo) and a sack in the Patriots' 27–25 win against the New York Jets. In Week 13, Hightower recorded ten combined tackles (four solo) and a sack on Aaron Rodgers during a 26–21 loss at the Green Bay Packers. He missed the following game (Week 14) due to a shoulder injury he sustained against the Packers. Hightower also missed the Patriots' Week 17 loss against the Buffalo Bills after aggravating his shoulder injury. Hightower finished the 2014 season with 89 combined tackles (51 solo), six sacks, two pass deflections, and a forced fumble in 12 games and 12 starts.

The New England Patriots finished atop the AFC East with a 12–4 record and clinched home field advantage and a first round bye. They defeated the Baltimore Ravens in the AFC Divisional Round and the Indianapolis Colts in the AFC Championship and went on to Super Bowl XLIX. On February 1, 2015, Hightower started in Super Bowl XLIX and recorded five combined tackles during the Patriots' 28–24 victory against the Seattle Seahawks. He made a key play near the end of the fourth quarter, tackling Marshawn Lynch at the one-yard line to prevent a touchdown that would have given the Seahawks the lead, and likely the title. The Patriots secured their victory on the next play after teammate Malcolm Butler intercepted a pass by Russell Wilson. Because Butler caught the ball inside the one yard line, Hightower ensured he got out of the end zone to prevent a safety.

=== 2015 ===
On April 30, 2015, the New England Patriots exercised the fifth-year, $7.751 million option on Hightower's rookie contract.

In Week 2, Hightower recorded a season-high 12 combined tackles (eight solo) and was credited with half a sack during a 40–32 win at the Buffalo Bills. On November 29, 2015, Hightower collected three combined tackles, but left the Patriots' 30–24 loss at the Denver Broncos after suffering a sprained MCL in his left knee. He went on to miss the next two games (Weeks 13–14) due to the injury to his MCL. Hightower was inactive for the Patriots' Week 17 loss at the Miami Dolphins due to a sprained MCL injury he aggravated the previous week. He finished the season with 61 combined tackles (51 solo), 3.5 sacks, two passes defended, and a fumble recovery in 12 games and 12 starts.

The Patriots clinched another AFC East title with a 12–4 record and had a rematch with the Broncos in the AFC Championship, but lost to the eventual Super Bowl champions by a score of 20–18.

=== 2016 ===
Hightower entered training camp as the starting middle linebacker after Jerod Mayo announced his retirement. Head coach Bill Belichick officially named Hightower the starting middle linebacker to start the regular season, alongside outside linebackers Jamie Collins and Jonathan Freeny. The New England Patriots announced Hightower was selected to be one of four team captains to represent the Patriots for the season.

He started the New England Patriots' season-opener at the Arizona Cardinals, but left in the second quarter of their 23–21 victory with an MCL injury. The following day, it was reported that Hightower had suffered a slight tear to his meniscus and was sidelined for the next two games (Weeks 2–3). On October 16, 2016, Hightower registered 13 combined tackles (ten solo), 1.5 sacks, and recorded his first career safety on a sack on Bengals' quarterback Andy Dalton during their 35–17 victory against the Cincinnati Bengals. He was voted as the AFC Defensive Player of the Week for his Week 6 performance against the Bengals. On December 20, 2016, it was announced that Hightower was named to the 2017 Pro Bowl, marking the first of his career Hightower finished the 2016 season with 65 combined tackles (31 solo), 2.5 sacks, two passes defensed, and a safety in 13 games and 13 starts. Hightower received enough votes from his peers to finish 94th on the NFL Top 100 Players of 2017.

The New England Patriots finished atop the AFC East and clinched a first round bye and a playoff berth with a 14–2 record. They went on to defeat the Houston Texans in the Divisional Round and the Pittsburgh Steelers in the AFC Championship. On February 5, 2017, Hightower appeared in Super Bowl LI and helped the Patriots overcome a 25-point deficit and defeat the Atlanta Falcons 34–28 in overtime. Hightower recorded two solo tackles, one sack, and forced a fumble deep in Atlanta territory which was recovered by the Patriots to help make it a one-possession game.

=== 2017 ===
On March 15, 2017, the New England Patriots signed Hightower to a four-year, $35.5 million contract that includes $17 million guaranteed and a $10 million signing bonus. It was later reported that Hightower met with the Pittsburgh Steelers and New York Jets, but failed a physical with the Jets due to a slight tear in his pectoral muscle.

Head coach Bill Belichick named him the starting middle linebacker, along with outside linebackers David Harris and Kyle Van Noy. Hightower was the only returning starter after the Patriots traded Jamie Collins and Jonathan Freeny departed in free agency.

He started the New England Patriots' season-opener against the Kansas City Chiefs, but left their 42–27 loss in the second quarter after sustaining a knee injury. The knee injury unfortunately sidelined Hightower for the next two games (Weeks 2–3). On October 15, 2017, Hightower recorded a season-high seven combined tackles and a sack as the Patriots defeated the New York Jets 24–17. In Week 7, he made one solo tackle in the Patriots' 23–7 win against the Atlanta Falcons before leaving in the third quarter with a shoulder injury. The following day, it was announced that it was discovered to be a torn pectoral muscle and would likely sideline Hightower for the remainder of the season. On November 7, 2017, the New England Patriots placed Hightower on injured reserve for the remainder of the season. Hightower finished the 2017 season with 14 combined tackles (12 solo) and two sacks in five games and five starts.

The Patriots replaced Hightower with Elandon Roberts and managed to finish the season atop the AFC East with a 13–3 record. They went on to defeat the Tennessee Titans in the AFC Divisional Round and the Jacksonville Jaguars in the AFC Championship game before losing 41–33 to the Philadelphia Eagles in Super Bowl LII.

=== 2018 ===
Hightower returned as a starter in 2018, alongside Kyle Van Noy and rookie Ja'Whaun Bentley. In Week 7, He blocked a punt that was recovered by Van Noy and returned for a touchdown, earning him AFC Special Teams Player of the Week. He finished the 2018 season with one sack, 48 total tackles, one interception, one pass defensed, and one fumble recovery in 15 starts. The Patriots finished the season 11–5, again clinching the AFC East. During Super Bowl LIII against the Los Angeles Rams, Hightower finished with two sacks and a pass deflection as the Patriots won 13–3.

=== 2019 ===
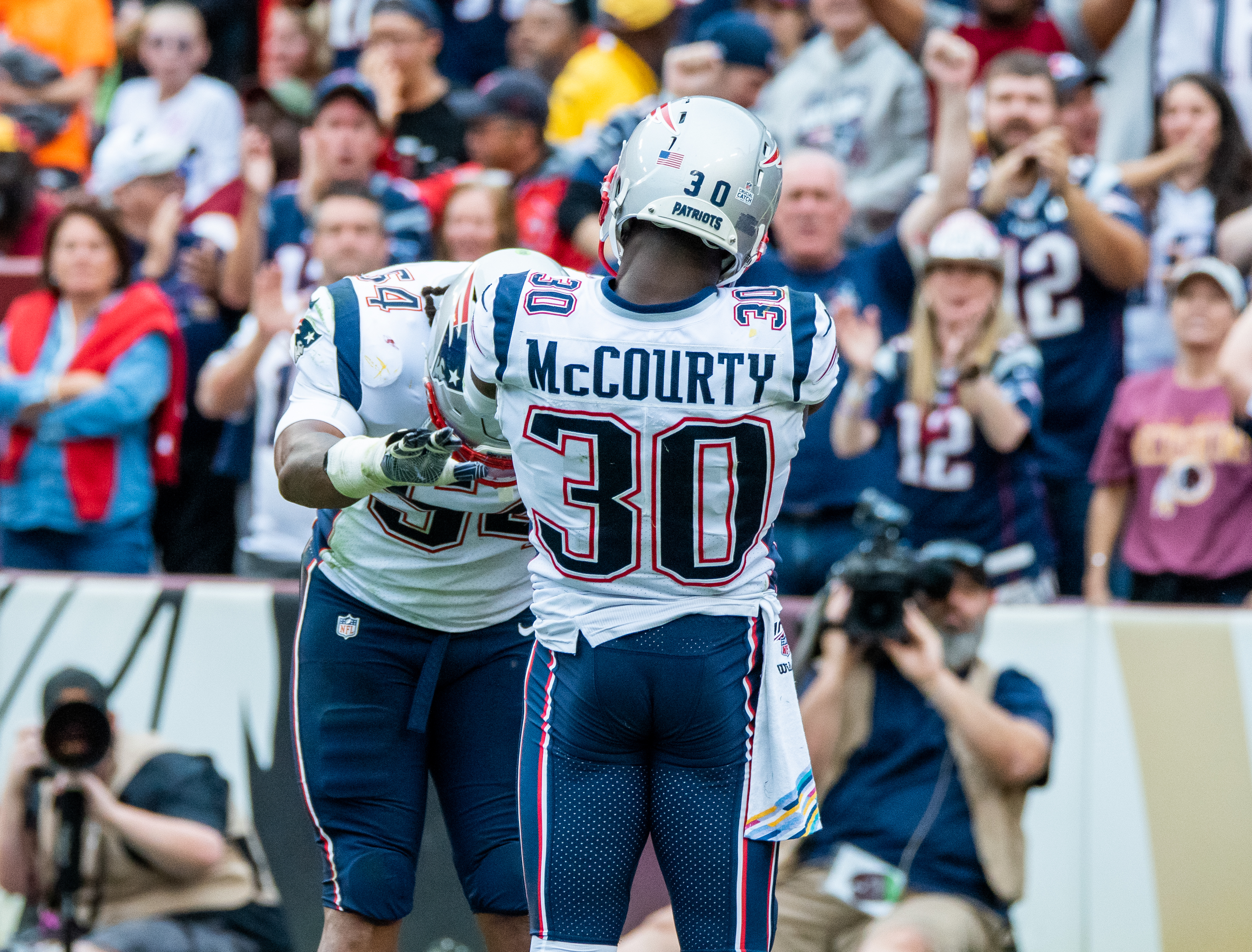
Hightower in a game against the Washington Redskins

In Week 5 against the Washington Redskins, Hightower recorded a team-high eight tackles and sacked Colt McCoy 1.5 times in the 33–7 win. In Week 8 against the Cleveland Browns, Hightower recovered a fumble lost by running back Nick Chubb and returned it for a touchdown in the 27–13 win. This was his first touchdown since Week 1 of the 2012 season. In the 2019 season, Hightower appeared in and started 15 games. He recorded 5.5 sacks, 71 total tackles, four passes defensed, and one fumble recovery for a touchdown.

=== 2020 ===
On August 2, 2020, Hightower announced his intention to opt out of the 2020 season, due to concerns over the ongoing COVID-19 pandemic.

=== 2021 ===
In 2021, Hightower returned to the Patriots and played in 15 of the 17 regular season games and their Wild Card Round game against Buffalo. He finished with 64 total tackles, 1.5 sacks, and one pass defensed on the year. His contract expired on March 16, 2022.

=== Retirement ===
After not playing the entire 2022 season, Hightower announced his retirement on March 21, 2023.

== Career statistics ==
Legend
	Won the Super Bowl
**Bold**	Career high

=== NFL ===
Year	Team	Games		Tackles					Interceptions						Fumbles		
Year	Team	GP	GS	Cmb	Solo	Ast	Sck	Sfty	PD	Int	Yds	Avg	Lng	TD	FF	FR	TD
2012	NE	14	13	60	43	17	4.0	0	**3**	0	0	0.0	0	0	0	**2**	**1**
2013	NE	16	14	**113**	**65**	**48**	1.0	0	**3**	0	0	0.0	0	0	0	0	0
2014	NE	12	12	105	61	44	**6.0**	0	2	0	0	0.0	0	0	**1**	0	0
2015	NE	12	12	61	51	10	3.5	0	2	0	0	0.0	0	0	0	1	0
2016	NE	13	13	65	31	34	2.5	**1**	2	0	0	0.0	0	0	**1**	0	0
2017	NE	5	5	14	12	2	2.0	0	0	0	0	0.0	0	0	0	0	0
2018	NE	15	15	48	24	24	1.0	0	1	**1**	**27**	**27.0**	**27**	0	0	1	0
2019	NE	15	15	71	47	24	5.5	0	**4**	0	0	0.0	0	0	0	1	**1**
2020	NE	0	0	Did not play due to Covid-19 opt-out													
2021	NE	15	15	64	39	25	1.5	0	1	0	0	0.0	0	0	0	0	0
Total		117	114	569	353	216	27.0	1	18	1	27	27.0	27	0	2	5	2

=== College ===
Season	Games		Tackles					Sacks			Interceptions				Fumbles			Kick Blk
Season	GP	GS	Cmb	Solo	Ast	TfL	Yds	Sck	Yds	QBH	Int	Yds	BU	PD	FF	FR	Yds	Kick Blk
2008	14	12	64	26	38	2.5	6	0.0	0	6	0	0	0	0	**1**	**2**	**8**	0
2009	4	4	16	5	11	4.0	7	1.0	4	2	0	0	1	1	0	0	0	0
2010	14	14	70	30	40	3.5	8	0.0	0	9	**1**	2	**3**	**5**	**1**	0	0	0
2011	13	13	**85**	**40**	**45**	**11.0**	**46**	**4.0**	**26**	**8**	**1**	**29**	**3**	4	**1**	0	0	**1**
Total	55	53	235	101	134	21.0	67	5.0	30	25	2	31	7	10	3	2	8	1

== Coaching career ==
On February 9, 2024, Hightower announced he had accepted a position as the inside linebackers coach on the staff of new Patriots head coach and Hightower’s former teammate, Jerod Mayo. Hightower was not retained by the Patriots after Mayo's firing.
