= J. J. Edens =

American politician from Washington State (1840–1914)

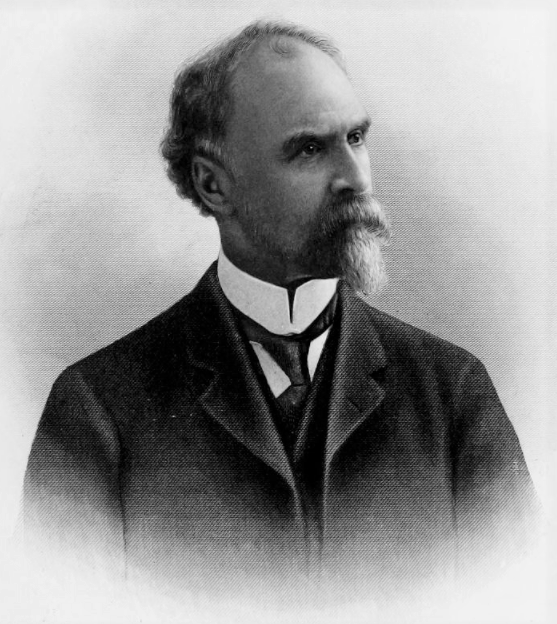

Member of the Washington State Senate for the 32nd district
- In office 1889–1895

Personal details
- Born: June 30, 1840 Marshall County, Kentucky, United States
- Died: December 24, 1914 (aged 74) Bellingham, Washington, United States
- Party: Republican

John James Edens (June 30, 1840 – December 24, 1914) was an American politician in the state of Washington. He served in the Washington State Senate from 1889 to 1895.
