= Jason Maxwell =

American baseball player (born 1972)

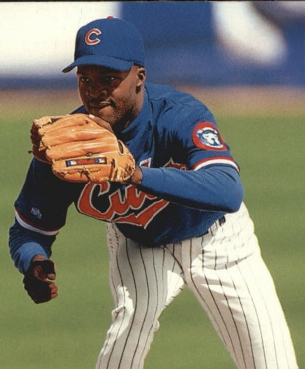
- Infielder
- Born: March 26, 1972 (age 54); Lewisburg, Tennessee, U.S.
- Batted: Right Threw: Right

MLB debut
- September 1, 1998, for the Chicago Cubs

Last MLB appearance
- October 7, 2001, for the Minnesota Twins

MLB statistics
- Batting average: .225
- Home runs: 3
- Runs batted in: 23
- Stats at Baseball Reference

Teams
- Chicago Cubs (1998); Minnesota Twins (2000–2001)

Jason Ramond Maxwell (born March 26, 1972) is an American former professional baseball player. Primarily an infielder, Maxwell first played in 1998 for the Chicago Cubs. Maxwell played the 2000 and 2001 seasons with the Minnesota Twins. Maxwell attended Marshall County High School in Lewisburg, TN, where he played high school baseball for the Tigers. Maxwell is now the Head Baseball Coach and Athletic Director for Ensworth High School in Nashville, TN. He has also coached several U15 and U18 teams for USA Baseball. Some of his favorite players from the USA development program include Royce Lewis, Anthony Volpe and Dylan Crews. Maxwell recommended that his former club, the Twins, select Lewis with the first overall pick in the 2017 MLB draft.
