= Mike Minor (baseball) =

American baseball player (born 1987)

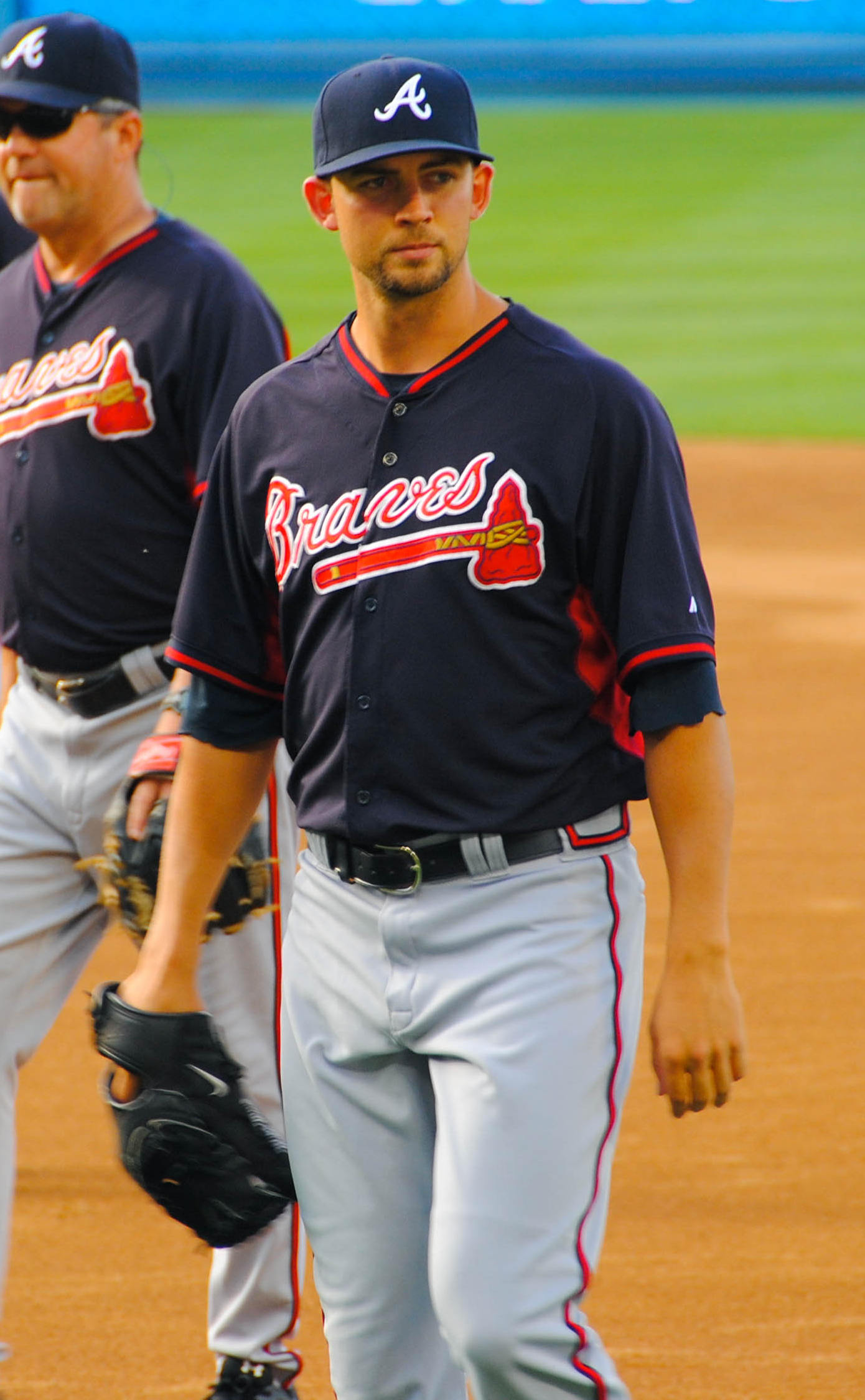
- Minor with the Atlanta Braves in 2014
- Pitcher
- Born: December 26, 1987 (age 38); Chapel Hill, Tennessee, U.S.
- Batted: Right Threw: Left

MLB debut
- August 9, 2010, for the Atlanta Braves

Last MLB appearance
- September 17, 2022, for the Cincinnati Reds

MLB statistics
- Win–loss record: 83–90
- Earned run average: 4.25
- Strikeouts: 1,273
- Stats at Baseball Reference

Teams
- Atlanta Braves (2010–2014); Kansas City Royals (2017); Texas Rangers (2018–2020); Oakland Athletics (2020); Kansas City Royals (2021); Cincinnati Reds (2022)

Career highlights and awards
- All-Star (2019)
Medals
Men's baseball
Representing United States
Pan American Games
Silver medal – second place	2007 Rio de Janeiro	Team
World University Championship
Gold medal – first place	2008 Brno	Team

Michael David Minor (born December 26, 1987) is an American former professional baseball pitcher. He played in Major League Baseball (MLB) for the Atlanta Braves, Kansas City Royals, Texas Rangers, Oakland Athletics, and Cincinnati Reds. Minor played college baseball at Vanderbilt University and was selected by the Braves with the seventh overall pick in the 2009 MLB draft.

== Early life ==
Minor had an outstanding high school career at Forrest School in Chapel Hill, Tennessee and was drafted in the 13th round of the 2006 Major League Baseball draft by the Tampa Bay Devil Rays after his senior season. However, he did not sign, choosing to attend Vanderbilt University.

== College career ==
Minor played at Vanderbilt University with fellow future first round draft picks Pedro Alvarez and David Price.

=== Awards and honors ===
- 2007 Collegiate Baseball Freshman All-American
- 2007 Rivals.com Freshman All-American
- 2007 SEC All-Freshman Team
- 2007 SEC Freshman of the Year
- 2007 Second Team All-SEC
- 2008 Best pitcher Haarlem Baseball Week
- 2008 National Collegiate Baseball Writers Association Second Team Pre-season All-America Team
- 2009 Louisville Slugger Second Team Pre-season All-American
- 2009 National Collegiate Baseball Writers Association Second Team Pre-season All-America Team
- 2009 SEC Pitcher of the Week – Week 8

== United States National Team ==
Minor pitched for the United States National Team (Collegiate) in 2007 and 2008.

One highlight of the 2008 season was his earning the 4–1 win over Cuba in the championship game of the Haarlem Baseball Week tournament in The Netherlands. This victory marked the first time in recorded history that a United States Collegiate National Team has defeated the Cuba Olympic Team in a tournament title game. In the 2008 World University Baseball Championship held in Brno, Czech Republic, Minor led Team USA to its third gold medal alongside Stephen Strasburg. In the tournament, he was 1–0 with a 1.15 ERA and 16 strikeouts, allowing eight hits in 15 2/3 innings for Team USA. In 2008, he was named Baseball America's Summer Player of the Year.

== Professional career ==
=== Atlanta Braves ===
Minor was drafted by the Atlanta Braves in the first round (seventh overall) in the 2009 Major League Baseball draft and represented the United States in the 2010 All-Star Futures Game.

Minor made his major-league debut on August 9, 2010, against the Houston Astros. He recorded his first strikeout against Chris Johnson. On the night, he went six innings giving up five hits and four runs (three earned) while walking one and striking out five batters; he got a no-decision. In his next start, on August 17, Minor went six innings, giving up five hits and two earned runs, and earned his first major league victory. In his third career start, against the Chicago Cubs, Minor went six innings, giving up three earned runs while striking out 12, picking up his second career victory. Those 12 strikeouts set an Atlanta Braves rookie strikeout record in a single game; surpassing Tommy Hanson's 11 strikeouts in 2009. On August 18, 2011, in a game against the San Francisco Giants, Minor pitched six scoreless innings, including facing the minimum number of batters over the last four innings. This victory was the first time in 17 major league starts that Minor did not give up a run.

On May 25, 2013, Minor hit his first career home run off Dillon Gee of the New York Mets in a 6–0 Braves win.

On August 22, 2014, Minor pitched 7 2/3 no-hit innings, before giving up an RBI single to the Reds' Billy Hamilton. The Braves eventually won the game in the 12th inning on Justin Upton's two-run home run. Minor finished the 2014 season with a 6–12 record and 4.77 ERA, pitching most of the year with a sore shoulder.

In 2015, Minor became the first Brave since John Rocker in 2001 to challenge the team in an arbitration hearing. He won, and was awarded $5.6 million. On March 3, 2015, Minor again began feeling tightness in his shoulder and was diagnosed with rotator cuff inflammation. As a result, he was placed on the disabled list on March 10. Minor attempted to start throwing programs in mid-March and early April, but felt discomfort both times. He was moved to the 60-day disabled list on May 2. Eleven days later, Minor underwent surgery for a torn labrum, and missed the rest of the season.

Minor became a free agent on December 2, 2015, when the Braves opted not to tender him a contract.

=== Kansas City Royals ===
On February 19, 2016, Minor signed a two-year contract with the Kansas City Royals. It contained a base salary of $7.25 million, with a club option worth $10 million for the 2018 season. Minor started the 2016 season on the disabled list. The Royals planned for Minor to return in the second half of the season, but persistent fatigue and discomfort in his shoulder forced Minor to stay on the disabled list for the rest of the season.

Because of his troubles staying healthy, the Royals announced that Minor would pitch out of the bullpen in 2017. A move to relief brought tremendous results for Minor, who saw his average fastball velocity climb to nearly 95 miles per hour, compared to 91 miles per hour as a starter. Minor would emerge as one of the Royals best relievers, finishing with a 2.55 ERA and six saves, with 88 strikeouts in 77 2/3 innings.

After the season was over Minor announced his intention to return to starting in 2018, despite his 2017 success as a reliever.

=== Texas Rangers ===
On December 4, 2017, Minor signed with the Texas Rangers to a three-year, $28 million deal. In 2018, Minor went 12–8 with a 4.18 ERA and 110 strikeouts in 157 innings.

In 2019, after posting an MLB-leading 2.40 ERA in his first 17 starts, Minor was selected as an American League pitcher for the 2019 Major League Baseball All-Star Game. However, because he was scheduled to start the Sunday before the All-Star Game, he did not play. Minor finished the 2019 season with a record of 14–10, a 3.59 ERA, and 200 strikeouts, over 208 2/3 innings. Minor finished 8th in the 2019 AL Cy Young Award voting.

=== Oakland Athletics ===
On August 31, 2020, Minor was traded to the Oakland Athletics in exchange for Dustin Harris and Marcus Smith.

=== Kansas City Royals (second stint) ===
On December 1, 2020, Minor signed a two-year, $18 million contract to return to the Kansas City Royals, with a $13 million club option for the 2023 season and a $1 million buyout.

In 2021, Minor posted an 8–12 record with a 5.05 ERA and 149 strikeouts over 158 2/3 innings in 28 starts.

=== Cincinnati Reds ===
On March 16, 2022, Minor was traded to the Cincinnati Reds in exchange for LHP Amir Garrett. In 19 starts for Cincinnati, he struggled to a 4–12 record and 6.06 ERA with 76 strikeouts across 98 innings pitched. On November 8, the Reds declined Minor's mutual option for the 2023 season, and he became a free agent.

== Pitch repertoire ==
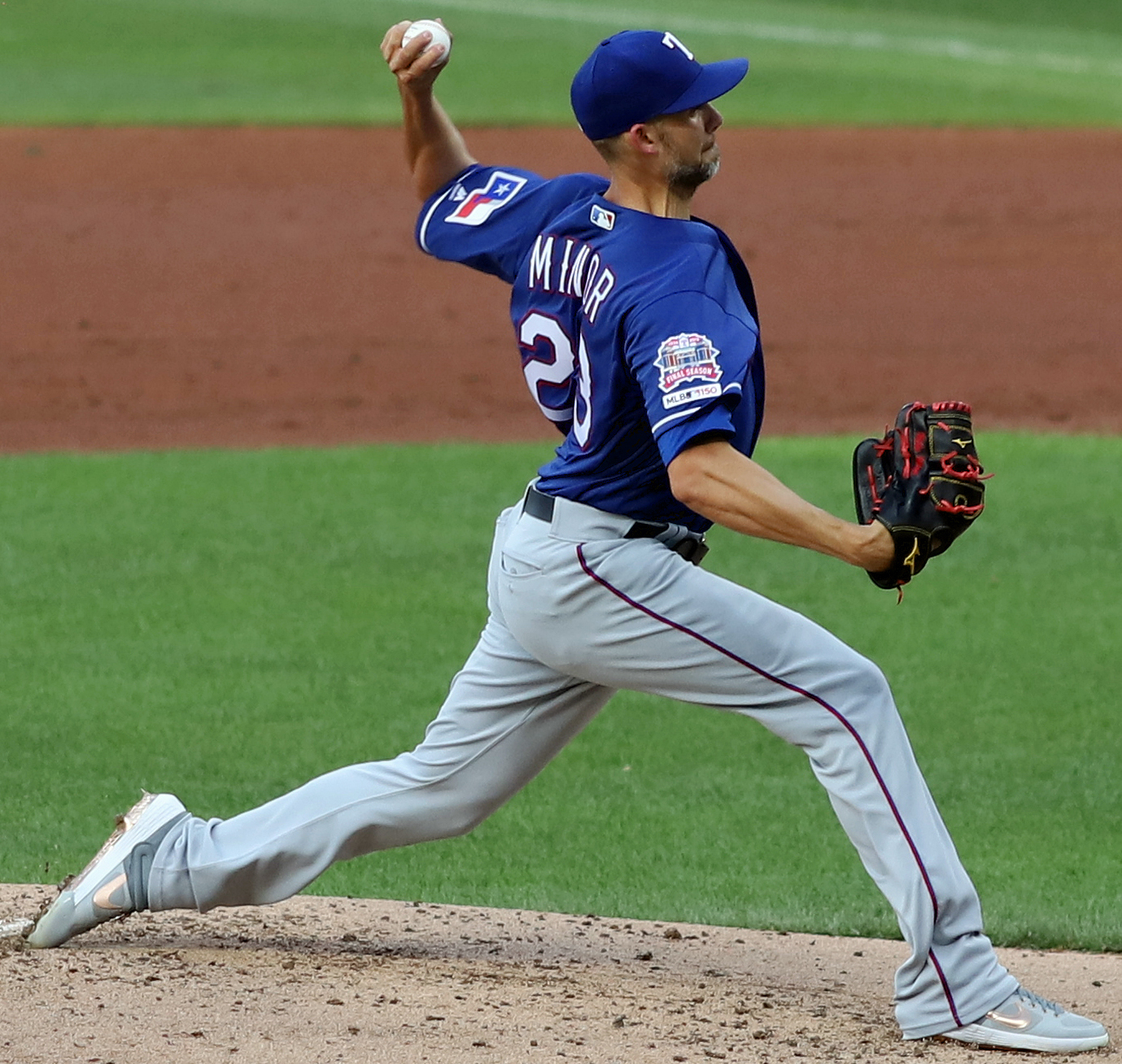
Minor pitching for the Rangers in 2019

Minor leads with a four-seam fastball at 89–93 mph, a pitch he throws more than half the time. In relatively equal amounts he throws a slider (83–86), a circle change (82–84), and a knuckle curve (77–80). Left-handed hitters rarely see the changeup, especially with two strikes. The curve has a whiff rate of 39% over Minor's career. He has produced one of the league's lowest ground ball/fly ball ratios since he debuted.
