= Marshall County High School (Kentucky) =

Coordinates: 36.9129°N 88.3328°W

Location
- 416 High School Rd; Benton, Kentucky 42025; United States

Information
- Type: Public High school
- Motto: Marshall Strong
- Established: 1974
- School district: Marshall County Schools
- Superintendent: William "Billy" Thorpe
- NCES School ID: 210381000976
- Principal: Shannon Solomon
- Grades: 9–12
- Enrollment: 1,216 (2023–2024)
- Color
- Fight song: Notre Dame Fight Song
- Athletics: Archery, Baseball, Basketball, Bass Fishing, Cheerleading, Cross-Country, Dance, Football, Golf, Soccer, Softball, Tennis, Track and Field, Volleyball
- Athletics conference: KHSAA Region One, District Four
- Mascot: Marshal Man
- Nickname: Marshals and Lady Marshals
- Website: mchs.marshall.kyschools.us/o/mchs

Marshall County High School is a secondary school in the Draffenville area of unincorporated Marshall County, Kentucky, United States, near Benton.

== History ==
Marshall County High School was incorporated in 1974 as a merger of North Marshall High School, Benton High School, and South Marshall High School which all became junior high schools (grades 7–9). The school first consisted of grades 10–12. The first Graduating class was May 1975. In 1988, 9th grade students were added to the high school enrollment. The county junior high schools (Benton, South Marshall and North Marshall) became middle schools and took on 6th grade from the elementary schools.

Marshall County High School also had a Vocational Education School for adults and students alike which opened a year earlier in 1973. It is now known as Marshall County Technology Center which houses its various vocational trades for the students.

=== 2018 shooting ===
On January 23, 2018, Marshall County High School became the site of the largest high school shooting in Kentucky. Sixteen people were shot, two of them were fatally wounded. Four others were injured as they tried to flee the school. It occurred just thirty-two miles away from Heath High School, where three girls were shot and killed in 1997.

== Marshall County Hoop Fest ==
Marshall County High School is the site of a national invitational preparatory basketball showcase called Marshall County Hoop Fest. The event, held annually in the 5,500 seat Reed Conder Gymnasium, hosts nationally ranked teams over the first weekend in December. Players like Carmelo Anthony, Kevin Durant, Derrick Rose, Carson Ives, and Josh Smith have all played in the event over the years.

== Notable alumni ==
- Dan Langhi (1996), professional basketball player
- Cody Forsythe (2008), professional baseball player
- Zion Harmon (2021), college basketball player
- Chrishell Stause (1999), actress
