= 2018 Marshall County High School shooting =

Mass shooting in Kentucky, U.S.

- Location of Marshall County High School (the United States) Location of Marshall County High School (Kentucky)
- Location: 36.912°N 88.332°W; Benton, Kentucky, U.S.
- Date: January 23, 2018; 7:57 AM (CST)
- Attack type: Mass shooting; school shooting; double-murder; attempted mass murder
- Weapon: .22-caliber Ruger MK II semi-automatic pistol
- Deaths: 2
- Injuries: 18 (14 by gunfire)
- Perpetrator: Gabriel Ross Parker
- Verdict: Pleaded guilty
- Convictions: Murder (2 counts); First-degree assault (8 counts); Second-degree assault (6 counts)
- Sentence: Two life sentences with the possibility of parole after 20 years, plus 70 years in prison

The 2018 Marshall County High School shooting was a mass shooting that occurred at Marshall County High School near Benton, Kentucky, (Note: The school's mailing address is in Benton, but it is physically located in Draffenville, an unincorporated community several miles north of the Benton city limits.) on January 23, 2018. The gunman, 15-year-old student Gabe Parker, opened fire in an open area of the school, murdering two students and injuring 14 others.

On June 12, 2020, Parker was given two life sentences with the possibility of parole after 20 years, plus 70 years.

== Shooting ==
At 7:57 AM, as students were gathering in the commons prior to the start of classes, 15-year-old student Gabriel Ross Parker opened fire with a Ruger handgun, murdering two other 15-year-olds at the scene.

Parker reportedly went to the school's band room to check with his friends before the shooting to make sure they were not in the area before returning to the commons area and beginning his attack. Witnesses stated that the gunman's eyes were "lifeless" and that he said nothing while he fired at students.

After the shooting, Parker discarded the weapon, ran to the weight room and hid with other students. Unaware he was the shooter, students motioned for him to join them in hiding. Another student who was hiding in the location recognized Parker as the shooter and alerted a teacher in the room about the shooter's identity. The teacher then called law enforcement.

A large number of students fled the school's campus to seek safety with local business owners attempting to aid the students. Students running from the incident heard screams of "Get down!", but many fled or attempted to evacuate the wounded from the school and drive them to the hospital. This created chaos, as many dropped what they were carrying and jumped fences or ran into the woods. Many students also ran to the school's technical building on campus.

Eighteen other people were injured by bullets and the chaos afterwards, with three people critically injured. Parker was taken into custody by the Marshall County Sheriff at 8:06 AM.

The mother of the shooter reportedly received a phone call from her son that there had been a shooting and that he was scared. The revelation that her son was the perpetrator of the shooting caused her to be physically ill.

== Victims ==
Bailey Nicole Holt and Preston Ryan Cope, both 15 years old, were killed. Holt died at the scene after reportedly calling her mother but "couldn't say anything". Cope was airlifted to and later died at the Vanderbilt University Medical Center due to a non-survivable gunshot wound to the head. Cope's parents reached the school before he died and bypassed first responders to be by his side.

Eighteen other students were injured, injuries sustained ranged from head wounds, to injuries to arms, the chest and abdomen from either the bullets or the chaos. Authorities reported that the wounded were five females and thirteen male students between the ages of 14 and 18 years old. Some of the victims were pulled from the scene, by students and faculty and transported to the hospital for medical treatment.

On January 27, one of the wounded was discharged from Vanderbilt Medical Center and one remained in stable condition.

== Perpetrator ==
Gabe Parker
- Born: Gabriel Ross Parker; March 3, 2002 (age 24); Kentucky, U.S.
- Status: Incarcerated

Details
- Imprisoned at: Northpoint Training Center, Danville, Kentucky

The perpetrator was a 15-year-old sophomore at the school. The Marshall County Sheriff from the Marshall County Sheriff's Department located the boy, identified as Gabriel Ross Parker, and arrested him after the shooting. After his arrest a bag that Parker had on his person was searched by police, and held a copy of the Communist Manifesto and a large Winchester sheath knife. At his home he had a copy of Mein Kampf. Officers also seized Parker's phone.

=== Investigation ===
Once arrested, Parker was Mirandized and interviewed for almost two hours before Parker requested a lawyer. In the interview Parker reportedly told the investigating officers he planned the night before to take his step-father's pistol and the pros and cons of carrying out the act. School surveillance video documented the incident, and shows the progression of the incident.

Police did not immediately offer a motive. According to the testimony of Marshall County Sheriff's Captain Matt Hilbrecht, during the interrogation, Parker expressed that "he was an atheist and that his life had no purpose and other people's lives also had no purpose." Officers also stated that Parker indicated the shooting was an "experiment" to see how students and society would respond.

=== Legal proceedings ===
Parker was arraigned in Marshall County Circuit Court on February 16, 2018. He has been charged with two counts of murder and fourteen counts of first-degree assault. The Kentucky Court of Appeals ordered the release of previously sealed records of Parker by the Marshall County Circuit Court after his 16th birthday as he is being tried as an adult. In March 2018, Parker and his attorney were in court to attempt to have the case moved back to juvenile court, which was denied; he was to be tried as an adult.

During a pre-trial hearing in August 2018, it was reported that there was evidence from over 100 cell phones which would be potentially used in the trial against Parker. At trial, it was stated that if the prosecutors of the case received an expert opinion that Parker was suffering from a mental defect or disease, potential charges of wanton endangerment would be levied against Parker's stepfather. In May 2019, the judge ruled that his trial would be moved to Christian County, citing heavy publicity and sensational allegations. The trial was scheduled for June 2020. Due to his age, Parker was not eligible for either the death penalty or life without parole, and according to Kentucky law must be eligible for parole after serving 25 years. In April 2020, Parker pled guilty to murder. Afterwards, Parker's mother apologized to Holt's and Cope's families for her son's actions. On June 12, he was sentenced to two life terms plus 70 years and will be eligible for parole after serving 20 years. During his sentencing, Holt's and Cope's families each delivered victim impact statements against Parker.

== Response ==
A benefit concert at the Kentucky Opry in Benton was organized to raise donations for the families of shooting victims, with another concert organized three weeks after the first. The town also employed blue and orange ribbons, and the phrase "Marshall Strong". In June 2018, students who had been wounded were given checks from donation campaigns. Federal grants were announced in August 2018 by Governor Matt Bevin to support victims during the shooter's trial, as well as for mental health professionals and a recovery plan coordinator to aid students on-site at the high school.

Some students have become involved with the March for Our Lives campaign and gun control rallies, causing them to be at odds with a majority of the area, which saw commentators in local news media claiming the students were too young to know anything. Survivors of shootings at Heath High School, Columbine High School, and Isla Vista reached out to survivors to encourage healing and discussion about the incident.

The entire student body was awarded the 911 Hero Award in September 2018, recognizing the students' actions during the shooting.

=== School response ===
Less than a week after the incident, the school implemented new safety methods to protect the students. Students that arrived late would have to check in with the front office, and staff members began to screen students with metal detector wands before allowing them to enter. The school has also instated a second officer on full-time at the location, with grant proposals for more school resource officers. In June 2018 it was reported that the Marshall County School District had banned students carrying backpacks at the high school and two middle schools to protect the students.

== See also ==
- 1997 Heath High School shooting, which occurred about 28 miles (45 km) away
- List of school shootings in the United States by death toll
