= Marcus Haislip =

American basketball player (born 1980)

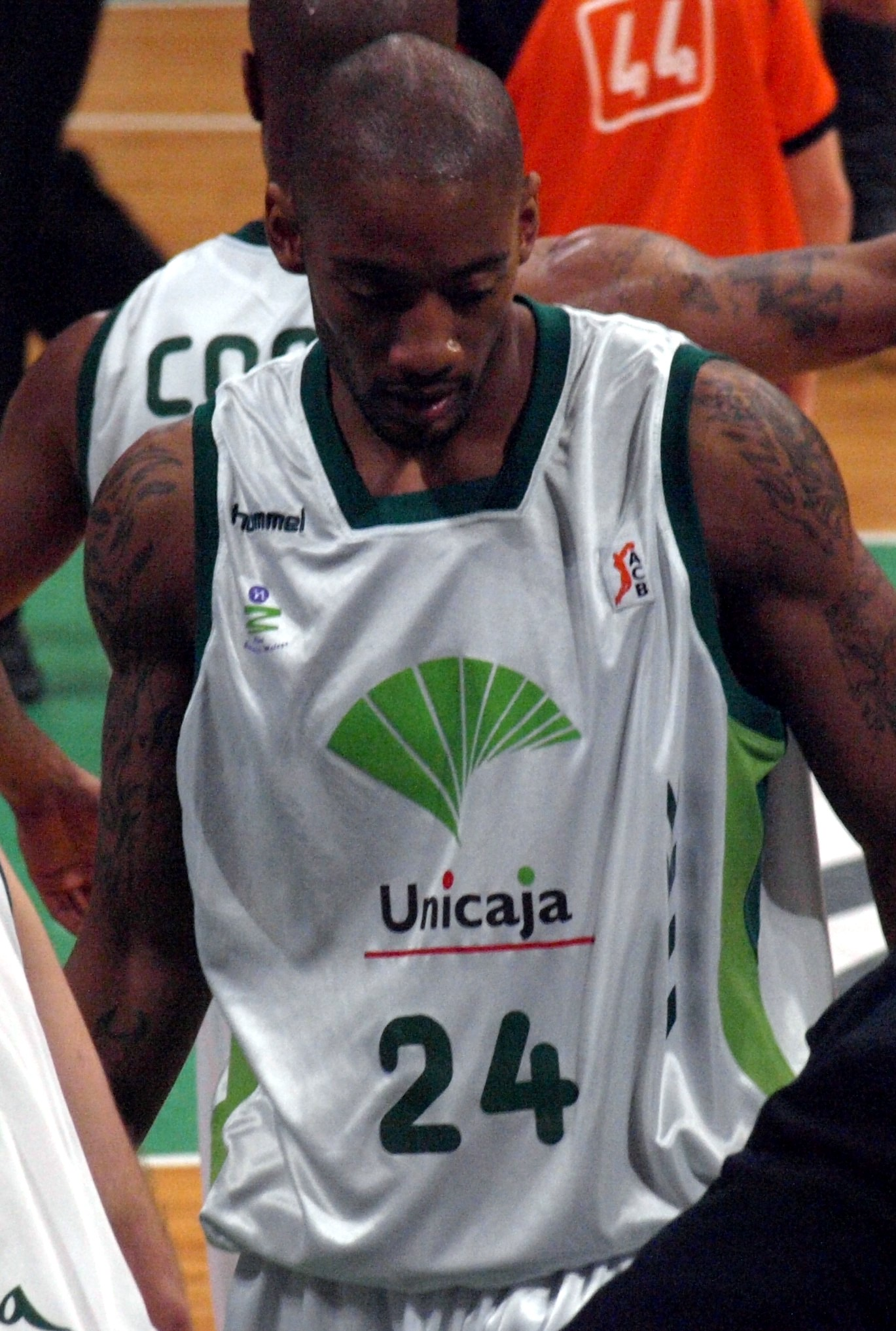
- Haislip with Unicaja Málaga in 2009

Personal information
- Born: December 22, 1980 (age 45) Lewisburg, Tennessee, U.S.
- Listed height: 6 ft 10 in (2.08 m)
- Listed weight: 230 lb (104 kg)

Career information
- High school: Marshall County (Lewisburg, Tennessee)
- College: Tennessee (1999–2002)
- NBA draft: 2002: 1st round, 13th overall pick
- Drafted by: Milwaukee Bucks
- Playing career: 2002–2017
- Position: Power forward
- Number: 12, 2, 22

Career history
- 2002–2004: Milwaukee Bucks
- 2004–2005: Indiana Pacers
- 2005–2006: Ülkerspor
- 2006–2007: Efes Pilsen
- 2007–2009: Unicaja Málaga
- 2009–2010: San Antonio Spurs
- 2010: Panathinaikos
- 2010–2011: Caja Laboral
- 2011: Guangdong Southern Tigers
- 2011–2012: Foshan Dralions
- 2012: Champville SC
- 2012–2013: Dongguan Leopards
- 2013–2014: Jiangsu Dragons
- 2014: Club Africain
- 2014–2015: Eskişehir Basket
- 2015–2016: Türk Telekom
- 2016: Guizhou White Tigers
- 2016–2017: Gaziantep Basketbol

Career highlights
- CBA All-Star (2013); Turkish Cup winner (2007); 2× Turkish League All-Star (2006–2007); Greek League All Star (2010); Spanish League Most Spectacular Player (2009); Second-team All-SEC (2002)
- Stats at NBA.com
- Stats at Basketball Reference

Marcus Deshon Haislip (born December 22, 1980) is an American former professional basketball player who played in the National Basketball Association (NBA) and other top leagues. Haislip attended Marshall County High School in Lewisburg, Tennessee. He rose to prominence while playing college basketball with the University of Tennessee from 1999 to 2002. After college, he played for several seasons in the NBA and the EuroLeague. He is listed at 6 ft 10 in (2.08 m) and 230 lbs. (104 kg).

== Professional career ==
Haislip was selected by the Milwaukee Bucks as the 13th pick of the 2002 NBA draft. During his rookie year Haislip was inserted into the starting line-up for the final nine games of the 2002–03 NBA season. When the playoffs started he was relegated to the bench. He remained a bench player with the Bucks for his first two seasons until being placed on waivers on November 4, 2004. He was signed by the Indiana Pacers during the 2004–05 season in order to fill the team's gap at power forward, due to the 15-game suspension of Jermaine O'Neal.

He started playing for Ülkerspor in the 2005–06 season. In March 2006, he left the team without authorization and returned to the United States due to "family issues", according to a teammate. He was selected to the BSL (Turkish Basketball Super League) All-Star Game and also participated in the Slam Dunk contest, which he won. He signed with Turkish Basketball League powerhouse Efes Pilsen in August 2006.

Haislip returned to the U.S. with Pilsen in October 2006, when the team played a pair of exhibition games against NBA teams. Pilsen played the Denver Nuggets in Denver on October 11, and played the Golden State Warriors in Oakland on October 13. Haislip scored 13 points and added 9 rebounds against the Warriors. On July 13, 2007, Haislip signed with the Spanish ACB club Unicaja Málaga.

Haislip was signed by the San Antonio Spurs of the NBA on July 8, 2009. He was waived by the Spurs on January 22, 2010, after appearing in ten games for them. That tenth game that Haislip played for the Spurs ended up being his final game in the NBA. His final game was played on January 16, 2010, in a 86 - 92 loss to the Memphis Grizzlies where he recorded 4 points and 3 rebounds.

On January 24, 2010, Haislip signed with the Greek Basket League powerhouse Panathinaikos. He was released on April 16, 2010.

In September 2010, he signed with the Spanish powerhouse Caja Laboral. In December 2010, Caja Laboral opened disciplinary proceedings against Haislip because he left the city without permission from the club. He was suspended without pay. The contract was terminated by mutual consent on January 5, 2011.

On January 13, 2011, he signed with the Guangdong Southern Tigers in China. In December 2011, he signed with the Foshan Dralions.

In March 2012, he signed a two-month contract with Champville SC, and became the highest paid foreigner in the history of the Lebanese Basketball League. Together with his teammate Fadi El Khatib, they won the Lebanese championship for their first time. Champville didn't renew his contract the following year.

In September 2012, he joined the Dongguan Leopards of the Chinese Basketball Association for the 2012–13 season. For the next season he stayed in China but moved to Jiangsu Dragons.

On November 24, 2014, Haislip signed a one-month deal with Club Africain of the Tunisian League. On December 24, 2014, he signed with Eskişehir Basket of Turkey for the rest of the season.

In December 2015, he signed with Türk Telekom for the rest of the 2015–16 season. In May 2016, he signed in China with the Guizhou White Tigers for the 2016 NBL season.

In August 2016, Haislip signed with Turkish club Gaziantep Basketbol.

== Career statistics ==
Legend
GP	Games played	GS	Games started	MPG	Minutes per game
FG%	Field-goal percentage	3P%	3-point field-goal percentage	FT%	Free-throw percentage
RPG	Rebounds per game	APG	Assists per game	SPG	Steals per game
BPG	Blocks per game	PPG	Points per game	PIR	Performance index rating
**Bold**	Career high

Led the league

=== EuroLeague ===
Year	Team	GP	GS	MPG	FG%	3P%	FT%	RPG	APG	SPG	BPG	PPG	PIR
2005–06	Ülkerspor	17	15	**28.3**	.456	**.412**	.590	6.3	**.6**	**.9**	1.6	11.9	13.6
2006–07	Efes Pilsen	**20**	**19**	27.8	.490	.376	.754	**6.7**	.4	.7	**1.8**	**14.1**	**16.1**
2007–08	Unicaja Málaga	15	15	25.3	.491	.359	.795	4.6	**.6**	.6	.8	13.7	12.2
2008–09	Unicaja Málaga	14	12	27.4	.391	.245	**.815**	4.9	.5	.6	.4	11.2	10.5
2009–10	Panathinaikos	6	2	17.5	.400	.125	.692	3.3	.0	.2	.0	5.7	4.2
2010–11	Caja Laboral	5	2	10.1	**.667**	.333	.000	1.2	.0	.4	.6	4.6	4.2
Career		77	65	25.4	.462	.332	.719	5.2	.4	.6	1.1	11.7	12.1

=== NBA ===
==== Regular season ====
Year	Team	GP	GS	MPG	FG%	3P%	FT%	RPG	APG	SPG	BPG	PPG
2002–03	Milwaukee	**39**	**8**	11.3	.431	.250	.684	1.4	.2	**.2**	**.5**	**4.1**
2003–04	Milwaukee	31	0	8.5	**.486**	.500	**.714**	**1.7**	.1	**.2**	.4	3.0
2004–05	Indiana	9	0	**11.7**	.342	.000	.545	**1.7**	**.3**	**.2**	.2	3.6
2009–10	San Antonio	10	0	4.4	.476	**.600**	.400	1.0	.0	.0	.2	2.5
Career		89	8	9.6	.437	.350	.659	1.5	.2	.2	.4	3.5

==== Playoffs ====
Year	Team	GP	GS	MPG	FG%	3P%	FT%	RPG	APG	SPG	BPG	PPG
2003	Milwaukee	**2**	**1**	**12.0**	.667	–	**.500**	**2.0**	**1.0**	**1.0**	**.5**	**5.0**
2004	Milwaukee	1	0	3.0	**1.000**	–	–	1.0	.0	.0	.0	2.0
Career		3	1	9.0	.714	–	.500	1.7	.7	.7	.3	4.0
