= Benton, Kentucky =

- City
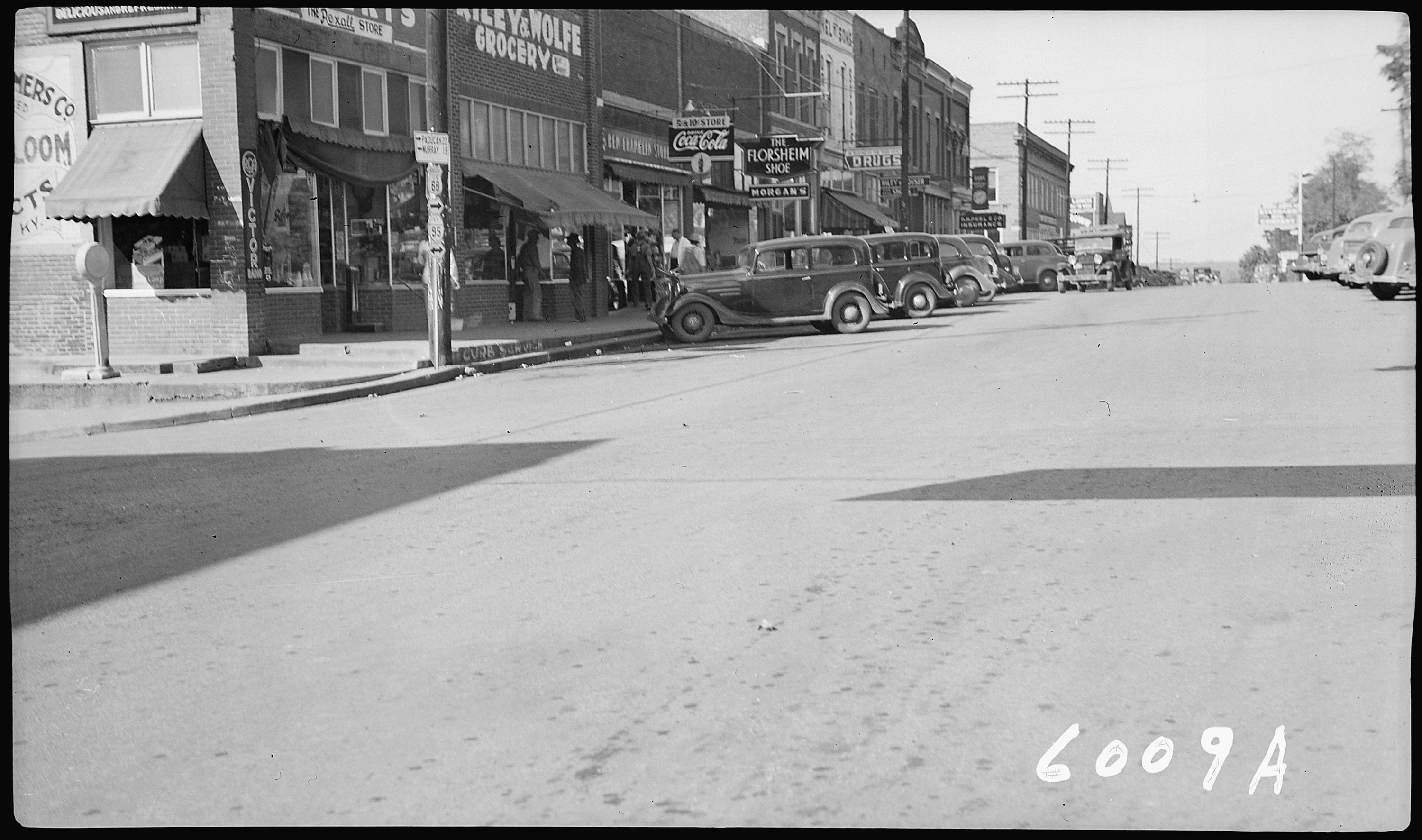
- Benton in 1939

- Location of Benton in Marshall County, Kentucky.
- Coordinates: 36°51′19″N 88°21′15″W
- Country: United States
- State: Kentucky
- County: Marshall

Area
  - Total: 5.10 sq mi (13.20 km^{2})
  - Land: 5.04 sq mi (13.05 km^{2})
  - Water: 0.058 sq mi (0.15 km^{2})
- Elevation: 423 ft (129 m)

Population (2020)
  - Total: 4,756
  - Estimate (2024): 4,726
  - Density: 944.1/sq mi (364.52/km^{2})
- Time zone: UTC-6 (Central (CST))
  - Summer (DST): UTC-5 (CDT)
- ZIP code: 42025
- Area codes: 270 & 364
- FIPS code: 21-05824
- GNIS feature ID: 2403856
- Website: https://benton.ky.gov/

Benton is a home rule-class city and the county seat of Marshall County, Kentucky, United States. The current mayor of this city is Rita Dotson. The population was 4,756 at the 2020 census.

== History ==
Benton was founded in 1842 by John Bearden and Francis H. Clayton. The town was named for Thomas Hart Benton, a senator from Missouri. Benton was then incorporated in 1845.

In 1908, Benton drove its African American residents out of town, becoming a sundown town along with the rest of Marshall County.

On January 23, 2018, a mass shooting occurred at Marshall County High School, near Benton, resulting in 19 injuries and 2 fatalities.

On December 10, 2021, the town was hit by the 2021 Western Kentucky Tornado.

== Geography ==
According to the United States Census Bureau, the city has a total area of 3.9 square miles (10 km^{2}), all land. Benton lies in the center of the county encompassing the hills just south and west of Clarks River. Benton is the county seat of Marshall county, in the far western region of west Kentucky known as the Jackson purchase.

== Demographics ==
Historical population
Census	Pop.	Note	%±
1860	165		—
1880	277		—
1890	344		24.2%
1900	664		93.0%
1910	824		24.1%
1920	897		8.9%
1930	1,021		13.8%
1940	1,906		86.7%
1950	1,980		3.9%
1960	3,074		55.3%
1970	3,652		18.8%
1980	3,700		1.3%
1990	3,899		5.4%
2000	4,197		7.6%
2010	4,349		3.6%
2020	4,756		9.4%
2024 (est.)	4,726		−0.6%
U.S. Decennial Census

=== 2020 census ===
As of the 2020 census, Benton had a population of 4,756. The median age was 40.4 years. 22.3% of residents were under the age of 18 and 21.3% of residents were 65 years of age or older. For every 100 females there were 90.2 males, and for every 100 females age 18 and over there were 87.2 males age 18 and over.

96.6% of residents lived in urban areas, while 3.4% lived in rural areas.

There were 1,947 households in Benton, of which 29.4% had children under the age of 18 living in them. Of all households, 43.7% were married-couple households, 15.0% were households with a male householder and no spouse or partner present, and 35.2% were households with a female householder and no spouse or partner present. About 34.1% of all households were made up of individuals and 18.9% had someone living alone who was 65 years of age or older.

There were 2,160 housing units, of which 9.9% were vacant. The homeowner vacancy rate was 2.9% and the rental vacancy rate was 8.1%.

Racial composition as of the 2020 census
Race	Number	Percent
White	4,441	93.4%
Black or African American	41	0.9%
American Indian and Alaska Native	8	0.2%
Asian	51	1.1%
Native Hawaiian and Other Pacific Islander	2	0.0%
Some other race	16	0.3%
Two or more races	197	4.1%
Hispanic or Latino (of any race)	104	2.2%

=== 2010 census ===
As of the 2010 Census, there were 4,349 people, 1,809 households, and 1,154 families residing in the city. The population density was 1,007.4 inhabitants per square mile (389.0/km^{2}). There were 2,032 housing units at an average density of 470.7 per square mile (181.7/km^{2}). The racial makeup of the city was 97.4% White (96.4% non-Hispanic), 0.4% African American, 0.1% Native American and Alaska Native, 0.6% Asian, 0.6% from other races, and 0.9% from two or more races. Hispanics or Latinos of any race were 1.8% of the population.

There were 1,809 households, out of which 27.2% had children under the age of 18 living with them, 48.5% were married couples living together, 11.4% had a female householder with no husband present, 3.9% had a male householder with no wife present, and 36.2% were non-families. 33.2% of all households were made up of individuals, and 17.1% had someone living alone who was 65 years of age or older. The average household size was 2.26 and the average family size was 2.84.

The age distribution was 21.5% under 18, 7.7% from 18 to 24, 26.1% from 25 to 44, 23.4% from 45 to 64, and 21.4% who were 65 or older. The median age was 40.5 years. For every 100 females, there were 89.7 males. For every 100 females age 18 and over, there were 86.7 males.

=== Income and poverty ===
Based on 2008–2012 estimates from the American Community Survey, the median income for a household in the city was $42,342, and the median income for a family was $62,500. Among full-time workers, males had a median income of $47,895 versus $29,272 for females. The per capita income for the city was $21,959. About 4.5% of families and 8.4% of the population were below the poverty line, including 5.3% of those under age 18 and 10.7% of those age 65 or over.

== Culture ==
Shape note singers gather annually at Benton on the fourth Sunday in May to sing from a tunebook called The Southern Harmony. This event, organized in 1884 and called The Big Singing or Big Singing Day, is the oldest continuous Southern Harmony singing in the United States.

=== Tater Day ===
Tater Day was started in 1843 as a celebration of spring, and a time when all of the townsfolk would get together and trade in sweet potato slips, used to grow the plants. It is also the oldest continuous trade day in the United States, in which goods such as guns, 'coon hounds, tobacco, or livestock are swapped or sold. Tater Day brings to town carnival rides, games, a market, a potato eating contest, mule pulls, and a "biggest potato" contest, which attracts large potatoes from across the county. The biggest part of the festival is the parade, which completes one circuit around the town. It includes political floats, Marshall County High School marching band, horses and buggies, clowns, vintage cars, horses, Miss Tater Day, and other things for which Marshall County is known. There is also Junior Miss Tater Day for little girls ages 5 to 12, and Little Mister, Tiny Miss, and Baby Miss Tater day pageants and floats for the younger kids. There is also an annual Tater day derby that is hosted at the dirt track at the Benton City Park.

== Education ==
Benton is part of the Marshall County Schools. There are 11 schools in the district, not including the technical school that is incorporated with Marshall County High School, the district's only secondary educational institution. For the 2011 to 2012 school year, there were approximately 4,838 students enrolled in the district.

Benton has a lending library, a branch of the Marshall County Public Library.

== See also ==
- List of sundown towns in the United States
