= Friedrichsburg =

Friedrichsburg (German for "Frederick's castle") may refer to:

- Fort Friedrichsburg in Königsberg, Prussia
- Groß Friedrichsburg, colonial fort in Ghana
- Friedrichsburg, a castle which preceded Mannheim Palace
- a part of Hessisch Oldendorf, Hesse
- a former palace in Lampertheim, Hesse

== See also ==
- Fredericksburg (disambiguation)
- Frederiksborg (disambiguation)
