= USS Santee (CVE-29) =

Escort carriers of the United States Navy

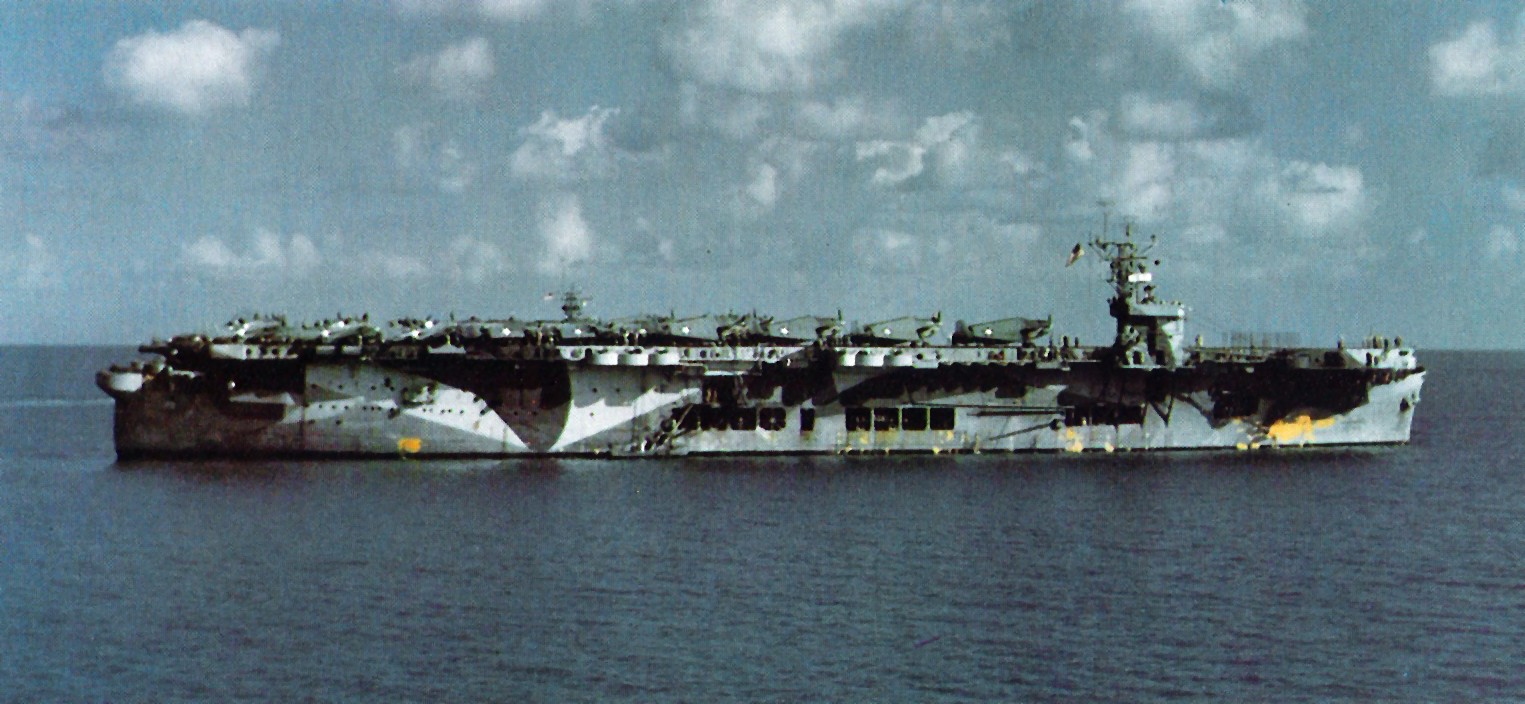
- USS Santee, mid-October 1942, painted in Camouflage Measure 17

History

United States
- Name: Seakay
- Owner: Keystone Tankship Corp.
- Ordered: as type (T2-S2-A1) hull, MCE hull 3
- Awarded: 3 January 1938
- Builder: Sun Shipbuilding and Dry Dock Company, Chester, Pennsylvania
- Cost: $880,516.70
- Yard number: 173
- Way number: 1
- Laid down: 31 May 1938
- Launched: 4 March 1939
- Sponsored by: Mrs. Charles Kurz
- In service: 29 March 1939
- Out of service: 18 October 1940
- Fate: Sold to US Navy, 18 October 1940

United States
- Name: Santee
- Namesake: Santee River, in South Carolina
- Acquired: 18 October 1940
- Commissioned: 30 October 1940
- Decommissioned: Spring 1942
- Identification: Hull symbol: AO-29; Callsign: NIMS
- Recommissioned: 24 August 1942
- Decommissioned: 21 October 1946
- Refit: Norfolk Navy Yard, Norfolk, Virginia
- Stricken: 1 March 1959
- Identification: Hull symbol: AVG-29 (14 February 1942); ACV-29 (20 August 1942); CVE-29 (15 July 1943); CVHE-29 (12 June 1955); Callsign: NWTQ
- Fate: Sold, 5 December 1959, scrapped in Bremerhaven, West Germany, in 1960

General characteristics as fleet oiler
- Class & type: Cimarron-class oiler
- Displacement: 7,470 long tons (7,590 t) light; 25,425 long tons (25,833 t) full load
- Length: 525 ft (160 m) wl
- Beam: 75 feet (23 m)
- Draft: 32 ft 3 in (9.83 m)
- Installed power: 4 × Babcock & Wilcox steam boilers (450 psi (3,100 kPa)); 13,500 shp (10,100 kW)
- Propulsion: 2 × Westinghouse geared steam turbines; 2 × shafts
- Speed: 18.3 kn (33.9 km/h; 21.1 mph)
- Capacity: 122,400 bbl (19,460 m^{3}) of oil; 805,000 US gal (3,050,000 L; 670,000 imp gal) of gasoline
- Complement: 301 officers and men
- Armament: 4 × single 5 in (130 mm)/51 cal guns]; 4 × twin Bofors 40 mm (1.6 in) anti-aircraft guns; 4 × twin Oerlikon 20 mm (0.79 in) anti-aircraft cannons

General characteristics as escort carrier
- Class & type: Sangamon-class escort carrier
- Displacement: 11,400 long tons (11,583 t) standard; 24,275 long tons (24,665 t) full
- Length: 553 ft 6 in (168.71 m) oa; 503 ft (153 m) flight deck
- Beam: 75 ft (23 m); 105 ft (32 m) flight deck
- Draft: 30 ft 7 in (9.32 m)
- Range: 23,920 nmi (44,300 km; 27,530 mi) at 15 kn (28 km/h; 17 mph)
- Complement: 830 officers and men
- Armament: 2 × 5"/51 caliber guns; 4 × twin Bofors 40 mm L/60 anti-aircraft guns; 12 × single Oerlikon 20 mm cannons
- Aircraft carried: 25
- Aviation facilities: 1 × hydraulic catapult; 2 × elevators

General characteristics 1945
- Complement: 1,080 officers and men
- Armament: 2 × quad Bofors 40 mm L/60 anti-aircraft guns; 10 × twin Bofors 40 mm L/60 anti-aircraft guns; 19 × single Oerlikon 20 mm cannons
- Aircraft carried: 32
- Aviation facilities: 2 × hydraulic catapults

Service record
- Commanders: William Sample (1942–44)
- Operations: World War II
- Awards: 9 battle stars

USS Santee (AVG/ACV/CVE/CVHE-29), was a US Navy escort carrier of World War II. Originally built as Seakay, one of twelve tankers built to a joint Navy-Maritime Commission design, this design was later duplicated and designated a T3-S2-A1 oiler. She was acquired by the Navy in 1940, and renamed Santee (AO-29), a Cimarron-class fleet oiler. In 1942, she was converted to a Sangamon-class escort carrier. Originally classified as an "Aircraft Escort Vessel", AVG-29, on 9 January 1942, she was reclassified an "Auxiliary Aircraft Carrier", ACV-29, 20 August 1942, before finally being classified as an "Escort Carrier", CVE-29, 15 July 1943. After the war, she was later classified an "Escort Helicopter Aircraft Carrier" and again redesignated, CVHE-29, 12 June 1955. She was named after the Santee River, in South Carolina.

== Construction ==
Seakay was laid down on 31 May 1938, by the Sun Shipbuilding and Dry Dock Company, in Cheaster, Pennsylvania, MC hull 3. She was launched on 4 March 1939; she was sponsored by Mrs. Charles Kurz, the wife of the founder of Keystone Shipping Company and head of the War Shipping Administration (WSA) during WWII.

== Civilian service ==
Seakay was delivered on 29 March 1939, to Keystone Tankship Corp., for service on the West coast. During her commercial service she set several records for fast oil hauling.

== Service history ==
On 18 October 1940, the US Navy acquired Seakay and renamed her Santee (AO-29), the ship was commissioned on 30 October 1940, as a Cimarron-class fleet oiler.

=== Fleet oiler service ===
After commissioning, Santee served in the Atlantic. When American neutrality ended on 7 December 1941, Santee was carrying oil for a secret airdrome at Argentia, in Newfoundland.

=== Conversion to escort carrier ===
On 9 January 1942, Santee was reclassified and designated for conversion to an "Aircraft Escort Vessel" (AVG), she was decommissioned around this time. In the spring of 1942, Santee's conversion to an aircraft carrier was begun at the Norfolk Navy Yard, in Norfolk, Virginia. On 20 August 1942, she was redesignated as an "Auxiliary Aircraft Carrier" (ACV). She was recommissioned on 24 August 1942, as Santee (ACV-29).

Santee was fitted with such haste that workmen from Norfolk were still on board during her shakedown training and her decks were piled high with stores. After conversion nominally completed on 8 September, Santee reported to Task Force 22 and the first plane landed on her flightdeck on 24 September.

=== Escort carrier service ===
==== 1942 ====
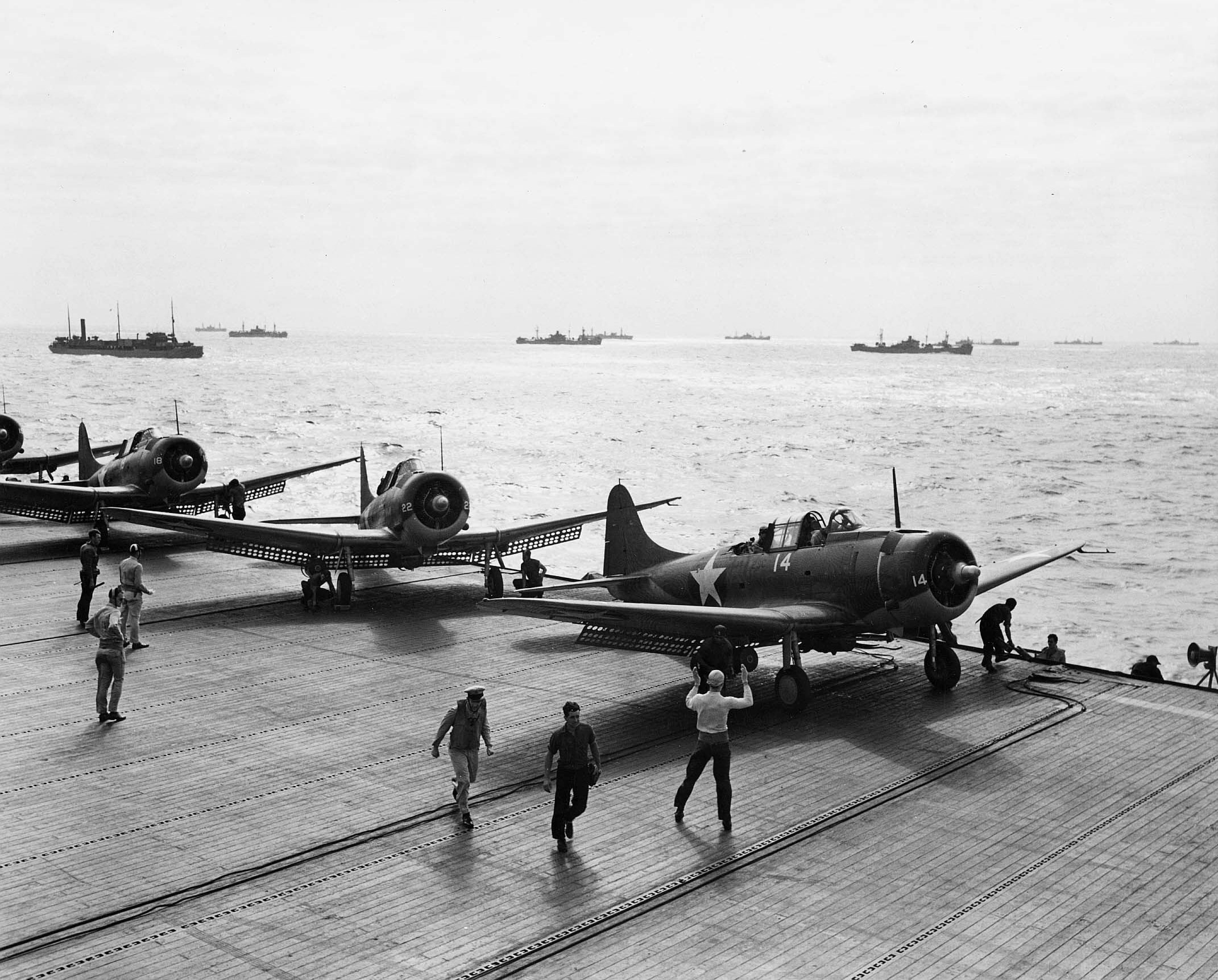
SBD bombers on Santee during convoy duty in the Atlantic

After shakedown, Santee departed Bermuda, on 25 October, and headed for the coast of Africa. While the escort carrier was en route, on 30 October, an SBD Dauntless being launched from a catapult dropped a 325 lb (147 kg) depth charge onto the flight deck. It rolled off the deck and detonated close to the port bow, shaking the entire ship and carrying away the rangefinder and a searchlight base, and damaging radar antennas.

Santee continued steaming with Task Group 34.2 (TG 34.2). On 7 November, she, along with destroyers Rodman and Emmons and the coastal minelayer Monadnock, left the formation and took positions off Safi, French Morocco, the following morning. Santee launched planes and fueled ships until 13 November, when she rejoined TG 34.2 and returned to Bermuda. The group departed on 22 November, and anchored in Hampton Roads, two days later.

==== 1943 ====
After voyage repairs and drydock, Santee got underway with the destroyer Eberle, on 26 December. On 1 January 1943, Santee anchored at Port of Spain, Trinidad. Two days later, with Eberle and Livermore, she headed for the coast of Brazil. She disembarking passengers at Recife, and sailed to join Task Unit 23.1.6 (TU 23.1.6), at sea, in tightening the noose on enemy merchant shipping and naval activity in the South Atlantic.

For a month, her planes flew anti-submarine (ASW) missions and regular patrols. On 15 February, Santee put in at Recife, remaining until 21 February. Back to conducting routine sorties in the same manner, Santee operated from 21 February to 2 March, when she again put into Recife.

Her next period at sea, which began on 4 March, brought action. On 10 March, the light cruiser Savannah and Eberle, were investigating a cargo liner, which had been spotted by Santee's aircraft. The ship had been tentatively identified as Karin, a Dutch merchantman. It turned out to be the German blockade runner Kota Nopan (ex-Dutch Kota Pinang). As Eberle's boarding party drew alongside, explosives placed by the abandoning crew detonated, killing eight boarders. On 15 March, Santee set out for Norfolk, and anchored at Hampton Roads on 28 March.

Underway again on 13 June, with the destroyers Bainbridge, Overton, and MacLeish, Santee reached Casablanca, on 3 July. Four days later, the escort carrier departed the harbor with a convoy of homeward-bound empties. No submarines were sighted, but one of her TBF Avengers made a forced landing in Spain, and its crew was interned. Santee's small task group left the convoy on 12 July, with orders to operate independently against U-boat concentrations south of the Azores. She remained at this anti-submarine work until 25 July, and managed to attack seven surfaced submarines, at the price of two Dauntless dive bombers.

On 25 July, she joined a west-bound convoy, which reached the Virginia, coast on 6 August. On 26 August, Santee, with Bainbridge and Greer, again headed into the Atlantic; and two days steaming brought them to Bermuda.

Santee made another convoy run from Bermuda to Casablanca, and back to Hampton Roads, from 29 August – 13 October. On 25 October, the escort carrier departed the East coast for Casablanca, reaching Basin Delpit, on 13 November. Standing out of Casablanca, the next day, she rendezvoused on 17 November, with the battleship Iowa, carrying President Franklin D. Roosevelt. After providing air cover for Iowa and her escorts for several days, Santee was ordered to the Bay of Biscay, where she engaged in anti-submarine work until the end of November.

As TG 21.11, Santee and a trio of WWI era "four-stackers", either Clemson or Wickes-class destroyers, patrolled the North Atlantic from 1–9 December. The group was dissolved upon arrival at the Norfolk Navy Yard, on 10 December. Santee, minus her aircraft, stood out of Norfolk, on 21 December, and headed for New York, in company with the battleship Texas, and several destroyers. From 22 to 28 December, the escort carrier packed her hangar and flight decks with P-38 Lightning fighter planes at Staten Island. Getting underway in convoy on 29 December, she steamed unchallenged across the North Atlantic, reaching Glasgow, on 9 January 1944.

==== 1944 ====
Santee emptied of her P-38 cargo and departed Glasgow, in convoy, on 13 January, and returned to Norfolk, on 24 January. She stood out of Norfolk, on 13 February, with destroyer escort Tatum, transited the Panama Canal, on 18–19 February, and moored at San Diego, California, on 28 February. There, she embarked 300 Navy and Marine Corps personnel and 31 aircraft for delivery to Pearl Harbor. She also took on 24 Grumman F4F Wildcats and Grumman TBF Avengers, as her own air group. Standing out of San Diego Bay, on 2 March, Santee unloaded her ferried aircraft and personnel at Pearl Harbor, upon her arrival on 9 March.

Santee, along with her sister ships Sangamon, Suwannee, Chenango, all former oilers, sailed out of Pearl Harbor, with an escort of destroyers, on 15 March, heading southwest. Designated Carrier Division 22 (CarDiv 22), they joined the fast carriers of the United States Fifth Fleet, on 27 March, and sped west to the Palaus. There, their planes of CarDiv 22 flew patrols over vulnerable tankers before setting course for Espiritu Santo, in the New Hebrides, on 4 April.

In this, the closing phase of the New Guinea campaign, Santee fueled and provisioned near Espiritu Santo, from 7–10 April; then sailed to Purvis Bay, in the Solomons, on 13 April. CarDiv 22 joined CarDiv 24, and a destroyer squadron, on 16 April, and set course for New Guinea.

Santee's air group aircraft aided in destroying 100 enemy aircraft and ripping up enemy airfields before the landings, prior to departing for Manus Island, Admiralties, on 24 April. Arriving at Seeadler Harbor the next day, she and her sister ships took on fuel and food; then sailed again on 26 April, for Hollandia (currently known as Jayapura). From 12 May – 1 June, she traded in her own air arm for 66 F4U Corsairs and 15 F6F Hellcats, and personnel of Marine Air Group 21 (MAG 21). On 2 June, CarDiv 22 started north for Kwajalein Atoll, in the Marshalls. On 4 August, Santee reached newly won Guam. The 81 aircraft of MAG 21 became the first planes to operate from the reconquered island.

After training exercises and the re-embarkment of her own planes at Manus, Santee got underway on 10 September, and rendezvoused with TF 77, near Mapia Island. At Morotai, in the Moluccas, her Avengers bombed ground installations. One plane was lost to the enemy, but Santee herself had no contact with the Japanese. By 1 October, she was back in Seeadler Harbor.

Sailing from Manus, on 12 October, Santee and accompanying combatants reached Philippine waters, on 20 October. Her gunners shot down an enemy plane during an air attack that morning, and her aircraft shot down two more.

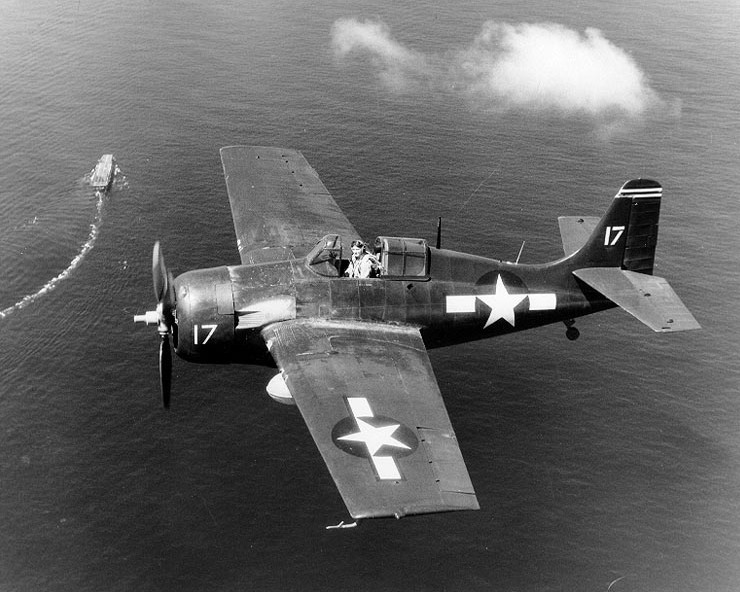
An FM-2 Wildcat flying over Santee in October 1944

At 07:36 on 25 October, Santee launched five Avengers and eight Wildcats, for an attack against Japanese surface units some 120 nmi (220 km; 140 mi) to the north. At 07:40, a kamikaze, carrying what was estimated to be a 63 kg (139 lb) bomb, crashed through the flight deck and damaged the hangar deck. At 07:56, a torpedo fired from a Japanese submarine struck the ship, causing flooding of several compartments and creating a 6° list. Emergency repairs were completed by 09:35.

Between 18 and 27 October, Santee planes shot down 31 Japanese planes, and sank one 5,000 long tons (5,100 t) ammunition ship, in addition to damage inflicted by strafing during their 377 sorties. On 31 October, she anchored in Seeadler Harbor, for temporary repairs.

Underway again on 9 November, she moored at Pearl Harbor, on 19 November. Following more repairs, she embarked 98 Marines for transportation to the US, and entered Los Angeles Harbor, on 5 December. Santee completed the year undergoing repairs to battle damage and general overhaul.

==== 1945 ====
After post repair trials at San Diego, the escort carrier headed toward Hawaii, on 31 January 1945, and arrived at Pearl Harbor, on 8 February. On 7 March, she got underway for Ulithi, in the Western Carolines, altering her course en route to assist in the search for the B-24 Liberator which had disappeared while carrying Army Lieutenant General Millard F. Harmon, before anchoring on 19 March. Two days later Santee steamed toward Leyte Gulf.

On 27 March, Santee departed the Philippines to provide air coverage for southern transport groups "Dog" and "Easy" en route to the objective area at Okinawa Gunto, for the invasion of Okinawa Jima, the largest combined operation of the Pacific war.

On Easter Sunday, 1 April 1945, Santee provided direct support to the American ground forces landing on Okinawa, and she continued this duty until 8 April, when she turned to aid British carriers, in denying the use of Sakishima Gunto airfields to the enemy. For 42 consecutive days, Santee's aircraft winged over target sectors in the East China Sea, with daily returns to Okinawa itself for routine ground support. On 16 June, Santee launched a fighter bomber mission against specified targets on Kyūshū, Japan.

Pulling out of the Okinawa area, on 16 June, Santee reached Leyte Gulf, on 19 June, where minor repairs were made. Out again on 1 July, she operated west of Okinawa, from 5–14 July, covering minesweeping operations. On 7 July, a tail hook broke on a landing aircraft, allowing it to clear all barriers, crash among parked planes, and cause a fire. Four fighters, and two torpedo bombers, were jettisoned, six torpedo bombers were rendered non-flyable duds, and one of the pilots of the parked aircraft was killed.

Santee was detached from the task unit on 15 July, and proceeded to Guam, arriving at Apra Harbor, four days later. Following flight deck repairs and general upkeep, the escort carrier got underway on 5 August, for Saipan, engaging in carrier aircraft training for squadrons flown from that island en route. Anchoring in Saipan Harbor, on 9 August, Santee got underway for the Philippines, on 13 August. Santee received word of the cessation of the hostilities against Japan, on 15 August, and anchored in San Pedro Bay, Leyte, two days later.

On 4 September, while en route to Korea, to support occupation forces there, Santee was ordered to northern Formosa, to evacuate ex-prisoners of war. On 5 September, the escort carrier received 155 officers and men of the British and Indian Armies from destroyer escort Kretchmer. These soldiers had been captured by the Japanese in Malaya, in 1942. They were given medical aid and berthed on the hangar deck. The next day, Santee picked up additional men from Finch and Brister, making a total of 322 officers and men. They included 30 US Army and Navy officers and men who had been taken on Bataan and Corregidor, and 10 officers and men from the Dutch Army and Merchant Marine, captured in Java. On 9 September, Santee disembarked the 477 evacuees at Manila Bay.

Five days later, Santee stood out of Manila Bay, and steamed for Okinawa, anchoring at Buckner Bay, on 19 September. Underway again the next day, Santee reached Wakanoura Wan, Honshū, Japan, on 22 September. From 24 to 26 September, Santee steamed along the coast, providing air coverage for occupation forces landing at Wakayama.

== Post-war ==
Santee departed Wakanoura Wan, on 3 October, leaving her formation on 6 October, to search for a missing PBM Mariner flying boat carrying Rear Admiral William D. Sample, the ship's first commanding officer after her conversion to an escort carrier.

On 20 October, Santee got underway for Okinawa, arriving two days later at Buckner Bay. On 23 October, Santee got underway for Pearl Harbor, disembarking 375 passengers there on 4 November. The next day, Santee continued her role in "Operation Magic Carpet" by embarking 18 Marines bound for the west coast.

Anchoring at San Diego, on 11 November, Santee remained there until 26 November, when she got underway for Guam, on additional "Magic Carpet" duty.

== Fate ==
On 27 February 1946, Santee departed San Diego, and arrived at Boston Harbor, on 25 March, via the Panama Canal. She was placed in reserve on 21 October 1946. Santee was reclassified on 12 June 1955, as an "Escort Helicopter Aircraft Carrier", CVHE-29. She was struck from the Naval Vessel Register on 1 March 1959. On 5 December, she was sold to the Master Metals Company for scrapping.

== Awards ==
Santee received nine battle stars and the Presidential Unit Citation for her World War II service.

== Bibliography ==
- "Santee II (CVE-29)". 2 September 2015. This article incorporates text from this source, which is in the public domain.
- Colton, Tim (28 March 2014). "SUN SHIPBUILDING Chester PA".
- Yarnall, Paul (18 June 2025). "USS SANTEE (ACV-29)". NavSource.
