= Fredericksburg =

Fredericksburg may refer to:

== Places ==
=== United States ===
- Fredericksburg, California
- Fredericksburg, Indiana
- Fredericksburg, Iowa
- Fredericksburg, Missouri
- Fredericksburg, Ohio, a village in Wayne County
- Fredericksburg, Mahoning County, Ohio, an unincorporated community
- Fredericksburg, Pennsylvania (disambiguation), various places
- Fredericksburg, Texas
- Fredericksburg, Virginia, a historic city in northern Virginia and the most-populous place with this name
  - Battle of Fredericksburg, a major battle of the American Civil War which took place there
  - Second Battle of Fredericksburg, another battle of the American Civil War that took place there

=== Canada ===
- Fredericksburg, Ontario, the former name for Delhi, Ontario

== Ships ==
- SS Fredericksburg, several ships
- CSS Fredericksburg, an ironclad of the Confederate States Navy during the American Civil War

== See also ==
- Frederiksberg, Denmark
