= Fredriksberg (disambiguation) =

Frederiksberg is a borough in Copenhagen, Denmark.

Fredriksberg or Frederiksberg could also refer to several places:

- Frederiksberg, Sorø, Denmark, see Sorø Municipality#Locations
- Frederiksberg Municipality, a municipality in Copenhagen, Denmark
- Fredriksberg, Sweden, a town in Dalarna County, Sweden
- The old Swedish name for Pasila, a district in the Finnish capital Helsinki

== See also ==
- Fredericksburg (disambiguation), the name of several populated places in North America
