= MV Cape Kennedy =

US military roll-on/roll-off ship

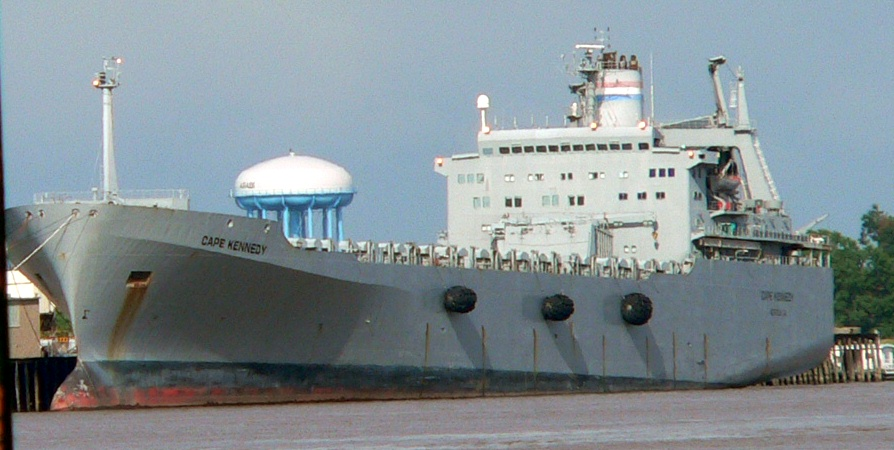
- MV Cape Kennedy moored at New Orleans 2007

History

United States
- Name: MV Cape Kennedy (T-AKR-5083)
- Namesake: Cape Kennedy
- Owner: United States Maritime Administration
- Operator: Keystone Shipping Company
- Laid down: 24 June 1978
- Launched: 17 October 1978 as MV Nedlloyd Rosario
- Renamed: MV Rosario Date unknown, MV Cape Kennedy
- Home port: New Orleans, LA
- Identification: IMO number: 7714636; MMSI number: 367802000; Callsign: KAOQ
- Status: National Defense Reserve Fleet

General characteristics
- Displacement: 15,718 tons light; 44,466 tons full
- Length: 696 ft (212 m)
- Beam: 106 ft (32 m)
- Draft: 35 ft (11 m)
- Propulsion: Single diesel, single screw
- Speed: 16.6 knots
- Complement: 25
- Time to activate: 5 Days

MV Cape Kennedy (T-AKR 5083) is one of the United States Military Sealift Command's 27 Roll-on/Roll-off Ships and one of the 44 Ready Reserve Force (RRF) ships in the Sealift Program Office. She is the sister ship of MV Cape Knox
