= SS Fredericksburg =

A number of steamships have been named Fredericksburg, including:

- SS Fredericksburg (1943) a T2 tanker
- SS Fredericksburg (1958) a T5 tanker

== See also ==
- CSS Fredericksburg, an ironclad of the Confederate States Navy
