= MV Sea Isle City =

1981 oil tanker

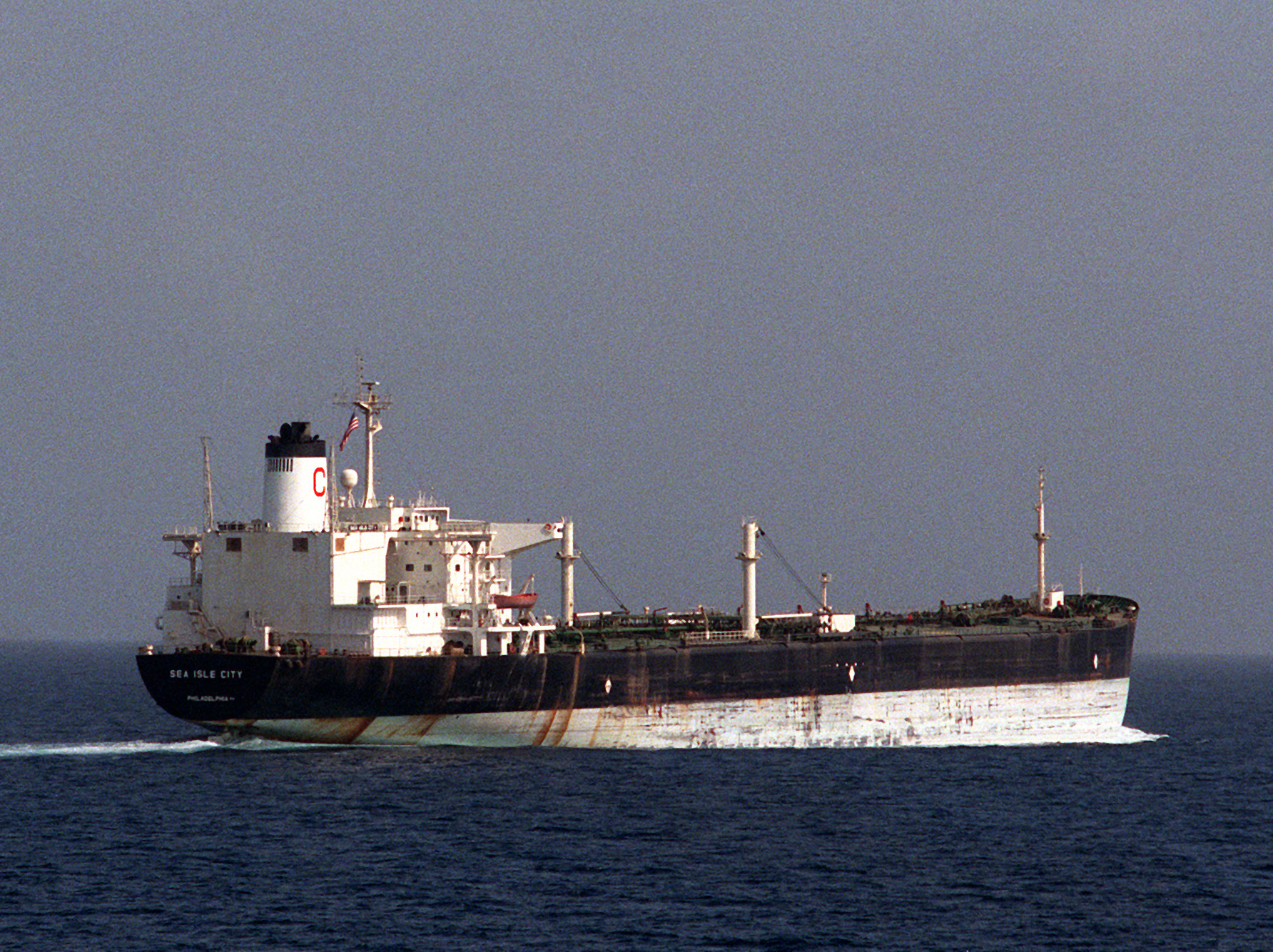
- Sea Isle City en route to Kuwait August 1987

History
- Name: 1981: Umm al Maradem; 1987: Sea Isle City; 2002: Sea Isle
- Namesake: 1981: Umm al Maradem Island; 1987: Sea Isle City, New Jersey
- Owner: 1981: Kuwait Oil Tanker Company; 1987: Chesapeake Shipping, Inc.; later: Keystone Shipping Company
- Port of registry: 1977: Kuwait; 1987: (United States) Philadelphia
- Route: late 1990s: Persian Gulf to Indonesia
- Builder: Mitsubishi Heavy Industries
- Yard number: 1867
- In service: 1981
- Out of service: 2002
- Identification: Call sign WCYQ; IMO number: 7924918
- Fate: broken up, 2002, India

General characteristics
- Class & type: Tank Ship, Sequence M2NMFN, Hull form H
- Tonnage: 96,888 DWT; 51,397 GT ITC; 29,763 NET
- Length: 728.5 ft (222.0 m)
- Beam: 144.4 ft (44.0 m)
- Draft: 61.0 ft (18.6 m)
- Propulsion: Sulzer
- Speed: 15 kn (28 km/h)
- Notes: References

MV Sea Isle City, ex-Umm al Maradem, was a Kuwait Oil Company oil tanker that reflagged during Operation Earnest Will. The ship was completed in 1981 by Mitsubishi Heavy Industries, Japan, as hull number 1867, for the Kuwait Oil Tanker Company.

== Missile attack ==
Sea Isle City was struck during the Tanker War phase of the Iran–Iraq War by an Iranian Silkworm missile launched from the Iranian occupied Al-Faw Peninsula at 05:30 A.M. on 16 October 1987. The missile struck the wheel house and crew quarters of the ship. The ship was not carrying oil at the time it was struck and was moving to be loaded. The ship's master, a US citizen, was blinded and a total of 18 crew members were wounded. Sea Isle City was in Kuwaiti waters and was no longer under the protection of US escort ships. Sea Isle City was heavily damaged by the missile and it took 4 months to repair the damage to the bridge and crew area.

Approximate location of Sea Isle City when struck by Silkworm missile

The US later undertook Operation Nimble Archer in response to the attack, destroying two oil platforms in the Rostam oil field that were not in production and being used as tactical communication relay points, radar tracking stations and as bases of operations for helicopter and speed boat attacks on maritime shipping in international waters. According to documents seized during the raid on the platform, the Rostam platform's radar had tracked the convoy containing Sea Isle City while it was en route to Kuwait and relayed this tactical information via communications gear on the platform.

Sea Isle City lookout Victorino Gonzaga, a Philippines national, was also blinded in the attack and treated at the Bascom Palmer Eye Institute, in Miami, where doctors were forced to remove both of his eyes. Gonzaga and his wife filed suit against Iran, naming Chesapeake Shipping Co., the Kuwait Oil Tanker Co., Kuwait Petroleum Corp. and Gleneagle Ship Management Inc. as co-defendants. The companies named settled out of court for $750,000. 14 months after the suit was filed, a Miami judge found the Government in Tehran liable and awarded $1.2 million to him and $500,000 to his wife. No representatives for Iran ever appeared before the court and at the time it was unclear if he would ever receive the compensation.

== Fate ==
Some of the reflagged tankers returned to Kuwaiti flags in January 1989, but Sea Isle City and several others remained US-flagged. Sea Isle City was operated on a Persian Gulf to Indonesia route by Keystone Shipping Company in the 1990s and early 2000s. The tanker was listed out of service in May 2002 in the United States Coast Guard database. and scrapped in India in August 2002.
