= USS Sample =

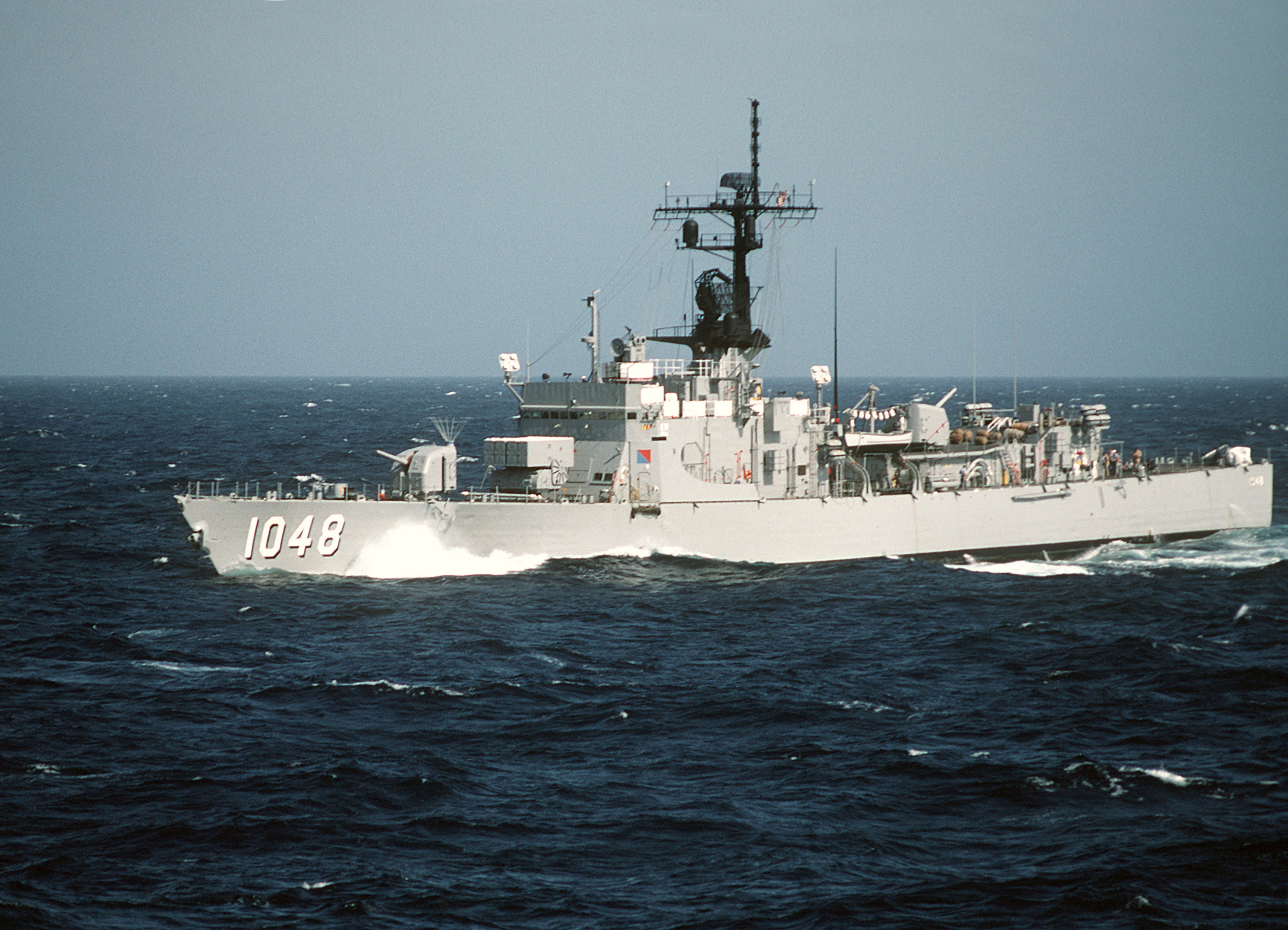
- USS Sample (DE/FF-1048)

History

United States
- Name: Sample
- Namesake: William Sample
- Ordered: 20 March 1963
- Builder: Lockheed Shipbuilding and Construction Company, Seattle, Washington
- Laid down: 19 July 1963
- Launched: 28 April 1964
- Acquired: 15 March 1968
- Commissioned: 23 March 1968
- Decommissioned: 23 September 1988
- Stricken: 24 January 2001
- Honors and awards: Five campaign stars for Vietnam War service
- Fate: Leased to Brazil, 1989.; Disposed of through the Security Assistance Program (SAP), transferred, Foreign Assistance Act (FAA) Section 516, Southern Region Amendment, 24 January 2001

Brazil
- Name: Parana
- Acquired: 15 April 1989 via lease
- Out of service: November 2004
- Identification: D29
- Fate: Sold November 2004 to Arusha Shipping, Ltd for scrap.

General characteristics
- Class & type: Garcia-class frigate
- Displacement: 2,624 tons (light)
- Length: 414 ft 6 in (126.34 m)
- Beam: 44 ft 1 in (13.44 m)
- Draft: 24 ft 6 in (7.47 m)
- Propulsion: 2 Foster-Wheeler boilers, 1 steam turbine, 35,000 shp, single screw
- Speed: 27 knots
- Range: 4,000 nautical miles (7,000 km) at 20 knots (40 km/h)
- Complement: 16 officers; 231 enlisted
- Sensors & processing systems: AN/SPS-40 air search radar; AN/SPS-10 surface search radar; AN/SQS-26 bow mounted sonar
- Armament: 2 × single 5 in (127 mm)/38 cal. Mk 30 guns; 1 × 8-tube ASROC Mk16 launcher (16 missiles); 2 × triple 12.75 in (324 mm) Mk 32 torpedo tubes, Mk 46 torpedoes; 2 × MK 37 torpedo tubes (fixed, stern) (removed later)
- Aircraft carried: Gyrodyne QH-50 (planned) / SH-2 LAMPS

USS Sample (FF-1048) was a frigate in the US Navy and the seventh in her class, named for William Dodge Sample (9 March 1898 – 2 October 1945) who was a rear admiral in the United States Navy and an Escort Carrier Division commander in World War II. Sample was the youngest rear admiral in the Pacific Theater of World War II. She was laid down in 1963 and decommissioned in 1988, then transferred to Brazil in 1989.

== History ==
Sample (DE-1048) was laid down on 19 July 1963 by the Puget Sound Bridge and Dry Dock Co., Lockheed Aircraft Corp., Seattle, Washington; launched on 28 April 1964; sponsored by Mrs. David M. Abshire, daughter of Rear Admiral Sample; and commissioned on 23 March 1968.

On completion of shakedown, Sample, initially assigned to Destroyer Squadron 29 (DesRon 29) at Long Beach and was ordered to Pearl Harbor and duty in DesDiv 252, DesRon 25. She arrived at her home port for the first time on 18 October 1968, but was damaged by O'Bannon the following day. Repairs to her sonar dome forced her return to the Puget Sound area, and on 21 January 1969, she departed Bangor to return to Hawaii.

During the remainder of the winter and into the spring, Sample remained in Hawaiian waters. In mid-April, she sailed west on her first deployment to the western Pacific and duty with the 7th Fleet. Toward the end of the month, she arrived at Yokosuka, thence continued on to Okinawa and the Philippines. In early May, she arrived in Subic Bay, whence she proceeded to Tonkin Gulf for patrol and escort duty with the carriers supporting operations in South Vietnam. In June, she departed Subic for Taiwan, and during July, she operated with the Taiwan Strait Patrol. At the end of the month, she returned to Japan, but in early August, she was back in the South China Sea. At mid-month, she resumed Taiwan Strait patrol duties and on August 22, again steamed for Japan.

In mid-September, Sample departed Yokosuka and sailed south again, operated briefly on patrol off Taiwan, then continued on to the Philippines. At the end of the month, she conducted special operations in the northeastern South China Sea; and, after a call at Hong Kong, headed back to Taiwan and Japan. On 18 October, she departed the latter for Pearl Harbor and a return to duty with the 1st Fleet.

Sample remained in the eastern Pacific into the summer of 1970. On 14 July, she departed Hawaii for her second WestPac deployment. Eight days later, she joined the 7th Fleet, and on 28 July, she arrived in Subic Bay. On 1 August, she got underway for duty as escort for the aircraft carrier USS Oriskany on Yankee Station. She operated with TG 77.5 in Tonkin Gulf until 25 August, then steamed for Taiwan, arriving at Kaohsiung on the 27th. By 5 September, she was back at Subic, and on 15 September, she resumed duty with TG 77.5. On 29 September, she returned to Subic, underwent boiler repairs, and sailed for Okinawa on 3 October. Arriving on 6 October, she continued on to Japan, where from 19 to 27 October, she participated in joint United States-Japan exercises in the Sea of Japan. A call at Hong Kong followed her departure from Japan, and on 13 November, she arrived at Keelung, Taiwan. Two days later, she continued on to Sasebo, whence she conducted exercises in the Sea of Japan, then steamed for Yokosuka. On 6 December, she departed the latter port and headed for home.

Sample returned to Pearl Harbor on 12 December. A postdeployment period of leave and liberty took her into the new year, 1971. Sample spent the entire year in Hawaii, either in port at Pearl Harbor or cruising in the local operating area. During the latter part of January, she began a period of availability, including a drydock period, which lasted until June. From June to December, she operated in Hawaiian waters, first undergoing trials, then refresher training, and finally participating in antisubmarine warfare exercises. The end of 1971 and the beginning of 1972 brought preparations for overseas movement. On 27 January 1972, Sample got underway for an extended deployment to WesPac. During the major portion of 1972, she alternated between SAR, PIRAZ, and naval gunfire-support duties off the coast of Vietnam. She departed Vietnamese waters on 10 August and re-entered Pearl Harbor on the 25th.

She remained in port for the remainder of the year, engaged in postdeployment standdown and in restricted availability, the only exception being her participation in COMTUEX 4-72 between 4 and 8 December. Sample remained in Hawaii until 14 May 1973, when she redeployed to the western Pacific. After another seven months plying the waters of the Far East, she re-entered Pearl Harbor on 8 December. As of May 1974, Sample was still in port at Pearl Harbor. Sample was decommissioned on 23 September 1988.

== Brazilian Navy service ==
Sample was leased to Brazil on 15 April 1989 and transferred outright to Brazil on 24 January 2001, being stricken from the U.S. Navy Naval Vessel Register the same day. She served in the Brazilian Navy as Paraná (D29).

Parana was sold for scrapping in Pakistan in December 2004.

== Honors and awards ==
By May 1974, Sample had received five campaign stars for service off Vietnam.
