= RS RocketShip =

Cargo ship owned by United Launch Alliance

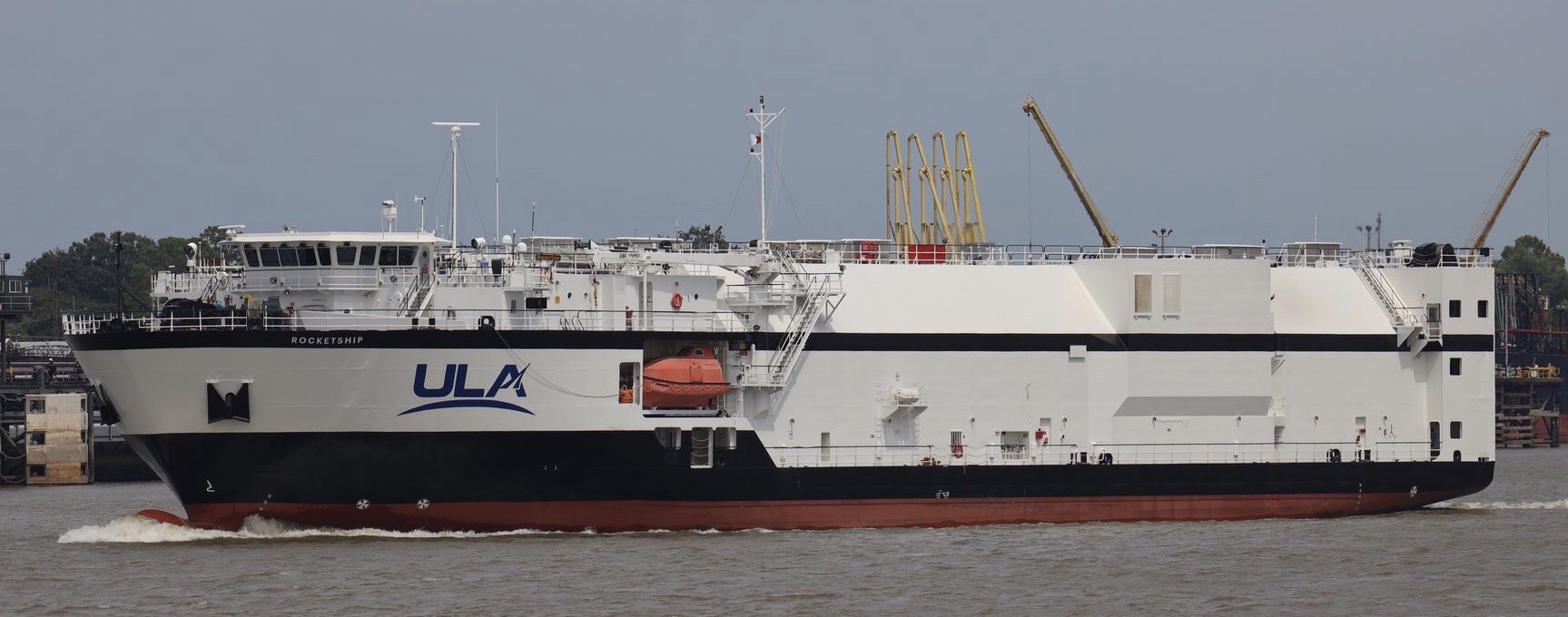
- R/S RocketShip in 2019

History
- Name: MV Delta Mariner (1999-2019); RS RocketShip (2019-present)
- Owner: Banc of America Leasing & Capital
- Operator: Keystone Shipping Company
- Port of registry: Port Canaveral, Florida
- Builder: Halter Marine; Moss Point, Mississippi
- Laid down: October 26, 1998
- Launched: December 16, 1999
- Christened: December 16, 1999
- In service: May 18, 2000
- Recommissioned: September 27, 2019
- Identification: Call sign: WCZ7837; IMO number: 9198501; MMSI number: 338731000

General characteristics
- Type: Roll-on/roll-off cargo ship
- Tonnage: 8,679 GT; 3,953 NT; 3,887.6 LT DWT; 3,950 t DWT
- Length: 312.6 ft (95.28 m)
- Beam: 82.0 ft (24.99 m)
- Height: 50 ft (15.2 m)
- Draft: 15.2 ft (4.64 m)
- Depth: 20.0 ft (6.09 m)
- Installed power: 2 × General Motors 16-710-G7A engines; (4,000 hp/2,983 kW each); 4 × Caterpillar 3412C generator engines; (831 hp/620 kW each); 1 × Caterpillar 3406C emergency engine; (371 hp/277 kW)
- Speed: 15 kn (28 km/h; 17 mph) (max. ocean); 5 kn (9.3 km/h; 5.8 mph) (max. river)
- Crew: 16 + river pilots

R/S RocketShip, formerly M/V Delta Mariner, is a roll-on/roll-off cargo ship operated by Keystone Shipping Company for United Launch Alliance (ULA). Her primary role is transporting components for the ULA Atlas V, Delta IV and Vulcan rockets from the manufacturer, located in Decatur, Alabama, to launch facilities at Cape Canaveral Space Force Station in Florida and Vandenberg Space Force Base in California.

The ship is designed for shallow inland waterways as well as the open ocean and is capable of carrying up to three 160-foot-long (49 m) Delta IV Common Booster Cores. Some cargos carried by RocketShip were formerly transported by an Antonov An-124 Ruslan from the manufacturer to the launch site.

== History ==
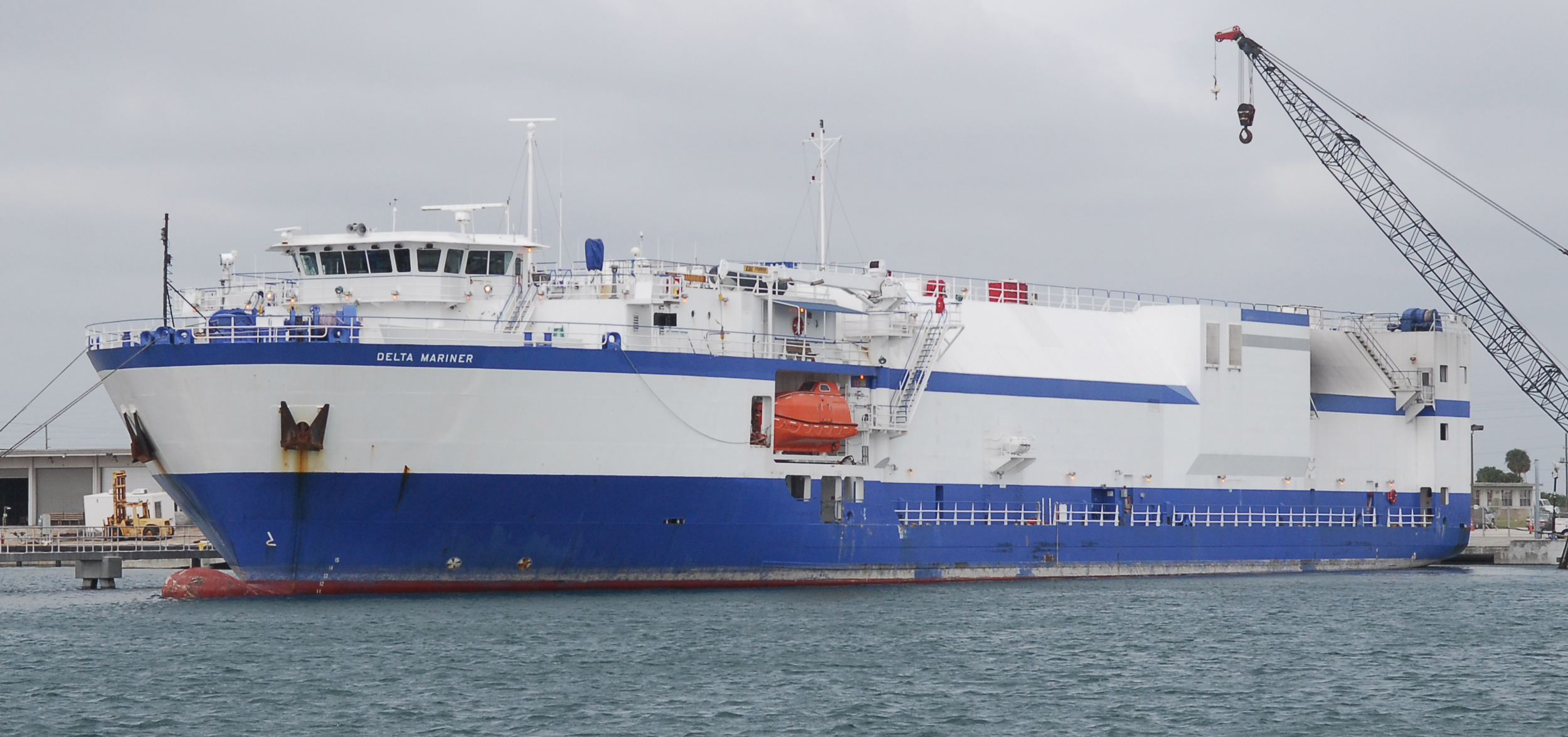
As Delta Mariner docked at Port Canaveral, Florida, 2008

Use of Delta Mariner was transferred to ULA after the company was created in 2006 to handle all United States military launch services. ULA is a 50/50 joint venture created out of the rocket manufacturing and launch service businesses of Boeing and Lockheed Martin for their Delta and Atlas V launch vehicles, respectively. For ULA, the ship has transported the Atlas V, Delta IV and Delta II rockets under the Delta Mariner livery.

On September 27, 2019, United Launch Alliance re-christened the vessel RocketShip in a ceremony at its factory in Decatur.

=== Shipping routes ===
Completed rocket stages and other components are transported by truck approximately 1.5 miles (2.4 km) from the Decatur manufacturing facility to the dock on the Tennessee River and driven directly onto the ship.

From Decatur, RocketShip takes the Tennessee and Ohio Rivers downstream, south on the Mississippi River, and into the Gulf of Mexico, a trip of more than 1,000 miles (1,600 km).

Once in the Gulf, RocketShip may travel around the Florida peninsula to Cape Canaveral, a 2,100-mile (3,400 km) trip; or through the Panama Canal to Vandenberg, a three-week journey which covers around 5,000 miles (8,000 km).

=== Incidents ===
==== Grounding ====
On August 7, 2001, Delta Mariner ran aground on a sandbar in the Tennessee River during its initial docking attempt at Decatur. This was Delta Mariner's first arrival at the dock since its launch. The vessel was freed by a tugboat about an hour after the incident.

==== Bridge collision ====
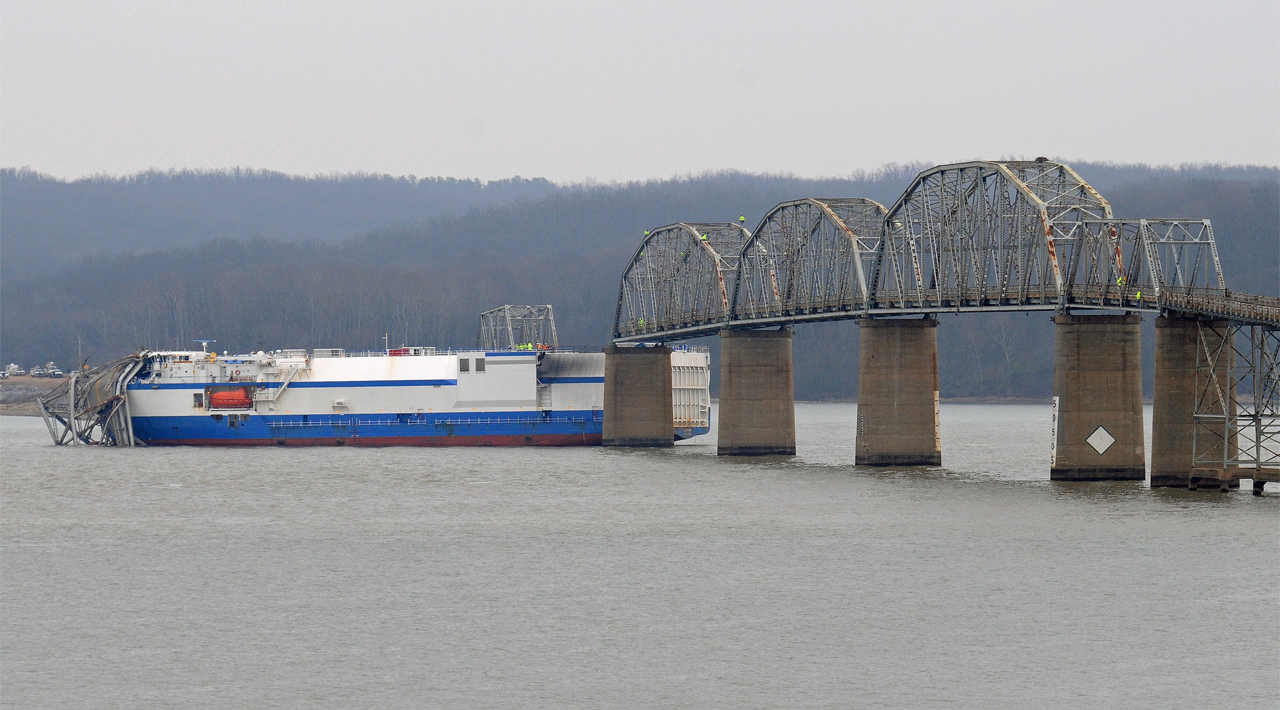
Delta Mariner after its collision with Eggner's Ferry Bridge

On January 26, 2012, around 20:10 CST, Delta Mariner struck the Eggner's Ferry Bridge, which crosses Kentucky Lake near Murray and Cadiz, Kentucky. There were no injuries on the ship or bridge, and, while Delta Mariner was "not severely damaged" and the cargo of Atlas and Centaur stages was undamaged, the collision destroyed a 322-foot (98 m) section of the bridge.

According to Foss Maritime's spokesman, this was on the regular route taken by the vessel. U.S. Coast Guard officials state the vessel was operating in a recreational channel at the time of the collision, rather than the shipping channel which offers greater bridge clearance. Foss representatives stated that the bridge's channel navigation lights were not operational, though Kentucky Transportation Cabinet (KYTC) Secretary Mike Hancock stated this should not have been a significant factor in the incident and KYTC spokesman Keith Todd said he believes most of the lights were functioning at the time.

The ship remained anchored at the bridge after the incident took place so that salvage plans could be developed and equipment moved into place. Salvage operations were led by T&T Bisso of Houston, with assistance from local and regional companies. During February 4–5, salvage divers worked to remove debris which caught underwater on Delta Mariner's hull. On February 6, the vessel was freed from the underwater debris and the Coast Guard approved its relocation to a safe harbor one mile downriver so that its bow could be cleared. By February 14, the bridge debris had been cleared and the vessel had relocated to the James Marine drydock in Paducah, Kentucky, to undergo repairs. Delta Mariner was cleared by the American Bureau of Shipping on February 17 to proceed on its journey, and it docked at Port Canaveral, Florida, on February 23.

In their investigation, the National Transportation Safety Board concluded that "the bridge team's exclusive reliance on the contract pilot's incorrect navigational direction as the vessel approached the bridge and their failure to use all available navigation tools to verify the safety of the vessel's course" was the cause of the incident, noting that the bridge crew ignored two Coast Guard broadcasts and a radio call from the vessel Addi Bell regarding navigational lights being out at the bridge. The NTSB cited the KYTC's failure to maintain the bridge's navigational lighting as a contributing factor; white navigation lights had been out of service for over a year and additional navigation lights indicating the bridge's high point had shorted out in the days leading up to the incident.

Repairs to the bridge, led by Hall Contracting, cost more than US$7 million according to the KYTC, and costs associated with repairs to Delta Mariner and removal of debris from its hull were estimated at US$2,583,750. The bridge reopened on May 25, 2012. In 2017, Foss Maritime agreed to pay US$3,375,000 to the KYTC as settlement in the incident.

== Gallery ==
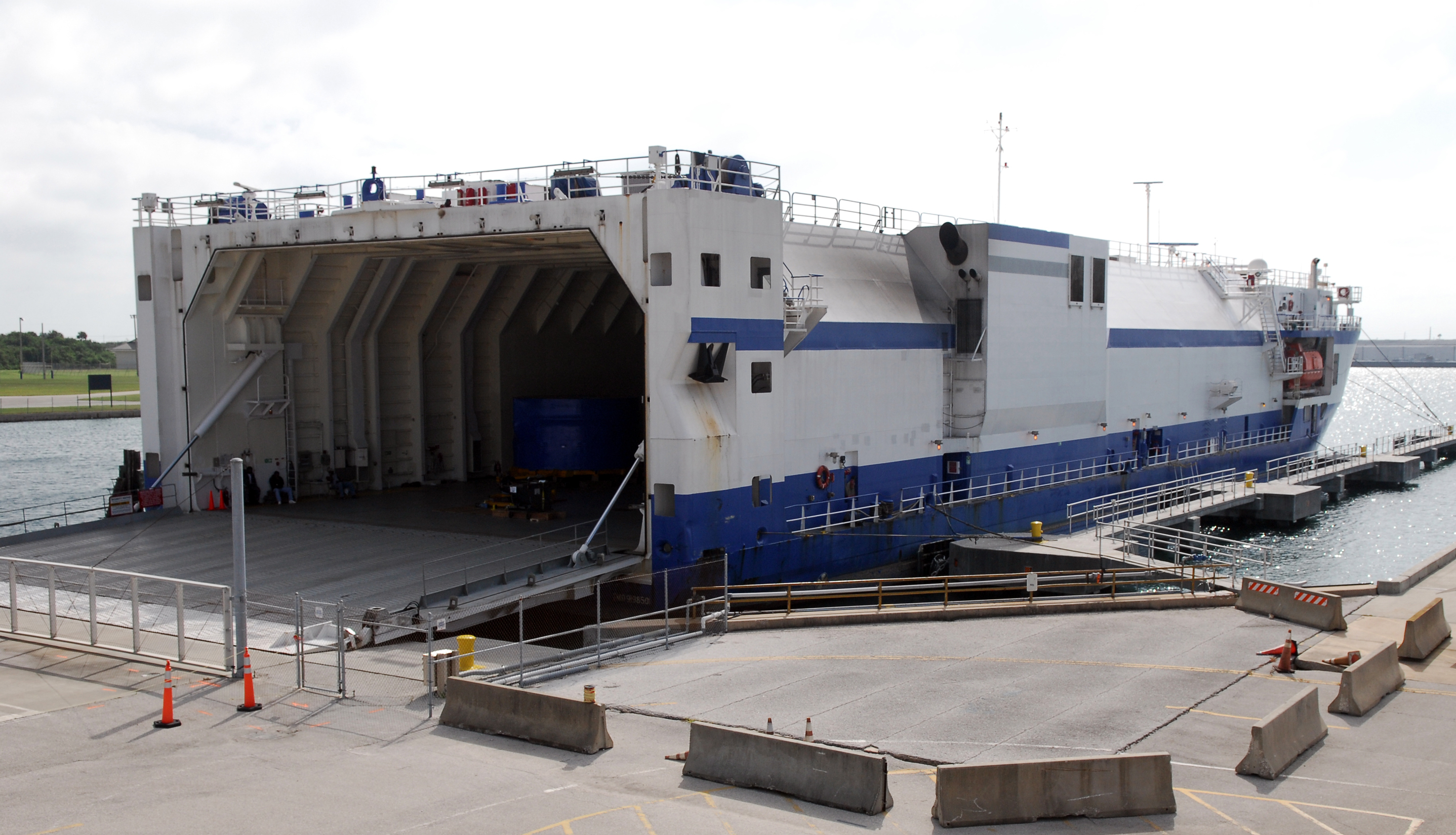
Delta Mariner during offload of Ares I-X upper stage simulators

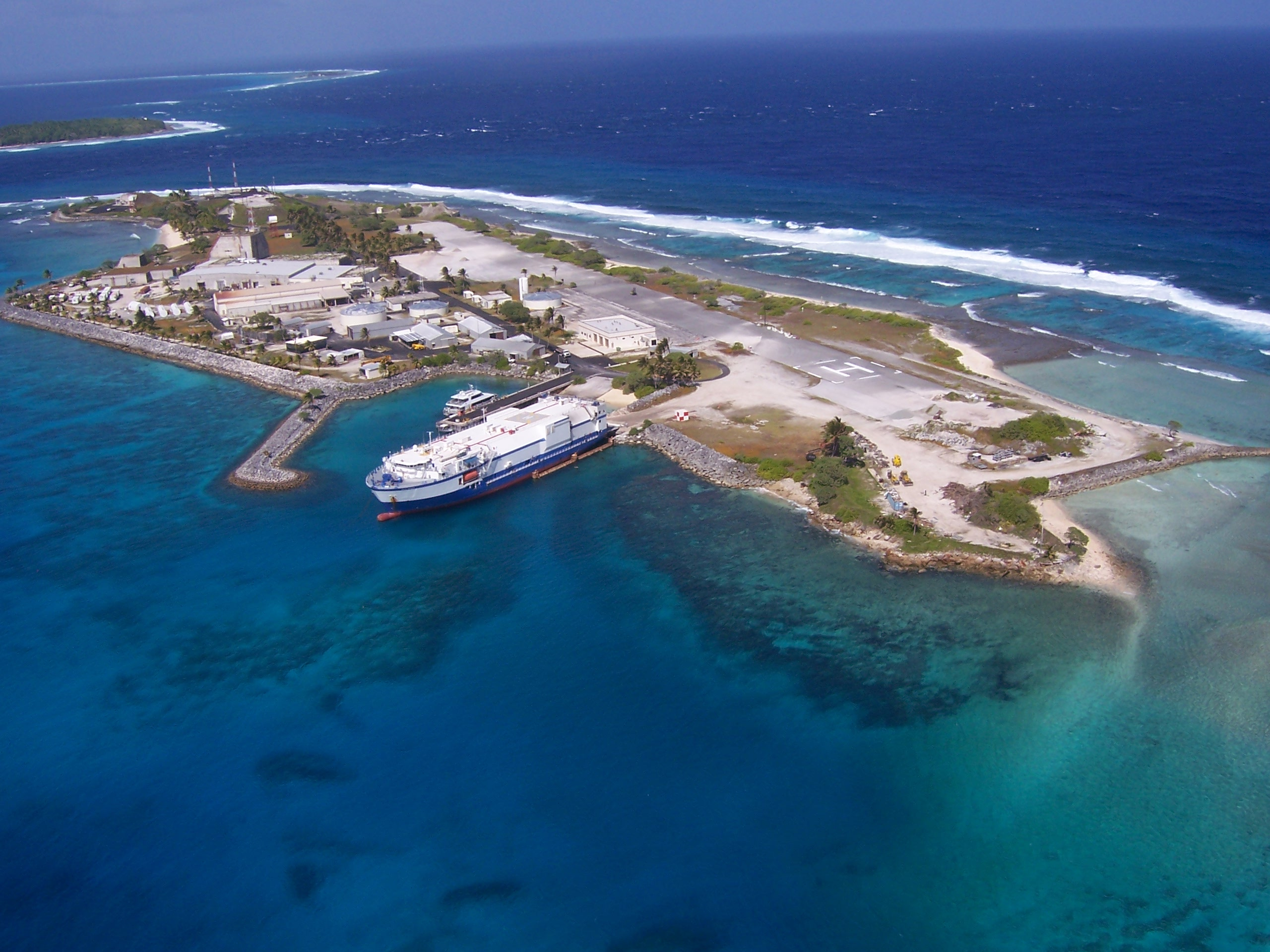
Delta Mariner docked at Meck Island, 2009

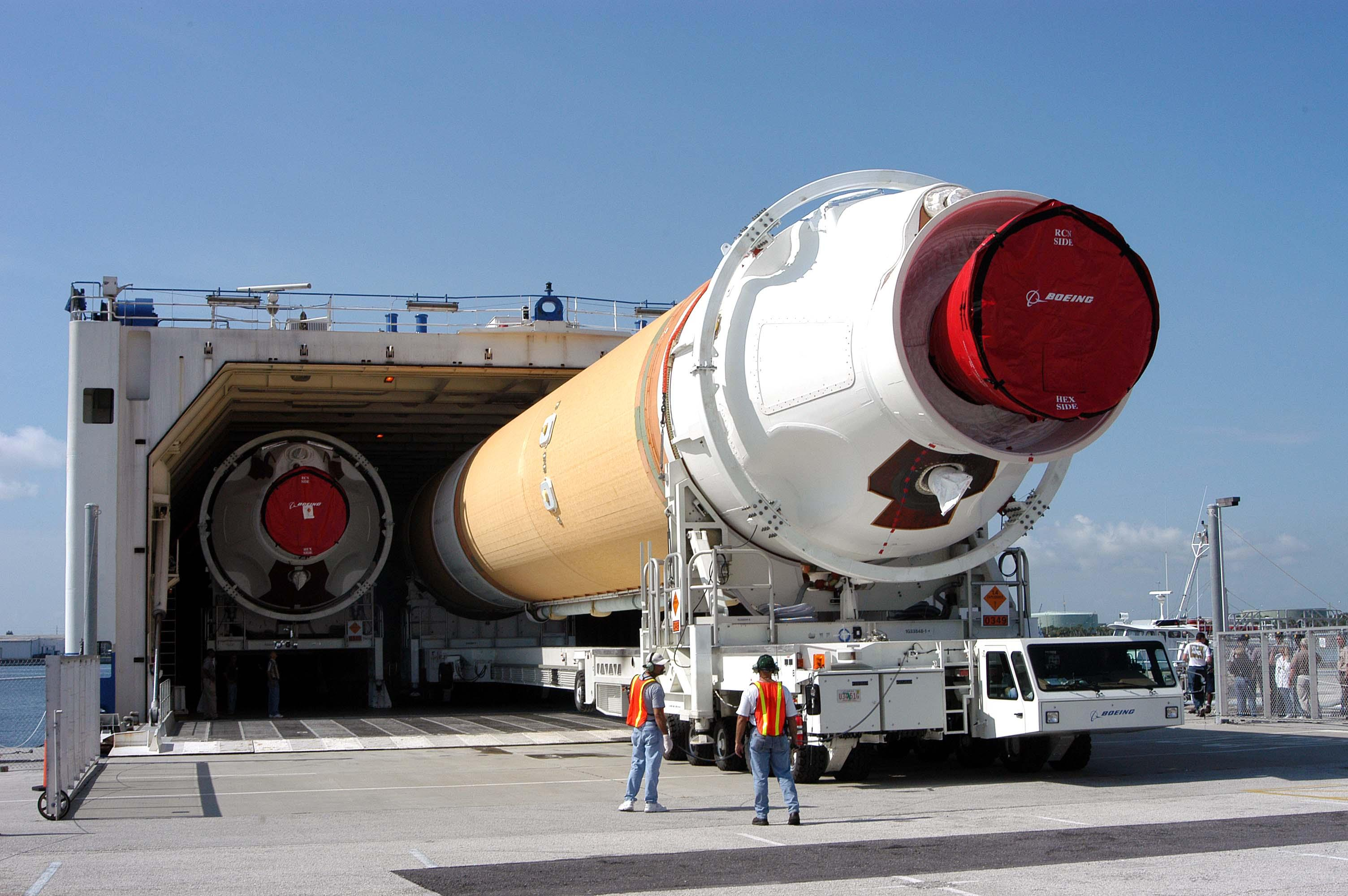
Delta IV Common Booster Cores offloading from Delta Mariner at Cape Canaveral

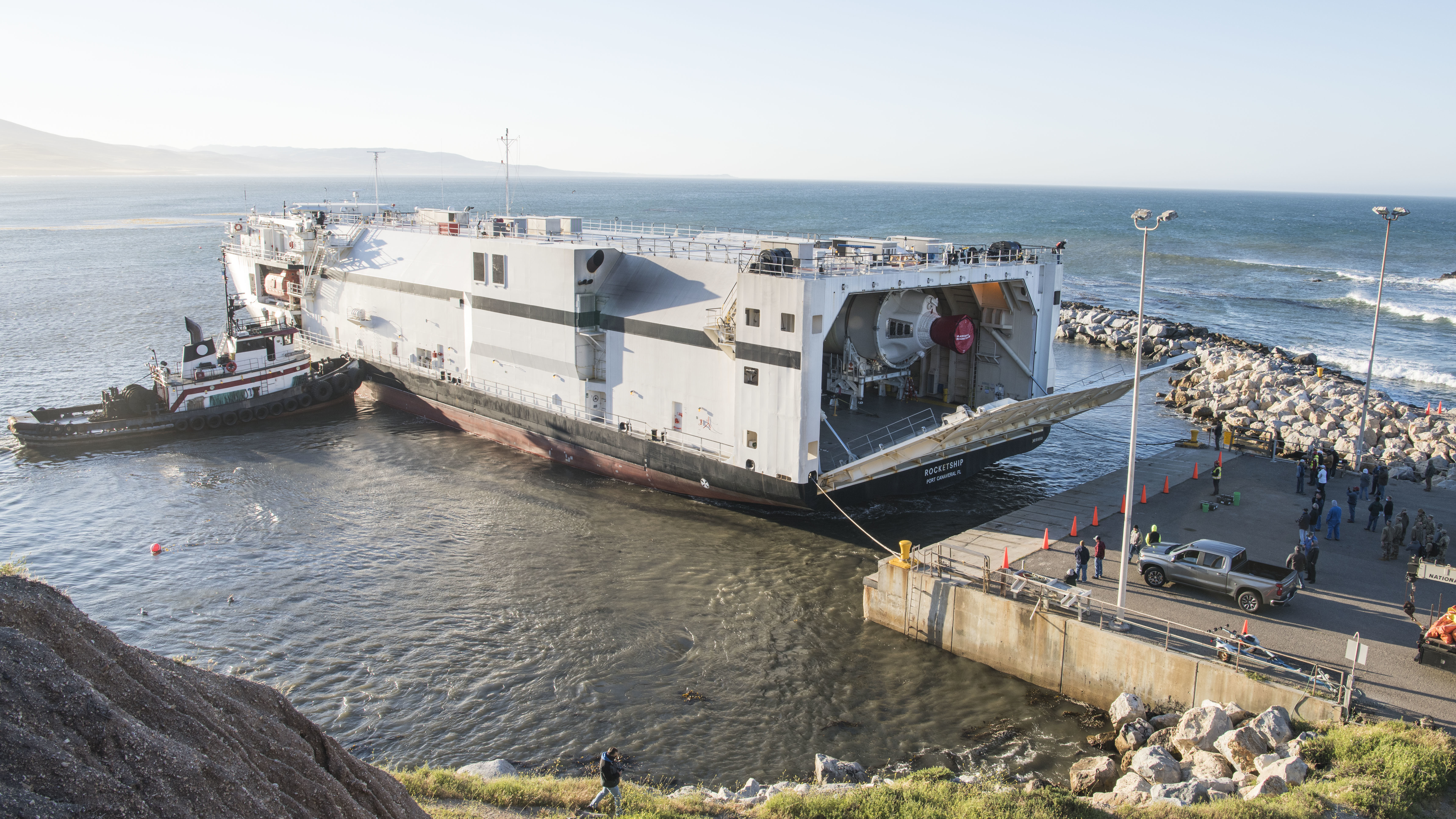
RocketShip preparing to offload Delta IV Common Booster Cores at Vandenburg
