= William Sample =

United States Navy admiral (1898–1945)

William Dodge Sample
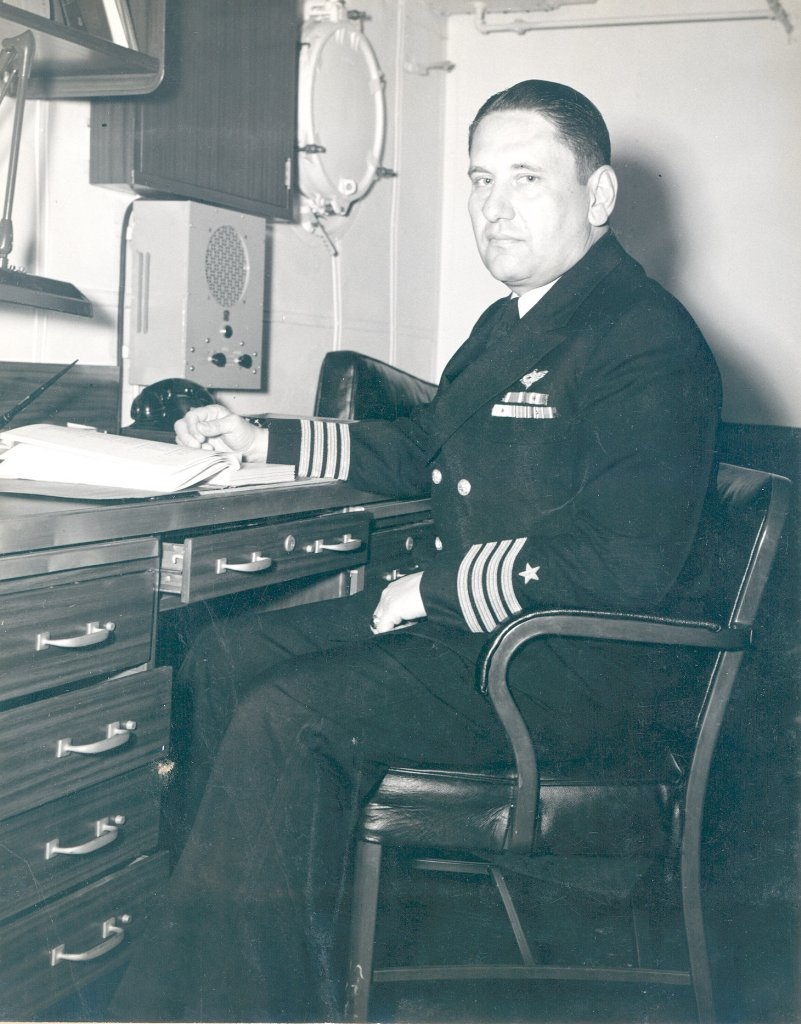
- Born: March 9, 1898; Buffalo, New York, US
- Died: October 2, 1945 (aged 47) over Japan
- Burial place: Arlington National Cemetery
- Military career
- Allegiance: United States of America
- Branch: United States Navy
- Service years: 1918–1945
- Rank: Rear admiral
- Commands: Scouting Squadron VS-1; Fighter Squadron VF-5; USS Santee (CVE-29); USS Intrepid (CV-11); USS Hornet (CV-12); Carrier Division 27; Carrier Division 22
- Conflicts: World War I World War II
- Awards: Legion of Merit; Navy Commendation Medal

William Dodge Sample (March 9, 1898 – October 2, 1945) was a rear admiral in the United States Navy and an Escort Carrier Division commander in World War II. He was the youngest rear admiral in the Pacific Theater of World War II.

== World War I and early career ==
Sample was born in Buffalo, New York, and graduated from the United States Naval Academy at Annapolis, Maryland, in June 1918.

During World War I, Sample served aboard the transport Henderson. For meritorious service during a fire onboard Henderson, he received a letter of commendation from the Secretary of the Navy. Detached in August 1918, he served on several destroyers based at Queenstown, Ireland. He remained in the European Waters Detachment after the end of World War I.

In December 1921, Sample was transferred to the gunboat Pampanga in the Asiatic Fleet.

Sample attended flight training at Naval Air Station Pensacola, Florida, and was designated a naval aviator on June 23, 1923. Shortly thereafter, he served as commanding officer of Scouting Squadron VS-1. In the 1920s, he successively served in the aviation departments of the light cruisers Raleigh and Richmond, and battleships Arizona and New York.

Sample served on board the aircraft carriers Saratoga and Lexington, commanding Fighter Squadron VF-5B on the latter from 1932 to 1934. Promoted to lieutenant commander, Sample saw duty at the Bureau of Aeronautics from 1935 to 1937, followed by duty as navigator on Ranger in 1938. In 1939, Sample was assigned as air operations officer on Yorktown. His last duty before World War II was as supervisor of aviation training at Naval Air Station Pensacola, Florida.

== World War II ==
At the outbreak of World War II, he assisted in the conversion of the oil tanker Santee into an escort carrier. Shortly thereafter, he was promoted to commander. Assuming command of Santee on her commissioning, he was awarded a letter of commendation for service during Operation Torch, the invasion of North Africa.

Captain Sample assumed command of Intrepid on April 19, 1944. In May 1944, he was transferred to serve as commanding officer of Hornet, and in the ensuing months, he participated in the Battle of the Philippine Sea and a strike against the Volcano Islands.

In late summer 1944, Sample was promoted to rear admiral, planting his flag aboard the escort carrier Marcus Island as commander, Carrier Division 27 (CarDiv 27), for the invasion of Palau. In October 1944, at the Battle of Leyte Gulf, his CarDiv 27 was part of Task Unit 77.4.2 (TU 77.4.2, otherwise known as Taffy II) at the Battle off Samar under Rear Admiral Felix B. Stump. In early 1945, Commander, CarDiv 27, and Marcus Island supported the Invasion of Lingayen Gulf, Philippines. For the Invasion of Okinawa, Sample moved his flag to CarDiv 22 and Suwannee.

During the Leyte invasion, Rear Admiral Sample "desired a better view of operations" and decided to hitch a ride in a Grumman TBF Avenger torpedo bomber. He lay in the "tunnel gun" position and observed through the window below the tail. The plane was hit by antiaircraft fire. Sample was severely cut on the head and shoulders. James C. Edinger, ARM3c, USNR, of Foxburg, Pennsylvania), came down from the "blister" where he was manning a .50 in (12.7 mm) machine gun, and applied first aid. Edinger said that they needed more than an hour to return to Marcus Island, during which he kept kicking Sample in the face with his foot to keep the admiral from passing out. Sample was a big man; Edinger was afraid that if they ended up in the water, he would be unable to get him out of the plane. Each time, Sample would warn Edinger to make sure the .30 in (7.6 mm) machine gun in the tail was empty. He was afraid that when they landed, the gun would go off. Later in the state room, Sample explained to Edinger that he could see the headlines in the paper, "Admiral lands upon carrier: shoots hole in deck". According to the ship's surgeon, Commander Lee, "the excellence of Edinger's treatment helped prevent infection". Admiral Sample was awarded the Purple Heart, and at Sample's request, Edinger was promoted to aviation radio man, second class.

== Awards ==
Sample received the Legion of Merit for his service as commanding officer of the Hornet on June 20, 1944.

== Death ==
On October 2, 1945, shortly after the war ended, Sample was listed as missing after his Martin PBM Mariner aircraft failed to return from a familiarization flight near Wakayama, Japan. Rear Admiral Sample was officially declared dead on October 3, 1946.

The remains of Sample, Capt. Charles C. McDonald of Suwannee (CVE-27), and the remaining nine members of the flight crew were discovered in the wreckage of the aircraft on November 19, 1948, recovered, and returned to the United States to be interred together at Arlington National Cemetery

== Family ==
He was married to Mary Lee Lamar of Pensacola, Florida. They had one daughter, Carolyn Lamar Sample, who lived in Alexandria, Virginia, with her husband David M. Abshire.

== Namesake ship ==
- The frigate USS Sample (FF-1048) was commissioned on March 23, 1968.
