= Eggner's Ferry Bridge =

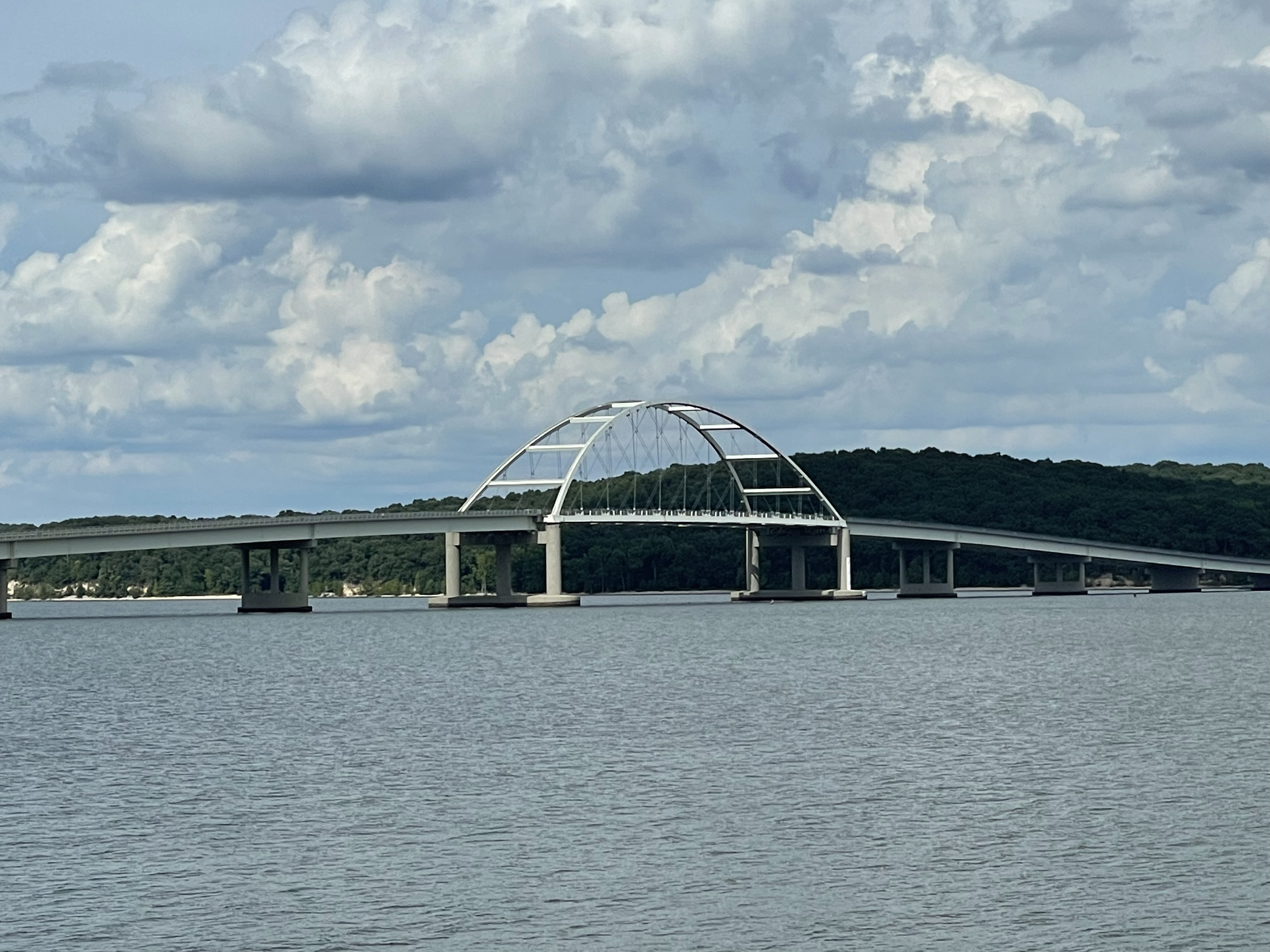
- The new Eggner's Ferry Bridge, viewed from the south in August 2022
- Coordinates: 36.772408°N 88.120995°W
- Carries: 4 lanes of US 68 / KY 80, pedestrians and bicycles
- Crosses: Kentucky Lake
- Locale: Trigg and Marshall counties, Kentucky, United States
- Maintained by: Kentucky Transportation Cabinet (KYTC)

Characteristics
- Design: Tied-arch bridge
- Total length: 3,495 feet (1,065 m)
- Longest span: 550 feet (170 m)

History
- Opened: March 25, 1932 (Original bridge); April 7, 2016 (Current bridge)
- Closed: April 7, 2016 (Original bridge); Original structure demolished July 25, 2016

Eggner Ferry Bridge, also known as Eggner's Ferry Bridge, is a four-lane bridge in Trigg and Marshall counties in the U.S. state of Kentucky. The current through-arch bridge opened to traffic on April 7, 2016, replacing a two-lane bowstring truss bridge constructed in 1932. The bridge carries US 68 and Kentucky Route 80 across Kentucky Lake. The main span of the original 1932 bridge collapsed on January 26, 2012, after it was hit by a ship. There were no injuries. The bridge was repaired and reopened to traffic on May 25 of that year. On the morning of July 25, 2016, the middle four spans of the old Eggner's Ferry Bridge were brought down using controlled explosives.

== History ==
The bridge was built to cross the Tennessee River before Kentucky Lake was planned. The bridge was opened to traffic on March 25, 1932.

On July 10, 1943, officials shut the bridge down for five months to build new pilings and raise the structure to make room for Kentucky Lake. A ferry was established to cross the river while the bridge was closed. Kentucky Governor Simeon S. Willis presided over the re-opening of the bridge in February 1944.

The bridge, plus a sister bridge that crosses nearby Lake Barkley, was slated to be replaced by a tied-arch bridge with four traffic lanes plus a sidewalk and bike path. Construction of the new bridges was initially scheduled to begin in 2011 as part of an upgrade to the existing 68/80 corridor. The project was expected to be completed in late 2017; however, due to damage by a ship strike in January 2012, the timetable was moved forward.

=== January 2012 incident ===
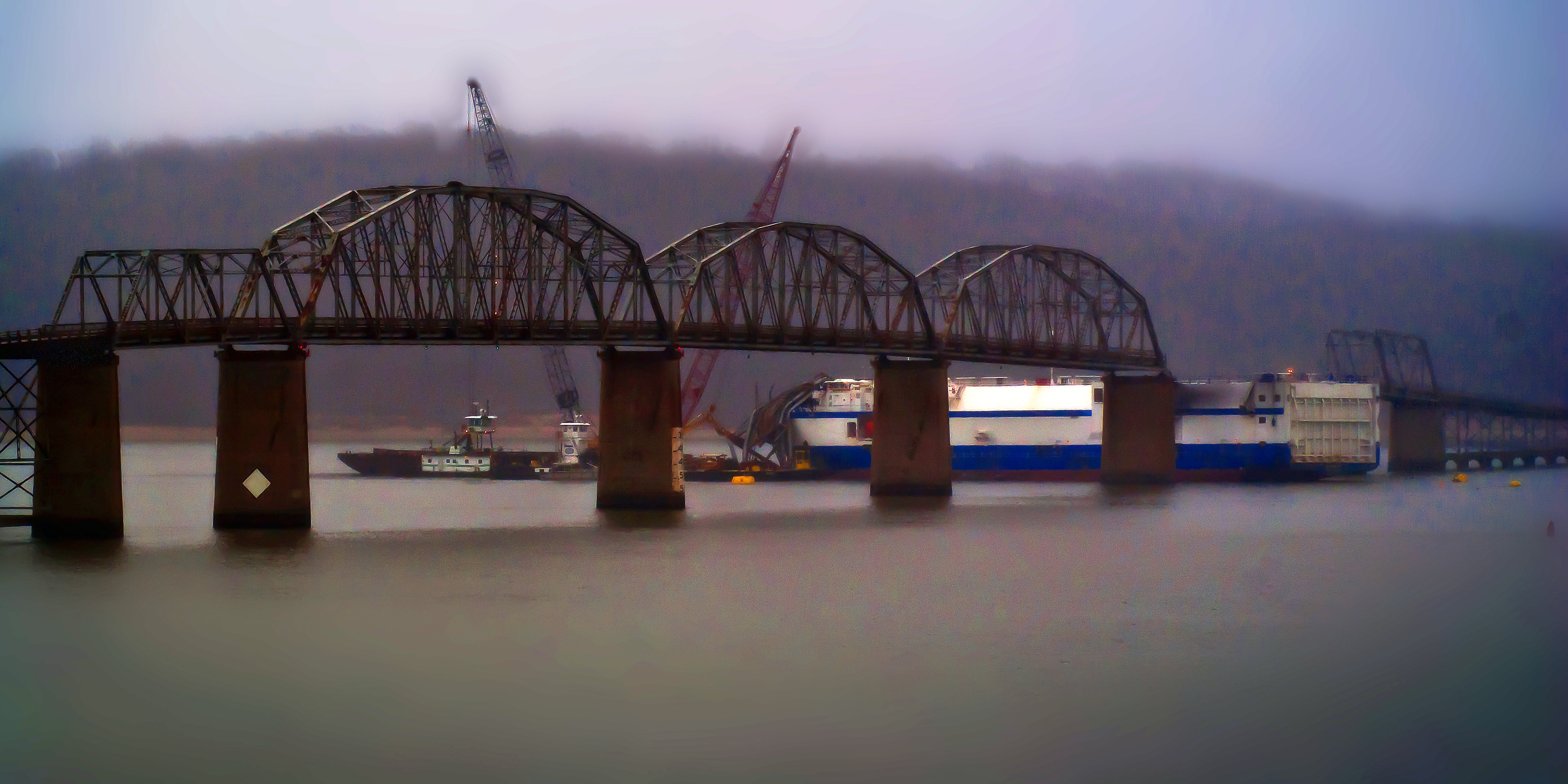
The original Eggner's Ferry Bridge in February 2012, with the MV Delta Mariner and destroyed span

A mainspan of the bridge collapsed after being struck by the cargo vessel MV Delta Mariner on January 26, 2012. At least four vehicles were reported to be on the bridge near the time of the collapse. One pickup truck stopped about 5 feet (1.5 m) from the edge of the missing section; the driver reported that two cars had stopped directly behind him, and he saw another car on the opposite side of the missing section. No injuries were reported.

The U.S. Coast Guard reported on January 27 that the Delta Mariner hit the bridge when it tried to pass through what is known as the recreational channel, which has a lower clearance, instead of the shipping channel, which the vessel normally used.

Reports indicate that some of the bridge's navigational lighting was inoperative at the time of the incident. Paducah television station WPSD-TV reported earlier in the week that the bridge was to be reduced to one lane on January 27 for a Kentucky Transportation Cabinet (KYTC) crew to repair the lights. KYTC spokesman Keith Todd stated that the lights facing the MV Delta Mariner were operational, and that the Coast Guard had made the lighting situation known to vessels operating on the waterway.

Kentucky Governor Steve Beshear announced that the state would immediately review all options for restoring the roadway to service. "We are grateful that this wreck caused no injuries or loss of life. Since that bridge carries 2,800 cars every day, we were very fortunate that no one was on the span at that time," said Beshear. "We'll turn our attention to a full inspection of the bridge and determine what steps we can take next to speed up the replacement of that important artery." An underwater inspection of the bridge also concluded that there was no significant damage to the piers.

An ongoing concern was the economic impact of the loss of the bridge. The collapse had an immediate impact on employees and students at Murray State University who normally crossed the bridge during their commutes. According to university officials, about 270 students who attend classes in Murray, 210 of them attending full-time, live in two counties (Trigg and Christian) for which the most direct route to campus is via the bridge. In addition, at the time of the collapse, the school's nursing students had a clinical placement in Hopkinsville, the county seat of Christian County. These individuals were forced to take a longer route to the university, increasing driving times by approximately an hour, and also increasing their fuel costs to cover the extra distance. University officials worked with students to identify and resolve problems caused by the bridge collapse.

On March 8, 2012, the Kentucky Transportation Cabinet awarded an emergency repair contract to Hall Contracting of Kentucky, Inc. The contract called for repairing and reopening the bridge before the upcoming Memorial Day weekend. The same company had also completed emergency repairs to the Sherman Minton Bridge between New Albany, Indiana and Louisville, Kentucky on a contract with the Indiana Department of Transportation. The bridge was reopened on May 25, 2012.

=== The current four-lane bridge ===
The new bridge opened for traffic on two lanes in summer of 2016. The old bridge was closed permanently in May 2016; on July 25, 2016, construction crews used explosives to demolish the original 1932 structure.
