= USS Saugatuck =

Oiler of the United States Navy

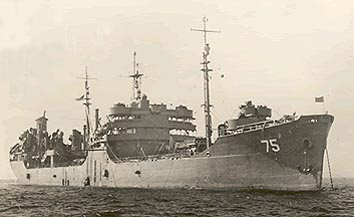
- USS Saugatuck

History

United States
- Name: USS Saugatuck
- Namesake: Saugatuck River in Connecticut
- Builder: Sun Shipbuilding & Drydock Co., Chester, Pennsylvania
- Laid down: 20 August 1942
- Launched: 7 December 1942
- Commissioned: 19 February 1943
- Decommissioned: 29 March 1946
- In service: 1948, as USNS Saugatuck (T-AOT-75)
- Out of service: 1974
- Renamed: Saugatuck, 16 September 1942
- Identification: IMO number: 7737432
- Honors and awards: 7 battle stars (World War II)
- Fate: Sold for scrapping, 2006

General characteristics
- Type: Suamico-class fleet replenishment oiler
- Displacement: 5,730 long tons (5,822 t) light; 21,880 long tons (22,231 t) full
- Length: 523 ft 10 in (159.66 m) o/a; 502 ft 10 in (153.26 m) p/p
- Beam: 67 ft 9 in (20.65 m)
- Draft: 30 ft 9 in (9.37 m)
- Propulsion: 2 × Babcock & Wilcox boilers, 42.2 kg/cm^2, 441 deg C.; Westinghouse geared turbines, Electric drive, 1 shaft, 6,600 hp (4,922 kW)
- Speed: 15 knots (28 km/h; 17 mph)
- Range: 13,000 nmi (24,000 km) at 15 kn (28 km/h; 17 mph)
- Capacity: 141,000 barrels (22,400 m^{3})
- Complement: USN: 251; MSTS: 52
- Armament: 1 × 5"/38 caliber gun; 4 × single 3"/50 caliber guns; 4 × twin 40 mm AA guns; 4 × twin 20 mm AA guns

USS Saugatuck (AO-75) was a Suamico-class replenishment oiler of the United States Navy.

The ship was laid down on 20 August 1942 as SS Newtown, a Maritime Commission type Type T2-SE-A1 tanker hull, under Maritime Commission contract (MC hull 355) at the Sun Shipbuilding & Drydock Co., Chester, Pennsylvania. She was renamed Saugatuck on 16 September 1942. Launched on 7 December 1942, and delivered to the U.S. Navy, she was converted for naval service at Bethlehem Steel Co., Key Highway Plant, Baltimore, Maryland. She was commissioned on 19 February 1943. It was named for the Saugatuck River in Connecticut.

== Service history ==
=== World War II, 1943–1945 ===
Following shakedown in Chesapeake Bay, Saugatuck departed Norfolk for the Netherlands West Indies and the Panama Canal. On 30 April, she transited the canal; and, the next day, headed for the South Pacific. Diverted en route, she was ordered first to Pearl Harbor, thence to San Pedro, California. During the summer and fall, she carried fuels and lubricants to Espiritu Santo and Funafuti. In December, she assumed duties as station oiler at Espiritu Santo. Late in January 1944, she put to sea to rendezvous with, and refuel, fleet units engaged in the Marshalls' campaign; and, by 5 February, she had begun fueling ships in Majuro Lagoon.

A week later, Saugatuck returned to Funafuti to receive more cargo. By June, she had completed three shuttle runs to Majuro: one from the Ellice Islands, one from California, and one from Hawaii. On 16 June, she moved into the Marianas.

For two days, she refueled ships of the Saipan assault force; then, late in the afternoon of the 18th, the refueling area was attacked by Japanese aircraft. The oilers were the targets. Saugatuck underwent three attacks during which she was peppered by shrapnel and strafing bullets. She lost only one of her crew during the 15-minute engagement, and within the hour, resumed refueling operations.

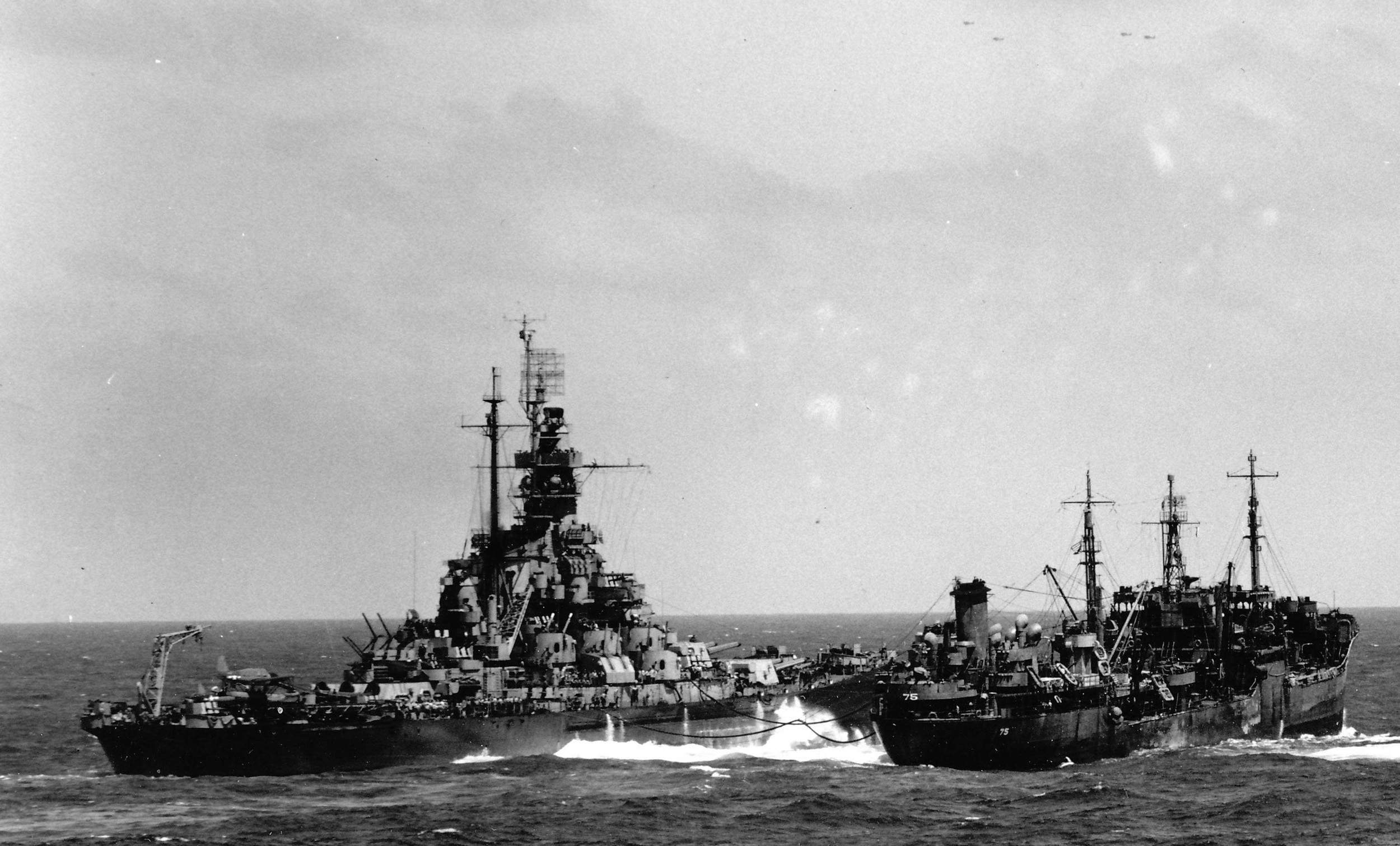
Saugatuck refueling the battleship Massachusetts in 1945

On the 19th, the battle of the Philippine Sea raged to the west. On the 20th, Saugatuck was detached from TU 16.7.5 and ordered back to the Marshalls. On the 25th and 26th, ATR-46 performed necessary repairs to her hull and equipment; and, into July, Saugatuck refueled ships at Eniwetok. On the 15th, she got underway back toward the Marianas. From the 18th to the 26th, she operated off Guam. On the 26th, she transferred her remnant cargo to Marias (AO-57); and, on the 29th, she returned to Eniwetok.

Three weeks later, Saugatuck moved further west; and, at the end of August, she commenced operations out of Seeadler Harbor in the Admiralties. From that base, north of New Guinea, she supported the units engaged in the assault and occupation of the Palaus in September, and of Leyte in October. She then shifted her base to Ulithi, whence she sortied to refuel units of the fast carrier force as it struck Japanese installations and shipping in the Philippines, Indochina, Formosa, and Ryukyus during November and December; as it supported the Lingayen assault force in January 1945; and as it hit the Japanese home islands in February. In March, Saugatuck moved into the Volcano Islands where she fueled ships supporting Marine units fighting on Iwo Jima. In April, she got underway for the United States.

Saugatuck arrived at Los Angeles on the 22nd; underwent repairs and alterations there at the Bethlehem Steel Co. docks; and headed west again in late June. On 12 July, she returned to Ulithi and, after a run to Leyte, commenced carrying fuel to the Ryukyus. On 4 August, she arrived off Okinawa. On the 10th, she moved into Buckner Bay and remained there until the day after the mid-August cessation of hostilities. She then commenced refueling operations in support of the minesweeping effort in the East China Sea, the occupation of Japan, and the repatriation of Allied and Japanese prisoners of war.

=== 1946–1974 ===
She was decommissioned on 29 March 1946, at San Francisco, California. She was struck from the Naval Register and transferred 9 October 1946 to the Maritime Commission for lay up in the National Defense Reserve Fleet, Suisun Bay, Benicia, California.

The Saugatuck was chartered by Pacific Tankers on 30 October 1947, but was reacquired by the Navy on 22 January 1948 and assigned to the Naval Transportation Service (NTS). Assigned to the Military Sea Transportation Service (MSTS) (later Military Sealift Command) as USNS Saugatuck (T-AOT-75) with a civilian crew on its establishment in October 1949, she remained in the Pacific until early 1950 when she extended her range to the Caribbean and Atlantic. With the outbreak of war in Korea, the ship became primarily engaged in shuttling fuel from the west coast and the Persian Gulf to Japan and, in December 1950, to Korea.

The spring and summer of 1952 saw her operating in the Caribbean and along the east coast on a schedule which, after a run to Seattle in early fall, was continued into the spring of 1953. She then resumed operations in the Pacific. In 1955, she commenced a varied schedule under which she has carried petroleum products from the world's major oil ports to United States Naval bases and depots in both hemispheres.

From June 1965 to March 1966 the USNS Saugatuck, was operated under MSTS contract by Keystone Shipping Company of Philadelphia, PA. During this period she continued to carry petroleum products from the US West Coast to United States Naval bases and depots in the Pacific, including Pearl Harbor, Hawaii, Midway, Wake and Kwajalein Islands, as well as, four (4) months of "floating storage" duty in Cham Ranh Bay and Da Nang, Vietnam from August through December 1965. On completing this duty she spent 2 weeks in the US Naval Shipyard Subic Bay, Philippines. Then continued west bound to Ras Tanura, Saudi Arabia, the Suez Canal, Greece, and Spain, before returning to the US East Coast ports of Delaware City and Providence, R.I.

=== Decommissioning and sale ===
Transferred to the Maritime Administration (MARAD), 5 November 1974, for lay up in the National Defense Reserve Fleet, James River, Fort Eustis, Virginia. Reclassified (along with her sisters) as T-AOT on 30 September 1978.

In July 2006 MARAD listed the Saugatuck under their disposal program. At that time, on 2 June 2006, Bay Bridge Enterprises had been awarded a contract for $549,999 to dispose of the Saugatuck. The removal date from the James River Reserve Fleet (JRRF) was listed as 18 July 2006 and final disposal was listed as in process.

== Awards ==
Saugatuck earned seven battle stars for World War II service.
