= MV Cape Knox =

Ship built in 1978

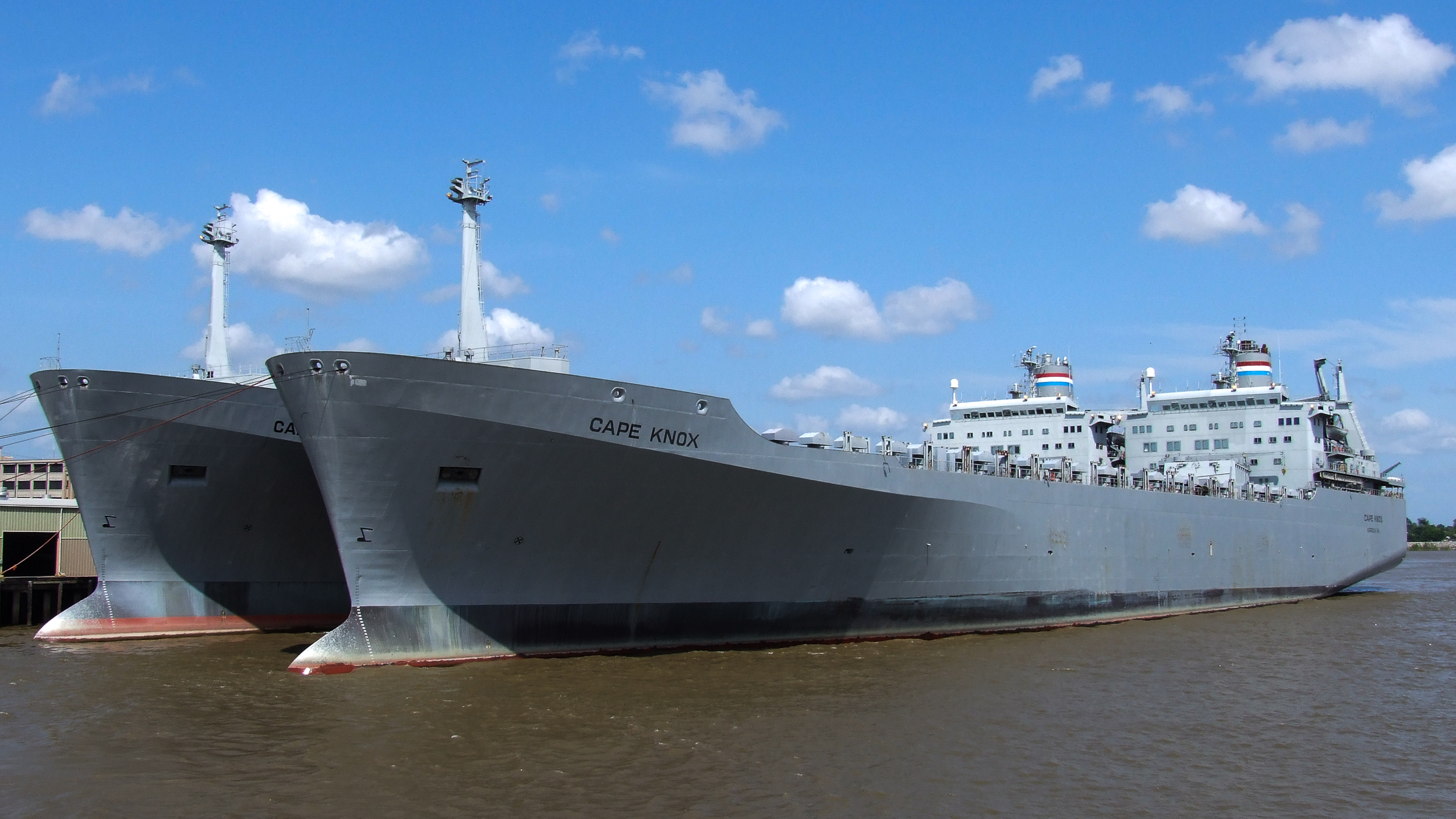
- MV Cape Knox

History

United States
- Name: MV Nedlloyd Rouen
- Builder: Nippon Kokan Kabushiki Kaisha
- Completed: 1979
- Renamed: MV Cape Knox
- Home port: New Orleans, Louisiana
- Identification: IMO number: 7715290; MMSI number: 367801000; Callsign: KAOP
- Status: Ready Reserve Fleet

General characteristics
- Type: Roll-on/Roll-off ship
- Displacement: 29,218 long tons (29,687 t)
- Length: 695 ft (212 m)
- Beam: 105 ft (32 m)
- Draft: 35 ft (11 m)
- Propulsion: one slow speed diesel engine, one shaft
- Speed: 16.6 knots (30.7 km/h; 19.1 mph)
- Range: not disclosed
- Complement: When idle 9 contract mariners/ active 25
- Time to activate: 5 days

MV Cape Knox (T-AKR-5082) was originally built and operated out of Rotterdam, the Netherlands by Nedlloyd Lines and was eventually sold to the United States Department of Transportation as a ready reserve vessel. Later the ship was transferred to the Ready Reserve Fleet. The ship is currently under the care of Keystone Shipping Company and is kept in ready reserve status. On 30 July 2025, it was announced by MARAD that the vessel will be allocated to Pacific Gulf Marine Inc., effective 18 August. The ship can be mobilized with five days of notice.
