= Keystone Shipping Company =

American transportation and logistics company

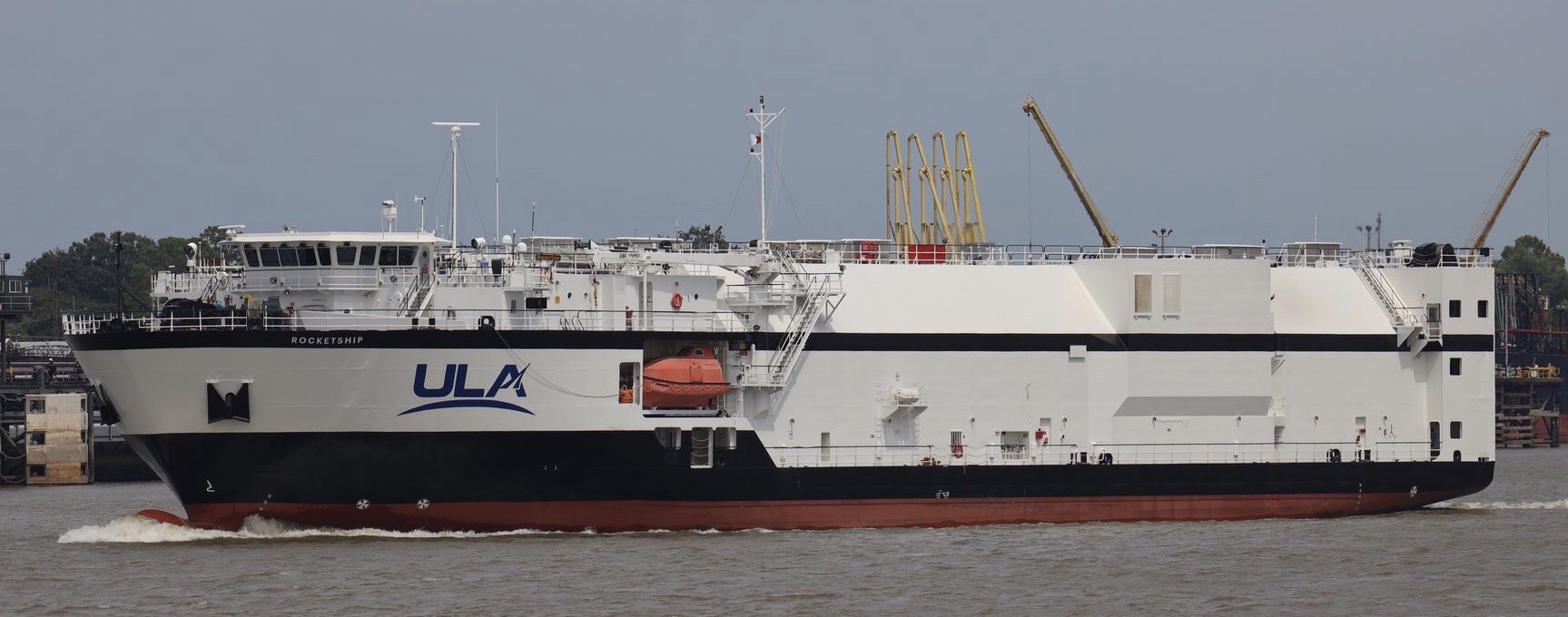
- Keystone Shipping Company's R/S RocketShip in 2019
- Type: Private
- Founded: 1909; 117 years ago
- Founder: Charles Kurz
- Headquarters: Bala Cynwyd, Pennsylvania, United States
- Key people: Donald Kurz, Donald Kurz Jr.
- Services: Transportation, logistics
- Website: www.keyship.com

Keystone Shipping Company is an American shipping and transportation company headquartered outside of Philadelphia, Pennsylvania. The company operates a fleet of ships for both dry bulk cargo and tankers.

Keystone Shipping Company has a fleet of over 20 ships. The fleet consists of: tankers, dry bulk ships, tugboats, tank barges, and roll-on/roll-off ships. Keystone Shipping Company tanker fleet transports crude oil and other petroleum products to both coasts in the United States.

== History ==
=== Foundation and early years ===
Keystone Shipping Company was founded by Charles Kurz in 1909. Before Keystone Shipping Company, Charles Kurz was a shipping agent, commodities trader, and ship owner.

Since World War I, the Keystone Shipping Company has been active in the worldwide support of the United States Armed Forces. Keystone Shipping Company is part of the Ready Reserve Fleet program. Keystone Shipping Company headquarters is in Bala Cynwyd, Pennsylvania.

=== World War II ===
Keystone Shipping Company was a major tanker operator during World War II, operating over 60 tankers, including Type T2 tankers. Keystone Shipping Company operated a fleet of tankers for the War Shipping Administration. Each Keystone Shipping Company tanker had a merchant crew of about 9 officers and 39 men. Charles Kurz became the head of the War Shipping Administration (WSA) during World War II, in addition to operating ships.

Some of the ships operated for World War II included:

- SS Santee
  - Liberty ships:
- Christopher L. Sholes
- Charles A. Wickliffe
- Andrew A. Humpreys
- Henry L. Ellsworth
- Thomas F. Cunningham
- David Holmes
- S.S. Seakay
  - T2 Tanker
- Oscar F. Barrett
- Oscar S. Straus
  - T2 Tanker
- Bennington
- Bunker Hill

== Key Lakes ==
Key Lakes, Inc. of Duluth, Minnesota is a subsidiary of Keystone Shipping Company operating on the Great Lakes with 20 ships. Key Lakes operated tankers, dry bulk ships, tugboats, tank barges, and roll-on/roll-off ships.

== Alaska Tanker Company ==
The Alaska Tanker Company was founded in 1999 by Keystone Shipping Company, OSG America Operating Company, and BP Oil Shipping Company. Overseas Shipholding Group, Inc. (NYSE: OSG) purchased all the shares of Alaska Tanker Company on March 12, 2020, and it is now a subsidiary of Overseas Shipholding Group, Inc. of Tampa. Alaska Tanker Company transports Alaskan crude oil with four 190,000-ton tankers. The company is headquartered in Beaverton, Oregon.

Ships:

- Alaska Explorer
- Alaska Frontier
- Alaska Legend
- Alaska Navigator

== Keystone Shipping Company ships ==
- MV Cape Kennedy (T-AKR-5083)
- SS Denebola (T-AKR-289)
- RS RocketShip
- SS Denebola (T-AKR-289)
- MV Cape Knox (T-AKR-5082)
- MV Cape Kennedy (T-AKR-5083)
- USNS Potomac (T-AO-181)
- MV Roger Blough
  - Some Past ships
- SS Chancellorsville T2
- SS Fredericksburg (1958) 1976–2004
- SS Murfreesboro T2
- SS Perryville T2
- SS Pueblo T2
- Birch Coulie
- Oakley Wood
- Henry C. Wallace
- New Zealand Victory
- David Holmes
- Alan Seeger
- Little Big Horn
- Fort Capot River
- MV Sea Isle City
- SS Bridgeton
- USS Saugatuck

== See also ==
- World War II United States Merchant Navy
