= Frederiksborg =

Frederiksborg may refer to:

- Frederiksborg Castle, in Hillerød, Denmark
- Frederiksborg, former name of Hillerød, a municipality to the north of Copenhagen, Denmark
- Frederiksborg County, former county on the island of Zealand in Denmark
- Fort Frederiksborg, Danish and later English fort built in 1661 in contemporary Ghana
- Frederiksborger, a kind of horse originating in Denmark
- Frederiksborg Glacier, on the east coast of the Greenland ice sheet

== See also ==
- Treaty of Frederiksborg, signed at Frederiksborg Castle in 1720
