= Fredericksburg, Pennsylvania =

Fredericksburg is the name of some places in the U.S. state of Pennsylvania:

- Fredericksburg, Blair County, Pennsylvania
- Fredericksburg, Crawford County, Pennsylvania
- Fredericksburg, Lebanon County, Pennsylvania
