= SS Fredericksburg (1958) =

Single-hulled T5-S-12b oil tanker

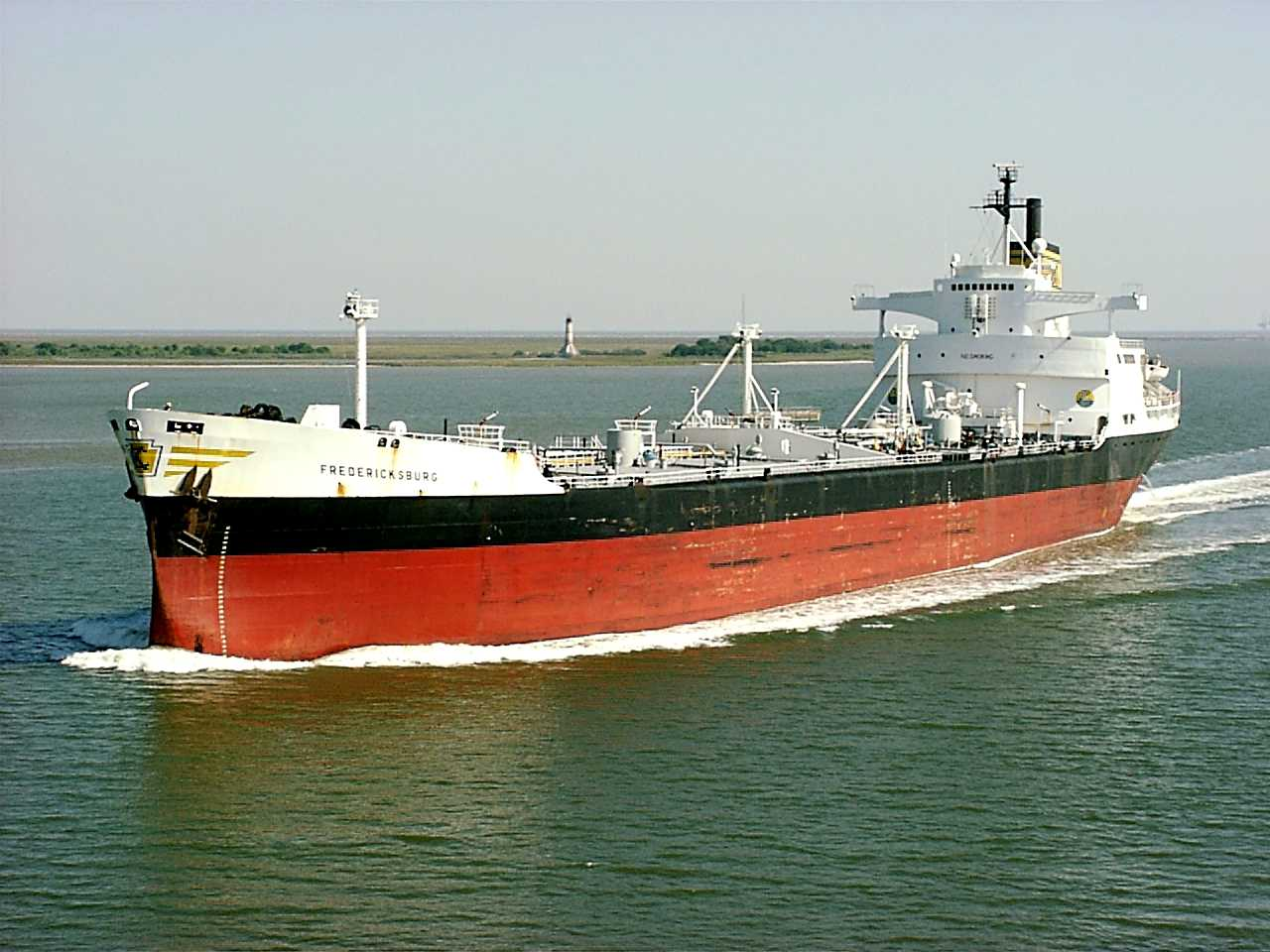
- SS Fredericksburg

History

United States
- Name: SS Fredericksburg
- Operator: Eagle Carriers, 1958–1976; Keystone Shipping Company, 1976–2004
- Builder: Ingalls Shipbuilding, Pascagoula, Mississippi
- Yard number: 1030
- Launched: 20 June 1958 as Eagle Courier
- Acquired: 10 October 1958
- Renamed: Fredericksburg, 1976
- Home port: Wilmington, Delaware
- Identification: IMO number: 5095713
- Fate: Scrapped, 16 April 2004

General characteristics
- Type: T5-S-12b Tanker
- Tonnage: 21,901 gross register tons (GRT); 40,006 long tons deadweight (DWT)
- Displacement: 26,500 long tons (26,925 t)
- Length: 651 ft 7 in (198.60 m) o/a
- Beam: 102 ft (31 m)
- Draft: 36 ft (11 m)
- Propulsion: Kawasaki Steam
- Speed: 17 knots (31 km/h; 20 mph)
- Notes: Single bottom, double sided hull

SS Fredericksburg was a single-hulled T5-S-12b oil tanker, originally named the Eagle Courier. The ship was built at Ingalls Shipbuilding in Pascagoula, Mississippi as hull number 1030 and delivered on 10 October 1958. The ship was scrapped in Chittagong, Bangladesh on 16 April 2004.

From delivery in 1958 until 1976, the ship was operated by Eagle Carriers. In 1976, she was bought by Keystone Shipping Company and renamed Fredericksburg. She continued to operate as a coastal tanker until 2004.

Fredericksburg was for some time the oldest tanker in the U.S. fleet, and its age showed. She was subject to a number of refittings and retrofittings, such as the 1983 forecastle overhaul. Also, towards the end of her career, she had a number of safety problems. For example, on 10 June 1999 when loaded, after experiencing a steering failure, she "grounded under power at mile forty-three in the Columbia River." Fortunately, she "came ashore in an area of the river characterized by soft mud banks and suffered no damage."

Some of Fredericksburg's problems were detailed in this 1 January 2003 article "Puget Sound's Rustbuckets:"

Fredericksburg has a safety rap sheet a mile long. The Coast Guard cited it for two deficiencies—improper boiler maintenance and damaged hull plates from an encounter with a Houston dock—in 2002 and investigated 26 minor accidents and oil discharges in the preceding nine years. That tally is much longer than the Coast Guard sheet on every younger tanker I examined.

Finally, although "its OPA90 phase-out date is 8-Dec-05, Keystone Tankships will scrap the tanker Fredericksburg rather than incur the cost of its next dry-docking survey, which is due this month (2/6)." In 2004, she was filled with grain in the port of Houston and sailed to Chittagong, Bangladesh where she was driven onto the beach and scrapped. The selling price was reportedly $425 per light displacement ton or 3.7 million U.S. dollars. Fredericksburg was joined by her sister ship Chilbar at the scrapyard later that year.
