= Fredericksburg, Mahoning County, Ohio =

Unincorporated community in Ohio, U.S.

Coordinates: 41°04′02″N 80°58′37″W

Fredericktown is an unincorporated community in Mahoning County, in the U.S. state of Ohio.

== History ==
In 1824, Frederick Byers (1768–1854) purchased 201 acres of land from Gideon Hoadley in Milton Township, Trumbull County, OH. (Milton Township became a part of Mahoning County in 1846.) This land is a part of the Connecticut Western Reserve, Township 2, Range 5, Lot 3 of the Southern Survey.

In 1830, with Byers and Dyer Fitch listed as Proprietors, Fredericktown was platted in September and recorded October 1, 1830. The town occupied 10 acres of Byers’ 201 acres and was located on the Mahoning River. The town is also often referred to as Fredericksburg and Frederick.

Fredericktown was laid out in 32 lots and most lots were .22 acres. From the 1830s until after the Civil War, Fredericktown thrived. It had at least 4 stores, one of them built as early as 1834, a hotel, house of entertainment, tavern, distillery and tannery. The Frederick post office existed from 1830 to 1867 in Frederick. It was then moved to Shilling's Mill, where it operated for four and a half years. In the 1838 tax records, 13 men are listed as owning 31 of the lots.

The Fredericktown school was built in (?). Milton Township had seven schools until the school code of 1914 was adopted, and then only 4 schools remained. The Fredericktown school was not one of them.

In September 1852, Samuel Jones sold land to John Patterson and John Carson in the amount of $70 in Lot 4 of the Southern Survey for the building of a Disciples Meeting House.

By 1913, it was decided that a dam would be built on the north end of the river in Milton Township, which led to the farms and houses in Fredericktown to be sold to the City of Youngstown as the dam was constructed and the river flooded and consumed Fredericktown

A post office called Frederick was established in 1834, and remained in operation until 1900. The original town site was inundated by the waters of the Lake Milton reservoir.
