= Kentucky Route 299 =

State highway in Kentucky, United States

Kentucky Route 299
- KY 299 highlighted in red

Route information
- Maintained by KYTC
- Length: 12.3 mi (19.8 km)

Major junctions
- South end: KY 94 northwest of Wiswell
- KY 121 in Stella; KY 80 north of Stella; KY 464 in Kirksey
- North end: KY 402 near Brewers

Location
- Country: United States
- State: Kentucky
- Counties: Calloway, Marshall

Highway system
- Kentucky State Highway System; Interstate; US; State; Parkways
| ← KY 297 | → KY 300 |

Kentucky Route 299 (KY 299) is a 12.3-mile-long (19.8 km) state highway in the U.S. state of Kentucky. The highway connects mostly rural areas of Calloway and Marshall counties.

== Route description ==
KY 299 begins at an intersection with KY 94 northwest of Wiswell, within Calloway County. It travels to the north and crosses over the West Fork Clarks River. It continues to the north and intersects KY 121. The two highways travel concurrently to the east-southeast. In Stella, they split, with KY 299 resuming it northward trek. Southwest of the Murray-Calloway County Airport, it intersects KY 80. The highway crosses over the West Fork Rockhouse Creek. It enters Kirksey, where it intersects KY 464 (Backusburg Road/Kirksey–Almo Road). After it crosses over the North Fork Duncan Creek, it enters Marshall County and meets its northern terminus, an intersection with KY 402 (Brewers Highway).

== Major intersections ==
| County | Location | mi | km | Destinations | Notes |
|---|---|---|---|---|---|
| Calloway | | 0.0 | 0.0 | KY 94 | Southern terminus |
| Calloway | | 3.1 | 5.0 | KY 121 west | Southern end of KY 121 concurrency |
| Calloway | Stella | 3.6 | 5.8 | KY 121 east | Northern end of KY 121 concurrency |
| Calloway | | 4.5 | 7.2 | KY 80 – Mayfield, Murray | |
| Calloway | Kirksey | 7.7 | 12.4 | KY 464 (Backusburg Road/Kirksey–Almo Road) | |
| Marshall | | 12.3 | 19.8 | KY 402 (Brewers Highway) | Northern terminus |
1.000 mi = 1.609 km; 1.000 km = 0.621 mi: Concurrency terminus
