= Larry Elkins (politician) =

American politician

Member of the Kentucky House of Representatives from the 5th district
- In office January 1, 2019 – January 1, 2021
- Preceded by: Kenny Imes
- Succeeded by: Mary Beth Imes

Judge/Executive of Calloway County
- In office January 4, 1999 – September 30, 2018
- Succeeded by: Kenny Imes

Personal details
- Born: April 4, 1948 (age 78) Murray, Kentucky, U.S.
- Party: Republican (since 2015)
- Other political affiliations: Independent (2013–2015); Democratic (before 2013)
- Spouse: Janie
- Children: 3
- Education: Murray State University

Robert Larry Elkins (born April 4, 1948) is an American politician who served in the Kentucky House of Representatives from 2019 to 2021 and as Judge/Executive of Calloway County from 1999 to 2018.

== Early life ==
Elkins was born in Murray, Kentucky. He served in the United States Army. He holds a degree from Murray State University.

== Political career ==
First elected Judge/Executive in 1998 as a member of the Democratic Party, he became an independent in May 2013. He switched parties again to the Republican party in December 2015. He resigned as Judge/Executive in September 2018 in order to run for the Kentucky House of Representatives. Elkins was elected to represent the 5th district in 2018. He did not seek reelection in 2020.

=== Electoral record ===
2018 general election: Kentucky House of Representatives, District 5
Party	Candidate	Votes	%
Republican	Larry Elkins	9,326	58.1%
Democratic	David Ramey	6,739	41.9%
