= 1989 Kentucky elections =

A general election was held in the U.S. state of Kentucky on November 7, 1989. The primary election for all offices was held on May 23, 1989.

== State offices ==
=== Judicial elections ===
All judges of the Kentucky District Courts were elected in non-partisan elections to four-year terms.

== Local offices ==
=== County officers ===
All county officials were elected in partisan elections to four-year terms. The offices include the County Judge/Executive, the Fiscal Court (Magistrates and/or Commissioners), County Clerk, County Attorney, Jailer, Coroner, Surveyor, Property Value Administrator, Constables, and Sheriff.

=== Mayors ===
Mayors in Kentucky are elected to four-year terms. Prior to 1992, cities held their elections in odd-numbered years, in either the year preceding or following a presidential election.

=== City councils ===
Each incorporated city elected its council members to a two-year term.

== See also ==
- Elections in Kentucky
- Politics of Kentucky
- Political party strength in Kentucky
