= Kentucky Route 402 =

State highway in Kentucky, United States

Kentucky Route 402
- KY 402 highlighted in red

Route information
- Maintained by KYTC
- Length: 16.859 mi (27.132 km)

Major junctions
- West end: KY 58 northwest of Brewers
- KY 299 north of Kirksey; US 641 in Hardin; KY 905 in Hardin; KY 962 east of Hardin
- East end: US 68 west of Aurora

Location
- Country: United States
- State: Kentucky
- Counties: Marshall

Highway system
- Kentucky State Highway System; Interstate; US; State; Parkways
← KY 401	→ KY 403

Kentucky Route 402 (KY 402) is a 16.859-mile-long (27.132 km) state highway in the U.S. state of Kentucky. The highway connects Aurora and Hardin to mostly rural areas of southern Marshall County.

== Route description ==
KY 402 begins at an intersection with KY 58 (Brewers Highway / Mayfield Highway) northwest of Brewers, within the southwestern part of Marshall County. It travels to the southeast and travels through Brewers, where it intersects the northern terminus of KY 1836 (Duncan Creek Road). The highway curves to the east-southeast and intersects the southern terminus of KY 1522 (Soldier Creek Road). It curves to the east-northeast and intersects the northern terminus of KY 299 (Kirksey Highway) and then the southern terminus of KY 2606 (Jackson School Road) in rapid succession. It begins heading in a due east direction and intersects the southern terminus of KY 1311 (Slickback Road). KY 402 crosses over the South Fork Soldier Creek and intersects the southern terminus of KY 1949 (Wadesboro Road South). It crosses over Martins Creek and enters Hardin. It curves to the east-northeast and intersects U.S. Route 641 (US 641). The highway passes Pace Cemetery and intersects KY 1824 (Murray Highway). It has a second crossing of Martins Creek and intersects the northern terminus of KY 905 (Commerce Street). It crosses over Clarks River and curves to the southeast. After intersecting the southern terminus of KY 962 (Old Olive Road), it curves to the east-northeast. It intersects the southern terminus of KY 1364 (Olive Creek Road). It crosses over Jonathan Creek. The highway crosses over Clear Creek and heads to the east-northeast. A short distance later, it meets its eastern terminus, an intersection with US 68.

== History ==
=== Previous locations of KY 402 ===
Between August 1985 and February 1990, KY 402 was a designation of the Mountain Parkway in northeastern Kentucky, which is now designated in one section as KY 9000 and in another section as KY 9009. Until November 1982, KY 402 was a designation of the road from Flemingsburg to Beechburg; this is now part of KY 3301.

=== Current incarnation of KY 402 ===
From 1954 until July 18, 2002, the current alignment of KY 402 was originally signed as a part of KY 80; KY 80 was rerouted onto its current designation onto a new four-lane alignment through Calloway County; the old KY 80 alignment was redesignated as KY 402 during the 2002-2003 fiscal year. From 1929 until 1954, this highway was signed as KY 98.

== Major intersections ==
The entire route is in Marshall County.

Location	mi	km	Destinations	Notes
	0.000	0.000	KY 58 (Brewers Highway / Mayfield Highway)	Western terminus
Brewers	0.906	1.458	KY 1836 south (Duncan Creek Road)	Northern terminus of KY 1836
	1.416	2.279	KY 1522 north (Soldier Creek Road)	Southern terminus of KY 1522
	3.412	5.491	KY 299 south (Kirksey Highway)	Northern terminus of KY 299
	3.472	5.588	KY 2606 north (Jackson School Road)	Southern terminus of KY 2606
	4.847	7.800	KY 1311 north (Slickback Road)	Southern terminus of KY 1311
	6.123	9.854	KY 1949 north (Wadesboro Road South)	Southern terminus of KY 1949
Hardin	8.076	12.997	US 641 – Murray, Benton	
Hardin	8.472	13.634	KY 1824 (Murray Highway)	
Hardin	8.929	14.370	KY 905 south (Commerce Street)	Northern terminus of KY 905
	10.167	16.362	KY 962 north (Old Olive Road)	Southern terminus of KY 962
	11.841	19.056	KY 1364 north (Olive Creek Road)	Southern terminus of KY 1364
	16.859	27.132	US 68 to KY 80 – Hopkinsville	Eastern terminus
1.000 mi = 1.609 km; 1.000 km = 0.621 mi
