= Kentucky's 5th House of Representatives district =

American legislative district

Kentucky's 5th State House of Representatives district
Representative
| Mary Beth Imes; R–Murray |
since January 1, 2021
- Registration: 45.7% Republican; 42.2% Democratic; 11.5% No party preference
- Demographics: 88.6% White; 3.3% Black; 3.3% Hispanic; 1.4% Asian; 0.2% Native American; 0.3% Hawaiian/Pacific Islander; 0.5% Other; 2.4% Multiracial
- Population (2023): 43,983
- Registered voters (2025): 36,687

Kentucky's 5th House of Representatives district is one of 100 districts in the Kentucky House of Representatives. Located in the far west of the state, it comprises the counties of Calloway and part of Trigg. It has been represented by Mary Beth Imes (R–Murray) since 2021. As of 2023, the district had a population of 43,983.

== Voter registration ==
On January 1, 2025, the district had 36,687 registered voters, who were registered with the following parties.

| Party | Registration | |
| Party | Voters | % |
|---|---|---|
| Republican | 16,767 | 45.70 |
| Democratic | 15,469 | 42.16 |
| Independent | 1,861 | 5.07 |
| Libertarian | 195 | 0.53 |
| Green | 28 | 0.08 |
| Constitution | 19 | 0.05 |
| Socialist Workers | 3 | 0.01 |
| Reform | 1 | 0.00 |
| "Other" | 2,344 | 6.39 |
| Total | 36,687 | 100.00 |
Source: Kentucky State Board of Elections

== List of members representing the district ==
| Member | Party | Years | Electoral history | District location |
|---|---|---|---|---|
| Kenny Imes (Murray) | Democratic | January 1, 1972 – February 13, 1979 | Elected in 1971. Reelected in 1973. Reelected in 1975. Reelected in 1977. Resigned to become commissioner of the Kentucky Bureau of Natural Resources. | 1972–1974; Calloway and Trigg Counties. |
| Kenny Imes (Murray) | Democratic | January 1, 1972 – February 13, 1979 | Elected in 1971. Reelected in 1973. Reelected in 1975. Reelected in 1977. Resigned to become commissioner of the Kentucky Bureau of Natural Resources. | 1974–1985; Calloway (part) and Trigg (part) Counties. |
| Freed Curd (Murray) | Democratic | January 1, 1980 – January 1, 1999 | Elected in 1979. Reelected in 1981. Reelected in 1984. Reelected in 1986. Reelected in 1988. Reelected in 1990. Reelected in 1992. Reelected in 1994. Reelected in 1996. Retired to run for mayor of Murray. | 1974–1985; Calloway (part) and Trigg (part) Counties. |
| Freed Curd (Murray) | Democratic | January 1, 1980 – January 1, 1999 | Elected in 1979. Reelected in 1981. Reelected in 1984. Reelected in 1986. Reelected in 1988. Reelected in 1990. Reelected in 1992. Reelected in 1994. Reelected in 1996. Retired to run for mayor of Murray. | 1985–1993; Calloway and Trigg (part) Counties. |
| Freed Curd (Murray) | Democratic | January 1, 1980 – January 1, 1999 | Elected in 1979. Reelected in 1981. Reelected in 1984. Reelected in 1986. Reelected in 1988. Reelected in 1990. Reelected in 1992. Reelected in 1994. Reelected in 1996. Retired to run for mayor of Murray. | 1993–1997; Calloway and Trigg (part) Counties. |
| Freed Curd (Murray) | Democratic | January 1, 1980 – January 1, 1999 | Elected in 1979. Reelected in 1981. Reelected in 1984. Reelected in 1986. Reelected in 1988. Reelected in 1990. Reelected in 1992. Reelected in 1994. Reelected in 1996. Retired to run for mayor of Murray. | 1997–2003 |
| Buddy Buckingham (Murray) | Democratic | January 1, 1999 – January 1, 2005 | Elected in 1998. Reelected in 2000. Reelected in 2002. Lost reelection. | 1997–2003 |
| Buddy Buckingham (Murray) | Democratic | January 1, 1999 – January 1, 2005 | Elected in 1998. Reelected in 2000. Reelected in 2002. Lost reelection. | 2003–2015 |
| Melvin Henley (Murray) | Republican | January 1, 2005 – September 14, 2007 | Elected in 2004. Reelected in 2006. Reelected in 2008. Reelected in 2010. Retired. | 2003–2015 |
| Melvin Henley (Murray) | Democratic | September 14, 2007 – January 1, 2013 | Elected in 2004. Reelected in 2006. Reelected in 2008. Reelected in 2010. Retired. | 2003–2015 |
| Kenny Imes (Murray) | Republican | January 1, 2013 – October 1, 2018 | Elected in 2012. Reelected in 2014. Reelected in 2016. Resigned to become Judge/Executive of Calloway County. | 2003–2015 |
| Kenny Imes (Murray) | Republican | January 1, 2013 – October 1, 2018 | Elected in 2012. Reelected in 2014. Reelected in 2016. Resigned to become Judge/Executive of Calloway County. | 2015–2023 |
| Larry Elkins (Murray) | Republican | January 1, 2019 – January 1, 2021 | Elected in 2018. Retired. | 2015–2023 |
| Mary Beth Imes (Murray) | Republican | January 1, 2021 – present | Elected in 2020. Reelected in 2022. Reelected in 2024. Reelected in 2026. | 2015–2023 |
| Mary Beth Imes (Murray) | Republican | January 1, 2021 – present | Elected in 2020. Reelected in 2022. Reelected in 2024. Reelected in 2026. | 2023–present |
