= Faxon =

Faxon may refer to:

== Places ==
- Faxon, Kentucky
- Faxon, Oklahoma
- Faxon, Pennsylvania

== People ==
=== Given name ===
- Faxon Atherton (1815–1877), American businessman, trader and landowner

=== Surname ===
- Faxons of Massachusetts, U.S.:

- Lucia H. Faxon Additon (1847–1919), social reformer
- Charles Edward Faxon (1846–1918), botanist
- John Lyman Faxon (1851–1918), architect
- Walter Faxon (1848–1920), ornithologist, carcinologist, and taxonomist
- William Otis Faxon (1853–1942), politician

- Brad Faxon (born 1961), American professional golfer
- Frederick Winthrop Faxon (1866–1936), American bibliographer and publisher
- Jack Faxon (1936–2020), American educator and politician
- Nancy Plummer Faxon (1914–2005), American singer, music educator and organist
- Nat Faxon (born 1975), American actor

== See also ==
- Faxonella, a genus of crayfish
- Faxonius, a genus of crayfish
- Faxonia, a genus of flowering plants in the daisy family
