= Cherry Corner, Kentucky =

Unincorporated community in Kentucky, United States

Cherry Corner
- Unincorporated community
- Location within the state of Kentucky Cherry Corner (the United States)
- Coordinates: 36°34′50″N 88°13′27″W
- Country: United States
- State: Kentucky
- County: Calloway
- Elevation: 538 ft (164 m)
- Time zone: UTC-6 (Central (CST))
  - Summer (DST): UTC-5 (CST)
- GNIS feature ID: 2743615

Cherry Corner was an unincorporated community in Calloway County, Kentucky, United States.
