= Bill Furgerson =

American football and track coach (1929–2006)

Biographical details
- Born: June 14, 1929; Dexter, Kentucky, U.S.
- Died: September 21, 2006 (aged 77); Murray, Kentucky, U.S.

Playing career

Football
- 1947–1950: Murray State

Coaching career (HC unless noted)

Football
- 1951–1953: Lafayette HS (KY) (assistant)
- 1954: Murray State (GA)
- 1955: Murphysboro HS (IL) (assistant)
- 1956–1959: Murray State (assistant)
- 1967–1977: Murray State

Track
- 1956–1965: Murray State

Head coaching record
- Overall: 60–49–4 (college football)

Accomplishments and honors

Awards
- OVC Coach of the Year (1968)

William Wesley Furgerson (June 14, 1929 – September 21, 2006) was an American football and track and field coach. He served as the head football coach at Murray State University in Murray, Kentucky from 1967 to 1977, compiling a record of 60–49–4. He served as the men's track coach at Murray State from 1956 to 1965.

== Head coaching record ==
=== College football ===
Year	Team	Overall	Conference	Standing	Bowl/playoffs
Murray State Racers (Ohio Valley Conference) (1967–1977)
1967	Murray State	4–6	2–5	T–7th	
1968	Murray State	7–2–1	5–2	T–2nd	
1969	Murray State	5–4–1	2–4–1	6th	
1970	Murray State	4–6	1–6	8th	
1971	Murray State	5–4–1	3–3–1	5th	
1972	Murray State	4–6	2–5	T–6th	
1973	Murray State	7–3	5–2	2nd	
1974	Murray State	9–2	5–2	2nd	
1975	Murray State	4–5–1	3–3–1	4th	
1976	Murray State	5–6	4–3	3rd	
1977	Murray State	6–5	4–3	T–3rd	
Murray State:		60–49–4	36–38–3		
Total:		60–49–4			
