= Kenny Imes =

American politician

Judge/Executive of Calloway County
- Incumbent
- Assumed office October 1, 2018
- Preceded by: Larry Elkins

Member of the Kentucky House of Representatives from the 5th district
- In office January 1, 2013 – October 1, 2018
- Preceded by: Melvin Henley
- Succeeded by: Larry Elkins
- In office January 1, 1972 – February 13, 1979
- Preceded by: E. Guy Lovins
- Succeeded by: Freed Curd

Personal details
- Born: February 13, 1947 (age 79)
- Party: Republican; Democratic (1972–1980)
- Spouse: Mary Beth Imes
- Education: Murray State University

Kenneth Churchill Imes (born February 13, 1947) is a U.S. politician who has served as the Judge/Executive of Calloway County since October 2018; he was appointed to the position by governor Matt Bevin and won re-election in 2018 and 2022. He previously served in the Kentucky House of Representatives from 1972 to 1979 and 2013 to 2018. He was elected in 2012 after incumbent Democratic representative Melvin Henley retired. Imes resigned from the Kentucky House in 2018 to become Judge/Executive. His wife Mary Beth Imes currently represents his former seat in the house.

== Education ==
Imes attended Murray State University.

== Elections ==
- Kentucky State House of Representatives
  - When District 5 Democratic Representative Melvin Henley retired and left the seat open, Imes was unopposed for the May 22, 2012 Republican Primary and won the November 6, 2012 General election with 9,639 votes (56.0%) against Democratic nominee Hal Kemp, who had run for the seat in 2006.
- Calloway County Judge/Executive
  - In 2018, Imes won the Republican primary with 82.5% of the vote. He was appointed to the role in October 2018, and was elected for a full term in November with 53.0% of the vote.
  - In 2022, Imes won the Republican primary with 78.6% of the vote and ran unopposed in the general election.
  - In 2026, Imes was defeated in the Republican primary by Calloway County magistrate Paul Rister. Imes received 38.5% of the vote, while Rister received 61.5% of the vote.
