= Penny, Calloway County, Kentucky =

Unincorporated community in Kentucky, United States

Penny, Kentucky
- Unincorporated community
- Location within Kentucky
- Coordinates: 36°38′49″N 88°21′38″W
- Country: United States
- State: Kentucky
- County: Calloway
- Elevation: 558 ft (170 m)
- Time zone: UTC-6 (Central (CST))
  - Summer (DST): UTC-5 (CDT)
- Area codes: 270 & 364
- GNIS feature ID: 508801

Penny is an unincorporated community in Calloway County, Kentucky, United States.
