= Buddy Buckingham =

American politician

Member of the Kentucky House of Representatives from the 5th district
- In office January 1, 1999 – January 1, 2005
- Preceded by: Freed Curd
- Succeeded by: Melvin Henley

Personal details
- Born: October 12, 1933
- Died: June 13, 2017 (aged 83)
- Party: Democratic
- Children: David

Robert "Buddy" Buckingham (October 12, 1933 – June 13, 2017) was an American politician from Kentucky who was a member of the Kentucky House of Representatives from 1999 to 2005. Buckingham was first elected in 1998 after incumbent Freed Curd retired to run for mayor of Murray. He lost reelection in 2004, being defeated by Republican Melvin Henley. Henley would later switch to the Democratic party in September 2007.

Buckingham died in June 2017 at age 83.
