= Lucia Faxon Additon =

American writer and temperance activist (1847–1919)

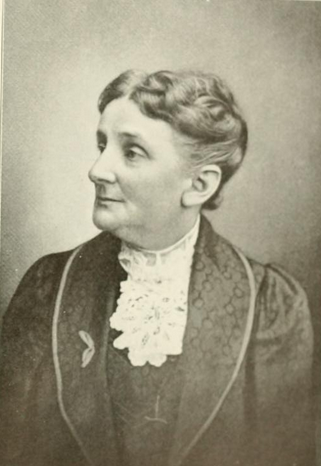
- Born: Lucia Hatch Faxon; September 28, 1847; Abington, Massachusetts, U.S.
- Died: January 4, 1919 (aged 71); Portland, Oregon, U.S.
- Occupations: writer; teacher; social reformer
- Organization: Woman's Christian Temperance Union
- Notable work: Twenty eventful years of the Oregon Woman's Christian temperance union, 1880-1900
- Political party: Prohibition Party
- Movement: temperance
- Spouse: Otis Richmond Additon (m. 1867; died 1914)
- Children: 1
- Family: Faxon

Signature
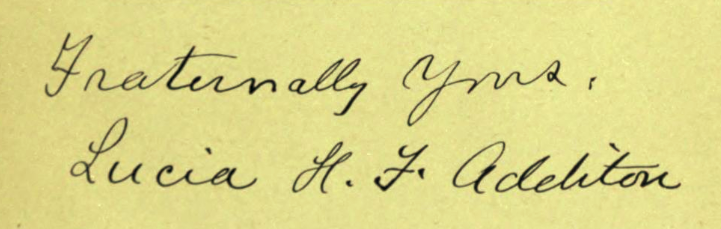

Lucia Faxon Additon (née Lucia Hatch Faxon; September 28, 1847 – January 4, 1919) was an American writer, music teacher, and Woman's Christian Temperance Union (WCTU) official. In addition to being a pioneer in WCTU work on the Pacific Coast, she was known as a leader in philanthropic, education, and religious work. Additon was also a clubwoman, being the founder and president of the Woman's Press Club of Oregon, and State chair of Industrial Relations in the Oregon Federation of Woman's Clubs.

== Early life and education ==
Lucia Hatch Faxon was born in Abington, Massachusetts, September 28, 1847. Her parents were Lucius and Harriet (Jones) Faxon, of the old Faxon family. She had nine siblings.

Following her common school education, she entered the academy in Abington, and after her graduation, devoted herself to the study of music.

== Career ==
For many years, she was a professional teacher of music.

In Abington, on June 5, 1867, she married Otis Richmond Additon (1843-1914). In 1880, the couple and their son, Alton Sydney Abington (1871-1914) removed to Corvallis, Oregon where Mr. Additon was in the mercantile business. Mrs. Additon was a young mother and a busy music teacher. "I felt I must do something," was her later explanation of her temperance activism. "There were seven saloons and a brewery in town, and I had a boy to raise."

At the 14th Annual Meeting of the WCTU, in Nashville, Tennessee, November 1887, Additon's writing of verse and music were noted. At the 25th Annual Meeting of the WCTU, held in Saint Paul, Minnesota, November 1898, Additon reported on her Oregon state work, which included 30 lectures, 8 sermons, 6 parlor meeting, 13 woman's meetings, 18 addresses, 3 county conventions, 22 personal visits, and 3 medal presentations. She also indicated that she had organized the first WCTU among African Americans on the Pacific Coast, as far as she was informed; it was called the Lucy Thurman WCTU of Oregon.

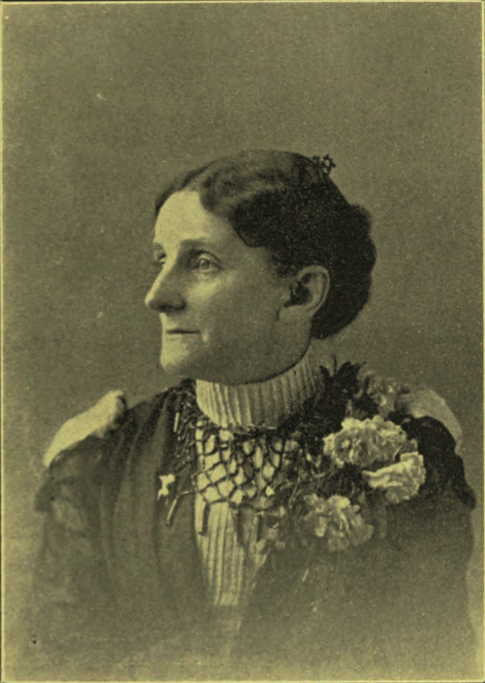
(1904)

The World's Temperance Centennial Congress was held in Saratoga Springs, New York, June 1908. Its Woman's Congress, or Round Table, held each afternoon, was under Additon's leadership. Her address on labor conditions, and their relation to the temperance reform, was heard by a large audience.

By 1912, Additon was living in the Lents neighborhood of Portland, Oregon, where Mr. Additon engaged in the real estate business and where the couple held considerable property. For four years, she served as president of the Oregon WCTU, and it was during this time that she established the State WCTU paper. She subsequently became a National WCTU organizer, then associate superintendent of the department of Temperance and Labor, later serving as National Superintendent. She made an exhaustive study of the labor problem as correlated with the temperance problem, and her writing on this subject were recognized as valuable educational literature.

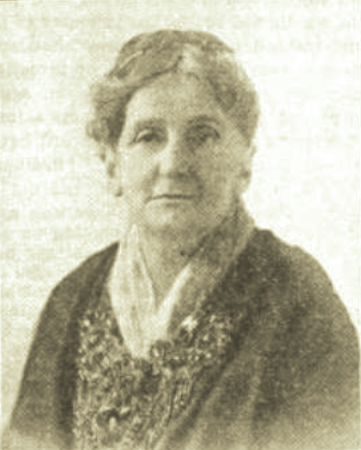
(1919)

Additon was the founder and for ten years president of the Woman's Press Club of Oregon. She also served as State chair of Industrial Relations in the Oregon Federation of Woman's Clubs, and was at the head of the social science department of the Woman's Club of Portland. She was named as one of the woman delegates to represent the state at the Astoria, Oregon Centennial in 1911.

She was, in 1914, the Prohibition Party candidate for state representative from Multnomah County. During her campaign, she promoted herself as, for 25 years, having made a special study of economic and labor issues; she specialized in social welfare work, lecturing along the lines of social science and reform; and she favored prison reform. Her slogans for the campaign were, "Common sense in legislation" and "Efficiency in administration". In 1916, she made a six month trip to New York City and Boston for research into social conditions in connection with the Oregon state WCTU and the Federation of Women's Clubs.

Twenty eventful years of the Oregon Woman's Christian temperance union, 1880-1900.

Besides contributing frequently to temperance and other periodicals, she was the author of several books on general subjects, as well as a history of the 20 eventful years of WCTU in Oregon.

== Personal life ==
In religion, she was a life-long member of the Swedenborgian church.

Lucia Hatch Faxon Additon died of pneumonia at the East Side Sanitarium, in Portland, Oregon, January 4, 1919.

== Selected works ==
- Twenty eventful years of the Oregon Woman's Christian temperance union, 1880-1900. Statistical, historical and biographical. Portraits of prominent pioneer workers (1904)
- The ministry of flowers
- For the farm ... and fireside

=== Articles ===
- "The Woman's Christian Temperance Union" (1905)
- "Industrial and Social Conditions" (1916)
