= Freed Curd =

American politician

Mayor of Murray
- In office January 1999 – January 2003

Member of the Kentucky House of Representatives from the 5th district
- In office January 1, 1980 – January 1, 1999
- Preceded by: Kenny Imes
- Succeeded by: Buddy Buckingham

Personal details
- Born: March 18, 1933
- Died: September 2, 2007 (aged 74)
- Party: Democratic

Freed Mason Curd (March 18, 1933 – September 2, 2007) was an American politician from Kentucky who was a member of the Kentucky House of Representatives from 1980 to 1999. Curd was first elected in 1979, succeeding incumbent representative Kenny Imes. He did not seek reelection in 1998, instead running for mayor of Murray, where he served one term.

Curd died in 2007 at age 74.
