= Hardin, Kentucky =

- City
- Location in Marshall County, Kentucky
- Coordinates: 36°45′55″N 88°18′08″W
- Country: United States
- State: Kentucky
- County: Marshall
- Named for: Hardin D. Irvan (local landowner)

Area
  - Total: 0.70 sq mi (1.82 km^{2})
  - Land: 0.70 sq mi (1.81 km^{2})
  - Water: 0 sq mi (0.00 km^{2})
- Elevation: 420 ft (130 m)

Population (2020)
  - Total: 580
  - Density: 828/sq mi (319.6/km^{2})
- Time zone: UTC-6 (Central (CST))
  - Summer (DST): UTC-5 (CDT)
- ZIP code: 42048
- Area codes: 270 & 364
- FIPS code: 21-34534
- GNIS feature ID: 2403798
- Website: https://cityofhardinky.com/

Hardin is a home rule-class city in Marshall County, Kentucky, United States. The population was 580 at the 2020 census.

== History ==
The Paducah, Tennessee and Alabama Railroad reached the area in 1890. A community grew up around the depot, erected on land purchased from local landowner Hardin D. Irvan. The post office was established on October 31, 1891, but the town was formally incorporated as a city on March 25, 1952.

== Geography ==
Hardin is located in southern Marshall County at 36°45′47″N 88°18′0″W (36.763063, -88.300105). Kentucky Route 402 (Aurora Highway) passes through the north side of the city, while U.S. Route 641 crosses the western part. US 641 leads north 7 miles (11 km) to Benton, the county seat, and south 11 miles (18 km) to Murray. KY 402 leads 9 miles (14 km) to Aurora and west the same distance to Kentucky Route 58 near Brewers.

According to the United States Census Bureau, Hardin has a total area of 0.7 square miles (1.8 km^{2}), of which 0.002 square miles (0.005 km^{2}), or 0.28%, are water. The city is on the west side of the valley of the Clarks River, a north-flowing tributary of the Tennessee River.

== Demographics ==
Historical population
Census	Pop.	Note	%±
1900	240		—
1910	366		52.5%
1920	436		19.1%
1930	348		−20.2%
1940	414		19.0%
1950	324		−21.7%
1960	458		41.4%
1970	522		14.0%
1980	545		4.4%
1990	595		9.2%
2000	564		−5.2%
2010	615		9.0%
2020	580		−5.7%
U.S. Decennial Census

As of the 2000 U.S. census, there were 564 people, 257 households, and 155 families residing in the city. The population density was 954.8 inhabitants per square mile (368.7/km^{2}). There were 282 housing units at an average density of 477.4 per square mile (184.3/km^{2}). The racial makeup of the city was 99.29% White, 0.53% Native American, and 0.18% from two or more races. Hispanic or Latino of any race were 0.35% of the population.

There were 257 households, out of which 30.0% had children under the age of 18 living with them, 42.4% were married couples living together, 15.2% had a female householder with no husband present, and 39.3% were non-families. 35.4% of all households were made up of individuals, and 16.3% had someone living alone who was 65 years of age or older. The average household size was 2.19 and the average family size was 2.81.

In the city, the population was spread out, with 24.3% under the age of 18, 10.1% from 18 to 24, 26.6% from 25 to 44, 22.3% from 45 to 64, and 16.7% who were 65 years of age or older. The median age was 37 years. For every 100 females, there were 81.4 males. For every 100 females age 18 and over, there were 80.9 males.

The median income for a household in the city was $20,833, and the median income for a family was $25,893. Males had a median income of $24,063 versus $20,694 for females. The per capita income for the city was $11,690. About 20.1% of families and 24.6% of the population were below the poverty line, including 37.7% of those under age 18 and 17.0% of those age 65 or over.

== Education ==
Hardin has a lending library, a branch of the Marshall County Public Library.
