= Mary Beth Imes =

American politician (born 1948)

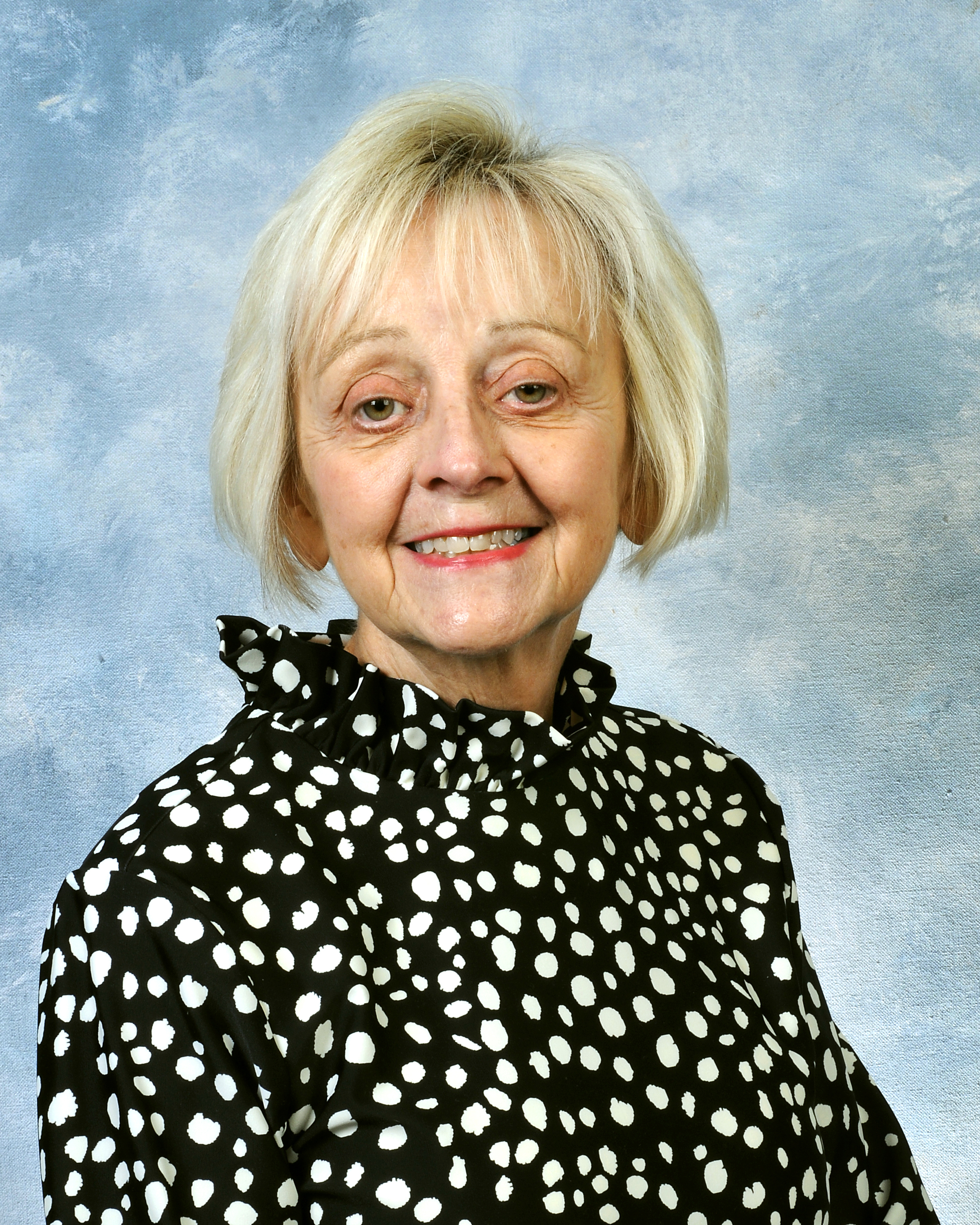
- Official portrait, 2020

Member of the Kentucky House of Representatives from the 5th district
- Incumbent
- Assumed office January 1, 2021
- Preceded by: Larry Elkins

Personal details
- Born: Calloway County, Kentucky; March 31, 1948 (age 78)
- Party: Republican
- Spouse: Kenny Imes
- Committees: Transportation (Vice Chair); Elections, Constitutional Amendments, and Intergovernmental Affairs; Local Government; State Government

Mary Beth Imes (born March 31, 1948) is an American politician who has served as a Republican member of the Kentucky House of Representatives since January 2021. She represents Kentucky's 5th House district, which includes Calloway County and part of Trigg County.

== Personal life ==
Imes graduated from Calloway County High School. She has three children with her husband, Kenny Imes. Kenny previously represented the 5th House district from 2013 to 2018. Prior to holding office, she was the director of Imes Funeral Home and Crematory.

== Elections ==
- 2020 Imes was unopposed in the 2020 Republican primary and won the 2020 Kentucky House of Representatives election, with 14,855 votes (68.8%) against Democratic candidate Shannon Davis-Roberts.
- 2022 Imes was unopposed in both the 2022 Republican primary and 2022 Kentucky House of Representatives election, winning with 11,181 votes.
- 2024 Imes was unopposed in the 2024 republican primary and won the 2024 Kentucky House of Representatives election with 2,627 votes (75.6%) against Democratic candidate Lauren Hines.
