= Coldwater, Kentucky =

Unincorporated community in Kentucky, United States

- Unincorporated community
- Location within the state of Kentucky Coldwater (the United States)
- Coordinates: 36°39′3″N 88°27′19″W
- Country: United States
- State: Kentucky
- County: Calloway
- Elevation: 545 ft (166 m)
- Time zone: UTC-6 (Central (CST))
  - Summer (DST): UTC-5 (CST)
- GNIS feature ID: 489801

Coldwater is an unincorporated community in Calloway County, Kentucky, United States. The original site of the community was developed by Byrd Ezell in the early 1840s. The post office was established on December 9, 1856, and was active until 1907.
