= Melvin Henley =

American politician

Member of the Kentucky House of Representatives from the 5th district
- In office January 1, 2005 – January 1, 2013
- Preceded by: Buddy Buckingham
- Succeeded by: Kenny Imes

Personal details
- Born: August 25, 1935 (age 90) Hickory Valley, Tennessee
- Party: Democratic (2007–present)
- Other political affiliations: Republican (1997–2007); Democratic (before 1997)

Melvin Brent Henley (born August 25, 1935) is an American politician who served in the Kentucky House of Representatives from the 5th district from 2005 to 2013. He is a graduate of Murray State University where he received a Bachelor of Science degree in chemistry. Henley was first elected to the house in 2004, defeating Democratic incumbent Buddy Buckingham. Henley subsequently changed his party affiliation to the Democratic party on September 14, 2007. He retired from the house in 2012 and was succeeded by Republican Kenny Imes.
