= Midway, Calloway County, Kentucky =

Unincorporated community in Kentucky, United States

Midway, Kentucky
- Unincorporated community
- Location within the state of Kentucky Midway (the United States)
- Coordinates: 36°33′05″N 88°19′26″W
- Country: United States
- State: Kentucky
- County: Calloway
- Elevation: 554 ft (169 m)
- Time zone: UTC-6 (Central (CST))
  - Summer (DST): UTC-5 (CST)
- GNIS feature ID: 508600

Midway (also Tobacco, Willisville) is an unincorporated community in Calloway County, Kentucky, United States.
