= List of current members of the Kentucky Fiscal Courts =

The Fiscal Court, under the Kentucky Constitution of 1891, is the name given to the county legislature and governing body of each of the counties in Kentucky. Despite the name, it no longer has any responsibility for judicial proceedings.

Each Fiscal Court consists of the County judge/executive and either three to eight magistrates elected from individual districts, or three commissioners elected from the county at large.

== Composition ==
The County Judge/Executive, the head of government of the county, is an ex officio member of the Fiscal Court and its presiding officer. Constitutionally, the Fiscal Court may either be composed of the magistrates for the county or of three commissioners elected from the county at large (except from areas within the jurisdiction of an independent city). For the purposes of the Fiscal Court, the title "justice of the peace" has been replaced by "magistrate" under the Fiscal Court Act of 1974.

Members of each court are elected in midterm elections to a four-year term, except the commissioners of Jefferson County which are elected to staggered terms.

== List ==
The following are members of the Fiscal Courts after the 2024 elections:

| County | Title | District | Member | Party | Elected | Notes |
|---|---|---|---|---|---|---|
| Adair | Judge/Executive | | Larry Bryant | Republican | 2022 | |
| Adair | Magistrate | 1 | Tony Denton | Republican | 2022 | |
| Adair | Magistrate | 2 | Daryl Flatt | Republican | 2022 | |
| Adair | Magistrate | 3 | Sammy Baker | Republican | 2022 | |
| Adair | Magistrate | 4 | Chris Reeder | Republican | 2022 | |
| Adair | Magistrate | 5 | Billy Dean Coffey | Republican | 2022 | |
| Adair | Magistrate | 6 | Mark Humphress | Republican | 2022 | |
| Adair | Magistrate | 7 | Terry M. Hadley | Republican | 2022 | |
| Allen | Judge/Executive | | Dennis Harper | Republican | 2022 | |
| Allen | Magistrate | 1 | Todd Bransford | Republican | 2022 | |
| Allen | Magistrate | 2 | Wendell Spears | Republican | 2022 | |
| Allen | Magistrate | 3 | Tony A. Wolfe | Republican | 2022 | |
| Allen | Magistrate | 4 | Rickey Cooksey | Republican | 2022 | |
| Allen | Magistrate | 5 | Anthony Thompson | Republican | 2022 | |
| Anderson | Judge/Executive | | Orbrey Gritton | Republican | 2022 | |
| Anderson | Magistrate | 1 | Rodney Durr | Republican | 2022 | |
| Anderson | Magistrate | 2 | Mike Riley | Republican | 2022 | |
| Anderson | Magistrate | 3 | Leslie Edmonson | Republican | 2024 | Special election |
| Anderson | Magistrate | 4 | Dean Durr | Republican | 2022 | |
| Anderson | Magistrate | 5 | David Montgomery | Republican | 2022 | |
| Anderson | Magistrate | 6 | Kenny Barnett | Republican | 2022 | |
| Ballard | Judge/Executive | | Todd Cooper | Republican | 2022 | |
| Ballard | Magistrate | 1 | Ryan Hedrick | Republican | 2022 | |
| Ballard | Magistrate | 2 | Jody Wilson Brown | Democratic | 2022 | |
| Ballard | Magistrate | 3 | Sonnie L. Dennis | Republican | 2022 | |
| Ballard | Magistrate | 4 | Nathan Whipple | Republican | 2022 | |
| Ballard | Magistrate | 5 | Henry Bisson | Republican | 2022 | |
| Barren | Judge/Executive | | Jamie Bewley Byrd | Republican | 2022 | |
| Barren | Magistrate | 1 | Jeffrey Botts | Republican | 2022 | |
| Barren | Magistrate | 2 | Derek Pedigo | Republican | 2022 | |
| Barren | Magistrate | 3 | Tim Durham | Republican | 2022 | |
| Barren | Magistrate | 4 | Tim S. Coomer | Republican | 2022 | |
| Barren | Magistrate | 5 | Phillip M. Kinslow | Republican | 2022 | |
| Barren | Magistrate | 6 | Ronnie Stinson | Democratic | 2022 | |
| Barren | Magistrate | 7 | Brad Groce | Republican | 2022 | Elected as a Democratic candidate, changed parties |
| Bath | Judge/Executive | | Forrest McKenzie | Republican | 2022 | |
| Bath | Commissioner | 1 | James White | Republican | 2022 | |
| Bath | Commissioner | 2 | Jimmy Craig | Democratic | 2022 | |
| Bath | Commissioner | 3 | Jamie Cline | Democratic | 2022 | |
| Bell | Judge/Executive | | Albey Brock | Republican | 2022 | |
| Bell | Magistrate | 1 | Eddie Saylor | Republican | 2022 | |
| Bell | Magistrate | 2 | Donald Lefevers | Republican | 2022 | |
| Bell | Magistrate | 3 | Lonnie E. Maiden | Republican | 2022 | |
| Bell | Magistrate | 4 | Glenn D. Webb | Republican | 2022 | |
| Bell | Magistrate | 5 | Joseph Hammontree | Republican | 2022 | |
| Boone | Judge/Executive | | Gary W. Moore | Republican | 2022 | |
| Boone | Commissioner | 1 | Cathy Flaig | Republican | 2022 | |
| Boone | Commissioner | 2 | Chet Hand | Republican | 2022 | |
| Boone | Commissioner | 3 | Jesse Brewer | Republican | 2022 | |
| Bourbon | Judge/Executive | | Michael R. Williams | Republican | 2022 | |
| Bourbon | Magistrate | 1 | Bart N. Horne | Republican | 2022 | |
| Bourbon | Magistrate | 2 | Kristal Cameron | Republican | 2023 | Special election |
| Bourbon | Magistrate | 3 | Todd Earlywine | Republican | 2022 | |
| Bourbon | Magistrate | 4 | Scott Wells | Republican | 2022 | |
| Bourbon | Magistrate | 5 | Henry Lovell | Republican | 2024 | Special election |
| Bourbon | Magistrate | 6 | Lewis Stubblefield | Republican | 2022 | |
| Bourbon | Magistrate | 7 | Bill Conner | Republican | 2022 | |
| Boyd | Judge/Executive | | Eric Chaney | Republican | 2022 | |
| Boyd | Commissioner | 1 | Dave Salisbury | Republican | 2022 | |
| Boyd | Commissioner | 2 | Jeremy Holbrook | Republican | 2022 | |
| Boyd | Commissioner | 3 | Randy Stapleton | Republican | 2022 | |
| Boyle | Judge/Executive | | Trille Bottom | Democratic | 2022 | |
| Boyle | Magistrate | 1 | Tom V. Ellis | Republican | 2022 | |
| Boyle | Magistrate | 2 | Paula Bodner | Republican | 2022 | |
| Boyle | Magistrate | 3 | Barry Harmon | Republican | 2022 | |
| Boyle | Magistrate | 4 | Jason Cullen | Republican | 2022 | |
| Boyle | Magistrate | 5 | Jamey Gay | Democratic | 2022 | |
| Boyle | Magistrate | 6 | Steven Sleeper | Republican | 2022 | |
| Bracken | Judge/Executive | | Tina Teegarden | Democratic | 2022 | |
| Bracken | Magistrate | 1 | Sandra Ruf | Republican | 2022 | |
| Bracken | Magistrate | 2 | William Craig Miller | Democratic | 2022 | |
| Bracken | Magistrate | 3 | David Kelsch | Republican | 2022 | Elected as a Democratic candidate, changed parties |
| Bracken | Magistrate | 4 | Daniel Holleran | Republican | 2022 | |
| Bracken | Magistrate | 5 | Deborah Mayfield | Republican | 2022 | |
| Bracken | Magistrate | 6 | John Titus Scott | Republican | 2022 | |
| Bracken | Magistrate | 7 | Heather Brumley | Republican | 2022 | |
| Bracken | Magistrate | 8 | Kevin Jarrells | Republican | 2022 | |
| Breathitt | Judge/Executive | | Jeff Noble | Democratic | 2022 | |
| Breathitt | Magistrate | 1 | Brenda Terry | Democratic | 2022 | |
| Breathitt | Magistrate | 2 | Billy Chaney | Democratic | 2022 | |
| Breathitt | Magistrate | 3 | Drewey Lovins | Democratic | 2022 | |
| Breathitt | Magistrate | 4 | John Marshall | Democratic | 2022 | |
| Breckinridge | Judge/Executive | | Maurice Lucas | Republican | 2022 | |
| Breckinridge | Magistrate | 1 | Jeremy Armstrong | Republican | 2022 | |
| Breckinridge | Magistrate | 2 | Phillip Beavin | Republican | 2022 | |
| Breckinridge | Magistrate | 3 | Gary Greenwell | Republican | 2022 | |
| Breckinridge | Magistrate | 4 | David Albright | Republican | 2022 | Elected as a Democratic candidate, changed parties |
| Breckinridge | Magistrate | 5 | Edwin Moore | Republican | 2022 | |
| Breckinridge | Magistrate | 6 | Charles Henning | Republican | 2022 | |
| Bullitt | Judge/Executive | | Jerry Summers | Republican | 2022 | |
| Bullitt | Magistrate | 1 | Vera Sanders | Republican | 2022 | |
| Bullitt | Magistrate | 2 | Shaun Logsdon | Republican | 2022 | |
| Bullitt | Magistrate | 3 | Karen Johnson | Republican | 2022 | |
| Bullitt | Magistrate | 4 | Brian Bleemel | Republican | 2022 | |
| Butler | Judge/Executive | | Timothy Flener | Republican | 2022 | |
| Butler | Magistrate | 1 | Stevie R. Givens | Republican | 2022 | |
| Butler | Magistrate | 2 | Kevin Phelps | Republican | 2022 | |
| Butler | Magistrate | 3 | Curtis Allen Smith | Republican | 2022 | |
| Butler | Magistrate | 4 | David Whittinghill | Republican | 2022 | |
| Butler | Magistrate | 5 | Dillon Bryant | Republican | 2022 | |
| Caldwell | Judge/Executive | | Dakota Young | Republican | 2022 | |
| Caldwell | Magistrate | 1 | Elbert Bennett | Republican | 2022 | |
| Caldwell | Magistrate | 2 | Jeff Boone | Republican | 2022 | |
| Caldwell | Magistrate | 3 | Brent Stallins | Republican | 2022 | |
| Caldwell | Magistrate | 4 | Jeff Sims | Republican | 2022 | |
| Calloway | Judge/Executive | | Kenny Imes | Republican | 2022 | |
| Calloway | Magistrate | 1 | Ricky Stewart | Republican | 2022 | |
| Calloway | Magistrate | 2 | Larry Crutcher | Republican | 2022 | |
| Calloway | Magistrate | 3 | Don Cherry | Republican | 2022 | |
| Calloway | Magistrate | 4 | Paul Rister | Republican | 2022 | |
| Campbell | Judge/Executive | | Steve Pendery | Republican | 2022 | |
| Campbell | Commissioner | 1 | Brian D. Painter | Republican | 2022 | |
| Campbell | Commissioner | 2 | Geoff Besecker | Republican | 2022 | |
| Campbell | Commissioner | 3 | Tom Lampe | Republican | 2022 | |
| Carlisle | Judge/Executive | | Greg H. Terry | Democratic | 2022 | |
| Carlisle | Magistrate | 1 | Lisa M. Adams | Republican | 2022 | |
| Carlisle | Magistrate | 2 | Matthew Oliver | Republican | 2022 | |
| Carlisle | Magistrate | 3 | Keith Crider | Republican | 2022 | |
| Carroll | Judge/Executive | | David Wilhoite | Democratic | 2022 | |
| Carroll | Magistrate | 1 | Benjamin Long | Republican | 2022 | |
| Carroll | Magistrate | 2 | Lowery Cable | Republican | 2022 | |
| Carroll | Magistrate | 3 | Jeffrey Nab | Republican | 2022 | |
| Carter | Judge/Executive | | Brandon Burton | Republican | 2022 | |
| Carter | Magistrate | 1 | Chris Huddle | Republican | 2022 | |
| Carter | Magistrate | 2 | Derrick McKinney | Republican | 2022 | |
| Carter | Magistrate | 3 | Millard Cordle | Republican | 2022 | |
| Carter | Magistrate | 4 | Danny Holbrook | Republican | 2022 | |
| Carter | Magistrate | 5 | Harley Rayburn | Republican | 2022 | |
| Casey | Judge/Executive | | Randy Dial | Republican | 2022 | |
| Casey | Magistrate | 1 | Cecil Roy | Republican | 2022 | |
| Casey | Magistrate | 2 | Bart Woodrum | Republican | 2022 | |
| Casey | Magistrate | 3 | Robby Murphy | Republican | 2022 | |
| Casey | Magistrate | 4 | Troy Sanders | Republican | 2022 | |
| Christian | Judge/Executive | | Jerry Gilliam | Republican | 2022 | |
| Christian | Magistrate | 1 | Magaline Ferguson | Democratic | 2022 | |
| Christian | Magistrate | 2 | Josh Turner | Republican | 2022 | |
| Christian | Magistrate | 3 | George Barnett | Republican | 2022 | |
| Christian | Magistrate | 4 | James Pryor | Republican | 2022 | |
| Christian | Magistrate | 5 | Rich Liebe | Democratic | 2022 | |
| Christian | Magistrate | 6 | Phillip R. Peterson | Republican | 2022 | |
| Christian | Magistrate | 7 | Russ Guffey | Republican | 2022 | |
| Christian | Magistrate | 8 | John Bruce | Republican | 2022 | |
| Clark | Judge/Executive | | Les Yates | Republican | 2022 | |
| Clark | Magistrate | 1 | Daniel Konstantopoulos | Republican | 2022 | |
| Clark | Magistrate | 2 | Ernest Pasley | Republican | 2022 | |
| Clark | Magistrate | 3 | Stephen Craycraft | Republican | 2022 | |
| Clark | Magistrate | 4 | Mark Miller | Republican | 2022 | |
| Clark | Magistrate | 5 | Christopher Micah Davis | Republican | 2022 | |
| Clark | Magistrate | 6 | Robert G. Blanton | Democratic | 2022 | |
| Clay | Judge/Executive | | Tommy Harmon | Republican | 2022 | |
| Clay | Magistrate | 1 | Russell Smith | Republican | 2022 | |
| Clay | Magistrate | 2 | Sonya Gray | Republican | 2022 | |
| Clay | Magistrate | 3 | Sonny Gay | Republican | 2022 | |
| Clay | Magistrate | 4 | Chris Smith | Republican | 2022 | |
| Clay | Magistrate | 5 | Jerry Combs | Republican | 2022 | |
| Clay | Magistrate | 6 | Bill Warren | Republican | 2022 | |
| Clinton | Judge/Executive | | Ricky Craig | Republican | 2022 | |
| Clinton | Magistrate | 1 | Tony Delk | Republican | 2022 | |
| Clinton | Magistrate | 2 | Jason Pitman | Republican | 2022 | |
| Clinton | Magistrate | 3 | Terry Buster | Republican | 2023 | Special election |
| Clinton | Magistrate | 4 | Gary Ferguson | Republican | 2022 | |
| Clinton | Magistrate | 5 | Jerry Lowhorn | Republican | 2022 | |
| Clinton | Magistrate | 6 | Mickey Riddle | Republican | 2022 | |
| Crittenden | Judge/Executive | | Perry A. Newcom | Republican | 2022 | |
| Crittenden | Magistrate | 1 | Dave Belt | Republican | 2022 | |
| Crittenden | Magistrate | 2 | Matt Grimes | Republican | 2022 | |
| Crittenden | Magistrate | 3 | Robert Kirby | Republican | 2022 | |
| Crittenden | Magistrate | 4 | Chad Thomas | Republican | 2022 | Elected as a Democratic candidate, changed parties |
| Crittenden | Magistrate | 5 | Travis Perryman | Republican | 2022 | |
| Crittenden | Magistrate | 6 | Scott Belt | Republican | 2022 | |
| Cumberland | Judge/Executive | | Luke King | Republican | 2022 | |
| Cumberland | Magistrate | 1 | Rondall Carl Wray | Republican | 2022 | |
| Cumberland | Magistrate | 2 | Lane Cope | Republican | 2022 | |
| Cumberland | Magistrate | 3 | Larry Anderson | Republican | 2022 | |
| Cumberland | Magistrate | 4 | Jeffery Allen Cyphers | Republican | 2022 | |
| Daviess | Judge/Executive | | Charles Castlen | Republican | 2022 | |
| Daviess | Commissioner | West | Christopher Castlen | Republican | 2022 | |
| Daviess | Commissioner | Central | Larry Conder | Republican | 2022 | |
| Daviess | Commissioner | East | Janie Marksberry | Republican | 2022 | |
| Edmonson | Judge/Executive | | Ronald Scott Lindsey | Republican | 2022 | |
| Edmonson | Magistrate | 1 | Mark Meeks | Republican | 2022 | Elected as a Democratic candidate, changed parties |
| Edmonson | Magistrate | 2 | TJ Massey | Republican | 2022 | |
| Edmonson | Magistrate | 3 | Anthony Hennion | Republican | 2022 | |
| Edmonson | Magistrate | 4 | Mickey Johnson | Republican | 2022 | |
| Edmonson | Magistrate | 5 | Gray Bagshaw | Republican | 2022 | |
| Edmonson | Magistrate | 6 | James C. Vincent | Republican | 2022 | |
| Elliott | Judge/Executive | | Myron S. Lewis | Democratic | 2022 | |
| Elliott | Magistrate | 1 | Emily Adkins | Democratic | 2022 | |
| Elliott | Magistrate | 2 | Michael Dickerson | Republican | 2022 | |
| Elliott | Magistrate | 3 | Charles L. Whitt | Republican | 2022 | |
| Elliott | Magistrate | 4 | Brian Dillon | Democratic | 2022 | |
| Elliott | Magistrate | 5 | Christopher Dickerson | Republican | 2022 | |
| Elliott | Magistrate | 6 | Dewey Smith | Democratic | 2022 | |
| Elliott | Magistrate | 7 | Darren Newell | Democratic | 2022 | |
| Estill | Judge/Executive | | Donnie R. Watson | Republican | 2022 | |
| Estill | Magistrate | 1 | Michael Abney | Democratic | 2022 | |
| Estill | Magistrate | 2 | Paul Tipton | Republican | 2022 | |
| Estill | Magistrate | 3 | Gerry Flannery | Republican | 2022 | |
| Fayette | Judge/Executive | | Mary Diane Hanna | Democratic | 2022 | |
| Fayette | Commissioner | 1 | Brian Miller | Democratic | 2022 | |
| Fayette | Commissioner | 2 | Alayne White | Democratic | 2022 | |
| Fayette | Commissioner | 3 | David Lowe | Democratic | 2022 | |
| Fleming | Judge/Executive | | John Sims Jr. | Republican | 2022 | |
| Fleming | Magistrate | 1 | Kerri Moran | Republican | 2022 | |
| Fleming | Magistrate | 2 | Taylor Hunt | Republican | 2022 | |
| Fleming | Magistrate | 3 | Richie J. Kielman | Republican | 2022 | |
| Fleming | Magistrate | 4 | Joe Dunaway | Republican | 2022 | |
| Fleming | Magistrate | 5 | Donnie Fawns | Republican | 2022 | |
| Fleming | Magistrate | 6 | Ray H. Money | Democratic | 2022 | |
| Floyd | Judge/Executive | | Robert Williams | Independent | 2022 | |
| Floyd | Magistrate | 1 | Mark Crider | Democratic | 2022 | |
| Floyd | Magistrate | 2 | George Ousley | Democratic | 2022 | |
| Floyd | Magistrate | 3 | Mike Tackett | Democratic | 2022 | |
| Floyd | Magistrate | 4 | Ronnie Akers | Democratic | 2022 | |
| Franklin | Judge/Executive | | Michael Mueller | Democratic | 2022 | |
| Franklin | Magistrate | 1 | Sherry Sebastian | Democratic | 2022 | |
| Franklin | Magistrate | 2 | James Weir Blackburn | Democratic | 2022 | |
| Franklin | Magistrate | 3 | Kelly Dycus | Democratic | 2022 | |
| Franklin | Magistrate | 4 | Michael Harrod | Democratic | 2024 | Special election |
| Franklin | Magistrate | 5 | Richard Tanner | Democratic | 2022 | |
| Franklin | Magistrate | 6 | Eric Whisman | Democratic | 2022 | |
| Fulton | Judge/Executive | | Jim Martin | Democratic | 2022 | |
| Fulton | Magistrate | 1 | Jim Paitsel | Democratic | 2022 | |
| Fulton | Magistrate | 2 | Wade Adams | Democratic | 2022 | |
| Fulton | Magistrate | 3 | Matt Moss | Democratic | 2022 | |
| Fulton | Magistrate | 4 | Butch Busby | Independent | 2022 | |
| Gallatin | Judge/Executive | | Jon Ryan Morris | Democratic | 2022 | |
| Gallatin | Magistrate | 1 | Ethan Moore | Democratic | 2022 | |
| Gallatin | Magistrate | 2 | Joel Shinkle | Republican | 2022 | |
| Gallatin | Magistrate | 3 | Michael Haddix | Republican | 2022 | |
| Gallatin | Magistrate | 4 | Donnie Sullivan | Republican | 2022 | Elected as a Democratic candidate, changed parties |
| Garrard | Judge/Executive | | Chris Elleman | Republican | 2022 | |
| Garrard | Magistrate | 1 | Chris Davis | Republican | 2022 | |
| Garrard | Magistrate | 2 | Chris Butner | Republican | 2022 | |
| Garrard | Magistrate | 3 | Glendon Barker | Republican | 2022 | |
| Garrard | Magistrate | 4 | Bobby Preston | Republican | 2022 | |
| Garrard | Magistrate | 5 | Wayne Day | Republican | 2022 | |
| Grant | Judge/Executive | | Charles Edward Dills II | Republican | 2022 | |
| Grant | Magistrate | 1 | Jacqalynn Riley | Republican | 2022 | |
| Grant | Magistrate | 2 | Shawna Coldiron | Republican | 2022 | |
| Grant | Magistrate | 3 | Roger Humphrey | Republican | 2022 | |
| Graves | Judge/Executive | | Jesse Perry | Independent | 2022 | |
| Graves | Commissioner | 1 | Danny Winfrey | Republican | 2022 | |
| Graves | Commissioner | 2 | Tyler Goodman | Republican | 2022 | |
| Graves | Commissioner | 3 | Todd Hayden | Republican | 2022 | |
| Grayson | Judge/Executive | | Michael Kevin Henderson | Republican | 2022 | |
| Grayson | Magistrate | 1 | Ben Hodges | Republican | 2022 | |
| Grayson | Magistrate | 2 | Phillip Darin Whitely | Republican | 2022 | |
| Grayson | Magistrate | 3 | Brenda Huffman | Republican | 2022 | |
| Grayson | Magistrate | 4 | Randy Jason Dennis | Republican | 2022 | |
| Grayson | Magistrate | 5 | Brian P. Ashley | Republican | 2022 | |
| Grayson | Magistrate | 6 | Charles Neal Saltsman | Republican | 2022 | |
| Green | Judge/Executive | | John H. Frank | Republican | 2022 | |
| Green | Magistrate | 1 | Andrew Parson | Republican | 2022 | |
| Green | Magistrate | 2 | Timothy Lee Darnell | Republican | 2022 | |
| Green | Magistrate | 3 | Steve Lewis | Republican | 2022 | |
| Green | Magistrate | 4 | Terry F. Aaron | Republican | 2022 | |
| Green | Magistrate | 5 | Charles Judd | Republican | 2022 | Redistricting: district to be eliminated in 2026 |
| Greenup | Judge/Executive | | Bobby Hall | Republican | 2022 | |
| Greenup | Commissioner | 1 | Derrick Bradley | Republican | 2022 | |
| Greenup | Commissioner | 2 | Lee Wireman | Republican | 2022 | |
| Greenup | Commissioner | 3 | Earnest Duty II | Republican | 2022 | |
| Hancock | Judge/Executive | | Johnny Roberts Jr. | Republican | 2022 | |
| Hancock | Magistrate | 1 | Brent Wayne Wigginton | Republican | 2024 | Special election |
| Hancock | Magistrate | 2 | Kasey Emmick | Democratic | 2022 | |
| Hancock | Magistrate | 3 | John Mark Gray | Republican | 2022 | |
| Hancock | Magistrate | 4 | Gary Baker | Republican | 2022 | |
| Hardin | Judge/Executive | | Keith Taul | Republican | 2022 | |
| Hardin | Magistrate | 1 | Chris Yates | Democratic | 2022 | |
| Hardin | Magistrate | 2 | Kenny Saltsman | Democratic | 2022 | |
| Hardin | Magistrate | 3 | Patsy Whitehead | Republican | 2022 | |
| Hardin | Magistrate | 4 | Fred Clem Jr. | Republican | 2022 | |
| Hardin | Magistrate | 5 | Aaron Pennington | Republican | 2022 | |
| Hardin | Magistrate | 6 | E. G. Thompson | Republican | 2022 | |
| Hardin | Magistrate | 7 | Larry Hicks | Republican | 2022 | |
| Hardin | Magistrate | 8 | Kenny Muse | Republican | 2022 | |
| Harlan | Judge/Executive | | Dan Mosley | Republican | 2022 | |
| Harlan | Magistrate | 1 | Paul Caldwell | Republican | 2023 | Special election |
| Harlan | Magistrate | 2 | Bill Moore | Republican | 2022 | |
| Harlan | Magistrate | 3 | Paul Browning | Republican | 2022 | |
| Harlan | Magistrate | 4 | Jimmy R. Roddy | Republican | 2022 | |
| Harlan | Magistrate | 5 | James Howard | Republican | 2022 | |
| Harrison | Judge/Executive | | Jason Marshall | Republican | 2022 | |
| Harrison | Magistrate | 1 | Stanley F. Lemons | Republican | 2022 | Elected as a Democratic candidate, changed parties |
| Harrison | Magistrate | 2 | Christopher A. Winkle | Democratic | 2022 | |
| Harrison | Magistrate | 3 | Daryl Northcutt | Republican | 2022 | |
| Harrison | Magistrate | 4 | Charles Garnett | Republican | 2022 | |
| Harrison | Magistrate | 5 | Jeremy Burden | Republican | 2022 | |
| Harrison | Magistrate | 6 | Brad Yearsley | Republican | 2022 | Elected as a Democratic candidate, changed parties |
| Harrison | Magistrate | 7 | Dwayne C. Florence | Republican | 2022 | |
| Harrison | Magistrate | 8 | Christopher Philpot | Republican | 2022 | |
| Hart | Judge/Executive | | Joe A. Choate | Democratic | 2022 | |
| Hart | Magistrate | 1 | Katherine Kenny | Republican | 2022 | |
| Hart | Magistrate | 2 | Ricky Alvey | Democratic | 2022 | |
| Hart | Magistrate | 3 | Ronald Riordan | Democratic | 2022 | |
| Hart | Magistrate | 4 | Doug Wells | Republican | 2022 | |
| Hart | Magistrate | 5 | Lee Miles | Republican | 2022 | Elected as a Democratic candidate, changed parties |
| Henderson | Judge/Executive | | Bradley L. Schneider | Republican | 2022 | |
| Henderson | Magistrate | 1 | Keith Berry | Republican | 2022 | Elected as a Democratic candidate, changed parties |
| Henderson | Magistrate | 2 | Taylor Tompkins | Republican | 2022 | |
| Henderson | Magistrate | 3 | Timothy J. Southard | Republican | 2022 | |
| Henderson | Magistrate | 4 | Billy Puttman | Democratic | 2022 | |
| Henderson | Magistrate | 5 | Bill Starks | Democratic | 2022 | |
| Henry | Judge/Executive | | Scott Bates | Republican | 2022 | |
| Henry | Magistrate | 1 | Edward Fredrick | Republican | 2022 | |
| Henry | Magistrate | 2 | Roger Hartlage | Republican | 2022 | |
| Henry | Magistrate | 3 | Kevin Gene McManis | Democratic | 2022 | |
| Henry | Magistrate | 4 | Danny Shain | Republican | 2022 | |
| Henry | Magistrate | 5 | Bradley Fisher | Republican | 2022 | |
| Henry | Magistrate | 6 | Carl Tingle | Republican | 2022 | |
| Hickman | Judge/Executive | | Kenny Wilson | Republican | 2022 | |
| Hickman | Magistrate | 1 | Henry Cole | Republican | 2022 | |
| Hickman | Magistrate | 2 | Kory Anthony Naranjo | Republican | 2022 | |
| Hickman | Magistrate | 3 | Irvin W. Stroud | Republican | 2022 | |
| Hopkins | Judge/Executive | | Jack Whitfield Jr. | Republican | 2022 | |
| Hopkins | Magistrate | 1 | Ricky L. Whitaker | Republican | 2022 | |
| Hopkins | Magistrate | 2 | Buddy Cardwell Jr. | Republican | 2022 | |
| Hopkins | Magistrate | 3 | Vicki Thomison | Democratic | 2022 | |
| Hopkins | Magistrate | 4 | Ronnie Noel | Republican | 2022 | |
| Hopkins | Magistrate | 5 | Billy Parrish | Independent | 2022 | |
| Hopkins | Magistrate | 6 | Charlie G. Beshears | Democratic | 2022 | |
| Hopkins | Magistrate | 7 | Hannah Myers | Republican | 2022 | |
| Jackson | Judge/Executive | | Shane Gabbard | Republican | 2022 | |
| Jackson | Magistrate | 1 | Danny Todd | Republican | 2022 | |
| Jackson | Magistrate | 2 | Raymond Vaughn | Republican | 2022 | |
| Jackson | Magistrate | 3 | Garvin P. Baker | Republican | 2022 | |
| Jefferson | Judge/Executive | | Queenie Averette | Democratic | 2022 | |
| Jefferson | Commissioner | A | Noah Karsten Grimes | Democratic | 2022 | |
| Jefferson | Commissioner | B | Mark S. Lynch | Democratic | 2024 | |
| Jefferson | Commissioner | C | Kathleen Parks | Democratic | 2024 | |
| Jessamine | Judge/Executive | | David K. West | Republican | 2022 | |
| Jessamine | Magistrate | 1 | Fred Allen Meyer | | — | Appointed November 2024 |
| Jessamine | Magistrate | 2 | Tim Vaughan | Republican | 2022 | |
| Jessamine | Magistrate | 3 | Terry L. Meckstroth | Republican | 2022 | |
| Jessamine | Magistrate | 4 | Kent Slusher | Republican | 2022 | |
| Jessamine | Magistrate | 5 | Adam Teater | Republican | 2022 | |
| Jessamine | Magistrate | 6 | Gary E. Morgan | Republican | 2022 | |
| Johnson | Judge/Executive | | Mark McKenzie | Republican | 2022 | |
| Johnson | Commissioner | 1 | Jessica Click | Republican | 2022 | |
| Johnson | Commissioner | 2 | Mike Jarrell | Republican | 2022 | |
| Johnson | Commissioner | 3 | Timothy Salyer | Republican | 2022 | |
| Kenton | Judge/Executive | | Kris Knochelmann | Republican | 2022 | |
| Kenton | Commissioner | 1 | Beth Sewell | Republican | 2022 | |
| Kenton | Commissioner | 2 | Jon E. Draud | Republican | 2022 | |
| Kenton | Commissioner | 3 | Joe Nienaber Jr. | Republican | 2022 | |
| Knott | Judge/Executive | | Jeff Dobson | Republican | 2022 | |
| Knott | Magistrate | 1 | Carl Craft | Republican | 2022 | |
| Knott | Magistrate | 2 | Ricky Thomas | Republican | 2022 | |
| Knott | Magistrate | 3 | Brent Smith | Democratic | 2022 | |
| Knott | Magistrate | 4 | Calvin Waddles | Democratic | 2022 | |
| Knox | Judge/Executive | | Mike Mitchell | Republican | 2022 | |
| Knox | Magistrate | 1 | Rogers Mills | Republican | 2022 | |
| Knox | Magistrate | 2 | Keith Abner | Republican | 2022 | |
| Knox | Magistrate | 3 | Tony Golden | Republican | 2022 | |
| Knox | Magistrate | 4 | Jeff Ketcham | Republican | 2022 | |
| Knox | Magistrate | 5 | Samuel Miller | Republican | 2022 | |
| LaRue | Judge/Executive | | Stephen Blake Durrett | Republican | 2022 | Elected as a Democratic candidate, changed parties |
| LaRue | Magistrate | 1 | Darrin Williams | Republican | 2022 | |
| LaRue | Magistrate | 2 | Ricky Whitlock | Republican | 2022 | |
| LaRue | Magistrate | 3 | Dean Higdon | Republican | 2022 | |
| LaRue | Magistrate | 4 | Larry Howell | Republican | 2022 | |
| Laurel | Judge/Executive | | David Westerfield | Republican | 2022 | |
| Laurel | Magistrate | 1 | John Crawford | Republican | 2022 | |
| Laurel | Magistrate | 2 | Danny Smith | Republican | 2022 | |
| Laurel | Magistrate | 3 | Bobby L. Overbay | Republican | 2022 | |
| Laurel | Magistrate | 4 | Jeff Book | Republican | 2022 | |
| Laurel | Magistrate | 5 | Billy Oakley | Republican | 2022 | |
| Laurel | Magistrate | 6 | Richard D. Bales | Republican | 2022 | |
| Lawrence | Judge/Executive | | Phillip Carter | Republican | 2022 | |
| Lawrence | Magistrate | 1 | Michael R. Halcomb | Republican | 2022 | |
| Lawrence | Magistrate | 2 | Jonathan B. Scaggs | Republican | 2022 | |
| Lawrence | Magistrate | 3 | David M. Pinson | Republican | 2022 | |
| Lawrence | Magistrate | 4 | Rick Blackburn | Republican | 2022 | |
| Lee | Judge/Executive | | Steve Mays | Republican | 2022 | |
| Lee | Magistrate | 1 | Timothy Brandenburg | Republican | 2022 | |
| Lee | Magistrate | 2 | Dennis Pelfrey | Republican | 2022 | |
| Lee | Magistrate | 3 | Rodney Ross | Republican | 2022 | |
| Lee | Magistrate | 4 | Dean Noe | Republican | 2022 | |
| Leslie | Judge/Executive | | William Lewis | Republican | 2022 | |
| Leslie | Magistrate | 1 | Russell D. Brock | Republican | 2022 | |
| Leslie | Magistrate | 2 | Roscoe Asher | Republican | 2022 | |
| Leslie | Magistrate | 3 | Dusty Baker | Republican | 2022 | |
| Leslie | Magistrate | 4 | John E. Newell | Republican | 2022 | |
| Letcher | Judge/Executive | | Terry G. Adams | Republican | 2022 | |
| Letcher | Magistrate | 1 | Jack Banks | Republican | 2022 | |
| Letcher | Magistrate | 2 | Kenneth Anderson | Republican | 2022 | |
| Letcher | Magistrate | 3 | Debra Collier | Democratic | 2022 | |
| Letcher | Magistrate | 4 | William C. Smith | Democratic | 2022 | |
| Letcher | Magistrate | 5 | Bennie McCall | Democratic | 2022 | |
| Lewis | Judge/Executive | | George Sparks | Republican | 2022 | |
| Lewis | Magistrate | 1 | Johnny Osborne | Republican | 2022 | |
| Lewis | Magistrate | 2 | Joey McCann | Republican | 2022 | |
| Lewis | Magistrate | 3 | Woody Underwood | Republican | 2022 | |
| Lewis | Magistrate | 4 | Mark Horsley | Republican | 2022 | |
| Lincoln | Judge/Executive | | J. Woods Adams III | Republican | 2022 | |
| Lincoln | Magistrate | 1 | David Faulkner | Republican | 2022 | |
| Lincoln | Magistrate | 2 | Dan Gutenson | Republican | 2022 | |
| Lincoln | Magistrate | 3 | Bobby King | Republican | 2022 | |
| Lincoln | Magistrate | 4 | Joseph Stanley | Republican | 2022 | |
| Livingston | Judge/Executive | | Michael Chad Williams | Republican | 2024 | Special election |
| Livingston | Magistrate | 1 | Bill Lipham | Republican | 2022 | |
| Livingston | Magistrate | 2 | Mark Long | Republican | 2022 | |
| Livingston | Magistrate | 3 | Bradley Keith Hunter | Republican | 2022 | |
| Livingston | Magistrate | 4 | Klay Southern | Republican | 2022 | |
| Logan | Judge/Executive | | Phillip Baker | Republican | 2022 | |
| Logan | Magistrate | 1 | Tyler R. Davenport | Republican | 2022 | Elected as a Democratic candidate, changed parties |
| Logan | Magistrate | 2 | Jamie Goodwin | Republican | 2022 | |
| Logan | Magistrate | 3 | Chris Wilcutt | Republican | 2022 | |
| Logan | Magistrate | 4 | Jason Harper | Republican | 2022 | |
| Logan | Magistrate | 5 | Anne Crawford | Republican | 2022 | |
| Logan | Magistrate | 6 | Thomas P. Bouldin | Democratic | 2022 | |
| Lyon | Judge/Executive | | Jaime Green-Smith | Republican | 2022 | |
| Lyon | Magistrate | 1 | Bobby Cummins | Democratic | 2022 | |
| Lyon | Magistrate | 2 | Quin Tyler Sutton | Republican | 2022 | |
| Lyon | Magistrate | 3 | Jeff Fowler | Democratic | 2022 | |
| Madison | Judge/Executive | | Reagan Taylor | Republican | 2022 | |
| Madison | Magistrate | 1 | James Combs | Republican | 2022 | |
| Madison | Magistrate | 2 | Stephen Lochmueller | Republican | 2022 | |
| Madison | Magistrate | 3 | Billy Hughes | Republican | 2022 | |
| Madison | Magistrate | 4 | Tom Botkin | Republican | 2022 | |
| Magoffin | Judge/Executive | | Matthew C. Wireman | Democratic | 2022 | |
| Magoffin | Magistrate | 1 | Darrell Howard | Republican | 2022 | |
| Magoffin | Magistrate | 2 | Eddie Jenkins | Republican | 2022 | |
| Magoffin | Magistrate | 3 | Sam Bailey | Democratic | 2022 | |
| Marion | Judge/Executive | | David Daugherty | Democratic | 2022 | |
| Marion | Magistrate | 1 | Joseph Kirkland | Democratic | 2022 | |
| Marion | Magistrate | 2 | Larry Mattingly | Democratic | 2022 | |
| Marion | Magistrate | 3 | Craig Allen Bishop | Democratic | 2022 | |
| Marion | Magistrate | 4 | John Fogle | Democratic | 2022 | |
| Marion | Magistrate | 5 | Calab Buckman | Democratic | 2022 | |
| Marshall | Judge/Executive | | Kevin Spraggs | Republican | 2022 | |
| Marshall | Commissioner | 1 | Eddie McGuire | Republican | 2022 | |
| Marshall | Commissioner | 2 | Marty Barrett | Republican | 2022 | |
| Marshall | Commissioner | 3 | Monti R. Collins | Republican | 2022 | |
| Martin | Judge/Executive | | Lon Lafferty | Republican | 2022 | |
| Martin | Magistrate | 1 | Cody Slone | Republican | 2022 | |
| Martin | Magistrate | 2 | Kermit Howell | Republican | 2022 | |
| Martin | Magistrate | 3 | Tracy Spence | Republican | 2022 | |
| Martin | Magistrate | 4 | Junior Hunt | Republican | 2022 | |
| Martin | Magistrate | 5 | Ronald Workman | Republican | 2022 | |
| Mason | Judge/Executive | | Owen J. McNeill | Democratic | 2022 | |
| Mason | Commissioner | 1 | Joseph G. McKay | Democratic | 2022 | |
| Mason | Commissioner | 2 | Chris O'Hearn | Democratic | 2022 | |
| Mason | Commissioner | 3 | Peggy Frame | Republican | 2022 | |
| McCracken | Judge/Executive | | Craig Clymer | Republican | 2022 | |
| McCracken | Commissioner | 1 | J. W. Bartleman | Republican | 2022 | |
| McCracken | Commissioner | 2 | Richard Abraham | Republican | 2022 | |
| McCracken | Commissioner | 3 | Edwin Jones | Republican | 2022 | |
| McCreary | Judge/Executive | | Jimmie W. Greene | Republican | 2022 | |
| McCreary | Magistrate | 1 | William D. Hale Jr. | Republican | 2022 | |
| McCreary | Magistrate | 2 | William Taylor | Republican | 2023 | Special election |
| McCreary | Magistrate | 3 | Bobby Strunk | Republican | 2022 | |
| McCreary | Magistrate | 4 | Randy Maxwell | Republican | 2022 | |
| McLean | Judge/Executive | | Curtis Dame | Republican | 2022 | |
| McLean | Magistrate | Northwest | Dale Ayer | Republican | 2023 | Special election |
| McLean | Magistrate | Northeast | Clay Troutman | Republican | 2022 | |
| McLean | Magistrate | Southeast | Robert N. Bishop | Democratic | 2022 | |
| McLean | Magistrate | Southwest | Joseph P. Lowery | Republican | 2022 | |
| Meade | Judge/Executive | | Troy Kok | Republican | 2022 | |
| Meade | Magistrate | 1 | Thomas J. Goddard | Republican | 2022 | |
| Meade | Magistrate | 2 | Donald Eli Dix Jr. | Republican | 2022 | |
| Meade | Magistrate | 3 | Billy Sipes | Republican | 2022 | |
| Meade | Magistrate | 4 | Gray P. Chapman | Republican | 2022 | |
| Meade | Magistrate | 5 | Steve Wardrip | Republican | 2022 | |
| Meade | Magistrate | 6 | Trey Webb | Republican | 2022 | |
| Menifee | Judge/Executive | | Hector Alcala | Republican | — | Appointed September 2025 |
| Menifee | Magistrate | 1 | Pamela Ballard | Democratic | 2022 | |
| Menifee | Magistrate | 2 | Ollie Whitaker | Democratic | 2022 | |
| Menifee | Magistrate | 3 | Forrest Mullins | Democratic | 2022 | |
| Menifee | Magistrate | 4 | Ricky Bair | Democratic | 2022 | |
| Menifee | Magistrate | 5 | Ricky Peck | Democratic | 2022 | |
| Mercer | Judge/Executive | | Sarah Steele | Republican | 2022 | |
| Mercer | Magistrate | 1 | Stephen Elliott | Republican | 2022 | |
| Mercer | Magistrate | 2 | Tim Darland | Republican | 2022 | |
| Mercer | Magistrate | 3 | Jackie Claycomb | Republican | 2022 | |
| Mercer | Magistrate | 4 | Susan Barrington | Republican | 2022 | |
| Mercer | Magistrate | 5 | Kevin Hicks | Republican | 2022 | |
| Mercer | Magistrate | 6 | Dennis Holiday | Republican | 2022 | |
| Metcalfe | Judge/Executive | | Larry Wilson | Democratic | 2022 | |
| Metcalfe | Magistrate | 1 | Harvey Hawkins | Democratic | 2022 | |
| Metcalfe | Magistrate | 2 | Kevin Crain | Republican | 2022 | |
| Metcalfe | Magistrate | 3 | Daniel Bragg | Republican | 2022 | |
| Metcalfe | Magistrate | 4 | Ronnie Miller | Republican | 2022 | |
| Monroe | Judge/Executive | | Mitchell Page | Republican | 2022 | |
| Monroe | Magistrate | 1 | Jaime Veach | Republican | 2022 | |
| Monroe | Magistrate | 2 | Ronnie Page | Republican | 2022 | |
| Monroe | Magistrate | 3 | Ricky J. Bartley | Republican | 2022 | |
| Monroe | Magistrate | 4 | Nathan Fox | Republican | 2022 | |
| Monroe | Magistrate | 5 | Mark Williams | Republican | 2022 | |
| Montgomery | Judge/Executive | | Christopher Haddix | Republican | 2022 | |
| Montgomery | Commissioner | 1 | Ralph Charles | Republican | 2022 | |
| Montgomery | Commissioner | 2 | William Carmichael | Republican | 2022 | |
| Montgomery | Commissioner | 3 | Shayne Parker | Republican | 2022 | |
| Morgan | Judge/Executive | | Jim Gazay | Republican | 2022 | |
| Morgan | Magistrate | 1 | Eric Pelfrey | Democratic | 2022 | |
| Morgan | Magistrate | 2 | Donnie Keeton | Democratic | 2022 | |
| Morgan | Magistrate | 3 | Tommy Fannin | Republican | 2022 | |
| Morgan | Magistrate | 4 | Brandon Evans | Democratic | 2022 | |
| Morgan | Magistrate | 5 | Leroy Phipps | Independent | 2022 | Elected as a Democratic candidate, changed parties |
| Muhlenberg | Judge/Executive | | Mack McGehee | Republican | 2022 | |
| Muhlenberg | Magistrate | 1 | Malcolm West | Democratic | 2022 | |
| Muhlenberg | Magistrate | 2 | Darrin Benton | Republican | 2022 | |
| Muhlenberg | Magistrate | 3 | Jeff Vincent | Democratic | 2022 | |
| Muhlenberg | Magistrate | 4 | Keith Phillips | Democratic | 2022 | |
| Muhlenberg | Magistrate | 5 | Andrew Bullock | Republican | 2022 | |
| Nelson | Judge/Executive | | Tim Hutchins | Republican | 2022 | |
| Nelson | Magistrate | 1 | Keith Metcalfe | Democratic | 2022 | |
| Nelson | Magistrate | 2 | Adam Wheatley | Republican | 2022 | |
| Nelson | Magistrate | 3 | M. T. Harned | Republican | 2022 | |
| Nelson | Magistrate | 4 | Jeffrey G. Lear | Republican | 2022 | |
| Nelson | Magistrate | 5 | Jon Snow | Republican | 2022 | |
| Nicholas | Judge/Executive | | Steve Hamilton | Democratic | 2022 | |
| Nicholas | Magistrate | 1 | Rodney Matthews | Republican | 2022 | |
| Nicholas | Magistrate | 2 | Matt Hughes | Democratic | 2022 | |
| Nicholas | Magistrate | 3 | Kenny Holbrook | Democratic | 2022 | |
| Nicholas | Magistrate | 4 | Tommy Crawford | Republican | 2022 | |
| Nicholas | Magistrate | 5 | Ross Haney | Democratic | 2022 | |
| Ohio | Judge/Executive | | David Johnston | Republican | 2022 | |
| Ohio | Magistrate | 1 | Michael McKenney | Republican | 2022 | |
| Ohio | Magistrate | 2 | Jason Bullock | Republican | 2022 | Elected as a Democratic candidate, changed parties |
| Ohio | Magistrate | 3 | Bo Bennett | Republican | 2022 | |
| Ohio | Magistrate | 4 | Robert Beavin | Republican | 2024 | Special election |
| Ohio | Magistrate | 5 | Larry W. Morphew | Republican | 2022 | |
| Oldham | Judge/Executive | | David Voegele | Republican | 2022 | |
| Oldham | Magistrate | 1 | Brent Likins | Republican | 2022 | |
| Oldham | Magistrate | 2 | Wayne Theiss | Republican | 2022 | |
| Oldham | Magistrate | 3 | Kevin Woosley | Republican | 2022 | |
| Oldham | Magistrate | 4 | Kevin Jeffries | Republican | 2022 | |
| Oldham | Magistrate | 5 | Christopher Haunz | Republican | 2022 | |
| Oldham | Magistrate | 6 | Stephanie Hawkins | Republican | 2022 | |
| Oldham | Magistrate | 7 | Bob Dye | Republican | 2022 | |
| Oldham | Magistrate | 8 | Mike Logsdon | Republican | 2022 | |
| Owen | Judge/Executive | | Todd Woodyard | Republican | 2023 | Special election |
| Owen | Magistrate | 1 | Tom Slayback | Republican | 2022 | |
| Owen | Magistrate | 2 | Dane Perkins | Republican | 2022 | |
| Owen | Magistrate | 3 | Hershal Wayne Harris | Republican | 2022 | |
| Owen | Magistrate | 4 | Travis Fitzgerald | Republican | 2022 | |
| Owsley | Judge/Executive | | Zeke Little | Republican | 2022 | |
| Owsley | Magistrate | 1 | Alan Taylor | Republican | 2022 | |
| Owsley | Magistrate | 2 | Jason Reed | Republican | 2022 | |
| Owsley | Magistrate | 3 | Jeffrey Dooley | Republican | 2022 | |
| Pendleton | Judge/Executive | | David S. Fields | Republican | 2022 | |
| Pendleton | Magistrate | 1 | Alan Ray Whaley | Republican | 2022 | |
| Pendleton | Magistrate | 2 | Josh Plummer | Republican | 2022 | |
| Pendleton | Magistrate | 3 | Darrin Gregg | Republican | 2022 | |
| Pendleton | Magistrate | 4 | Rick Mineer | Republican | 2022 | Elected as a Democratic candidate, changed parties |
| Perry | Judge/Executive | | Scott Alexander | Democratic | 2022 | |
| Perry | Magistrate | 1 | Jimmy Spencer | Democratic | 2022 | |
| Perry | Magistrate | 2 | Ronald D. Combs | Democratic | 2022 | |
| Perry | Magistrate | 3 | Clayton Church | Democratic | 2022 | |
| Pike | Judge/Executive | | Ray Jones II | Democratic | 2022 | |
| Pike | Commissioner | 1 | Ronald Scott | Republican | 2022 | 6 magistrates to be elected in 2026 |
| Pike | Commissioner | 2 | Clinard Adkins | Republican | 2022 | 6 magistrates to be elected in 2026 |
| Pike | Commissioner | 3 | J. F. Lewis | Republican | 2024 | Special election; 6 magistrates to be elected in 2026 |
| Powell | Judge/Executive | | Eddie Barnes | Republican | 2022 | |
| Powell | Magistrate | 1 | Chad A. Patton | Independent | 2022 | Elected as a Democratic candidate, changed parties |
| Powell | Magistrate | 2 | Dennis L. Combs | Republican | 2022 | |
| Powell | Magistrate | 3 | Mike Lockard | Republican | 2022 | Elected as a Democratic candidate, changed parties |
| Powell | Magistrate | 4 | James Bowen | Republican | 2022 | |
| Powell | Magistrate | 5 | Brian McKinney | Republican | 2022 | |
| Pulaski | Judge/Executive | | Marshall Todd | Republican | 2022 | |
| Pulaski | Magistrate | 1 | Jason Turpen | Republican | 2022 | |
| Pulaski | Magistrate | 2 | Mike L. Wilson | Republican | 2022 | |
| Pulaski | Magistrate | 3 | Jimmy Wheeldon | Republican | 2022 | |
| Pulaski | Magistrate | 4 | Mark W. Ranshaw | Republican | 2022 | |
| Pulaski | Magistrate | 5 | Mike Strunk | Republican | 2022 | |
| Robertson | Judge/Executive | | Valerie Grigson | Republican | 2022 | |
| Robertson | Magistrate | 1 | Rita Goddard | Democratic | 2022 | |
| Robertson | Magistrate | 2 | Terry Cracraft | Democratic | 2022 | |
| Robertson | Magistrate | 3 | Larry Jones | Democratic | 2022 | |
| Robertson | Magistrate | 4 | Troy Martin | Democratic | 2022 | |
| Robertson | Magistrate | 5 | Billy Stitt | Democratic | 2022 | |
| Rockcastle | Judge/Executive | | Howell Holbrook Jr. | Republican | 2022 | |
| Rockcastle | Magistrate | 1 | Lee Adams | Republican | 2022 | |
| Rockcastle | Magistrate | 2 | William Denny | Republican | 2022 | |
| Rockcastle | Magistrate | 3 | Doug Prewitt | Republican | 2022 | |
| Rockcastle | Magistrate | 4 | Shane Thacker | Republican | 2022 | |
| Rockcastle | Magistrate | 5 | Michael P. McGuire | Republican | 2022 | |
| Rowan | Judge/Executive | | Harry Clark | Democratic | 2022 | |
| Rowan | Magistrate | 1 | Ray D. White | Democratic | 2022 | |
| Rowan | Magistrate | 2 | Darrell Glover | Democratic | 2022 | |
| Rowan | Magistrate | 3 | Charlie Winkleman | Democratic | 2022 | |
| Rowan | Magistrate | 4 | Rob Hamm | Democratic | 2022 | |
| Russell | Judge/Executive | | Randy Marcum | Republican | 2022 | |
| Russell | Magistrate | 1 | Terry Waddell | Republican | 2022 | |
| Russell | Magistrate | 2 | Mickey Garner | Republican | 2022 | |
| Russell | Magistrate | 3 | Zach Wilson | Republican | 2022 | |
| Russell | Magistrate | 4 | Steve Richardson | Republican | 2022 | |
| Russell | Magistrate | 5 | Larry Skaggs | Republican | 2022 | |
| Scott | Judge/Executive | | Joseph P. Covington | Republican | 2022 | |
| Scott | Magistrate | 1 | Rick Hostetler | Republican | 2022 | |
| Scott | Magistrate | 2 | Rob Jones | Republican | 2022 | |
| Scott | Magistrate | 3 | Chad S. Wallace | Republican | 2022 | |
| Scott | Magistrate | 4 | Kelly Corman | Republican | 2022 | |
| Scott | Magistrate | 5 | Dwayne Ellison | Republican | 2022 | |
| Scott | Magistrate | 6 | Ryan Pratt | Republican | 2022 | |
| Scott | Magistrate | 7 | David Livingston | Republican | 2022 | |
| Shelby | Judge/Executive | | Danny Ison | Republican | 2022 | |
| Shelby | Magistrate | 1 | Jon Swindler | Republican | 2022 | |
| Shelby | Magistrate | 2 | Karen Waller | Republican | 2022 | |
| Shelby | Magistrate | 3 | Joey Riddle Sr. | Republican | 2022 | |
| Shelby | Magistrate | 4 | Bill L. Hedges | Republican | 2022 | |
| Shelby | Magistrate | 5 | Gene Witt | Republican | 2022 | |
| Shelby | Magistrate | 6 | Brock Lisby | Republican | 2022 | |
| Shelby | Magistrate | 7 | Danny Eades | Republican | 2022 | |
| Simpson | Judge/Executive | | Mason Barnes | Republican | 2022 | |
| Simpson | Magistrate | North | William S. Poston | Republican | 2022 | |
| Simpson | Magistrate | East | Marty Chandler | Republican | 2022 | |
| Simpson | Magistrate | South | Myron C. Thurman | Republican | 2022 | |
| Simpson | Magistrate | West | Jeffrey Burr | Republican | 2022 | |
| Spencer | Judge/Executive | | Scott Travis | Republican | 2022 | |
| Spencer | Magistrate | 1 | Dan Pharris | Republican | 2022 | |
| Spencer | Magistrate | 2 | Mike Stump | Republican | 2022 | |
| Spencer | Magistrate | 3 | Jimmy Travis | Republican | 2022 | |
| Spencer | Magistrate | 4 | Zach Cotton | Republican | 2022 | |
| Spencer | Magistrate | 5 | Will Eldridge | Republican | 2022 | |
| Taylor | Judge/Executive | | Barry Smith | Republican | 2022 | |
| Taylor | Magistrate | 1 | James E. Jones | Republican | 2022 | |
| Taylor | Magistrate | 2 | Timmy Newton | Republican | 2022 | |
| Taylor | Magistrate | 3 | Tommy Corbin | Republican | 2022 | |
| Taylor | Magistrate | 4 | Zuel S. Yarberry | Republican | 2022 | |
| Taylor | Magistrate | 5 | Derrick Bright | Republican | 2022 | |
| Taylor | Magistrate | 6 | Richard A. Phillips | Republican | 2022 | |
| Todd | Judge/Executive | | Todd Mansfield | Republican | 2022 | Elected as a Democratic candidate, changed parties |
| Todd | Magistrate | 1 | Alfred Blake | Democratic | 2022 | |
| Todd | Magistrate | 2 | Billy Bryant | Republican | 2022 | |
| Todd | Magistrate | 3 | Brent Brookshire | Republican | 2022 | |
| Todd | Magistrate | 4 | Boogie Oliver | Republican | 2022 | |
| Todd | Magistrate | 5 | James Turner | Democratic | 2022 | |
| Trigg | Judge/Executive | | Stan Humphries | Republican | 2022 | |
| Trigg | Magistrate | 1 | Michael L. Wright | Republican | 2022 | Elected as a Democratic candidate, changed parties |
| Trigg | Magistrate | 2 | Barry Littlejohn | Republican | 2022 | |
| Trigg | Magistrate | 3 | Cameron Sumner | Republican | 2022 | |
| Trigg | Magistrate | 4 | Jeff Broadbent | Democratic | 2022 | |
| Trigg | Magistrate | 5 | Alana Baker Dunn | Republican | 2022 | |
| Trigg | Magistrate | 6 | Patrick Bush | Republican | 2022 | |
| Trigg | Magistrate | 7 | William M. Lane | Republican | 2022 | |
| Trimble | Judge/Executive | | John Ogburn Jr. | Republican | 2022 | |
| Trimble | Magistrate | 1 | Chris Liter | Democratic | 2022 | |
| Trimble | Magistrate | 2 | Melissa Cornish | Republican | 2022 | |
| Trimble | Magistrate | 3 | John D. Jones | Republican | 2022 | |
| Trimble | Magistrate | 4 | Crystal Whitice | Republican | 2022 | |
| Union | Judge/Executive | | Adam R. O'Nan | Republican | 2022 | |
| Union | Magistrate | 1 | Rick Wyatt | Republican | 2022 | |
| Union | Magistrate | 2 | Jerri Floyd | Democratic | 2022 | |
| Union | Magistrate | 3 | James R. Ricketts | Republican | 2022 | |
| Union | Magistrate | 4 | Dakota Jones | Republican | 2022 | |
| Union | Magistrate | 5 | Bo Girten | Republican | 2022 | |
| Warren | Judge/Executive | | Doug Gorman | Republican | 2022 | |
| Warren | Magistrate | 1 | Scott Lasley | Republican | 2022 | |
| Warren | Magistrate | 2 | Tom Lawrence | Democratic | 2022 | |
| Warren | Magistrate | 3 | Rick Williams | Republican | 2022 | |
| Warren | Magistrate | 4 | Rex McWhorter | Republican | 2022 | |
| Warren | Magistrate | 5 | Eric Aldridge | Republican | 2022 | |
| Warren | Magistrate | 6 | Ron Cummings | Republican | 2022 | |
| Washington | Judge/Executive | | Timothy E. Graves | Democratic | 2022 | |
| Washington | Magistrate | 1 | Dallas Lewis | Republican | 2022 | |
| Washington | Magistrate | 2 | Steve A. Devine | Republican | 2022 | |
| Washington | Magistrate | 3 | Bobby L. Russell | Republican | 2022 | |
| Washington | Magistrate | 4 | Stephen V. Carney | Republican | 2022 | |
| Washington | Magistrate | 5 | Matt Medley | Republican | 2022 | |
| Washington | Magistrate | 6 | Phillip Carrico | Democratic | 2022 | |
| Wayne | Judge/Executive | | Scott Gehring | Republican | 2022 | |
| Wayne | Magistrate | 1 | Ronnie Turner | Republican | 2022 | |
| Wayne | Magistrate | 2 | Jeffrey Darrell Dishman | Republican | 2022 | |
| Wayne | Magistrate | 3 | Gerald Wade Dick | Republican | 2022 | |
| Wayne | Magistrate | 4 | Jonathan Dobbs | Republican | 2022 | |
| Webster | Judge/Executive | | Stephen R. Henry | Republican | 2022 | |
| Webster | Magistrate | 1 | Chad E. Townsend | Republican | 2022 | Elected as a Democratic candidate, changed parties |
| Webster | Magistrate | 2 | Bob Hardison | Republican | 2022 | |
| Webster | Magistrate | 3 | Tony Felker | Republican | 2022 | Elected as a Democratic candidate, changed parties |
| Whitley | Judge/Executive | | Pascal R. White Jr. | Republican | 2022 | |
| Whitley | Magistrate | 1 | Scotty Harrison | Republican | 2022 | |
| Whitley | Magistrate | 2 | Mondo Cima | Republican | 2022 | |
| Whitley | Magistrate | 3 | Michael Jarboe | Republican | 2022 | |
| Whitley | Magistrate | 4 | Raleigh Meadors | Republican | 2022 | |
| Wolfe | Judge/Executive | | Raymond Banks | Democratic | 2022 | |
| Wolfe | Magistrate | 1 | Arthur Vest | Democratic | 2022 | |
| Wolfe | Magistrate | 2 | Gene Booth | Democratic | 2022 | |
| Wolfe | Magistrate | 3 | Billy Banks | Democratic | 2022 | |
| Woodford | Judge/Executive | | James Kay | Democratic | 2022 | |
| Woodford | Magistrate | 1 | Liles Taylor | Democratic | 2022 | |
| Woodford | Magistrate | 2 | John Gentry | Democratic | 2022 | |
| Woodford | Magistrate | 3 | Darrell Varner | Republican | 2022 | |
| Woodford | Magistrate | 4 | Kelly Carl | Democratic | 2022 | |
| Woodford | Magistrate | 5 | William Downey | Democratic | 2022 | |
| Woodford | Magistrate | 6 | Larry G. Blackford | Democratic | 2022 | |
| Woodford | Magistrate | 7 | Mary Ann Gill | Republican | 2022 | |
| Woodford | Magistrate | 8 | Jackie Brown | Democratic | 2022 | |

== See also ==
- List of counties in Kentucky
