= Dexter, Kentucky =

Unincorporated community in Kentucky, United States

- Census-designated place
- Location within Kentucky
- Coordinates: 36°44′34″N 88°17′47″W
- Country: United States
- State: Kentucky
- County: Calloway

Area
  - Total: 0.55 sq mi (1.43 km^{2})
  - Land: 0.55 sq mi (1.42 km^{2})
  - Water: 0 sq mi (0.00 km^{2})
- Elevation: 443 ft (135 m)

Population (2020)
  - Total: 257
  - Density: 467.2/sq mi (180.39/km^{2})
- Time zone: UTC-6 (Central (CST))
  - Summer (DST): UTC-5 (CDT)
- ZIP codes: 42036
- Area codes: 270 & 364
- GNIS feature ID: 490852

Dexter is an unincorporated community and census-designated place (CDP) in Calloway County, Kentucky, United States. As of the 2020 census, Dexter had a population of 257.

The community has had a post office since December 19, 1890.

== Demographics ==
Historical population
Census	Pop.	Note	%±
2020	257		—
U.S. Decennial Census
