= Stella, Kentucky =

Unincorporated community in Kentucky, United States

- Unincorporated community
- Location within the state of Kentucky Stella (the United States)
- Coordinates: 36°38′25″N 88°23′48″W
- Country: United States
- State: Kentucky
- County: Calloway
- Elevation: 568 ft (173 m)
- Time zone: UTC-6 (Central (CST))
  - Summer (DST): UTC-5 (CST)
- GNIS feature ID: 509123

Stella is an unincorporated community in Calloway County, Kentucky, United States. It was originally called Goshen as that was the name of the community's Methodist church. When a post office was established on February 2, 1895, it became known as Stella and was named for either the daughter of a Mr. Scarborough (who donated the land) or a Mr. Waterfield (a local store keeper). The post office closed in 1904. Some people still refer to the community as Goshen as the Methodist congregation still exists.
