= Kirksey, Kentucky =

Unincorporated community in Kentucky, United States

- Unincorporated community
- Location within the state of Kentucky Kirksey (the United States)
- Coordinates: 36°41′55″N 88°23′43″W
- Country: United States
- State: Kentucky
- County: Calloway
- Elevation: 554 ft (169 m)
- Time zone: UTC-6 (Central (CST))
  - Summer (DST): UTC-5 (CST)
- ZIP codes: 42054
- GNIS feature ID: 495803

Kirksey is an unincorporated community in Calloway County, Kentucky, United States. The post office was established on July 14, 1871, by Stephen Franklin Kirksey. Post Master Kirksey used the same building for a post office that had served as a post office from 1857 to 1860 that was known at the time as Radford, Kentucky. Post Master Kirksey submitted his own name to the U.S. Post Office instead of the names Reedville and Rosedale which were preferred by the residents in the area.
