= Calloway County, Kentucky =

County in Kentucky, United States

- County
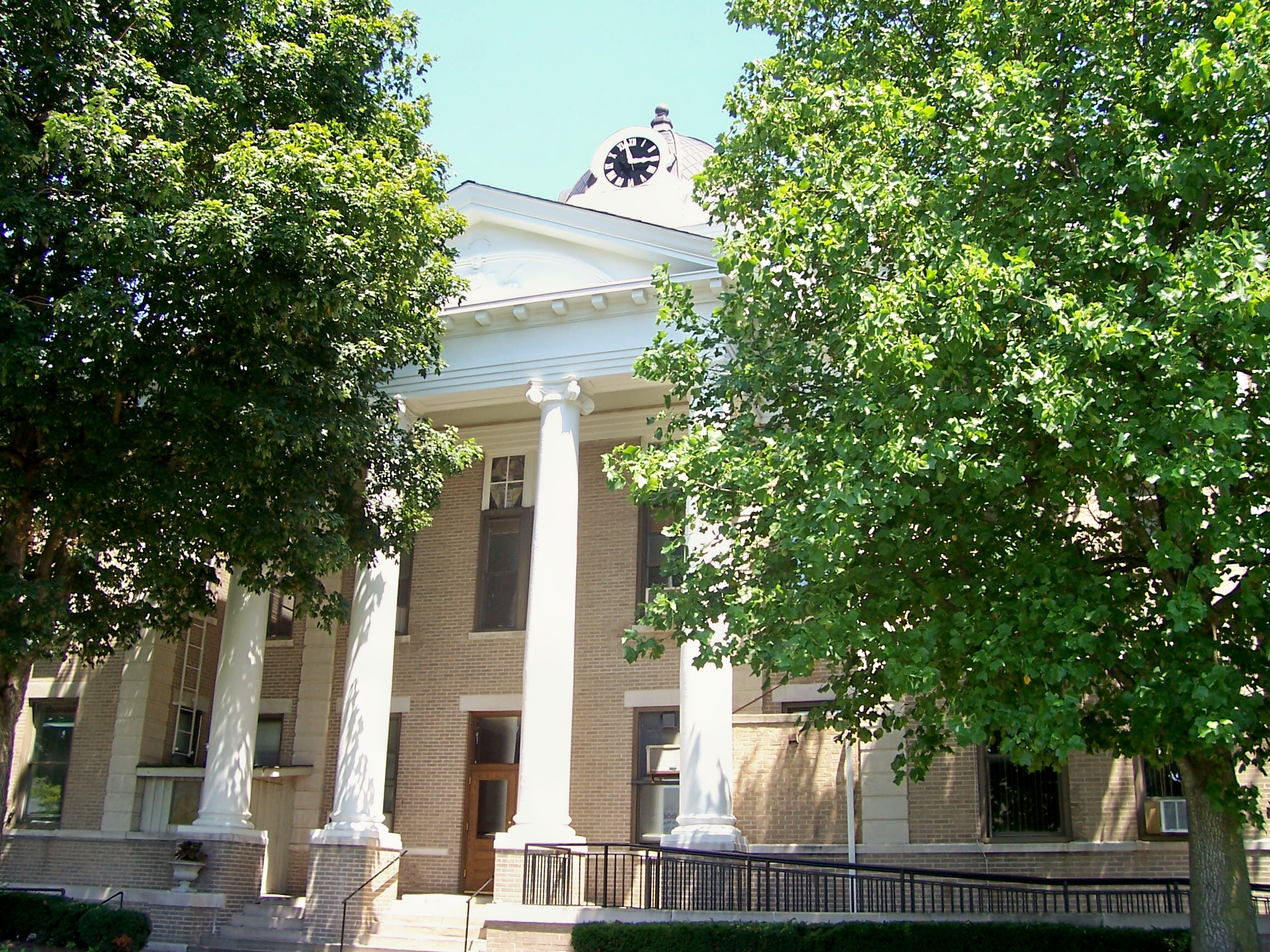
- Calloway County courthouse in Murray

- Flag Seal

- Location within the U.S. state of Kentucky
- Coordinates: 36°37′N 88°16′W
- Country: United States
- State: Kentucky
- Founded: November 3, 1822
- Named for: Richard Callaway
- Seat: Murray
- Largest city: Murray

Government
  - Judge/Executive: Kenny Imes (R)

Area
  - Total: 411 sq mi (1,060 km^{2})
  - Land: 385 sq mi (1,000 km^{2})
  - Water: 26 sq mi (67 km^{2}) 6.3%

Population (2020)
  - Total: 37,103
  - Estimate (2025): 39,421 ▲
  - Density: 96.4/sq mi (37.2/km^{2})
- Time zone: UTC−6 (Central)
  - Summer (DST): UTC−5 (CDT)
- Congressional district: 1st
- Website: callowaycountyky.gov

Calloway County is a county located on the southwest border of the U.S. Commonwealth of Kentucky. As of the 2020 census, the population was 37,103. Its county seat is Murray. The county was founded in November 1822 and named after Colonel Richard Callaway, one of the founders of Boonesborough. Calloway County comprises the Murray, KY Micropolitan Statistical Area. As of July 18, 2012, Calloway County is a moist county: the sale of alcohol in the county is prohibited, with the exception of the city of Murray.

== History ==
Calloway County was created in 1822 from land taken from Hickman County. The courthouse was built in 1823. A fire at the courthouse in 1906 caused the almost complete destruction of the county records. Calloway county was named after Richard Callaway.

== Geography ==
According to the United States Census Bureau, the county has a total area of 411 square miles (1,060 km^{2}), of which 385 square miles (1,000 km^{2}) is land and 26 square miles (67 km^{2}) (6.3%) is water.

=== Adjacent counties ===
- Marshall County (north)
- Trigg County (northeast)
- Stewart County, Tennessee (southeast)
- Henry County, Tennessee (south)
- Graves County (west)

=== National protected area ===
- Fort Donelson National Battlefield (Fort Heiman part)

== Demographics ==
Historical population
| Census | Pop. | Note | %± |
|---|---|---|---|
| 1830 | 5,164 | | — |
| 1840 | 9,794 | | 89.7% |
| 1850 | 8,096 | | −17.3% |
| 1860 | 9,915 | | 22.5% |
| 1870 | 9,410 | | −5.1% |
| 1880 | 13,295 | | 41.3% |
| 1890 | 14,675 | | 10.4% |
| 1900 | 17,633 | | 20.2% |
| 1910 | 19,867 | | 12.7% |
| 1920 | 20,802 | | 4.7% |
| 1930 | 17,662 | | −15.1% |
| 1940 | 19,041 | | 7.8% |
| 1950 | 20,147 | | 5.8% |
| 1960 | 20,972 | | 4.1% |
| 1970 | 27,692 | | 32.0% |
| 1980 | 30,031 | | 8.4% |
| 1990 | 30,735 | | 2.3% |
| 2000 | 34,177 | | 11.2% |
| 2010 | 37,191 | | 8.8% |
| 2020 | 37,103 | | −0.2% |
| 2025 (est.) | 39,421 | ▲ | 6.2% |
U.S. Decennial Census; 1790-1960 1900-1990; 1990-2000 2010-2020

=== 2020 census ===
As of the 2020 census, the county had a population of 37,103. The median age was 37.5 years. 18.3% of residents were under the age of 18 and 18.8% of residents were 65 years of age or older. For every 100 females there were 93.3 males, and for every 100 females age 18 and over there were 91.4 males age 18 and over.

The racial makeup of the county was 87.9% White, 3.5% Black or African American, 0.2% American Indian and Alaska Native, 1.2% Asian, 0.0% Native Hawaiian and Pacific Islander, 1.5% from some other race, and 5.7% from two or more races. Hispanic or Latino residents of any race comprised 3.6% of the population.

51.1% of residents lived in urban areas, while 48.9% lived in rural areas.

There were 15,108 households in the county, of which 25.1% had children under the age of 18 living with them and 28.0% had a female householder with no spouse or partner present. About 32.1% of all households were made up of individuals and 12.8% had someone living alone who was 65 years of age or older.

There were 17,874 housing units, of which 15.5% were vacant. Among occupied housing units, 64.2% were owner-occupied and 35.8% were renter-occupied. The homeowner vacancy rate was 2.0% and the rental vacancy rate was 11.2%.

=== 2000 census ===
As of the census of 2000, there were 34,177 people, 13,862 households, and 8,594 families residing in the county. The population density was 88 per square mile (34/km^{2}). There were 16,069 housing units at an average density of 42 per square mile (16/km^{2}). The racial makeup of the county was 93.48% White, 3.56% Black or African American, 0.20% Native American, 1.33% Asian, 0.03% Pacific Islander, 0.46% from other races, and 0.93% from two or more races. 1.38% of the population were Hispanic or Latino of any race.

There were 13,862 households, out of which 25.80% had children under the age of 18 living with them, 51.00% were married couples living together, 8.10% had a female householder with no husband present, and 38.00% were non-families. 29.70% of all households were made up of individuals, and 11.40% had someone living alone who was 65 years of age or older. The average household size was 2.25 and the average family size was 2.79.

The age distribution was 18.70% under the age of 18, 19.80% from 18 to 24, 24.60% from 25 to 44, 21.90% from 45 to 64, and 15.00% who were 65 years of age or older. The median age was 34 years. The relatively large 18-to-24 population is mostly due to the presence of Murray State University. For every 100 females there were 93.20 males. For every 100 females age 18 and over, there were 91.00 males.

The median income for a household in the county was $30,134, and the median income for a family was $39,914. Males had a median income of $31,184 versus $22,046 for females. The per capita income for the county was $16,566. About 9.80% of families and 16.60% of the population were below the poverty line, including 17.70% of those under age 18 and 10.00% of those age 65 or over.

== Politics ==
United States presidential election results for Calloway County, Kentucky
| Year | Republican | | Democratic | | Third party(ies) | |
| Year | No. | % | No. | % | No. | % |
|---|---|---|---|---|---|---|
| 1912 | 628 | 17.49% | 2,380 | 66.28% | 583 | 16.24% |
| 1916 | 1,026 | 22.73% | 3,334 | 73.88% | 153 | 3.39% |
| 1920 | 1,520 | 24.19% | 4,574 | 72.79% | 190 | 3.02% |
| 1924 | 936 | 19.17% | 3,790 | 77.63% | 156 | 3.20% |
| 1928 | 1,557 | 31.13% | 3,431 | 68.59% | 14 | 0.28% |
| 1932 | 813 | 11.32% | 6,335 | 88.18% | 36 | 0.50% |
| 1936 | 939 | 14.51% | 5,523 | 85.34% | 10 | 0.15% |
| 1940 | 896 | 13.38% | 5,793 | 86.49% | 9 | 0.13% |
| 1944 | 1,121 | 18.60% | 4,888 | 81.12% | 17 | 0.28% |
| 1948 | 681 | 11.82% | 4,896 | 85.01% | 182 | 3.16% |
| 1952 | 1,829 | 25.14% | 5,434 | 74.69% | 12 | 0.16% |
| 1956 | 2,292 | 27.09% | 6,152 | 72.72% | 16 | 0.19% |
| 1960 | 3,356 | 41.69% | 4,693 | 58.31% | 0 | 0.00% |
| 1964 | 1,576 | 17.74% | 7,290 | 82.04% | 20 | 0.23% |
| 1968 | 2,672 | 30.78% | 3,854 | 44.39% | 2,156 | 24.83% |
| 1972 | 5,167 | 59.17% | 3,468 | 39.72% | 97 | 1.11% |
| 1976 | 3,171 | 27.56% | 8,141 | 70.75% | 195 | 1.69% |
| 1980 | 4,498 | 37.60% | 6,809 | 56.91% | 657 | 5.49% |
| 1984 | 6,442 | 55.94% | 5,028 | 43.66% | 45 | 0.39% |
| 1988 | 6,225 | 53.91% | 5,287 | 45.79% | 34 | 0.29% |
| 1992 | 4,654 | 36.53% | 6,181 | 48.52% | 1,905 | 14.95% |
| 1996 | 4,989 | 43.14% | 5,281 | 45.66% | 1,296 | 11.21% |
| 2000 | 7,705 | 56.35% | 5,635 | 41.21% | 333 | 2.44% |
| 2004 | 9,293 | 61.36% | 5,728 | 37.82% | 124 | 0.82% |
| 2008 | 8,991 | 58.37% | 6,165 | 40.02% | 248 | 1.61% |
| 2012 | 9,440 | 62.63% | 5,317 | 35.28% | 315 | 2.09% |
| 2016 | 10,367 | 64.60% | 4,749 | 29.59% | 933 | 5.81% |
| 2020 | 11,352 | 65.03% | 5,797 | 33.21% | 308 | 1.76% |
| 2024 | 11,539 | 68.10% | 5,111 | 30.16% | 295 | 1.74% |

=== Elected officials ===
Elected officials as of January 3, 2025
| U.S. House | James Comer (R) | KY 1 |
| Ky. Senate | Jason Howell (R) | 1 |
| Ky. House | Mary Beth Imes (R) | 5 |

== Communities ==
=== Cities ===
- Hazel
- Murray

=== Census-designated place ===
- Dexter

=== Other unincorporated communities ===
- Almo
- Backusburg
- Bethel
- Blood
- Boatwright
- Coldwater
- Crossland
- Elm Grove
- Faxon
- Hamlin
- Harris Grove
- Hico
- Kirksey
- Lynn Grove
- Midway
- New Concord
- Penny
- Protemus
- Shiloh
- Stella
- Wadesboro
- Wiswell

== Place of interest ==
- Fort Heiman, part of Fort Donelson National Battlefield

== Notable people ==
- W. Earl Brown, actor/musician
- T.R.M. Howard, surgeon, civil rights leader and entrepreneur
- Joe Staton, cartoonist
- Frank Stubblefield, politician
- Nathan Stubblefield, inventor
- Harry Lee Waterfield, politician
- Molly Sims, actress/model
- Cleanth Brooks, professor, literary critic
- Mel Purcell, professional tennis player
- Jackie DeShannon, 1960s singer-songwriter
- Tim Masthay, NFL Punter, Super Bowl Champion

== See also ==
- Calloway County School District
- National Register of Historic Places listings in Calloway County, Kentucky
