= County judge/executive =

Public office in Kentucky

Party affiliation of county judge/executives as of May 2026. Republican Democratic Independent

A county judge/executive (or simply judge/executive, and often written judge-executive) is an elected official in the U.S. Commonwealth of Kentucky who is the head of the executive branch of a government in a county. The judge/executive is a member and presiding officer of the Fiscal Court, the county's legislative body. The position is established by section 140 of the Kentucky Constitution. In other states, similar positions are often titled county executive or county mayor.

== History ==
Before the Kentucky Constitution of 1850, the primary administrator of a county was the justice of the peace. The 1850 constitution provided for the office of a county judge, elected by the citizens. The county judge presided over certain county courts, most notably the court of claims, the forerunner of the fiscal court.

The fourth state constitution, enacted in 1891, reorganized county governments into much of their present form. Judicial, legislative and executive leadership was provided for in the office of the county judge. A 1975 amendment to the constitution eliminated the judicial roles of the county judge at the end of 1977, and a 1976 law changed the name of the office to county judge/executive, effective with those elected in 1977.

== Term and duties ==
The judge/executive serves a four-year term and may be re-elected indefinitely. Though the office wields no judicial power, the judge/executive is often informally referred to as "The Judge", is usually addressed as "Judge", and is styled as "The Honorable". The judge/executive is the presiding officer and a voting member of the Fiscal Court, enabling them to exercise a role in the legislative process. Newspapers usually render the title as "judge-executive" because they dislike using slashes.

In Kentucky's consolidated city-county governments, most powers assigned to the judge/executive are exercised by the Louisville metro mayor (Jefferson County) and the urban county mayor of Lexington-Fayette County. These counties retain, and fill by election, the constitutional office of judge/executive, which retains some minor authorities in those counties.
