= Kenlake State Resort Park =

Park on the western shore of Kentucky Lake

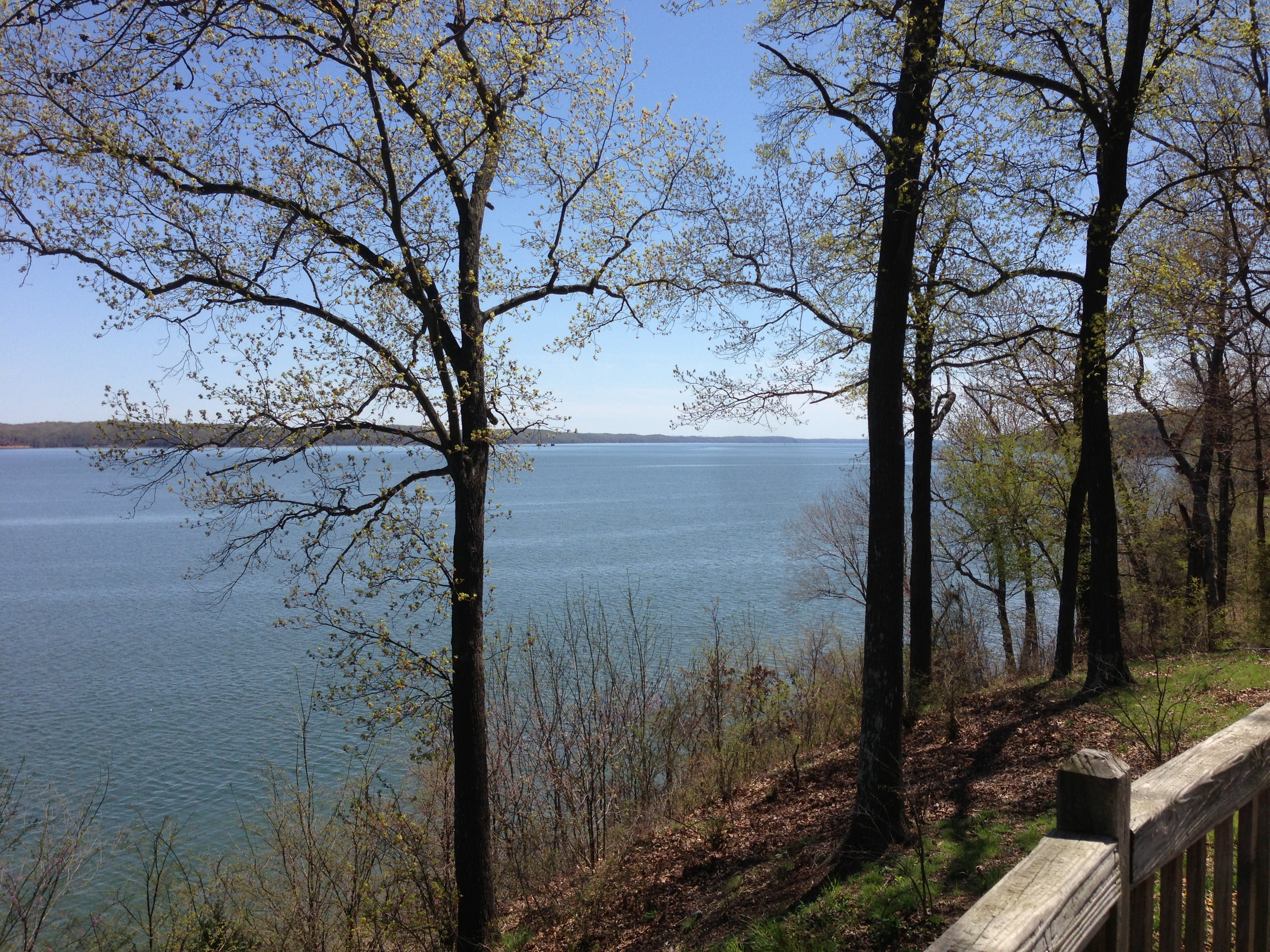
- Kentucky Lake, Kenlake State Resort Park, April 2013

- Location within Kentucky Location within the United States
- Type: Kentucky state park
- Location: Calloway and Marshall Counties, Kentucky, USA
- Nearest city: Hardin, Kentucky
- Coordinates: 36°46′13″N 88°08′03″W
- Area: 162,095 acres (65,598 ha)
- Established: March 13, 1948
- Operator: Kentucky Department of Parks
- Website: Official website

Kenlake State Resort Park is a park located on the western shore of Kentucky Lake. The park's main entrance and most of its facilities are located in Marshall County; the park also extends into Calloway County. The mailing address of the park is Hardin, Kentucky; however, it is located much closer to the unincorporated community of Aurora, Kentucky. The nearest town of substantial size is Murray. The park encompasses 1,795 acres (726 ha) of land, 160,300 acres (64,900 ha) of water, and features climate-controlled indoor tennis courts. It was Kentucky's first state resort park. Along with Lake Barkley State Resort Park and Kentucky Dam Village State Resort Park, Kenlake State Resort Park is part of the Land Between the Lakes National Recreation Area, originally organized by the Great Depression–era Tennessee Valley Authority (TVA).

== History ==
The Commonwealth of Kentucky began negotiations with the TVA in 1946 to lease a portion of land known as Aurora Landing. The land was situated on the western shore of Kentucky Lake near the Eggner's Ferry Bridge. Kentucky Lake had just opened, following completion of the Kentucky Dam in 1944. The new lake, created by the dam on the Tennessee River, had the most beach area of any man-made lake in the world. The leased land would be used as a state park dedicated to recreation. The TVA leased an initial 1,146 acres to Kentucky. After the land transfer was officially completed on March 13, 1948, the new park at Aurora Landing was named Kentucky Lake State Park and joined the commonwealth's state parks system. By the 1970s, the name of the park was often shortened to "Kenlake State Park" rather than "Kentucky Lake State Park".

=== Kenlake Hotel ===
In 1950, fifteen vacation cottages were opened in Kentucky Lake State Park, and plans were announced to construct a hotel inside the new Kentucky Lake State Park. The Kenlake Hotel was constructed at a cost of $600,000, and it opened in Spring 1952. The hotel originally had 60 guest rooms, each with twin beds and private bathrooms.

The Kenlake Hotel is now a 48-room hotel, and it is one of just a few Kentucky State Parks that has interior room doors. The property also includes 34 cottages, some of which belonged originally to the defunct Cherokee State Park, which was nearby. A 90-site camping-ground is also available for overnight stays.

=== Cherokee State Park ===
Kenlake State Resort Park contains an area that was originally known as Cherokee State Park. Cherokee State Park was the third blacks-only state park in the United States. It was the first such state park in Kentucky, as well as the Southern United States. The park was opened in 1951 as the companion to the whites-only Kentucky Lake State Park, and it was publicized as "the finest colored vacation site in the South". The park was originally 300 acres, and it included a beach, cottages, boat and fishing docks, a picnic area, a bathhouse, and a 200-seat dining hall. It was designed to provide the same standards as Kentucky Lake State Park under the separate but equal doctrine. Cherokee State Park was closed by 1964 after Governor Bert T. Combs signed the executive order ending segregation in 1963. The land was transferred to the control of Kentucky Lake State Park.

The Cherokee State Park area remained abandoned for many years until it was cleaned up and re-purposed for use by the Murray State University rowing team. The university leased the park area and used some remaining structures to establish a boathouse and a trophy room as Murray State began NCAA level rowing competition in 1998. The university later cut the rowing program in 2008. The former park and the remaining structures were placed on the National Register of Historic Places in 2009. The former Cherokee State Park dining hall was renovated and reopened in Fall 2010 as a meeting and event facility. The renovated dining hall is now known as the Richard H. Lewis Lodge.

== Park Activities ==
There are several activities available at the park. Fishing is a popular pastime; crappie are the most popular fish at the park, with bluegill, catfish, sauger, and various types of bass also available. Two trails, named Chickasaw and Cherokee, total 1.7 miles (2.7 km) of hiking trails at the park. It is also the premier place in Kentucky for big boat sailing.

=== Blues Festival ===
Kenlake State Resort Park has been home to the Hot August Blues Festival every summer since 1989. The blues festival, originally started by then Kenlake sales manager Gloria Hargrove, takes place at the Kenlake Amphitheater. Blues legend Junior Wells played the inaugural 1989 festival. Other artists to play the festival have included KoKo Taylor, Clarence "Gatemouth" Brown, Lew Jetton, and Chris Cain. The festival was named one of Kentucky's top ten summer events by the Kentucky Tourism Council in 2007.
