= Kuttawa, Kentucky =

- City
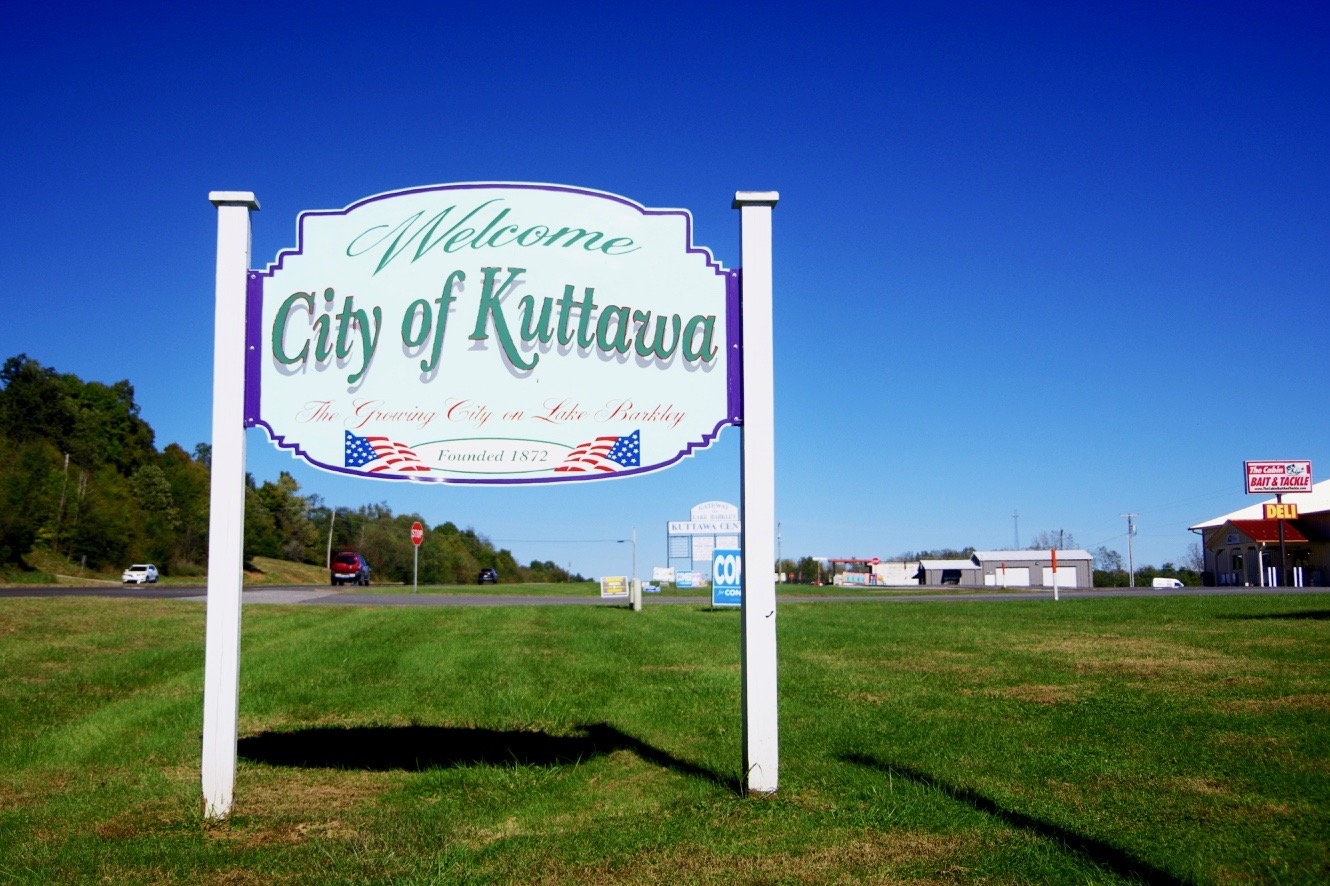
- Welcome sign in Kuttawa

- Location in Lyon County, Kentucky
- Coordinates: 37°03′34″N 88°06′54″W
- Country: United States
- State: Kentucky
- County: Lyon
- Incorporated: 1872
- Named for: a Cherokee village

Area
  - Total: 3.02 sq mi (7.81 km^{2})
  - Land: 2.19 sq mi (5.67 km^{2})
  - Water: 0.83 sq mi (2.14 km^{2})
- Elevation: 463 ft (141 m)

Population (2020)
  - Total: 629
  - Density: 287.5/sq mi (111.02/km^{2})
- Time zone: UTC-6 (Central (CST))
  - Summer (DST): UTC-5 (CDT)
- ZIP code: 42055
- Area code: 270
- FIPS code: 21-43264
- GNIS feature ID: 2404844
- Website: kuttawa.ky.gov

Kuttawa locally /kəˈtɑːwə/ is a home rule-class city in Lyon County, Kentucky, United States. As of the 2020 census, Kuttawa had a population of 629.

== History ==
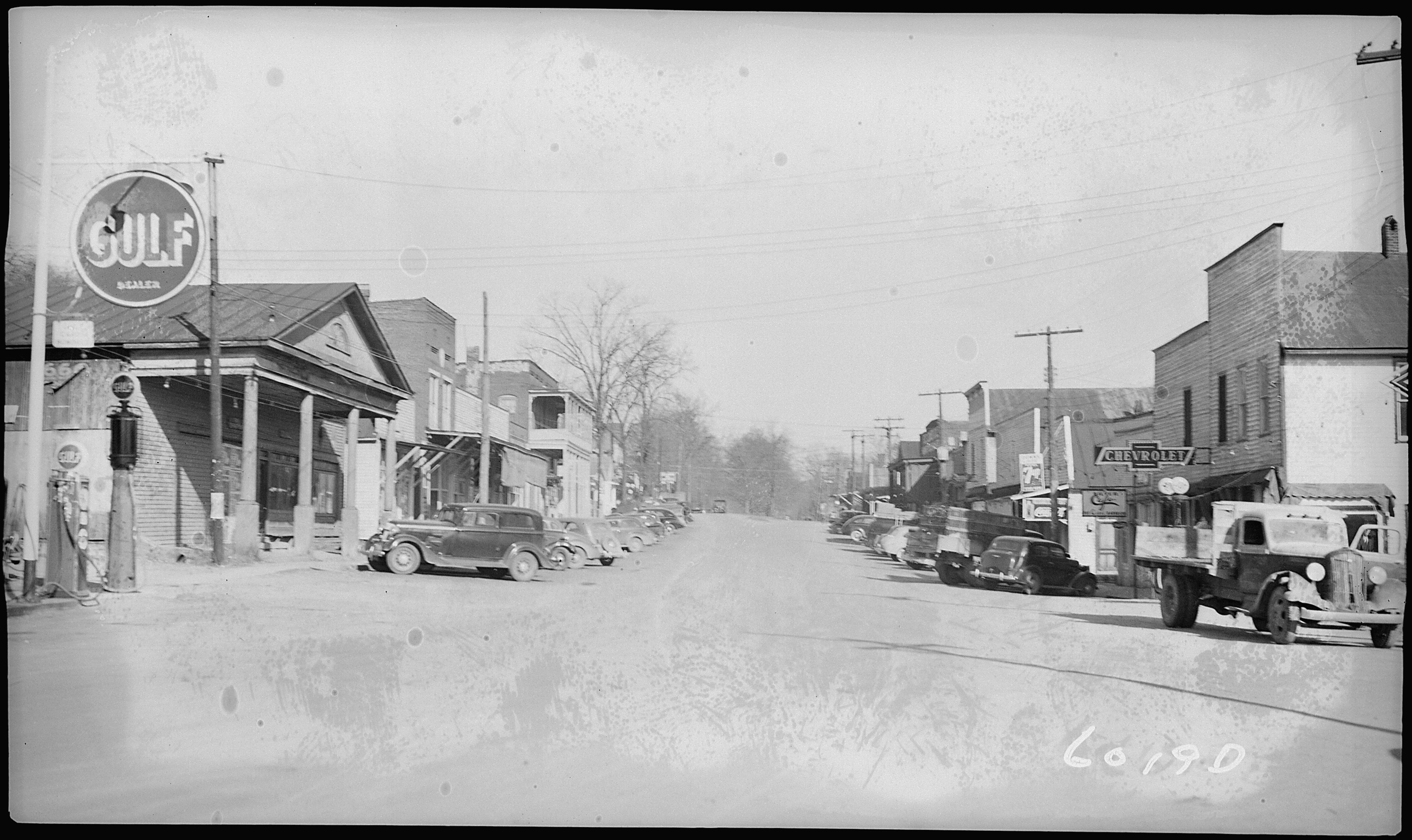
Kuttawa in 1939

Former Ohio governor Charles Anderson founded the town on land he purchased in 1866. Originally spelled "Cuttawa" and "Kittawa", Kuttawa seems to have been the name of a Cherokee village near the site, whose meaning is a matter of dispute: it has been variously translated as "beautiful", "city in the woods", and "great wilderness". The city was formally incorporated by the state assembly in 1872, the same year it received its post office.

In the early 1960s, the Tennessee Valley Authority constructed a dam across the Cumberland River at Grand Rivers, forming Lake Barkley. Eddyville and Kuttawa were both moved from their original locations owing to the impounded lake.

== Geography ==
Kuttawa is located in north-central Lyon County and is bordered to the east by Eddyville and to the south by Lake Barkley, an impoundment of the Cumberland River, just upstream from Barkley Dam. The city is concentrated primarily in an area adjacent to the western intersection of U.S. Route 62 and Kentucky Route 295, though its municipal boundaries extend southwestward along US 62 and Kentucky Route 810, northeastward to the intersection of US 62 and the merged Interstate 24/Interstate 69, and along KY 295 as it follows the lakeshore to its eastern intersection with US 62.

The Land Between the Lakes National Recreation Area lies along the lakeshore opposite Kuttawa. Mineral Mound State Park borders the city to the east. Both Barkley Dam and Kentucky Dam (the latter of which impounds the Tennessee River) are located southwest of Kuttawa. By highway, Kuttawa is 32 miles (51 km) east of Paducah, 42 miles (68 km) northwest of Hopkinsville, and 46 miles (74 km) southwest of Madisonville.

According to the United States Census Bureau, the city of Kuttawa has a total area of 3.0 square miles (7.8 km^{2}), of which 2.2 square miles (5.7 km^{2}) are land and 0.81 square miles (2.1 km^{2}), or 27.40%, are water.

== Demographics ==
Historical population
Census	Pop.	Note	%±
1880	294		—
1890	587		99.7%
1900	858		46.2%
1910	889		3.6%
1920	850		−4.4%
1930	883		3.9%
1940	1,125		27.4%
1950	794		−29.4%
1960	635		−20.0%
1970	453		−28.7%
1980	560		23.6%
1990	535		−4.5%
2000	596		11.4%
2010	649		8.9%
2020	629		−3.1%
U.S. Decennial Census

As of the census of 2000, there were 596 people, 220 households, and 157 families residing in the city. The population density was 307.1 inhabitants per square mile (118.6/km^{2}). There were 317 housing units at an average density of 163.3 per square mile (63.1/km^{2}). The racial makeup of the city was 96.14% White, 2.52% African American, 0.84% Native American, and 0.50% from two or more races.

There were 220 households, of which 24.1% had children under the age of 18 living with them, 62.7% were married couples living together, 5.5% had a female householder with no husband present, and 28.2% were non-families. 26.4% of all households were made up of individuals, and 14.1% had someone living alone who was 65 years of age or older. The average household size was 2.20 and the average family size was 2.61.

In the city the population was spread out, with 14.1% under the age of 18, 4.5% from 18 to 24, 18.3% from 25 to 44, 26.2% from 45 to 64, and 36.9% who were 65 years of age or older. The median age was 55 years. For every 100 females, there were 70.8 males. For every 100 females age 18 and over, there were 68.4 males.

The median income for a household in the city was $45,357, and the median income for a family was $55,208. Males had a median income of $48,571 versus $31,375 for females. The per capita income for the city was $21,355. About 5.6% of families and 7.7% of the population were below the poverty line, including 11.9% of those under age 18 and 7.0% of those age 65 or over.

== Climate ==
The climate in this area is characterized by hot, humid summers and generally mild to cool winters. According to the Köppen Climate Classification system, Kuttawa has a humid subtropical climate, abbreviated "Cfa" on climate maps.

== Education ==
The county's school district is Lyon County School District.

== Notable people ==
- Bill Cunningham, former associate justice of the Kentucky Supreme Court
- Joe Cunningham, former member of the United States House of Representatives from South Carolina's 1st congressional district
- Keen Johnson, 45th Governor of Kentucky from 1939 to 1943
