= Gilbertsville, Kentucky =

Census-designated place in Kentucky, United States

- Census-designated place
- Location within Kentucky Location within the United States
- Coordinates: 37°01′42″N 88°18′37″W
- Country: United States
- State: Kentucky
- County: Marshall

Area
  - Total: 1.04 sq mi (2.70 km^{2})
  - Land: 1.01 sq mi (2.62 km^{2})
  - Water: 0.027 sq mi (0.07 km^{2})
- Elevation: 345 ft (105 m)

Population (2020)
  - Total: 332
  - Density: 327.8/sq mi (126.57/km^{2})
- Time zone: UTC-6 (Central (CST))
  - Summer (DST): UTC-5 (CST)
- ZIP codes: 42044 (Gilbertsville); 42029 (Calvert City)
- FIPS code: 21-30880
- GNIS feature ID: 2629621

Gilbertsville is a census-designated place and unincorporated community in Marshall County, Kentucky, United States. It is the closest village to the Kentucky Dam. The town was relocated to its present site when Kentucky Dam and Kentucky Dam Village State Resort Park replaced the former site. As of the 2020 census, the population of Gilbertsville was 332.

== History ==
=== Old Gilbertsville ===
The original town of Gilbertsville was founded in 1871 near the Tennessee River as "Clear Pond", named for a nearby lake. In 1874 it was incorporated and renamed "Gilbertsville" in honor of Jesse C. Gilbert, who served as a Kentucky state senator from 1871 to 1875. The town grew to include a bank, several stores, a jail, and a school teaching grades 1–12. It had a population of approximately 300 in 1930. The village thrived because besides the fertile bottomland, it afforded the combination of river access for transportation and fishing, and railroad transportation via the Illinois Central Railroad.

=== Modern Gilbertsville ===
The construction of Kentucky Dam (1938–1944) meant the end for old Gilbertsville. The town was moved to its present site, initially called "West Gilbertsville", with the geographic coordinates given above, by the time Kentucky Lake was impounded in the early 1940s. A notable event in the town's history was the dedication ceremony for Kentucky Dam on October 10, 1945, at which President Harry Truman gave the dedicatory speech. Gilbertsville was a 6th class city from 1956 to 1976. The town incorporated at its new site circa 1953. The town later abandoned its incorporated status in 1976 by a referendum. Before dissolving its charter, the town of 241 had a budget of $2,000 to $3,000 per year, which paid for a town marshal, street lights, and street repairs.

Tourism related to the dams and lakes created nearby by TVA has driven the economy of Gilbertsville since the 1940s. The town has an airport, an 18-hole golf course, a large marina, a car racing track, and has been the site of bass fishing tournaments. The town has been the site, for several decades, of the 25-acre (100,000 m^{2}) Kentucky Sheriff's Boys and Girls Ranch, which has provided a free week-long summer camp for children ages 8–11, with total attendance of 30,000 through 2008.

== Geography ==
Gilbertsville is in northern Marshall County, on the south side of the valley of the Tennessee River. It is less than 2 miles (3 km) downstream from (northwest of) the Kentucky Dam, forming Kentucky Lake. Between Gilbertsville and the dam is Kentucky Dam Village State Park.

Interstate 24/69 passes the southeast end of the community, with access from Exit 27 (U.S. Route 62) 2 miles (3 km) to the southwest. Kentucky Route 282 (Gilbertsville Highway) passes through the town center, leading south two miles to US 62 and 641 at the west end of Kentucky Dam and west 3 miles (5 km) to Calvert City.

According to the U.S. Census Bureau, the Gilbertsville CDP has a total area of 1.05 square miles (2.72 km^{2}), of which 0.03 square miles (0.08 km^{2}), or 2.68%, are water.

== Demographics ==
Historical population
Census	Pop.	Note	%±
2020	332		—
U.S. Decennial Census

== Climate ==
The climate in this area is characterized by hot, humid summers and generally mild to cool winters. According to the Köppen climate classification system, Gilbertsville has a humid subtropical climate, abbreviated "Cfa" on climate maps.

== Annual events ==
- Arts and Crafts Festival—Every Memorial Day Weekend the festival is located at the Old Beach Area and features handcrafted items by artists from Kentucky and neighboring states.
- Earth Day Celebration—Located at the Kentucky Dam Village Resort, the festival features activities to celebrate Earth Day.
