= Gilbertsville =

Gilbertsville may refer to:

- Gilbertsville, New York
- Gilbertsville, Pennsylvania
- Gilbertsville, Kentucky

== See also ==
- Gilbertville, Iowa
