= Cherokee State Park =

Cherokee State Park can refer to

- Cherokee State Park (Kentucky)
- Cherokee State Park (Oklahoma)
