= Senator Gilbert =

Senator Gilbert may refer to:

- Abijah Gilbert (1806–1881), U.S. Senator from Florida
- George G. Gilbert (1849–1909), Kentucky State Senate
- H. C. Gilbert (1863–1939), Arizona State Senate
- Jacob H. Gilbert (1920–1981), New York State Senate
- Jesse C. Gilbert (1831–1894), Kentucky State Senate
- John I. Gilbert (1837–1904), New York State Senate
- Judson Gilbert II (born 1952), Michigan State Senate
- Newton W. Gilbert (1862–1939), Indiana State Senate
- Philip H. Gilbert (1870–1932), Louisiana State Senate
- Ralph Waldo Emerson Gilbert (1882–1939), Kentucky State Senate

== See also ==
- Larry Gilbertz (1929–2011), Idaho State Senate
