= Cherokee State Park (Kentucky) =

- U.S. National Register of Historic Places
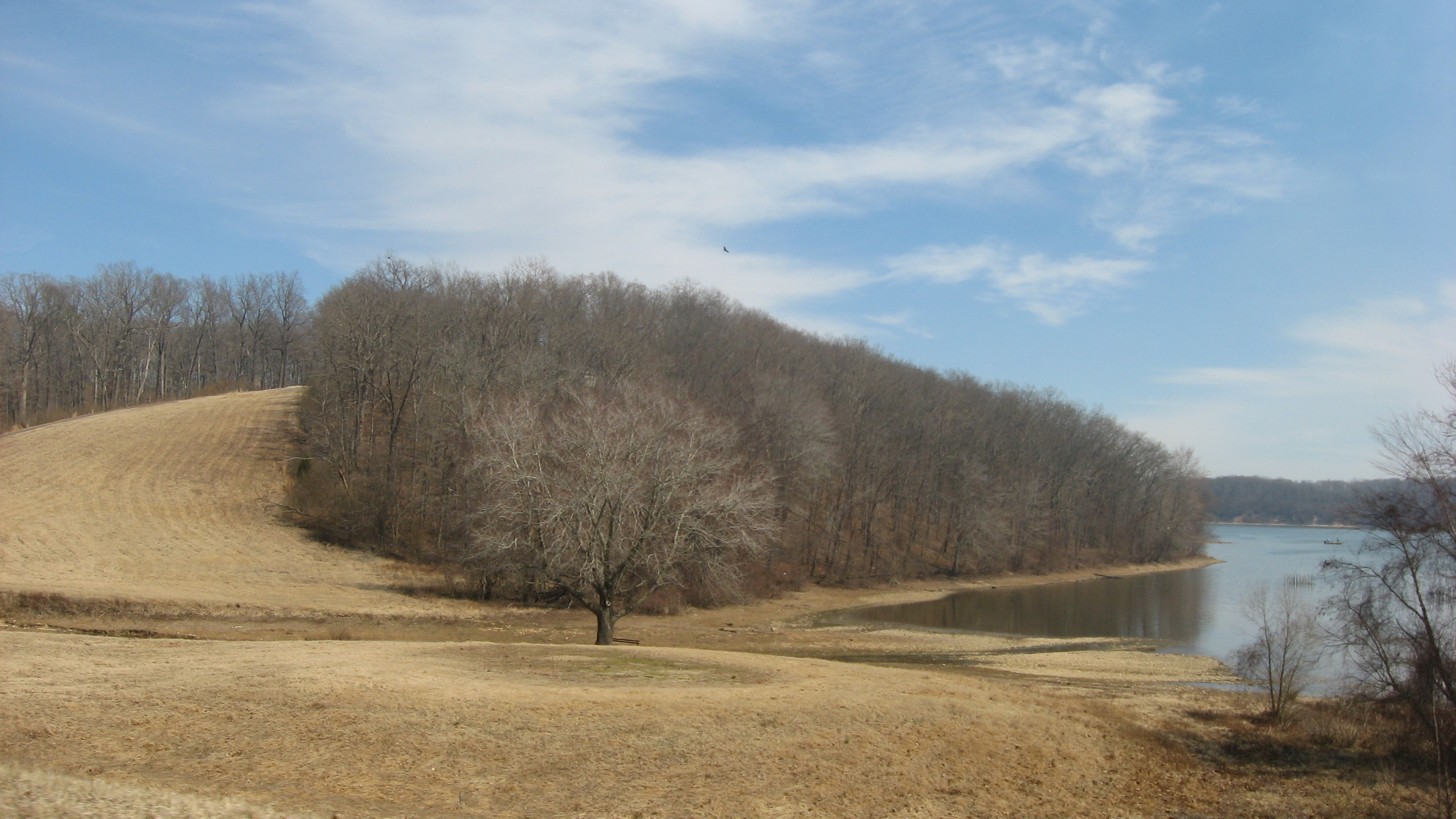
- Land on the park's western edge
- Location: Aurora, Kentucky
- Area: 300 acres (1.2 km^{2})
- Built: 1951
- NRHP reference No.: 08001120
- Added to NRHP: January 9, 2009

Cherokee State Park was a blacks-only state park located in Marshall County, Kentucky, near Hardin, Kentucky. It was a complement to the then-whites-only Kentucky Lake State Park (now Kenlake State Resort Park), which was nearby. It was built by the Tennessee Valley Authority, which went along with the concept of the "separate but equal" doctrine. The TVA gave the state of Kentucky a nineteen-year lease, and promised to give Kentucky the area when it proved it could support the park. In its time it was dubbed "the finest colored vacation site in the South." This sentiment was echoed in a 1952 Kentucky state map.

Opened in 1951, Cherokee State Park was the third blacks-only state park and the first such state park in Kentucky and the Southern United States. It was the only blacks-only state park Kentucky had.

With a size of 300 acres (1.2 km^{2}), Cherokee State Park had several amenities. These included a 200-person dining hall (1953), docks for fishing and boating, picnicking, a bathhouse for the lake's beach, and a restaurant. There was also twelve cottages (1953) for overnight lodging. It drew visitors from Western Kentucky, Southern Illinois, and Northern Kentucky. Sand often had to be brought in to keep the beach usable, as it was rocky in nature.

With the desegregation movements in the 1960s, Cherokee State Park was closed, and its cottages moved to Kenlake. In 1998 the sculling team of nearby Murray State University used the property to highlight its many rewards, but did nothing to note its history. It is now part of Kenlake State Resort Park. Few of the original buildings remain, but there are plans to reopen the area.

On January 9, 2009, it was listed on the National Register of Historic Places.

== See also ==
- Separate but equal
