= Lake Barkley State Resort Park =

State park in Kentucky, United States

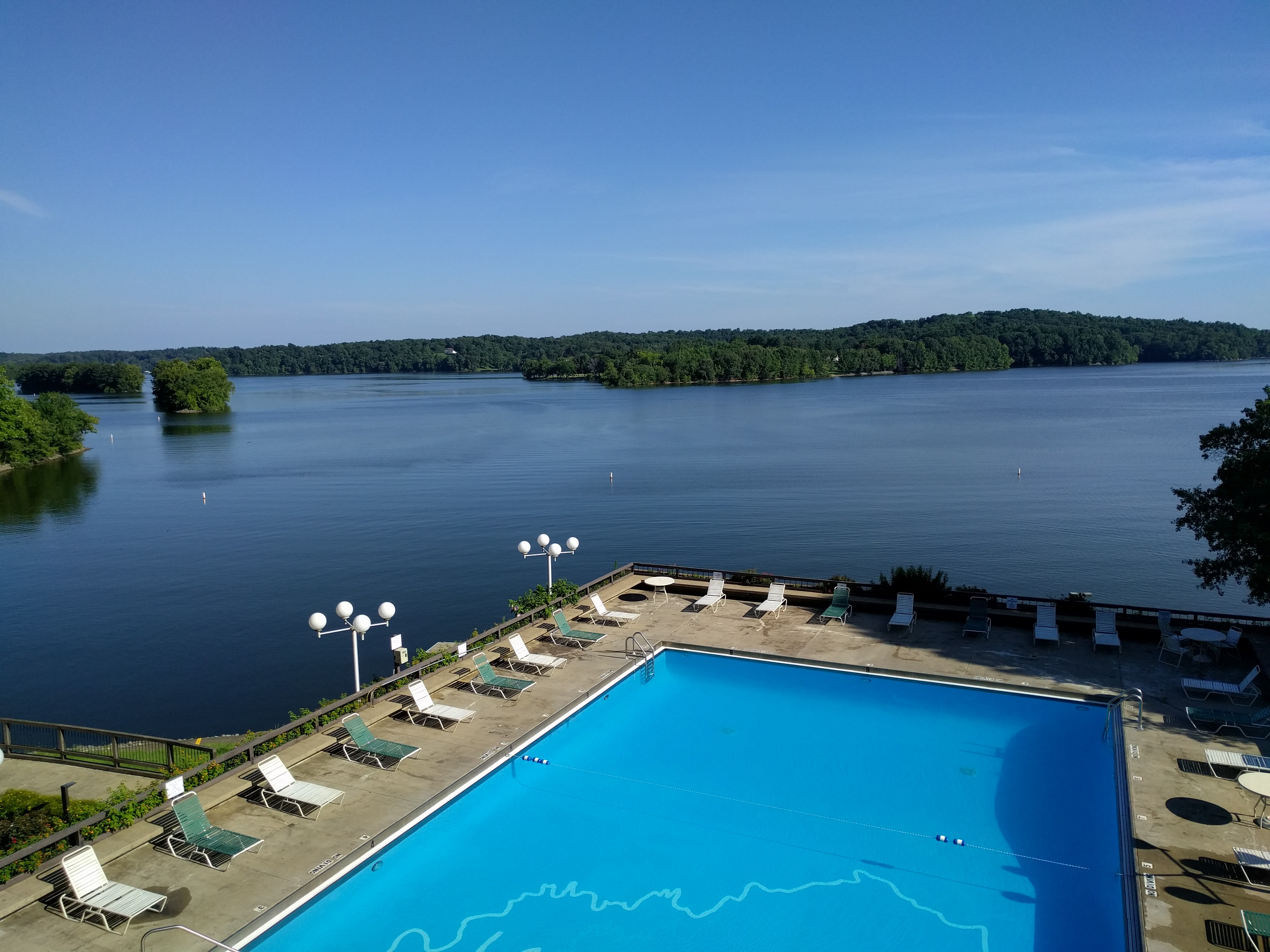

- Location within Kentucky Location within the United States
- Type: Kentucky state park
- Location: Trigg County, Kentucky, United States
- Coordinates: 36°50′01″N 87°55′08″W
- Area: 3,700 acres (1,500 ha)
- Established: 1964
- Administrator: Kentucky Department of Parks
- Website: Official website

Lake Barkley State Resort Park is a public recreation area on the eastern shore of Lake Barkley, five miles (8.0 km) west of Cadiz in Trigg County, Kentucky, United States. The state park is one of three Kentucky parks near Land Between the Lakes, a 170,000-acre (69,000 ha) isthmus between Kentucky Lake and Lake Barkley.
