= Aurora, Kentucky =

Unincorporated community in Kentucky, United States

Coordinates: 36°46′36″N 88°08′39″W

Aurora is an unincorporated community in Marshall County, Kentucky, United States. Aurora is located near Kentucky Lake and the Land Between the Lakes National Recreation Area. It becomes a popular tourist attraction area during the summer having several hotels, campgrounds, small restaurants, and a few surrounding stores. Aurora hosts two annual festivities: the Hot August Blues Festival and The Aurora Country Festival, the latter of which is a three-day celebration in October that consists of arts and crafts, a parade, and an antique flea market.
