= Barkley Dam =

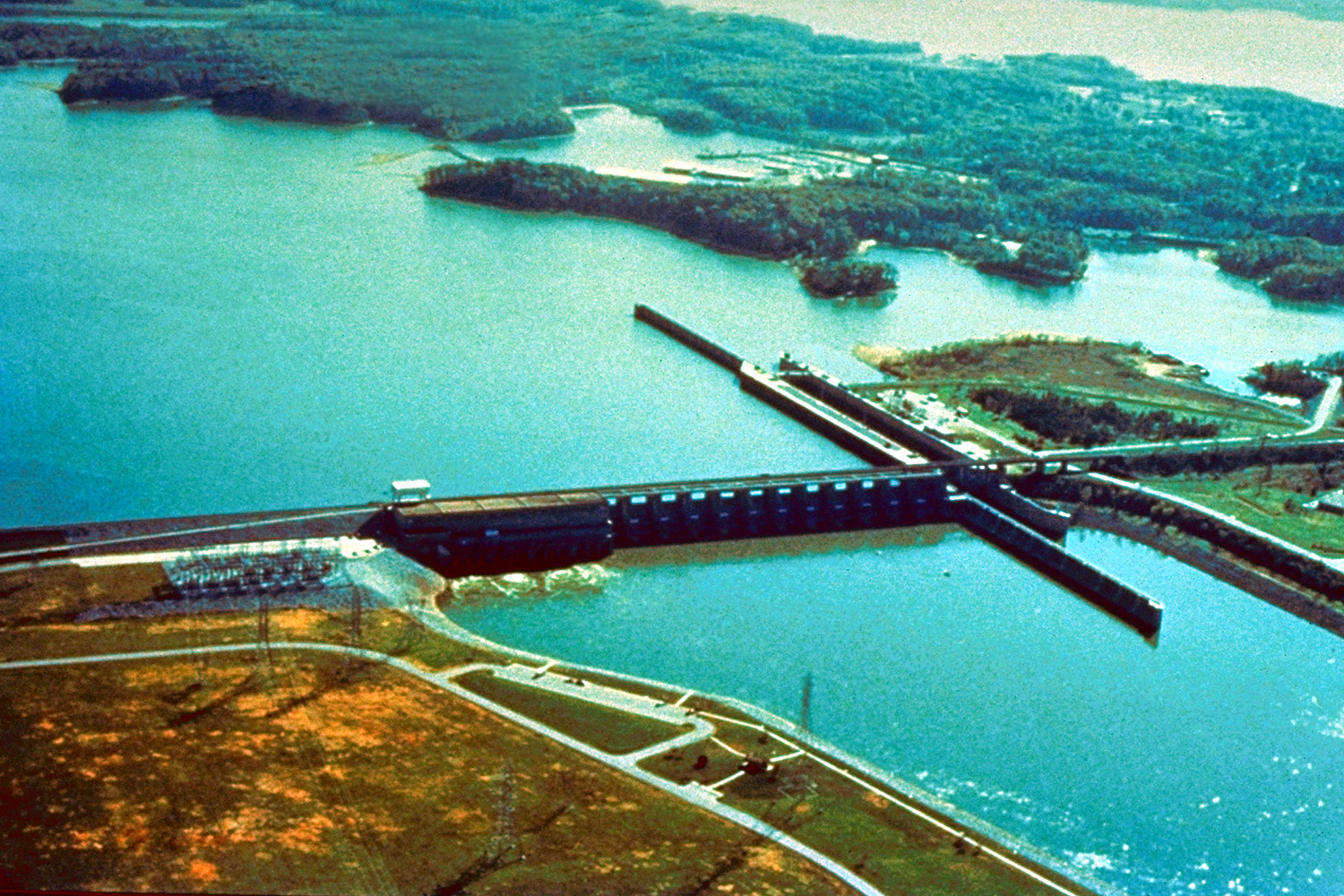
- Interactive map of Barkley Dam
- Country: United States
- Location: Kentucky
- Coordinates: 37°01′14″N 88°13′25″W
- Opening date: 1966

Dam and spillways
- Impounds: Cumberland River
- Height (thalweg): 157 ft (48 m)

Reservoir
- Creates: Lake Barkley

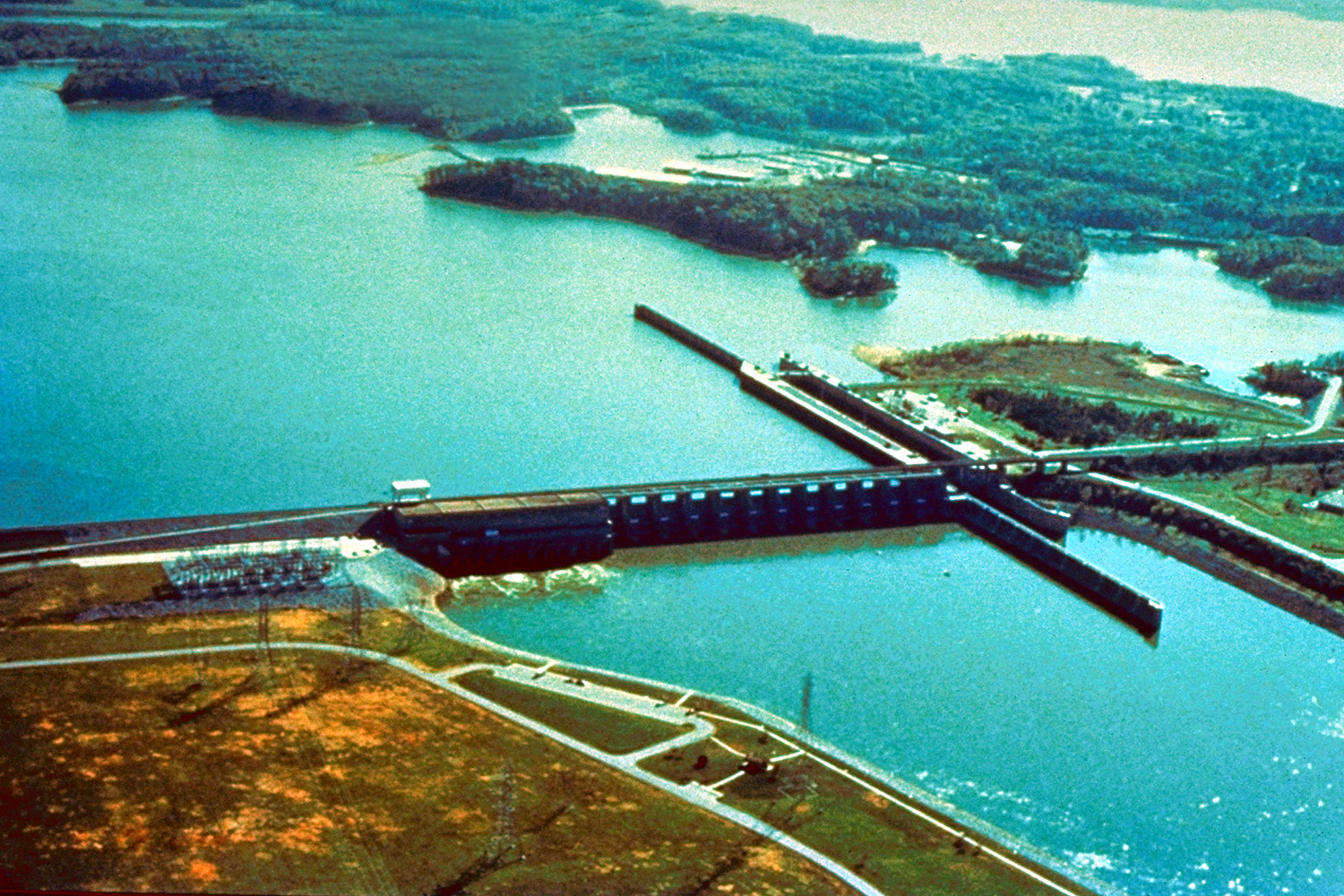
Lake Barkley Lock and Dam, impounding Lake Barkley

Barkley Dam is a dam along the Cumberland River in Kentucky. Its construction along with Kentucky Dam formed the Land Between the Lakes National Recreation Area (LBLNRA) by stopping the flow of the Cumberland and Tennessee Rivers, forming Lake Barkley and Kentucky Lake respectively. It is operated by the United States Army Corps of Engineers.

Barkley Dam is 157 feet (48 m) high and impounds a maximum of 2,082,000 acre-feet (2.6 cubic kilometers). Completed in 1966, the dam and artificial lake were both named for U.S. vice president Alben Barkley.

Electricity from the dam is marketed by the Southeastern Power Administration.
