= Kentucky Dam =

Hydroelectric dam near Gilbertsville, Kentucky, United States

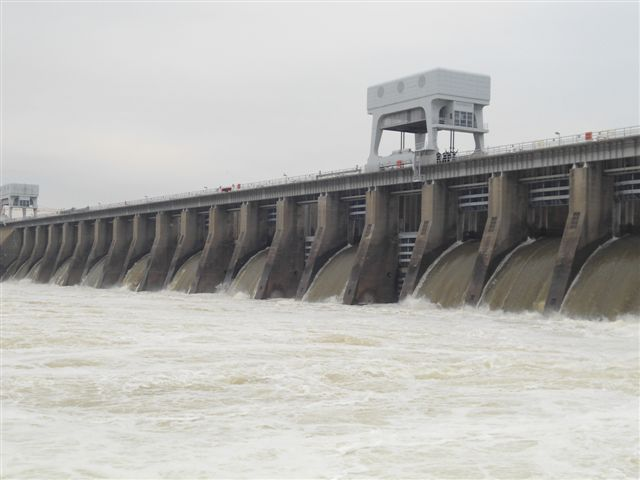
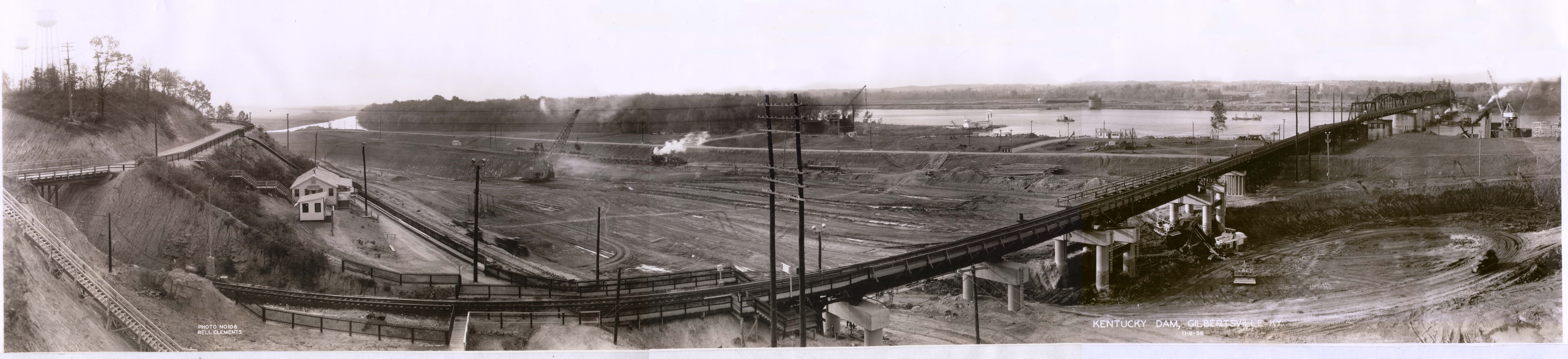
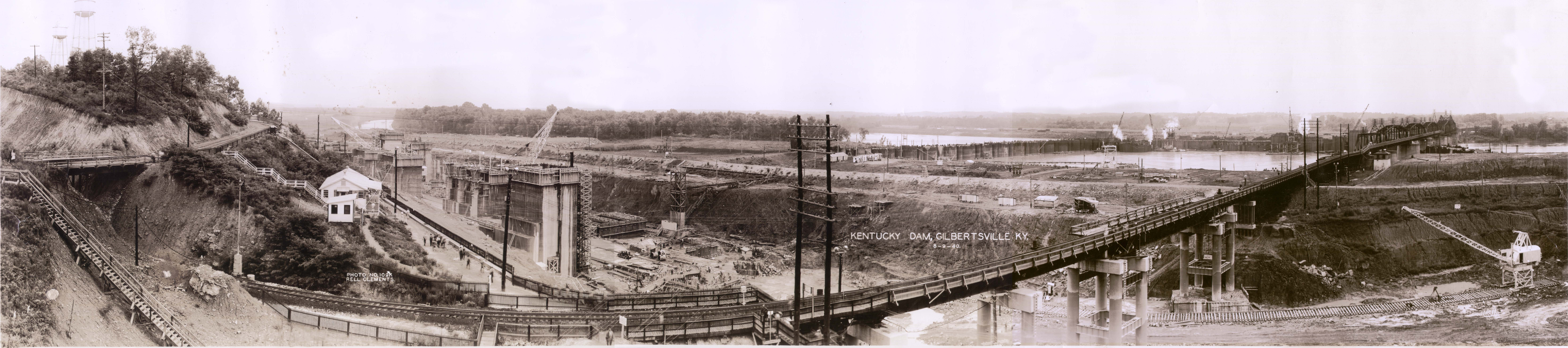
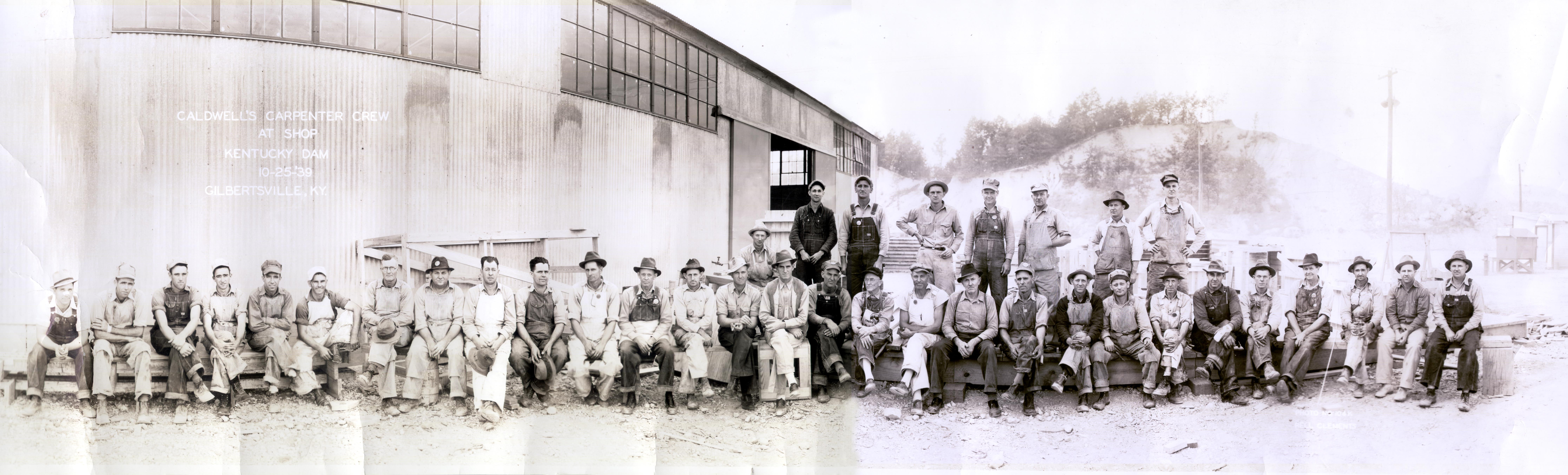
- Kentucky Dam, with gates open Construction of the dam Construction of the dam Kentucky Dam 10-25-1939 Gilbertsville, Kentucky
- Interactive map of Kentucky Dam
- Official name: Kentucky Dam
- Location: Livingston County and Marshall County, Kentucky, U.S.
- Coordinates: 37°00′47″N 88°16′09″W
- Construction began: May 1, 1938
- Opening date: August 30, 1944
- Operator: Tennessee Valley Authority

Dam and spillways
- Impounds: Tennessee River
- Height: 206 ft (63 m)
- Length: 8,422 ft (2,567 m)

Reservoir
- Creates: Kentucky Lake

Kentucky Dam is a hydroelectric dam on the Tennessee River on the county line between Livingston and Marshall counties in the U.S. state of Kentucky. The dam is the lowermost of nine dams on the river owned and operated by the Tennessee Valley Authority, which built the dam in the late 1930s and early 1940s to improve navigation on the lower part of the river and reduce flooding on the lower Ohio and Mississippi rivers. It was a major project initiated during the New Deal of President Franklin D. Roosevelt's administration, to invest in infrastructure to benefit the country. The dam impounds the Kentucky Lake of 160,000 acres (65,000 ha), which is the largest of TVA's reservoirs and the largest artificial lake by area in the Eastern United States. It was designated as an National Historic Civil Engineering Landmark by the American Society of Civil Engineers in 1996 and listed on the National Register of Historic Places in 2017.

A canal connects Kentucky Lake to nearby Lake Barkley, created by Barkley Dam on the Cumberland River. The lakes run parallel for more than 50 miles (80 km), with the Land Between the Lakes National Recreation Area located between them.

== Location ==
Kentucky Dam is located slightly more than 22 miles (35 km) above the mouth of the Tennessee River, which empties into the Ohio River at Paducah, Kentucky. After absorbing the Tennessee, the Ohio flows for another 46 miles (74 km) before emptying into the Mississippi River at Cairo, Illinois. The dam is approximately 20 miles (32 km) north of the Kentucky-Tennessee border and 10 miles (16 km) southeast of the Kentucky-Illinois border. The city of Grand Rivers is located southeast of the dam, and Gilbertsville and Calvert City are immediately downstream. Kentucky Lake stretches southward for 184 miles (296 km) across Kentucky and most of the length of Tennessee to the base of Pickwick Landing Dam, near the Tennessee-Alabama line. It is within parts of Livingston, Marshall, Lyon, Calloway, and Trigg counties in Kentucky and parts of Humphreys, Benton, Decatur, Stewart, Carroll, Wayne, Henderson, Henry, Perry, Houston, and Hardin counties in Tennessee.

Barkley Dam, which is operated by the U.S. Army Corps of Engineers, is located along the Cumberland River just opposite Lake City a few miles east of Kentucky Dam. The canal connecting Kentucky and Barkley lakes joins Kentucky Lake approximately 3 miles (4.8 km) upstream from Kentucky Dam.

== Capacity ==
Kentucky Dam is 206 feet (63 m) high; more than half the dam is submerged by water. At 8,422 feet (2,567 m) long, Kentucky Dam is the longest dam on the Tennessee River and the longest in the TVA system. The dam has a generating capacity of 223,100 kilowatts, and its 24-bay spillway has a total discharge of 1,050,000 cubic feet per second (30,000 m^{3}/s). Kentucky Lake's 2,064 miles (3,322 km) of shoreline, 160,300 acres (64,900 ha) of water surface, and 4,008,000 acre-feet (4,944 Gl) of flood storage are the most of any lake in the TVA system and one of the largest artificial lakes in the U.S.

Kentucky Dam is served by a 600-by-110-foot (183 by 34 m) navigation lock, soon to be supplemented by a larger 1,200-by-110-foot (366 by 34 m) lock which will be better able to accommodate the long barge tows that navigate the river in the 21st century. A large industrial complex of chemical plants has developed below the dam near Calvert City due to the convenient barge transportation and inexpensive TVA electricity. The locks' lift raises and lowers vessels up to 75 feet (23 m) between Kentucky Lake and the lower part of the river.

== Background and construction ==
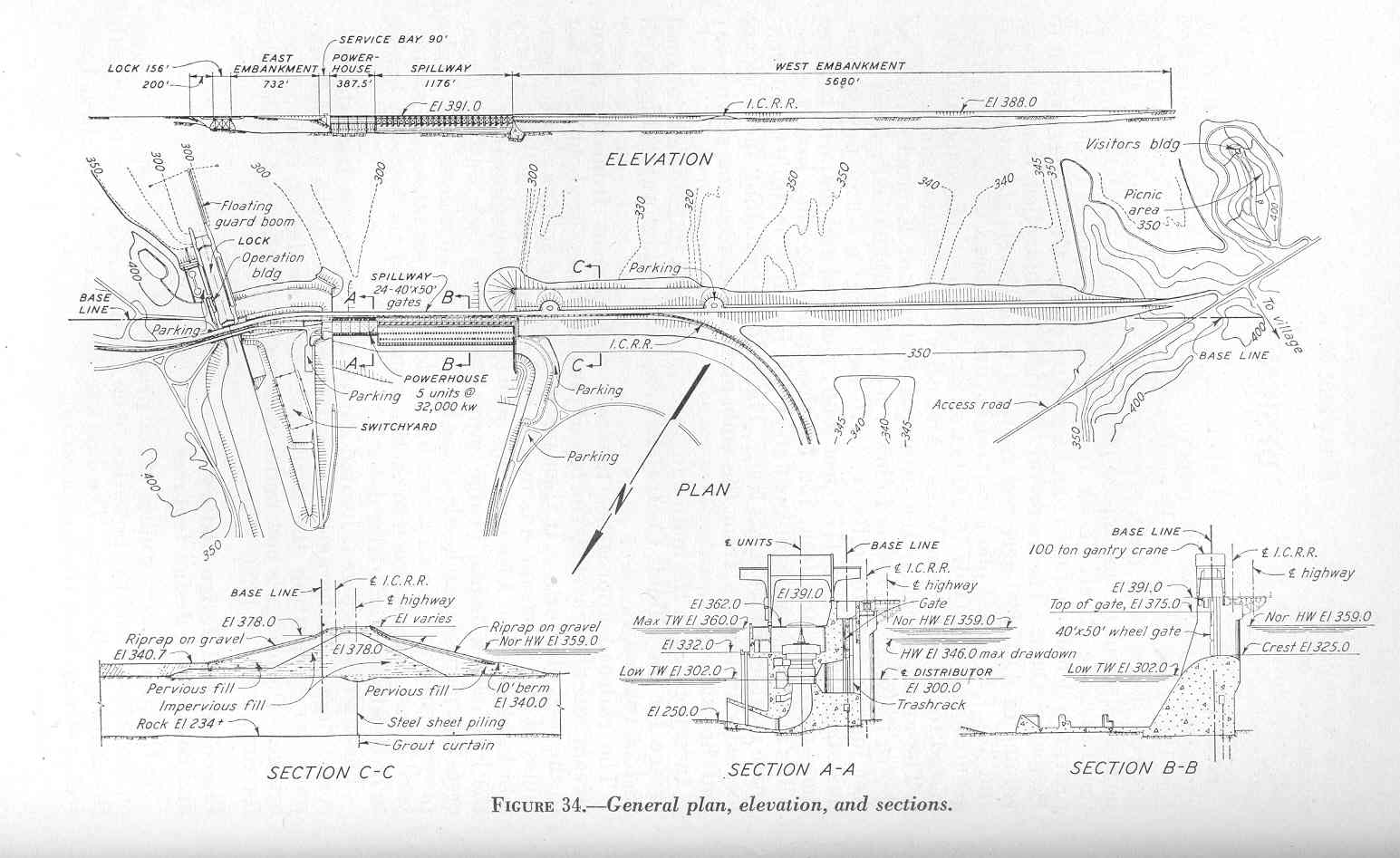
The original design plan for Kentucky Dam, circa 1938

Throughout the 19th century, Congress passed a series of initiatives to improve navigation on the Tennessee River between the river's mouth and Florence, Alabama. By the 1890s, a 5-foot (1.5 m) continuous channel had been secured, but was still deemed insufficient for major river traffic. The U.S. Army Corps of Engineers conducted an extensive survey of the lower river in the early 1900s, and recommended constructing a dam at Aurora Landing (roughly 20 miles (32 km) above the present site), but the project was never funded. In the 1930s, the Tennessee Valley Authority sought to create a continuous minimum 9-foot (2.7 m) channel along the entirety of the river from Paducah to Knoxville. The Authority also sought to help control flooding on the lower Mississippi River, especially in the aftermath of the destructive Ohio River flood of 1937. Research had shown that 4% of the water in the lower Mississippi originates in the Tennessee River watershed. TVA surveyed the lower part of the river and considered the Aurora Landing site, but eventually settled on the present site at river mile 22.4. The Kentucky Dam project was authorized by Congress on May 23, 1938, and construction began July 1, 1938.

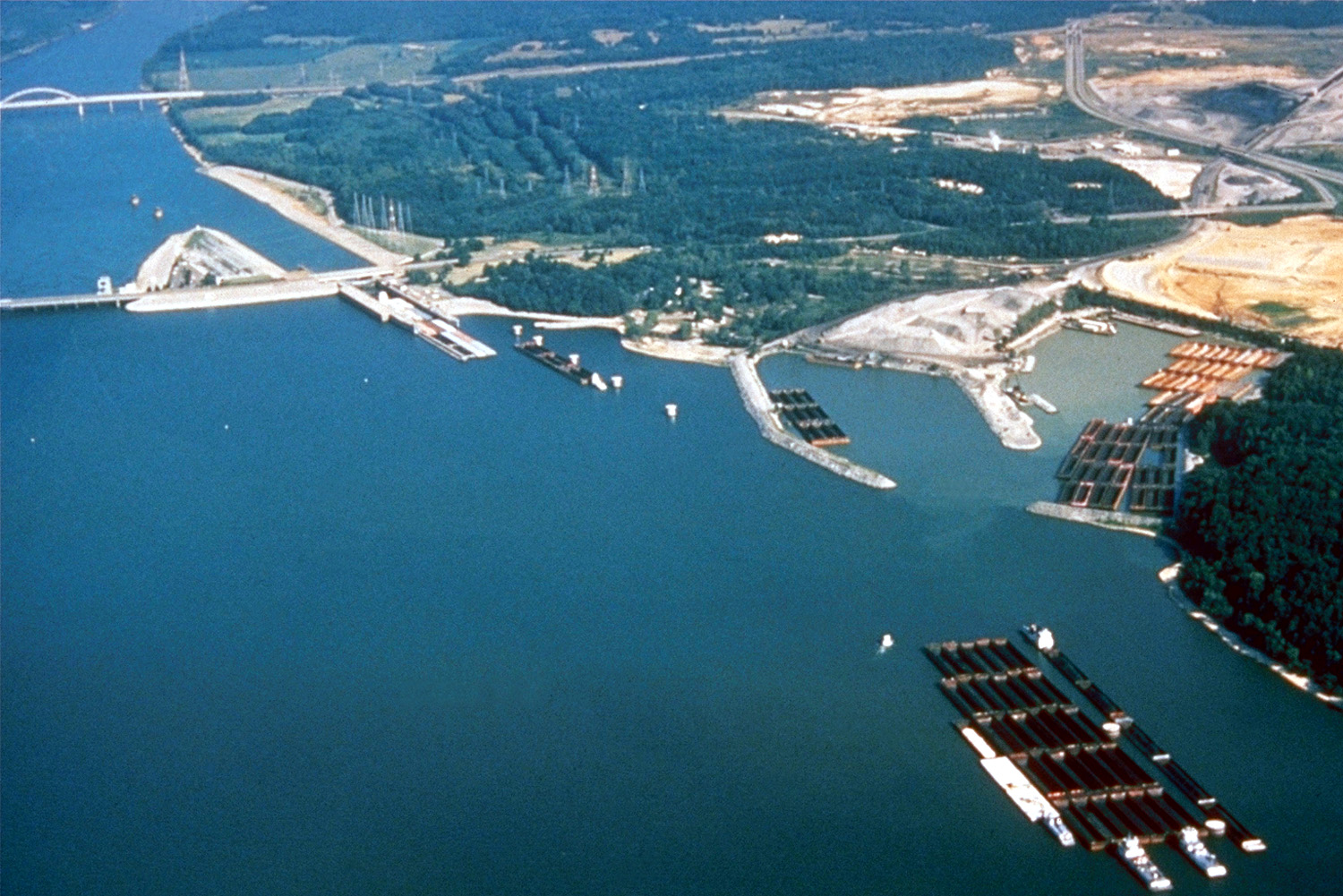
Aerial view of Kentucky Dam's lock

The construction of Kentucky Dam and its reservoir required the purchase 320,244 acres (129,598 ha) of land, 48,496 acres (19,626 ha) of which had to be cleared. 2,609 families, 3,390 graves, and 365 miles (587 km) of roads had to be relocated. 65 new bridges were built, 7 were rebuilt, and 3 were razed. The Illinois Central Railroad— which crossed a bridge just downstream from the dam— was rerouted to cross the top of the dam. The communities of Johnsonville and Springville in Tennessee, and Birmingham in Kentucky were completely inundated by the project. A protective dike was constructed at Big Sandy, Tennessee to protect the town from reservoir backwaters.

Kentucky Dam was completed and its gates closed on August 30, 1944, and its first generator went online September 14, 1944. The project cost nearly $118 million, making it the most expensive TVA dam project. Kentucky Dam's navigation lock was the first lock designed by TVA— the Corps of Engineers had designed the locks for previous TVA dam projects. The Corps of Engineers is designing the new lock, which was scheduled for completion in 2008.

Since Kentucky Dam is located in the New Madrid Seismic Zone — which produced earthquakes of estimated magnitude 7.0 to 7.9 in 1811 — it is one of the few TVA dams built to withstand major earthquake shocks. Emergency preparedness officials in Marshall County and McCracken County, Kentucky (downstream from the dam) and a TVA spokesman discussed concerns of the public about the dam in 2005 in a local newspaper, The Paducah Sun. The dam was regarded as well maintained. Experts suggested that any dam failure would probably occur in the earthen levees at the end of the concrete portion of the dam, and the subsequent release would start small and enlarge as water poured through it. It is not expected that a 50-foot (15 m) wall of water would suddenly go down the river. Instead, the water level would rise slowly over at least six hours before flooding the Calvert City chemical plants. The floodwater should reach only the base of the Paducah floodwall.

The dam also carried a railroad line and two lanes of US 62/641 at its crest. However, due to the planned lock expansion, two new crossings were built just downstream of the dam—a two-lane road bridge and a separate rail bridge. The new bridges were opened in late 2009. The road atop the dam is still in use for local traffic accessing the dam's powerhouse and visitor center, but is no longer a complete crossing, as the bridges that crossed the locks are now closed.

== See also ==
- Dams and reservoirs of the Tennessee River
- List of crossings of the Tennessee River
