= Lake Barkley =

Reservoir on the Cumberland River in Kentucky and Tennessee, United States

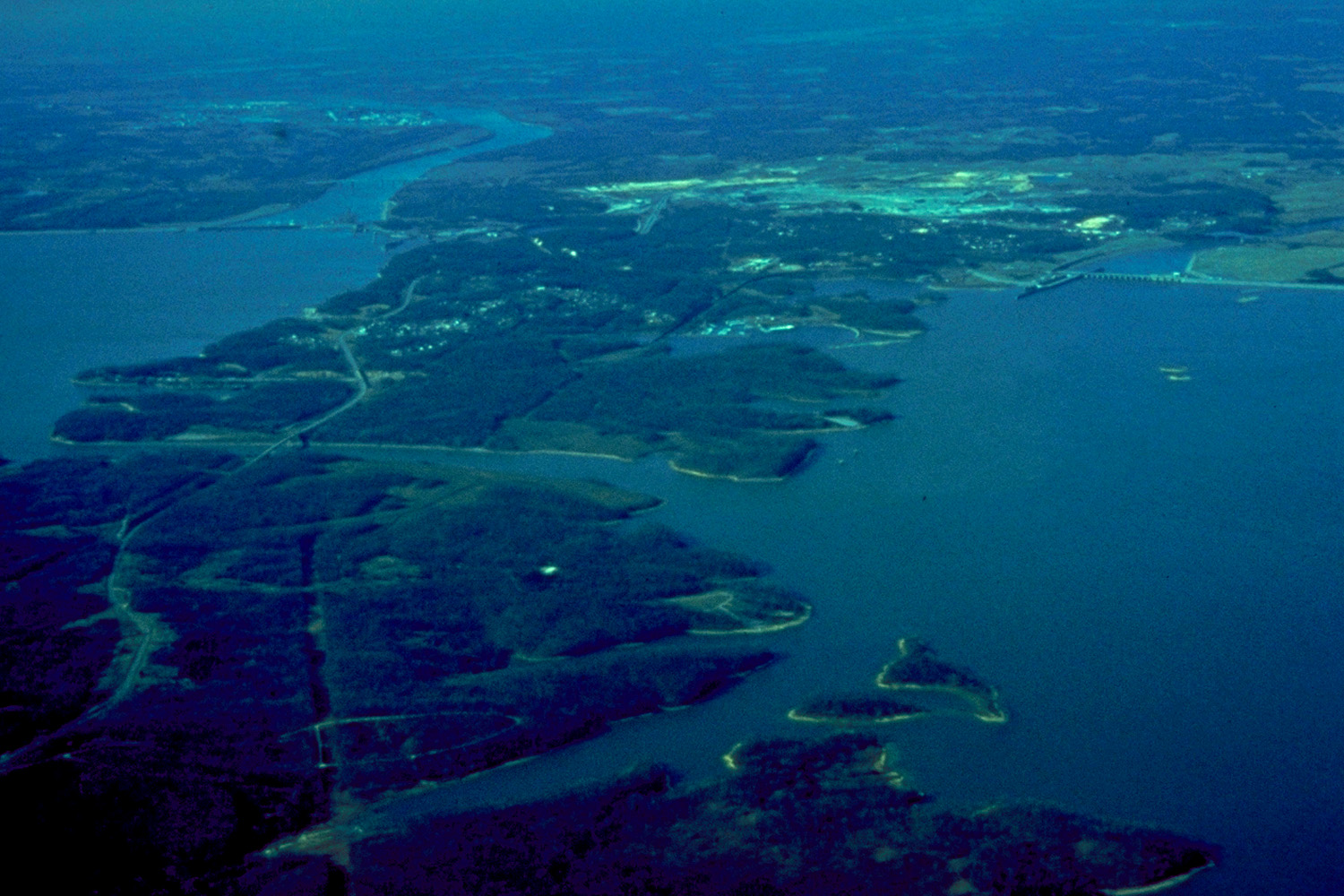
- Aerial view of Kentucky Lake and Lake Barkley. Lake Barkley is on the right. The canal connecting Lake Barkley to Kentucky Lake is visible at left-center.

- Location within Kentucky Location within the United States
- Location: Livingston County, Lyon County and Trigg County in Kentucky; Stewart County and Houston County in Tennessee
- Coordinates: 37°01′15″N 88°13′22″W
- Basin countries: United States
- Max. length: 216 km (134 mi)
- Surface area: 234 km^{2} (90 sq mi)
- Water volume: Maximum: 2,082,000 acre⋅ft (2.568 km^{3})
- Surface elevation: 109 m (358 ft)

Lake Barkley, a 58,000-acre (230 km^{2}) reservoir in Livingston County, Lyon County and Trigg County in Kentucky and extending into Stewart County and Houston County in Tennessee, was impounded by the U.S. Army Corps of Engineers in 1966 upon the completion of Barkley Dam. Both the lake and the dam are named for Vice President Alben Barkley, a Kentucky native.

The dam impounds the Cumberland River near Grand Rivers, Kentucky, approximately 38 miles (61 km) upstream from where the Cumberland empties into the Ohio River. One mile (1.6 km) above the dam is a canal connecting Lake Barkley with Kentucky Lake, forming one of the greatest freshwater recreational complexes in the country. The lakes run parallel courses for more than 50 miles (80 km), with the Land Between the Lakes National Recreation Area located between them.

Lake Barkley is 134 miles (216 km) long with a shoreline measuring 1,004 miles (1,616 km). The lake's level is maintained at different levels throughout the year for flood control purposes. Summer pool, 359 ft (109 m) above sea level, is normally reached by May 1. The water level begins dropping gradually on July 1, and winter pool (354 ft; 108 m) is reached by December 1. The spring rise starts April 1. The lake's water surface area varies accordingly from 57,920 acres (234.4 km^{2}) at summer pool to 45,210 acres (183.0 km^{2}) at winter pool.

== History ==
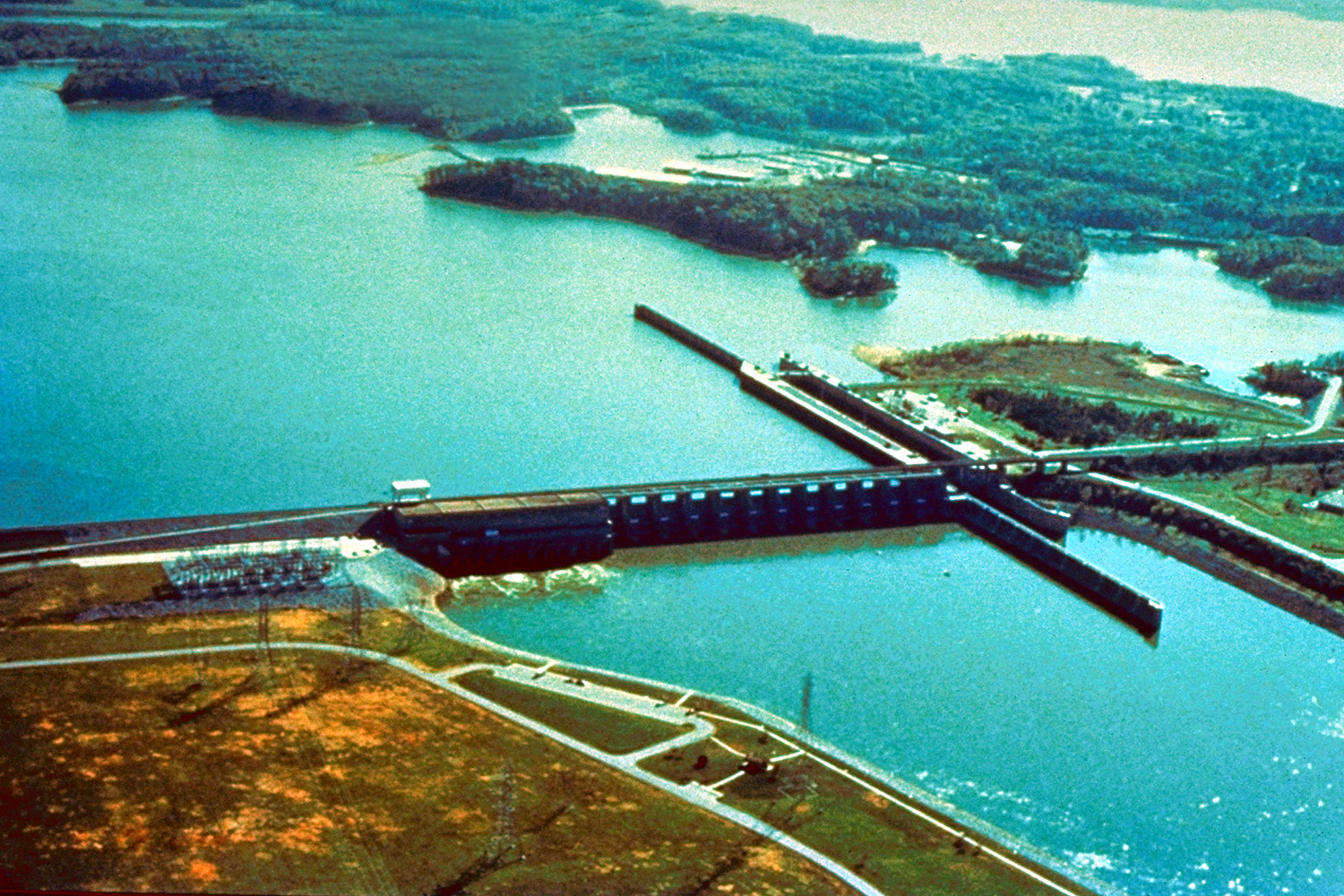
Lake Barkley Lock and Dam, impounding Lake Barkley

As with the formation of Kentucky Lake, communities were flooded in the 1960s to build Lake Barkley. Locals often refer to "Old Eddyville" for Eddyville and "Old Kuttawa" for Kuttawa. The "Old" areas were the portions of the cities that were left above the water after the areas were flooded; these old areas are now lakefront. The present-day cities were created on nearby sites after the lake was impounded. Old foundations and streets, previously flooded, are still visible during winter pool. Highways were even relocated, including US 68 and US 62, along with state routes and smaller streets. The Illinois Central Railroad was also relocated; the former alignment can still be seen under water from low flying planes above.

The area was significantly damaged by a violent EF4 tornado on December 10, 2021. The State Park lodges were opened to house area residents whose homes were destroyed.

== Recreation ==
Lake Barkley State Resort Park is located on the eastern shore of the lake.

The largest yellow bass ever taken in Kentucky (1 lb., 1 oz.) was caught in the waters of Lake Barkley.

In 2019 officials started to aggressively deal with the invasion of Asian carp into Lake Barkley and Kentucky Lake. The state is using electo-shock fishing and sonic devices and hope to remove 5 million pounds of the species a year

== See also ==
- Lake Barkley State Resort Park
- Land Between The Lakes National Recreation Area
