= Jesse C. Gilbert =

American politician

Member of the Kentucky Senate from the 2nd district
- In office August 7, 1871 – August 2, 1875
- Preceded by: Oscar Turner
- Succeeded by: S. H. Jenkins

Member of the Kentucky House of Representatives from Marshall County
- In office August 5, 1861 – December 21, 1861
- Preceded by: Thomas L. Goheen (Note: As the representative from Livingston and Marshall Counties.)
- Succeeded by: Willie Waller

Personal details
- Party: Democratic

Jesse Carter Gilbert (1831, Benton, Kentucky - 24 September 1894, Longview, Texas) was an attorney and politician. He served in the Kentucky House of Representatives from August 1861 until his expulsion on December 21. He was elected state senator from the second district in 1871 and served until 1875. Afterward he was an attorney, practicing in Paducah, Kentucky for the balance of his life. The town of Gilbertsville, Kentucky was named for him in 1874.
