= Kentucky Dam Village State Resort Park =

State park in Kentucky, United States

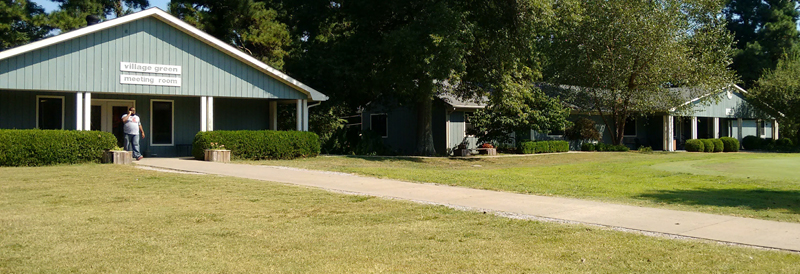
- The Village Green at Kentucky Dam Village

- Location within Kentucky Location within the United States
- Type: Kentucky state park
- Location: Marshall County, Kentucky, United States
- Coordinates: 37°00′23″N 88°17′41″W
- Area: 1,352 acres (547 ha)
- Established: 1949
- Administrator: Kentucky Department of Parks
- Website: Official website

Kentucky Dam Village State Resort Park is a public recreation area located on the northern shore of Kentucky Lake in Marshall County, Kentucky, United States. The state park features a convention center, 18-hole golf course, and lighted runway for light aircraft.
