= Kentucky Lake =

Reservoir on the Tennessee River in Kentucky and Tennessee, United States

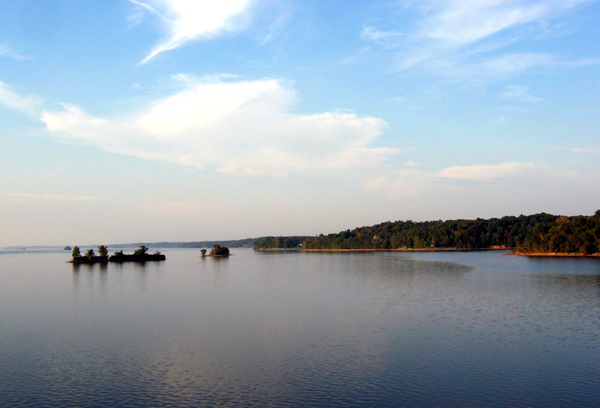

- Location within Kentucky Location within Tennessee Location within the United States
- Location: Kentucky / Tennessee
- Coordinates: 37°00′47″N 88°16′12″W
- Type: Reservoir
- Basin countries: United States
- Surface area: 160,309 acres (649 km^{2})
- Max. depth: 75 ft (23 m)
- Water volume: Maximum: 4,008,000 acre⋅ft (4.944 km^{3})
- Surface elevation: 354 ft (108 m)

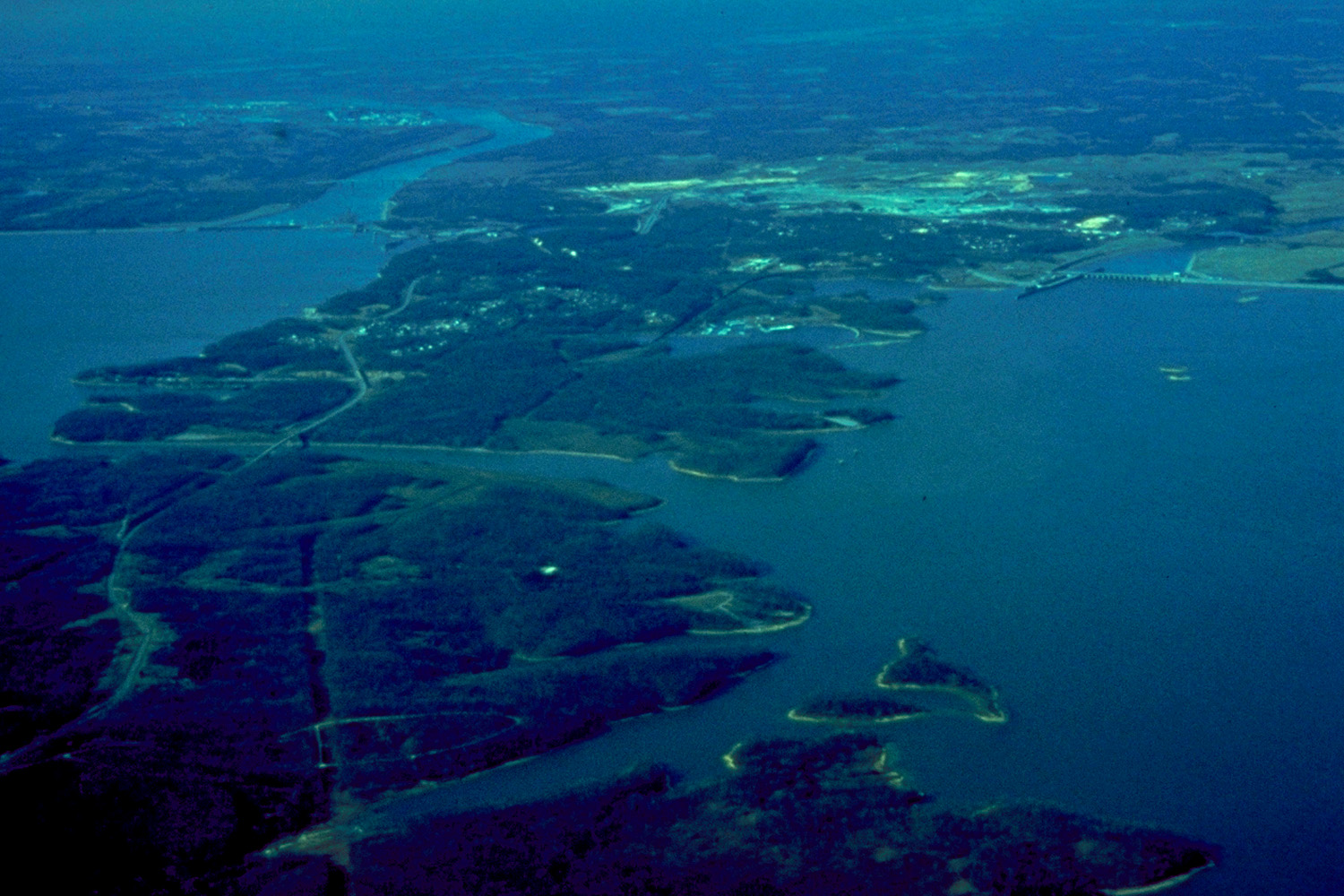
Aerial view of Kentucky Lake and Lake Barkley. Kentucky Lake is on the left. The canal connecting Lake Barkley to Kentucky Lake is visible at left-center.

Kentucky Lake is a major navigable reservoir along the Tennessee River in Kentucky and Tennessee. It was created in 1944 by the Tennessee Valley Authority's impounding of the Tennessee River via Kentucky Dam for flood control and hydroelectric power. The 160,309-acre (649 km^{2}) lake is the largest artificial lake by surface area in the United States east of the Mississippi River, with 2,064 miles (3,322 km) of shoreline. Kentucky Lake has a flood storage capacity of 4,008,000 acre⋅ft (4.944 km^{3}), more than 2.5 times the next largest lake in the TVA system.

Kentucky Lake provides a source for hydro-electric power and is a recreational destination. Along with Lake Barkley, it is one of the lakes alluded to by the name of Land Between the Lakes National Recreation Area.

== Recreation ==
The lake is a desirable fishing area. Professional fishing tournaments are held on Kentucky Lake, including tournaments hosted by Major League Fishing and American Bass Anglers. Records for the largest of three species of fish ever taken in Kentucky have been set at this lake: white bass (5 lb [2.3 kg]), Buffalo carp (55 lb [25 kg]), and yellow perch (1 lb 4 oz [0.57 kg]). It is also the major attraction for two Kentucky state parks: Kentucky Dam Village State Resort Park to the north and Kenlake State Resort Park to the west.

== Invasive species ==
Asian carp are a type of invasive species that have started to accumulate in the waterways throughout Kentucky. They pose a major threat to the environmental stability of the lake because of their competition with native fish species. Bigheaded carp were first reported in Lake Barkley and Kentucky Lake in 2002. Their numbers have since increased greatly; they now can be found throughout both lakes and are exhibiting extremely fast growth. Some restaurants in Kentucky and across the country have added carp to their menus, noting its clean taste, white meat, low mercury content, and affordable cost.

== See also ==
- List of lakes of Kentucky
- Lake, Kentucky, an unincorporated community
- List of dams and reservoirs of the Tennessee River
- Land Between the Lakes National Recreation Area
- Kenlake State Resort Park
- Kentucky Dam Village State Resort Park
- Eggner's Ferry Bridge
- Salt Lick Reservation controversy
