= Kentucky Route 1501 =

Highway in Kentucky, United States

Kentucky Route 1501
- Hands Pike
- KY 1501 highlighted in red

Route information
- Maintained by KYTC
- Length: 2.245 mi (3.613 km)
- Existed: c. 1983–present

Major junctions
- West end: KY 17 in Covington
- KY 3035 in Covington
- East end: KY 16 in Covington

Location
- Country: United States
- State: Kentucky
- Counties: Kenton

Highway system
- Kentucky State Highway System; Interstate; US; State; Parkways
← KY 1500	→ KY 1501

Kentucky Route 1501 (KY 1501) is a 2.496-mile-long (4.017 km) state secondary highway in central Kenton County. Known as Hands Pike, the highway extends from KY 17 east to KY 16 within Covington. KY 1501 was established by 1983 and was redirected at its western end in 2023.

== Route description ==
KY 1501 begins at an intersection with KY 17 (Madison Pike) next to Banklick Creek at the city limit in the far southwestern part of the city of Covington. At the hill's base, it meets a small fragment of KY 3035 (Madison Pike) that sits between KY 1501 and KY 3716. KY 1501 formally intersected with KY 3716 at Wayman Branch before meeting a three-way intersection with KY 17, but was rerouted in 2023 to meet KY 17 at the north end of KY 3035 proper. The highway begins at a steep hill, cut to bypass the old two-lane Hands Pike before rejoining with it at the top of the slope. Continuing southeast, the highway winds past several suburban homes, subdivisions, and a private school as it moves toward its terminus at KY 16 (Taylor Mill Road) at a southeastern city limit of Covington. The Kentucky Transportation Cabinet includes the entire length of KY 1501 in the state secondary highway system.

== History ==
The Kentucky Transportation Cabinet had established KY 1501 on Hands Pike by 1983, when the agency reclassified the highway from a rural secondary highway to a state secondary highway through a September 27, 1983, official order. The state adjusted the eastern and western ends of KY 1501 in conjunction with realignments of KY 17 and KY 16 that the state completed in 2002 when KY 17 was adjusted to 4 lane divided highway and in 2013 when KY 16 was also converted to 4 lanes with a center lane, respectively. The Kentucky Transportation Cabinet began construction of a new alignment of KY 1501 from KY 17's intersection with KY 3035 south of KY 1501's current terminus to south of KY 3716 in 2021. The project will eliminate several sharp curves and a 13% grade south of KY 3716. After the state completes the project, KY 3716 will be extended west to KY 17 along the current stretch of KY 1501. The agency expects to complete the relocation of KY 1501 by July 2023.

== Updates ==
The New road is now open and 100% complete and has been for some time now, the old section of the road was renamed to KY 3716 (Wayman Branch Road) but the sign still says Hands Pike Rd.

== Major intersections ==
The entire route is in Covington, Kenton County.

mi	km	Destinations	Notes
0.000	0.000	KY 17 (Madison Pike) – Independence, Fort Wright	Western terminus of KY 1501
0.062	0.100	KY 3035 south (Madison Pike)	
2.245	3.613	KY 16 (Taylor Mill Road) – Taylor Mill, Walton	Eastern terminus of KY 1501
1.000 mi = 1.609 km; 1.000 km = 0.621 mi
