= Kentucky Route 3716 =

Highway in Kentucky, United States

Kentucky Route 3716
- KY 3716 highlighted in red

Route information
- Maintained by KYTC
- Length: 4.620 mi (7.435 km)
- Existed: 2015–present

Major junctions
- South end: KY 17 in Covington
- North end: KY 16 in Taylor Mill

Location
- Country: United States
- State: Kentucky
- Counties: Kenton

Highway system
- Kentucky State Highway System; Interstate; US; State; Parkways
← KY 3680	→ KY 3886

Kentucky Route 3716 (KY 3716) is a 4.277-mile-long (6.883 km) state secondary highway in central Kenton County. The highway extends from KY 1501 in Covington north to KY 16 in Taylor Mill. KY 3716 was established in 2015, extended west in 2018, and was extended again in December 2022 after the reroute of KY 1501.

== Route description ==
KY 3716 begins at an intersection with KY 17 in the far southern part of the city of Covington. The highway heads east along two-lane Wayman Branch Road, which parallels the eponymous creek to the boundary between Covington and the city of Taylor Mill. KY 3716 continues to the route's four-legged intersection with KY 16. KY 16 heads south on Taylor Mill Road and north on Pride Parkway; KY 3716 continues east on Taylor Mill Road. The highway follows a crescent-shaped path through Taylor Mill to its northern terminus at KY 16 at the northern end of Pride Parkway and the southern end of another KY 16 segment of Taylor Mill Road just south of KY 16's partial cloverleaf interchange with Interstate 275. The Kentucky Transportation Cabinet includes the entire length of KY 3716 in the state secondary highway system.

== History ==
After construction finished on KY 16's bypass of Taylor Mill, Pride Parkway, the Kentucky Transportation Cabinet accepted the new road as part of KY 16 and established KY 3716 along the bypassed part of KY 16 through a September 1, 2015, official order. The agency brought Wayman Branch Road into the state primary road system as an extension of KY 3716 through a September 20, 2018, official order. KY 3716 is expected to be extended west from the highway's terminus at KY 1501 along the latter highway to KY 17 (Madison Pike) after KY 1501 is realigned to a new intersection with KY 17. The KY 1501 realignment and a drainage and resurfacing project on the Wayman Branch Road portion of KY 3716 are expected to be completed by July 2023.

== Major intersections ==
The entire route is in Kenton County.

Location	mi	km	Destinations	Notes
Covington	0.000	0.000	KY 17 (Madison Pike)	Southern terminus of KY 3716
Covington	0.173	0.278	KY 3035 (Old Madison Pike)	
Taylor Mill	1.771	2.850	KY 16 (Pride Parkway/Taylor Mill Road) – Walton	
Taylor Mill	4.620	7.435	KY 16 (Pride Parkway/Taylor Mill Road) to I-275 – Covington	Northern terminus of KY 3716
1.000 mi = 1.609 km; 1.000 km = 0.621 mi
