= Kentucky Route 3035 =

State highway in Kentucky, United States

Kentucky Route 3035
- Madison Pike
- KY 3035 highlighted in red

Route information
- Maintained by KYTC
- Length: 2.744 mi (4.416 km)
- Existed: 2002–present

Major junctions
- South end: KY 17 Bus. in Independence
- KY 17 in Covington
- North end: KY 3716 in Covington

Location
- Country: United States
- State: Kentucky
- Counties: Kenton

Highway system
- Kentucky State Highway System; Interstate; US; State; Parkways
| ← KY 3034 | → KY 3036 |

Kentucky Route 3035 (KY 3035) is a 2.744-mile-long (4.416 km) state highway in the U.S. state of Kentucky. Known as Madison Pike, the highway extends from KY 17 Bus. in Independence north to KY 3716 in Covington in central Kenton County. KY 3035 was assigned in 2002 to a bypassed section of KY 17.

== Route description ==
KY 3035 begins at an intersection with KY 17 Bus. within the city of Independence. KY 17 Bus. heads south along Madison Pike and northeast along Pelly Road. KY 3035 follows two-lane Madison Pike north past a pair of elementary schools. The highway runs atop the city limits of Independence north before leaving the city at Fowler Creek just south of the route's intersection with KY 1486 (Fowler Creek Road) and KY 1829 (Richardson Road), which head east and west, respectively, from the intersection. KY 3035 follows a city limit of Covington northeast along Banklick Creek to an intersection with KY 17 (Madison Pike) and KY 1501 (Hands Pike). The highway briefly runs concurrently with KY 1501 before KY 3035 curves north and follows the creek on the east side of KY 17. KY 3035 crosses Wayman Branch and, at an intersection with an unnumbered Madison Pike, turns northeast fully into the city of Covington to its northern terminus at KY 3716 (Wayman Branch Road).

The Kentucky Transportation Cabinet classifies KY 3035 between KY 17 Bus. and KY 1501 as a state secondary highway and the portion from KY 1501 to KY 3716 as a supplemental road.

== History ==
The Kentucky Transportation Cabinet assigned KY 3035 to a bypassed portion of KY 17 through a July 12, 2002, official order. KY 3035 was originally classified as a supplemental road for its whole length; on October 19, 2004, the agency decreed an upgrade to part of the route's classification to state secondary. The southern terminus of the highway was at KY 17 in Independence until the KY 17 bypass of Independence opened; the state redesignated the road at the southern terminus of KY 3035 as KY 17 Bus. through a May 12, 2009, official order. The transportation cabinet transferred the now-unnumbered piece of Madison Pike near KY 3035's northern terminus to county maintenance on May 5, 2011.

== Major intersections ==
The entire route is in Kenton County.

| Location | mi | km | Destinations | Notes |
|---|---|---|---|---|
| Independence | 0.000 | 0.000 | KY 17 Bus. (Madison Pike) | Southern terminus of KY 3035 |
| Covington | 1.745 | 2.808 | KY 1486 east (Fowler Creek Road) / KY 1829 west (Richardson Road) | |
| Covington | 2.335 | 3.758 | KY 17 (Madison Pike) – Independence, Covington | Western terminus of KY 1501; south end of concurrency with KY 1501 |
| Covington | 2.397 | 3.858 | KY 1501 east (Hands Pike) | North end of concurrency with KY 1501 |
| Covington | 2.744 | 4.416 | KY 3716 (Wayman Branch Road) – Taylor Mill | Northern terminus of KY 3035 |
1.000 mi = 1.609 km; 1.000 km = 0.621 mi
