= Kentucky Route 177 =

State highway in Kentucky, United States

Kentucky Route 177
- KY 177 highlighted in black

Route information
- Maintained by KYTC
- Length: 29.957 mi (48.211 km)

Major junctions
- South end: KY 159, near Butler
- US 27, near Butler; KY 14, near Morning View
- North end: KY 16 in Latonia

Location
- Country: United States
- State: Kentucky
- Counties: Kenton, Pendleton

Highway system
- Kentucky State Highway System; Interstate; US; State; Parkways
| ← KY 176 | → KY 178 |

Kentucky Route 177 (KY 177) is a 29.957-mile (48.211 km) state highway that exists in Kenton and Pendleton counties in the northern part of the U.S. state of Kentucky.

== Route description ==
KY 177 begins at an intersection with KY 159 east of Butler in rural Pendleton County. From there, it winds west and somewhat north, intersecting with U.S. Route 27 (US 27) just north of the Licking River near Morning View. It continues west for a short distance before turning southeast to cross the Licking River at Butler. In town, it turns southeast following Mill Street. It follows Lick Creek south before turning back west and northwest at an intersection with KY 3185. It continues northwest through rural parts of Kenton County intersecting with KY 467 near DeMossville. After another couple of miles, it finally turns more northernly, following the Licking River and intersecting with KY 14 at Morning View, KY 2042 near Kenton. Continuing its path north, it intersects KY 536 coming from the west at Visalia and both roads travel concurrent for a short distance before KY 536 departs to the east. KY 177 continues north through parts of Decoursey, Ryland Heights, and Taylor Mill, before ending at an intersection with KY 16 a short distance south of that highway's intersection with KY 17.Between the Town of Butler and State Highway 3185 South of Butler the road is closed to vehicles over 9 feet 9 inches due to a narrow and low bridge.

== Major intersections ==
| County | Location | mi | km | Destinations | Notes |
|---|---|---|---|---|---|
| Pendleton | Butler | 0.000 | 0.000 | KY 159 | Southern terminus |
| Pendleton | Butler | 2.342 | 3.769 | KY 609 south | Northern terminus of KY 609 |
| Pendleton | Butler | 4.012 | 6.457 | US 27 | |
| Pendleton | DeMossville | 9.154 | 14.732 | KY 467 south (DeMossville Road) | Northern terminus of KY 467 |
| Kenton | Morning View | 12.443 | 20.025 | KY 14 west (Rich Road) | Eastern terminus of KY 14 |
| Kenton | Kenton | 15.433 | 24.837 | KY 2042 west (Kenton Station Road) | Eastern terminus of KY 2042 |
| Kenton | Visalia | 18.771 | 30.209 | KY 536 west (Visalia Road) | South end of KY 536 overlap |
| Kenton | Visalia | 19.181 | 30.869 | KY 536 east (Creektrace Road) | North end of KY 536 overlap |
| Kenton | Ryland Heights | 21.420 | 34.472 | KY 2044 south (Pruett Road) | Northern terminus of KY 2044 |
| Kenton | Ryland Heights | 24.710 | 39.767 | KY 2047 south (Marshall Road) | Northern terminus of KY 2047 |
| Kenton | Taylor Mill | 27.247 | 43.850 | KY 1930 east (Locust Pike) | Western terminus of KY 1930 |
| Kenton | Latonia | 29.957 | 48.211 | KY 16 (Wilson Avenue/Decoursey Avenue) | Northern terminus |
1.000 mi = 1.609 km; 1.000 km = 0.621 mi: Concurrency terminus
