= Kenton, Kentucky =

Unincorporated community in Kentucky, United States

- Unincorporated community
- Location within Kentucky Location within the United States
- Coordinates: 38°52′06″N 84°27′22″W
- Country: United States
- State: Kentucky
- County: Kenton
- Elevation: 528 ft (161 m)
- Time zone: UTC-5 (Eastern (EST))
  - Summer (DST): UTC-4 (EDT)
- ZIP code: 41053
- Area code: 859
- GNIS feature ID: 495659

Kenton is an unincorporated community in Kenton County, Kentucky, United States. The community is located along Kentucky Route 177 and the Licking River 7 miles (11 km) southeast of Independence. Kenton has a post office with ZIP code 41053, which opened on February 23, 1858.
