= Kentucky Route 17 =

Highway in Kentucky

Kentucky Route 17
- KY 17; mainline in red, business route in blue

Route information
- Maintained by KYTC
- Length: 34.660 mi (55.780 km)

Major junctions
- South end: US 27 near Falmouth
- KY 491 in DeMossville; KY 14 in Walton; KY 16 in Independence; KY 536 in Independence; I-275 in Covington; KY 371 in Covington; KY 16 in Covington; KY 8 in Covington
- North end: Theodore M. Berry Way in Cincinnati, OH

Location
- Country: United States
- State: Kentucky
- Counties: Pendleton, Kenton

Highway system
- Kentucky State Highway System; Interstate; US; State; Parkways
← KY 16	→ KY 18

Kentucky Route 17 (KY 17) is a 34.660-mile-long (55.780 km) state highway in the U.S. state of Kentucky. It connects U.S. Route 27 in rural Pendleton County to the Ohio state line in Covington.

== Route description ==
KY 17 begins at an intersection with U.S. Route 27 (US 27) in unincorporated Pendleton County, approximately 4 miles (6.4 km) north of Falmouth. The road heads north with a slight bend to the west. The road takes a sharp turn west with an intersection with KY 467 in DeMossville. The road then heads in a western/northwestern direction, up to Walton, where it meets KY 14. Having picked up the name Madison Pike at the Kenton County line several miles south of KY 14, it heads north toward Independence. Approcaching Independence, the road intersects KY 16, where that highway undergoes a name change: it is known as Walton–Nicholson Road to the west of KY 17, and Taylor Mill Road to the east of KY 17. KY 17 was rerouted to the south of downtown Independence. The old section of KY 17 continues through the heart of Independence, containing landmarks such as Simon Kenton High School and the Kenton County Courthouse where it is now called KY 17 Business. Just north of downtown Independence, KY 17 transitions from a two-lane road to a four-lane divided highway. The name "Madison Pike" stays with the older road that KY 17 was formerly routed along until 2002, and the split occurs at the corner where Summit View Elementary and Middle Schools are located. KY 17 picks up the name "Madison Pike" again when the old road meets up with the current route a little over 2 miles (3.2 km) north. KY 17 passes a park named "Pioneer Park" as it continues north, to its intersection with Interstate 275 (I-275). The road then continues north into Covington. Less than 1 mile (1.6 km) north of its intersection with KY 16, Holmes High School is located on the east side of KY 17. The road then continues north to the Ohio River, where it crosses the river along the John A. Roebling Suspension Bridge. Now in Cincinnati, Ohio, the route terminates near US 52.

== Major intersections ==
County	Location	mi	km	Destinations	Notes
Pendleton		0.000	0.000	US 27 – Newport, Falmouth	Southern terminus
Pendleton		0.765	1.231	KY 1853 west (Bryan Griffin Road)	Eastern terminus of KY-1853
Pendleton	Greenwood	2.584	4.159	KY 3185 north (Butler-Greenwood Road)	
Pendleton		6.934	11.159	KY 467 south	South end of KY 467 overlap
Pendleton		6.997	11.261	KY 467 north to KY 177	North end of KY 467 overlap
Pendleton		8.741	14.067	KY 491 west	Eastern terminus of KY-491
Kenton	Fiskburg	11.381	18.316	KY 2046 east (Fiskburg Road)	South end of KY 2046 overlap
Kenton	Fiskburg	12.679	20.405	KY 2046 west	North end of KY 2046 overlap
Kenton	Piner	14.313	23.035	KY 14	
Kenton	Atwood	17.413	28.024	KY 3072 east (Hempfling Road)	Western terminus of KY-3072
Kenton		18.327	29.494	KY 2042 east (Moffett Road)	Western terminus of KY-2042
Kenton	Nicholson	19.855	31.954	KY 16	
Kenton	Independence	21.151	34.039	Sydney Drive To KY 17 Bus. north – Simon Kenton High School	Road runs west for approximately 1 block and then turns north, intersectinh KY-536 at the southern end of KY-17 Business
Kenton	Independence	21.340	34.343	KY 536 (Shaw Road / Harris Pike)	Southern terminus of KY-17 Business approximately 650 feet west of this intersection
Kenton	Independence	23.140	37.240	KY 2045 (McCullum Road) – Kenton County Courthouse	
Kenton	Independence	23.833	38.355	KY 17 Bus. south (Pelly Road)	Northern terminus of KY-17 Business
Kenton	Covington	24.895	40.065	KY 1486 Conn. to KY 1486 (Fowler Creek Road)	Connector road to KY-1486
Kenton	Covington	25.835	41.577	KY 3035	
Kenton	Erlanger	26.165	42.108	KY 1501 east (Hands Pike)	
Kenton	Fort Wright	28.09	45.21	Old KY 17 (KY 3148 south)	
Kenton	Fort Wright	28.852	46.433	To I-275 / KY 9 – Newport	Exit 80 from I-275 East and ramp to I-275 East
Kenton	Fort Wright	29.046	46.745	To I-275 west / I-71 / I-75 – Airport	Exit 80 from I-275 West and ramp to I-275 West
Kenton	Fort Wright	29.195	46.985	KY 371 north (Orphanage Road)	Southern terminus of KY-371
Kenton	Fort Wright	29.414	47.337	KY 1072 (Highland Pike)	
Kenton	Fort Wright	29.939	48.182	KY 3187 west (Kyles Lane)	Eastern terminus of KY-3187
Kenton	Fort Wright	30.270	48.715	KY 3070 east (Howard Litzler Drive)	
Kenton	Covington	31.910	51.354	KY 16 south (James Avenue)	No right turn to 26th street from northbound 17
Kenton	Covington	32.488	52.284	KY 17 Truck north (Madison Avenue)	
Kenton	Covington	33.426	53.794	KY 1120 west / KY 17 Truck south (M.L. King Jr. Boulevard) to I-75	one-block overlap with KY 1120 west (southbound only)
Kenton	Covington	33.982	54.689	KY 8 east (East 5th Street)	
Kenton	Covington	34.067	54.826	KY 8 west (East 4th Street) to I-71 / I-75	
Ohio River		34.228– 34.660	55.085– 55.780	John A. Roebling Bridge	
Hamilton	Cincinnati			Theodore M. Berry Way	roundabout
1.000 mi = 1.609 km; 1.000 km = 0.621 mi
