= Kentucky Route 536 =

Highway in Kentucky

Kentucky Route 536
- KY 536 highlighted in red

Route information
- Maintained by KYTC
- Length: 29.406 mi (47.324 km)

Major junctions
- West end: KY 338 near Rabbit Hash
- US 42 / US 127 in Florence; I-71 / I-75 in Florence; US 25 in Florence; KY 17 in Independence; KY 16 in Independence
- East end: US 27 in Alexandria

Location
- Country: United States
- State: Kentucky
- Counties: Boone, Kenton, Campbell

Highway system
- Kentucky State Highway System; Interstate; US; State; Parkways
| ← KY 535 | → KY 537 |

Kentucky Route 536 (KY 536) is a state highway that connects Rabbit Hash to Alexandria via Florence and Independence in Northern Kentucky, United States. The western terminus of the route is at Kentucky Route 338 in Rabbit Hash. The eastern terminus is at U.S. Route 27 in Alexandria.

== Route description ==
KY 536 begins at an intersection with KY 338 (East Bend Road) less than a mile east of the Ohio River in Rabbit Hash. As Rabbit Hash Road, KY 536 winds through rural western Boone County before becoming more residential in nature and becoming Hathaway Road as it approaches southern Florence. Near Union, KY 536 intersects with Old Union Road, the former routing of U.S. Route 42 before US 42 was realigned from the Union city line to just south of Ryle High School. At Old Union Road, KY 536 becomes known as Hathaway Road and continues east. 1/4 mile east of its intersection with US 42, KY 536 intersects the modern routing of US 42, here concurrent with U.S. Route 127, and becomes Mount Zion Road.

In eastern Boone County, KY 536 runs through its most congested area—between I-71/I-75 and US 25, marking the end of its status as a purely residential road. KY 237 forms and heads north as Gunpowder Road just west of this segment. Mt. Zion Road continues east into Kenton County toward Independence, where it meets KY 1303 in the western outskirts. Here, Mt. Zion Road and KY 1303 both end while KY 536 continues east on Bristow Road, occupied by KY 1303 north of this point. The road then continues southeast through rural/suburban Independence into the heart of the city, turning into Banklick Station Road for a short length before becoming Shaw Road ahead of an intersection with KY 17. East of KY 17, KY 536 becomes the Harris Pike and heads southeast.

At White's Tower Elementary School east of Independence, KY 536 intersects KY 16. The two routes overlap for a short distance to the northeast before separating at Visalia Road. KY 536 follows Visalia Road to Visalia, where it becomes concurrent with KY 177 on the west bank of the Licking River for a half-mile. North of Visalia, KY 536 crosses the river and enters Campbell County. The route progresses northeast as Creektrace Road to Alexandria, meeting KY 915 before coming to an end at US 27.

== Major intersections ==
| County | Location | mi | km | Destinations | Notes |
|---|---|---|---|---|---|
| Boone | Rabbit Hash | 0.000 | 0.000 | KY 338 (East Bend Road) | Western terminus |
| Boone | | 4.376 | 7.042 | KY 2852 south (Riddles Run Road) | Northern terminus of KY-2852 |
| Boone | Hueys Corners | 8.625 | 13.881 | KY 1925 south (Big Bone Road) | Northern terminus of KY-1925 |
| Boone | Union | 10.930 | 17.590 | US 42 / US 127 | |
| Boone | Florence | 12.512 | 20.136 | KY 237 north (Gunpowder Road) | Southern terminus of KY-237 |
| Boone | Florence | 13.313 | 21.425 | I-71 / I-75 north | Exit 178 off of I-71/I-75 north. Ramps to I-71/I-75 north. |
| Boone | Florence | 13.490 | 21.710 | I-71 / I-75 south | Exit 178 off of I-71/I-75 south. Ramps to I-71/I-75 south. |
| Boone | Florence | 13.752 | 22.132 | KY 3503 north (Sam Neace Drive) | Southern terminus of KY-3503. Access to Gateway Community and Technical College. |
| Boone | Florence | 14.208 | 22.866 | US 25 (Dixie Highway) | |
| Kenton | Independence | 15.841 | 25.494 | KY 1303 north (Bristow Road) | Southern terminus of KY-1303 |
| Kenton | Independence | 16.912 | 27.217 | KY 2043 south (Banklick Road) | Northern terminus of KY-2043 |
| Kenton | Independence | 18.805 | 30.264 | KY 2045 north (Independence Road) | Southern terminus of KY-2045 |
| Kenton | Independence | 19.256 | 30.990 | KY 17 Bus. north | Southern terminus of KY 17 Business |
| Kenton | Independence | 19.382 | 31.192 | KY 17 (Madison Pike) | |
| Kenton | Independence | 20.872 | 33.590 | KY 16 south (Taylor Mill Road) | Southern end of KY-16 overlap |
| Kenton | Independence | 21.100 | 33.957 | KY 16 north (Taylor Mill Road) | Northern end of KY-16 overlap |
| Kenton | Visalia | 25.257 | 40.647 | KY 177 south (Decoursey Pike) | Southern end of KY-177 overlap |
| Kenton | Visalia | 25.736 | 41.418 | KY 177 north (Decoursey Pike) | Northern end of KY-177 overlap |
| Campbell | Alexandria | 26.229 | 42.211 | KY 1936 south (Pond Creek Road) | |
| Campbell | Alexandria | 28.553 | 45.952 | KY 915 (Licking Pike) | |
| Campbell | Alexandria | 29.406 | 47.324 | US 27 (Alexandria Pike) | Eastern terminus |
1.000 mi = 1.609 km; 1.000 km = 0.621 mi: Concurrency terminus
