= Banklick Creek =

River in Kentucky, United States

Coordinates: 39.0328388°N 84.4904974°W

Banklick Creek is a 19.1-mile-long (30.7 km) tributary of the Licking River in northern Kentucky in the United States. By the Licking River and the Ohio River, it is part of the Mississippi River watershed.

Banklick Creek rises in rural areas near the Boone-Kenton County line near the city of Walton then flows northeasterly through Kenton County and empties into the Licking River near Latonia in a highly urbanized area, less than 5 miles (8.0 km) from the Licking's confluence with the Ohio River. Covering more than 58 square miles (150 km^{2}), the topography of the Banklick's watershed ranges from steep to gently sloping. Throughout most of its length, Banklick Creek is shallow and flows over a narrow, gravelly, and sometimes rocky streambed. However, approximately ¾ mi. upstream from its mouth, it becomes wider and 6 to 8 feet (1.8 to 2.4 m) deep.

The upper half of Banklick Creek is home to many species of fish including smallmouth bass, sunfish, suckers, carp, and catfish, as well as crayfish, turtles, snakes, and frogs. The lower half, beyond the inflow of Bullock Pen Creek from Doe Run Lake, the Banklick is seriously impaired and suffers from suburban lawn runoff, siltation due to overdevelopment, and fecal coliforms due to sewer overflows.

Pioneer Park, established by the Kenton County Parks Board in 1976, is situated along the banks of the creek, near the community of Taylor Mill. In the 1970s, the creek, as it bordered the park, was unintentionally contaminated by a local manufacturing concern, with a number of toxic substances that found their way into the streambed. This led to an extensive clean-up effort by both private and public sources, including the United States Environmental Protection Agency. No deaths were linked directly to the 1970s pollution.

Though Banklick Creek is home to numerous species of flora and fauna, it is seldom fished or used for recreation, save at its most western reaches. Banklick Creek was once slightly deeper and more navigable than is the case today, and human village sites which date to the archaic period (some 8000 BC in some cases) are numerous along its length. A log cabin that was built by the region's earliest white settlers still stands near the midpoint of Banklick Creek. The creek is popular with both fossil and artifact seekers, and in 2001 a flint paleo spear point dating to c. 11,000 BC was discovered in a silty gravel outcropping, near Latonia.

== See also ==
- List of rivers of Kentucky
