= Fairview, Kenton County, Kentucky =

- City
- Location in Kenton County, Kentucky

- Location in Kentucky and United States Fairview (the United States)
- Coordinates: 38°59′51″N 84°29′08″W
- Country: United States
- State: Kentucky
- County: Kenton

Government
  - Mayor: Harry Sprott

Area
  - Total: 0.73 sq mi (1.90 km^{2})
  - Land: 0.73 sq mi (1.88 km^{2})
  - Water: 0.0077 sq mi (0.02 km^{2})
- Elevation: 541 ft (165 m)

Population (2020)
  - Total: 144
  - Density: 197.9/sq mi (76.42/km^{2})
- Time zone: UTC-5 (Eastern (EST))
  - Summer (DST): UTC-4 (EDT)
- ZIP code: 41015
- Area code: 859
- FIPS code: 21-26236
- GNIS feature ID: 2403593
- Website: fairview.ky.gov

Fairview is a home rule-class city in Kenton County, Kentucky, United States. The city is a suburb of Cincinnati. It was incorporated by the state assembly in 1957 to avoid annexation by Covington. The population was 144 at the 2020 census.

== Geography ==
Fairview is located in eastern Kenton County. It is bordered to the north and west by Taylor Mill, to the east by unincorporated land, to the southeast by Ryland Heights, and to the southwest by Covington. The city lies in the valley of DeCoursey Creek, a north-flowing tributary of the Licking River, which in turn flows north to the Ohio River.

Kentucky Route 177 runs through Fairview, leading north 6 miles (10 km) to the center of Covington and south 3.5 miles (5.6 km) to Ryland Heights.

According to the United States Census Bureau, the city of Fairview has a total area of 0.73 square miles (1.9 km^{2}), of which 0.01 square miles (0.02 km^{2}), or 0.89%, are water.

== Demographics ==
Historical population
Census	Pop.	Note	%±
1960	368		—
1970	235		−36.1%
1980	198		−15.7%
1990	119		−39.9%
2000	156		31.1%
2010	143		−8.3%
2020	144		0.7%
U.S. Decennial Census

As of the census of 2000, there were 156 people, 60 households, and 48 families residing in the city. The population density was 212.3 inhabitants per square mile (82.0/km^{2}). There were 62 housing units at an average density of 84.4 per square mile (32.6/km^{2}). The racial makeup of the city was 98.08% White, 0.64% Asian, 0.64% from other races, and 0.64% from two or more races. Hispanic or Latino of any race were 1.28% of the population.

There were 60 households, out of which 30.0% had children under the age of 18 living with them, 65.0% were married couples living together, 8.3% had a female householder with no husband present, and 20.0% were non-families. 15.0% of all households were made up of individuals, and 8.3% had someone living alone who was 65 years of age or older. The average household size was 2.60 and the average family size was 2.92.

In the city, the population was spread out, with 17.9% under the age of 18, 6.4% from 18 to 24, 32.1% from 25 to 44, 26.9% from 45 to 64, and 16.7% who were 65 years of age or older. The median age was 41 years. For every 100 females, there were 108.0 males. For every 100 females age 18 and over, there were 113.3 males.

The median income for a household in the city was $55,417, and the median income for a family was $55,417. Males had a median income of $32,917 versus $32,917 for females. The per capita income for the city was $20,737. None of the population or families were below the poverty line.
