= Kentucky Route 16 =

Highway in Kentucky

Kentucky Route 16

Route information
- Maintained by KYTC
- Length: 36.752 mi (59.147 km)

Major junctions
- South end: US 127 in Glencoe
- KY 14 in Verona; I-75 in Walton; US 25 in Walton; KY 17 in Independence; KY 536 in Independence; I-275 in Taylor Mill
- North end: KY 17 in Covington

Location
- Country: United States
- State: Kentucky
- Counties: Gallatin, Boone, Kenton

Highway system
- Kentucky State Highway System; Interstate; US; State; Parkways
← KY 15	→ KY 17

Kentucky Route 16 (KY 16) is a 36.752-mile (59.147 km) state highway in the U.S. state of Kentucky. It follows a southwest–northeast course, paralleling Interstate 71 from U.S. Highway 127 at Glencoe northeast to Walton and continuing northeast and north into Covington, where it ends at KY 17.

== Major intersections ==
County	Location	mi	km	Destinations	Notes
Gallatin	Glencoe	0.000	0.000	US 127 – Glencoe, Warsaw	
Gallatin	Glencoe	0.609	0.980	KY 455 north (Cemetery Road)	Southern terminus of KY 455
Gallatin	Napoleon	4.449	7.160	KY 3002 west (Tapering Pointe Road)	Eastern terminus of KY 3002
Gallatin		6.142	9.885	KY 562 north	Southern terminus of KY 562
Gallatin		9.960	16.029	KY 2850 north	Southern terminus of KY 2850
Boone	Verona	13.342	21.472	KY 14 west (Verona-Mudlick Road) / KY 491 east (Lebanon-Crittenden Road) to I-71	South end of KY 14 overlap; western terminus of KY 491
Boone	Walton	17.416	28.028	KY 1292 west (Beaver Road) – Big Bone Lick State Park	Eastern terminus of KY 1292
Boone	Walton	17.444– 17.581	28.073– 28.294	I-75 – Cincinnati, Lexington	I-75 exit 171
Boone	Walton	18.190	29.274	US 25 south / KY 14 east (South Main Street) – Crittenden	North end of KY 14 concurrency; south end of US 25 concurrency
Boone	Walton	19.984	32.161	US 25 north (Dixie Highway) – Richwood, Florence	North end of US 25 concurrency
Kenton		21.929	35.291	KY 2043 north (Banklick Road)	South end of KY 2043 overlap
Kenton		22.705	36.540	KY 2043 south (Green Road)	North end of KY 2043 overlap
Kenton	Nicholson	24.525	39.469	KY 17 (Madison Pike) – Independence, Covington	
Kenton	Independence	26.418	42.516	KY 536 west (Harris Pike)	South end of KY 536 overlap
Kenton	Independence	26.646	42.883	KY 536 east (Maverick Road)	North end of KY 536 overlap
Kenton	Independence	26.957	43.383	KY 2044 east (Marshall Road)	Western terminus of KY 2044
Kenton	Independence	27.037	43.512	KY 1486 north (Stephens Road)	Southern terminus of KY 1486
Kenton	Independence	28.303	45.549	KY 2045 west (Cox Road)	Eastern terminus of KY 2045
Kenton	Independence	28.441	45.771	Mills Road	Former KY 2045 east
Kenton	Independence	29.861	48.057	KY 2047 east (Klette Road)	South end of KY 2047 overlap
Kenton	Independence–Covington line	30.177	48.565	KY 2047 west (Senour Road)	North end of KY 2047 overlap
Kenton	Covington	30.373	48.881	KY 1501 west (Hands Pike)	
Kenton	Taylor Mill	31.615	50.879	KY 3716 (Taylor Mill Road/Waymans Branch Road)	Former alignment of KY 16
Kenton	Taylor Mill	33.604	54.080	KY 3716 south (Taylor Mill Road)	Northern terminus of KY 3716; former alignment of KY 16
Kenton	Taylor Mill	33.769– 34.043	54.346– 54.787	I-275 to I-71 / I-75 / I-471 – Airport	I-275 exit 79
Kenton	Covington	35.016	56.353	KY 3070 west (Howard Litzler Drive)	Eastern terminus of KY 3070
Kenton	Covington	35.781	57.584	KY 177 south (Decoursey Avenue)	Northern terminus of KY 177
Kenton	Covington	36.752	59.147	KY 17 (Madison Avenue)	Northern terminus of KY 16
1.000 mi = 1.609 km; 1.000 km = 0.621 mi
