= Kentucky Route 371 =

State highway in Kentucky, United States

Kentucky Route 371
- KY 371 highlighted in red

Route information
- Maintained by KYTC
- Length: 6.947 mi (11.180 km)

Major junctions
- South end: KY 17 in Fort Wright
- US 25 / US 42 / US 127 in Fort Mitchell; I-71 / I-75 on the Fort Mitchell–Crescent Springs line
- North end: KY 8 in Villa Hills

Location
- Country: United States
- State: Kentucky
- Counties: Kenton

Highway system
- Kentucky State Highway System; Interstate; US; State; Parkways
← KY 370	→ KY 372

Kentucky Route 371 (KY 371) is a 6.947-mile-long (11.180 km) state highway in the U.S. state of Kentucky. The highway connects urban areas of Kenton County.

== Route description ==
KY 371 begins at an intersection with KY 17 (Madison Pike) in the central part of Fort Wright, within Kenton County, where the roadway continues as Eaton Drive. This intersection is at KY 17's crossing of Horse Branch and just north-northeast of that highway's interchange with Interstate 275 (I-275). KY 371 travels to the west-northwest and curves to the southwest. Almost immediately, it leaves Fort Wright and enters the southern part of Fort Mitchell. It curves to the northwest and has a brief concurrency with US 25/US 42/US 127 (Dixie Highway). KY 371 splits off at the Fort Mitchell–Lakeside Park city line. It travels along the city line and enters Lakeside Park proper. It passes a U.S. Post Office of Covington. The highway curves to the west-northwest and re-enters Fort Mitchell. It has an interchange with I-71/I-75 on the Fort Mitchell–Crescent Springs city line. It enters Crescent Springs proper, curves to the north-northeast, and travels on a bridge over some railroad tracks of Norfolk Southern Railway and intersects the northern terminus of KY 2373 (Anderson Road). The highway curves to the west-northwest and passes St. Joseph Elementary School. As soon as it enters Villa Hills, it curves to the northwest. It turns left, to the southwest, onto Amsterdam Road. KY 371 curves to the west and passes River Ridge Elementary School. It curves to the northwest and begins paralleling Dry Creek. It curves to the north-northwest and travels along the western edge of Villa Hills, which is slightly to the east of the Boone County line. It curves to the north-northeast and re-enters Villa Hills proper. It then meets its northern terminus, an intersection with KY 8 (River Road).

== Major intersections ==
The entire route is in Kenton County.

Location	mi	km	Destinations	Notes
Fort Wright	0.000	0.000	KY 17 (Madison Pike)	Southern terminus
Fort Mitchell	1.817	2.924	US 25 north / US 42 east / US 127 north (Dixie Highway) – Cincinnati	Southern end of US 25/US 42/US 127 concurrency
Fort Mitchell–Lakeside Park line	1.817	2.924	US 25 south / US 42 west / US 127 south (Dixie Highway) to I-275 – Florence	Eastern end of US 25/US 42/US 127 concurrency
Fort Mitchell–Crescent Springs line	2.797	4.501	I-71 / I-75 to I-275 – Lexington, Louisville, Cincinnati	I-71/I-75 exit 186
Crescent Springs	3.244	5.221	KY 2373 (Anderson Road)	
Villa Hills	6.947	11.180	KY 8 (River Road)	Northern terminus
1.000 mi = 1.609 km; 1.000 km = 0.621 mi: Concurrency terminus
