= Atwood, Kentucky =

Unincorporated community in Kentucky, United States

- Unincorporated community
- Location within Kentucky Location within the United States
- Coordinates: 38°52′20″N 84°32′18″W
- Country: United States
- State: Kentucky
- County: Kenton
- Elevation: 886 ft (270 m)
- Time zone: UTC-6 (Central (CST))
  - Summer (DST): UTC-5 (CDT)
- Area code: 859
- GNIS feature ID: 486128

Atwood is an unincorporated community in Kenton County, Kentucky, United States. The community is located on Kentucky Route 17 south of Nicholson.

The community has the name of Atwood C. Bird (1867–1960), a local banker and farmer.
