= Kentucky Route 1072 =

State highway in Kentucky, United States

Kentucky Route 1072

Route information
- Maintained by KYTC
- Length: 5.174 mi (8.327 km)

Major junctions
- South end: Megellan Road/Howe Road near Fort Wright
- KY 17 in Fort Wright; I-71 / I-75 near Fort Wright; US 25 / US 42 / US 127 near Fort Wright
- North end: KY 8 in Ludlow

Location
- Country: United States
- State: Kentucky
- Counties: Kenton

Highway system
- Kentucky State Highway System; Interstate; US; State; Parkways
← KY 1071	→ KY 1073

Kentucky Route 1072 (KY 1072) is 5.019-mile-long (8.077 km) state highway in the Northern Kentucky area.

== Route description ==
KY 1072 begins at a roundabout with Megellan Road and Howe Road near a Fidelity Investments office building near Fort Wright, heading northwest on two-lane undivided Highland Pike. The road curves southwest and northwest again through wooded areas and comes to a bridge over a CSX railroad line. The route widens to four lanes and comes to an intersection with KY 17 in a commercial area. KY 1072 becomes a five-lane road with a center left-turn lane and passes more businesses. The route narrows to three lanes with two northbound lanes and one southbound lane as it heads north through woodland. The road curves to the northeast and passes through residential neighborhoods and comes to an intersection with the western terminus of KY 3187. Here, KY 1072 heads north as Kyles Lane, a three-lane road with a center left-turn lane that passes more homes. The route widens into a four-lane road as it comes to an interchange with Interstate 71 (I-71) and I-75. Immediately after, the road intersects U.S. Route 25 (US 25), US 42, and US 127 in a commercial area.

At this point, KY 1072 turns northeast to form a brief concurrency with US 25/US 42/US 127 on Dixie Highway. KY 1072 splits by heading north onto two-lane undivided Sleepy Hollow Road and passes homes. The road winds north into wooded areas and curves to the northwest. The route passes under a Norfolk Southern railroad line and heads into Ludlow. Here, KY 1072 passes residences before coming to its northern terminus at KY 8 near the Ohio River.

== Major intersections ==
The entire route is in Kenton County.

Location	mi	km	Destinations	Notes
Covington	0.000	0.000	Megellan Road/Howe Road	Rounabout
Fort Wright	0.731	1.176	KY 17 (Madison Pike)	
Fort Wright	2.157	3.471	KY 3187 east (Kyles Lane)	Western terminus of KY 3187
Fort Wright	2.580– 2.732	4.152– 4.397	I-71 / I-75 – Cincinnati, Louisville, Lexington	I-71/I-75 exit 189
Fort Wright	2.854	4.593	US 25 south / US 42 south / US 127 south (Dixie Highway)	South end of US 25 / US 42 / US 127 concurrency
Fort Wright	3.009	4.843	US 25 north / US 42 north / US 127 north (Dixie Highway)	North end of US 25 / US 42 / US 127 concurrency
Fort Wright	3.403	5.477	KY 2372 south (Amsterdam Road)	Northern terminus of unsigned KY 2372
Ludlow	5.174	8.327	KY 8 (Elm Street)	
1.000 mi = 1.609 km; 1.000 km = 0.621 mi: Concurrency terminus
