= Latonia, Covington =

Neighborhood in Covington, Kentucky

Latonia
- Neighborhood Of Covington
- Interactive map of Latonia
- Coordinates: 39.0473361°N 84.5031192°W
- Incorporated: 1896
- Annexed: 1909
- Named for: Lettonian Springs
- Postal code: 41015
- Area code: 859

Latonia is a former city, now neighborhood of Covington in Kenton County, Kentucky, United States.

Latonia, not to be confused with the neighboring community of Latonia Lakes, is located in the southern part of the city of Covington. It includes residential, commercial and manufacturing areas.

== History ==
The Lettonian Springs were a popular resort place in the 19th century. These springs gave their name to the Latonia Race Track, one of the South's premier thoroughbred racing facilities from 1883 to 1939. The Latonia track drew the best horses, jockeys and trainers to its events. The Latonia Race Track was later reopened in Florence, KY in 1959 and changed its name to Turfway Race track in 1982. The Latonia Shopping Center now occupies most of the original Latonia Race Track site.

Latonia was annexed to Covington in 1909.

== In Media ==
- Car chase scenes for the movie The Old Man & the Gun were filmed in Latonia, by Holy Cross High School.

== Notable people ==
- Robert S. Allen, journalist and colonel
