= Nicholson, Kentucky =

Unincorporated community in Kentucky, United States

Coordinates: 38.9071°N 84.5482°W

Nicholson is an unincorporated community in Kenton County, Kentucky, United States, located directly south of Independence.

== Geography ==
Nicholson is centered at the intersection of Kentucky Routes 17 and 16.

== Government ==
Emergency Medical Services, fire prevention and suppression is provided by the Independence Fire District with policing provided by the Kenton County Police.

== Library ==
The William E. Durr branch of the Kenton County Public Library is located in the Nicholson area. Opened in January 2007, it replaced the Independence Branch (1994–2006) on Taylor Mill Road. Its collection includes over 100,000 items.
