= Verona, Kentucky =

Unincorporated community in Kentucky, United States

- Census-designated place (CDP)
- Location within Boone County and the state of Kentucky
- Coordinates: 38°48′44″N 84°39′53″W
- Country: United States
- State: Kentucky
- County: Boone

Area
  - Total: 12.33 sq mi (31.94 km^{2})
  - Land: 12.24 sq mi (31.70 km^{2})
  - Water: 0.093 sq mi (0.24 km^{2})
- Elevation: 866 ft (264 m)

Population (2020)
  - Total: 1,545
  - Density: 126.2/sq mi (48.74/km^{2})
- Time zone: UTC-5 (Eastern (EST))
  - Summer (DST): UTC-4 (EDT)
- ZIP code: 41092
- Area code: 859
- FIPS code: 21-79464
- GNIS feature ID: 2629699

Verona is an unincorporated community and census-designated place (CDP) in Boone County, Kentucky, United States. The population was 1,545 at the 2020 census.

== History ==
The Encyclopedia of Northern Kentucky states that the exact details regarding the community's settlement and its founders are unknown.

In its earlier times, Verona was "a thriving business community surrounded by farmlands". The community had a building supply store, a blacksmith, a bank, a creamery, grocery stores, a dry goods store, saloons, tobacco shops, a barber shop, a funeral home, a jail and a post office. The community's post office was opened on March 24, 1834, and Verona was incorporated as a city in 1909. The city's incorporation later dissolved when the community's leadership became dormant. The Walton-Verona independent school district was established in 1954.

== Geography ==
The Verona CDP occupies the southern corner of Boone County, bordered by Interstate 71 to the northwest, by the Gallatin County line to the southwest, and by the Grant County line, following Bullock Pen Creek, to the south. The original hamlet of Verona is located at the intersection of Kentucky Routes 14 and 16, but the CDP includes a larger rural area surrounding the hamlet. It is 6 miles (10 km) northeast along Routes 14/16 to Walton and 27 miles (43 km) north to downtown Cincinnati. Walton has the middle and highschool of Walton Verona. Verona has the elementary school.

According to the United States Census Bureau, Verona has a total area of 12.3 square miles (31.9 km^{2}), of which 12.2 square miles (31.7 km^{2}) is land and 0.077 square miles (0.2 km^{2}), or 0.76%, is water.

== Demographics ==
Historical population
Census	Pop.	Note	%±
2020	1,545		—
U.S. Decennial Census

=== 2020 census ===
As of the 2020 census, Verona had a population of 1,545. The median age was 42.5 years. 25.5% of residents were under the age of 18 and 14.7% of residents were 65 years of age or older. For every 100 females there were 103.8 males, and for every 100 females age 18 and over there were 104.8 males age 18 and over.

0.0% of residents lived in urban areas, while 100.0% lived in rural areas.

There were 538 households in Verona, of which 34.2% had children under the age of 18 living in them. Of all households, 66.0% were married-couple households, 10.0% were households with a male householder and no spouse or partner present, and 18.8% were households with a female householder and no spouse or partner present. About 17.9% of all households were made up of individuals and 9.1% had someone living alone who was 65 years of age or older.

There were 574 housing units, of which 6.3% were vacant. The homeowner vacancy rate was 0.4% and the rental vacancy rate was 0.0%.

Racial composition as of the 2020 census
Race	Number	Percent
White	1,451	93.9%
Black or African American	8	0.5%
American Indian and Alaska Native	1	0.1%
Asian	12	0.8%
Native Hawaiian and Other Pacific Islander	0	0.0%
Some other race	10	0.6%
Two or more races	63	4.1%
Hispanic or Latino (of any race)	35	2.3%
