= Simon Kenton High School =

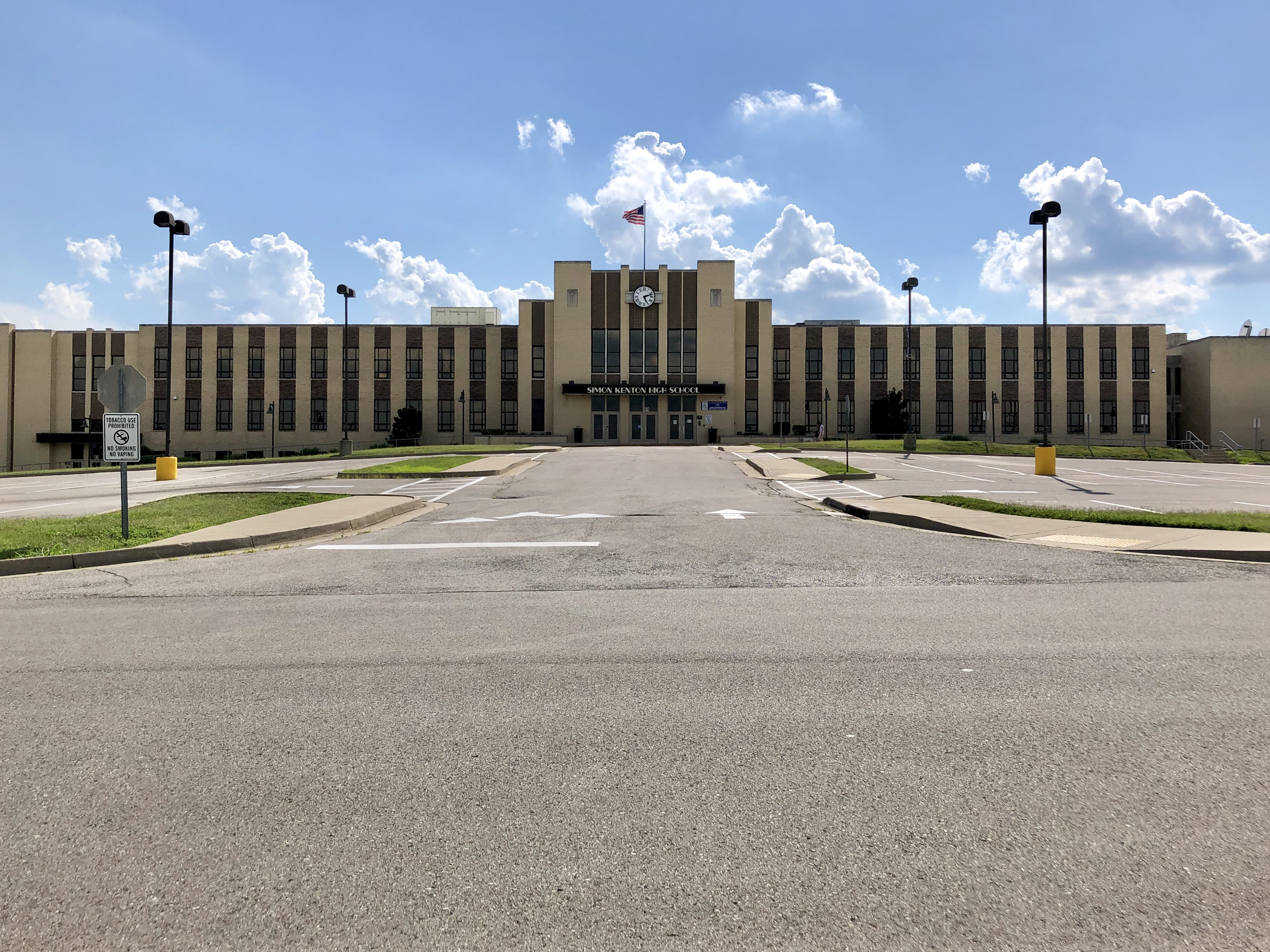

Location
- 11132 Madison Pike; Independence, Kentucky 41051; United States; 38.92428°N 84.54486°W

Information
- Type: Public School
- Opened: 1937
- School district: Kenton County School District
- Principal: Craig Reinhart
- Teaching staff: 84.00 (FTE)
- Grades: 9 to 12
- Enrollment: 1,882 (2023–2024)
- Student to teacher ratio: 22.40
- Color
- Nickname: Pioneers
- Website: https://simonkenton.kenton.kyschools.us/

Simon Kenton High School is a high school located at 11132 Madison Pike in Independence, Kentucky. The school's mascot is the Pioneers.

== History ==
On June 19, 1935, an application was filed with the Public Works Administration for Kenton County, Kentucky for funds to construct a public high school. The application was approved, and on November 2, 1935, a deed was signed for a 23-acre (93,000 m^{2}) site on Madison Pike, one-half mile south of the center of the city of Independence. A 5.5-acre (22,000 m^{2}) addition was added shortly thereafter to allow for the construction of a lake on-site to provide water for the school. The overall project's cost is recorded as $175,606.85.

The decision to name the school after famous Kentucky pioneer Simon Kenton, was made official on October 22, 1936, with the official dedication occurring September 5 of the same year. With an initial enrollment of 496 students, Simon Kenton High School opened its doors on September 13, 1937.

On October 9, 1980, a gas explosion killed a student and caused up to $2 million in damage.

The principal is Craig Reinhart.
