= Scott High School (Kentucky) =

Coordinates: 38°59′48″N 84°30′26″W

- 5400 Old Taylor Mill Road Taylor Mill, KY 41015; United States

Information
- Type: Public School
- Motto: Soaring Above the Rest
- School district: Kenton County
- NCES District ID: 2103090
- Superintendent: Henry Webb
- NCES School ID: 210309000823
- Principal: Cody Wolf
- Teaching staff: 48.00 (FTE)
- Grades: 9 to 12
- Enrollment: 1,020 (2023–2024)
- Student to teacher ratio: 21.25
- Campus size: 78 Acres
- Colors: Blue and Grey
- Team name: Eagles
- Feeder schools: Woodland Middle School
- Website: https://scott.kenton.kyschools.us/

Scott High School is located at 5400 Old Taylor Mill Road in Taylor Mill, Kentucky. The school's athletic teams are known as the "Eagles". The school is one of three high schools operated by the Kenton County School District.

== History ==
It opened for classes in 1978, where it originally featured an open classroom design. Scott High School sits on a 78-acre (320,000 m^{2}) campus that is shared with Woodland Middle School which was built in 1988. The campus includes a football field, softball and two baseball fields, lighted soccer field, tennis courts and is the only high school in Kenton County with an indoor pool. Scott now has a new wing addition with additional rooms, bigger lockers, smart classrooms, etc. that finished in the summer of 2014. Scott has approximately 1100 students and 65 faculty members. As of the 2024–2025 school year, Cody Wolf is the new Interim Principal. Starting in 2012, the school has undergone massive renovation and construction including multiple new wings, which added a new cafeteria and library, as well as smart classrooms. The most recent addition was completed before the start of the 2024–2025 school year. As of the 2023–2024 school year, more additions are being made which include a new gymnasium, theater, and pool.

In October 2024, then principal Anthony Procaccino was investigated by Kenton County police after they obtained footage of him serving alcoholic beverages to minors at his home nearly a year prior on New Year's Eve, 2023. He was soon after placed on leave and Cody Wolf stepped in as interim principal; Wolf became the full time principal when Procaccino resigned that December. In January 2025, Procaccino was allowed by a judge to complete 12 hours of community service and a critical thinking class to avoid prosecution, which his attorney claims he has completed.

== Notable alumni ==
Jacob Bumpass - Convicted Murderer

Doug Pelfrey - Bengal's kicker

Carly Pearce - Country Singer
