= Kris Knochelmann =

American politician

Judge/Executive of Kenton County
- Incumbent
- Assumed office January 5, 2015
- Preceded by: Steve Arlinghaus

Kenton County Commissioner from the 3rd district
- In office January 1, 2007 – January 5, 2015
- Preceded by: Adam Koenig
- Succeeded by: Joe Nienaber Jr.

Personal details
- Born: Covington
- Political party: Republican

Kris Knochelmann is an American politician from Kentucky who has served as the Judge/Executive of Kenton County since 2015. He previously served as a county commissioner from 2007 to 2015.

== Professional career ==
After graduating college, Knochelmann became general manager of Covington-based Knochelmann Plumbing, Heating & Air Conditioning, which was started by his father, John Knochelmann Sr. in 1968. Knochelmann and three other family members bought the business in 1991. And in 1997, the business merged with national HVAC contractor Service Experts, then was purchased by Lennox International in 2001.

In April 2011, he purchased Cincinnati-based Schneller Heating, Air Conditioning and Plumbing, alongside his wife, Lisa, for an undisclosed amount. Now named Schneller & Knochelmann Plumbing Heating Air, the business dates back to 1928 and employs more than 100 team members throughout its offices in Covington and Cincinnati.

== Political career ==
Knochelmann was first elected to the Fiscal Court in 2006, taking office in January 2007.

He ran for Judge/Executive in 2014, defeating incumbent Steve Arlinghaus.

== Electoral history ==
=== 2010 ===
2010 Kenton County Commission 3rd district election
Party	Candidate	Votes	%
Republican	Kris Knochelmann (incumbent)	Unopposed	
Total votes		31,448	100.0
Republican hold			

=== 2014 ===
Republican primary results
Party	Candidate	Votes	%
Republican	Kris Knochelmann	7,113	53.9
Republican	Steve Arlinghaus (incumbent)	6,078	46.1
Total votes		13,191	100.0

2014 Kenton County Judge/Executive election
Party	Candidate	Votes	%
Republican	Kris Knochelmann	Unopposed	
Total votes		34,552	100.0
Republican hold			

=== 2018 ===
2018 Kenton County Judge/Executive election
Party	Candidate	Votes	%
Republican	Kris Knochelmann (incumbent)	Unopposed	
Total votes		39,206	100.0
Republican hold			

=== 2022 ===
2022 Kenton County Judge/Executive election
Party	Candidate	Votes	%
Republican	Kris Knochelmann (incumbent)	Unopposed	
Total votes		36,424	100.0
Republican hold			
