= Kentucky Route 14 =

State highway in Kentucky, United States

Kentucky Route 14
- KY 14 highlighted in red

Route information
- Maintained by KYTC
- Length: 17.209 mi (27.695 km)

Major junctions
- West end: US 42 / US 127 near Verona
- I-71 near Verona; I-75 in Walton; US 25 / KY 16 in Walton; US 25 in Bracht
- East end: KY 177 in Morning View

Location
- Country: United States
- State: Kentucky
- Counties: Boone, Kenton

Highway system
- Kentucky State Highway System; Interstate; US; State; Parkways
← KY 13	→ KY 15

Kentucky Route 14 (KY 14) is a 17.209-mile-long (27.695 km) state highway in Kentucky that runs from U.S. Route 42 (US 42) and US 127 in rural Boone County to KY 177 in the unincorporated community of Morning View.

== Route description ==
KY 14 begins heading toward the south and meets Interstate 71 before entering Verona. In Verona, KY 16 joins KY 14 and both head to the northeast. KY 14 and 16 meet Interstate 75 as the enter Walton. In downtown Walton, KY 14 meets US 25. KY 16 leaves KY 14 and heads north with US 25, while KY 14 heads south on US 25. KY 14 crosses into Kenton County before merging off of US 25 to the east in the unincorporated community of Bracht. KY 14 meets KY 17 in the unincorporated community of Piner before ending at KY 177 in the unincorporated community of Morning View on the Licking River

== Major intersections ==
County	Location	mi	km	Destinations	Notes
Boone		0.000	0.000	US 42 / US 127	Western terminus
Boone		2.205	3.549	I-71 – Cincinnati, Louisville	I-71 exit 72
Boone	Verona	3.982	6.408	KY 16 south (Glencoe-Verona Road) / KY 491 west (Lebanon-Crittenden Road)	West end of KY 16 overlap; eastern terminus of KY 491
Boone	Walton	8.056	12.965	KY 1292 west (Beaver Road) / Stephenson Mill Road	Eastern terminus of KY 1292
Boone	Walton	8.152	13.119	I-75 – Cincinnati, Lexington	I-75 exit 171
Boone	Walton	8.830	14.211	US 25 north / KY 16 north (North Main Street)	West end of US 25 overlap; East end of KY 16 overlap
Kenton		11.403	18.351	KY 2043 north (Green Road)	Southern terminus of KY 2043
Kenton		12.268	19.743	US 25 south (Dixie Highway)	East end of US 25 overlap
Kenton		14.259	22.948	KY 3083 south (Parkers Grove Road)	Northern terminus of KY 3083
Kenton	Piner	15.532	24.996	KY 17 (Madison Pike)	
Kenton		18.675	30.054	KY 3072 west (Hempfling Road)	Eastern terminus of KY 3072
Kenton		20.096	32.341	KY 2046 west (Fiskburg Road)	Eastern terminus of KY 2046
Kenton	Morning View	20.647	33.228	KY 177 (Decoursey Pike) / Rich Road	Eastern terminus; continues east as Rich Road
1.000 mi = 1.609 km; 1.000 km = 0.621 mi
