= Kentucky Route 159 =

State highway in Kentucky, United States

Kentucky Route 159

Route information
- Maintained by KYTC
- Length: 13.179 mi (21.210 km)

Major junctions
- South end: KY 22 near Falmouth
- East end: AA Hwy (KY 9) near Foster

Location
- Country: United States
- State: Kentucky
- Counties: Pendleton

Highway system
- Kentucky State Highway System; Interstate; US; State; Parkways
← KY 158	→ KY 160

Kentucky Route 159 (KY 159) is a 13.179-mile-long (21.210 km) state highway in Pendleton County, Kentucky. It runs from KY 22 just east of Falmouth to KY 9 (AA Highway) northwest of Foster.

== Major intersections ==
The entire route is in Pendleton County.

Location	mi	km	Destinations	Notes
	0.000	0.000	KY 22	Western terminus
	0.822	1.323	KY 3173 east (Falmouth-Brooksville Road)	Western terminus of KY 3173
	3.869	6.227	KY 609 east	Western terminus of KY 609
	8.351	13.440	KY 177 north	Southern terminus of KY 177
	10.540	16.962	KY 10 east	South end of KY 10 overlap
	10.791	17.366	KY 10 west	North end of KY 10 overlap
	13.179	21.210	AA Hwy (KY 9)	Northern terminus
1.000 mi = 1.609 km; 1.000 km = 0.621 mi
