= Interstate 275 (Ohio–Indiana–Kentucky) =

Highway in the United States

Interstate 275
- Cincinnati Bypass
- I-275 highlighted in red

Route information
- Auxiliary route of I-75
- Length: 83.71 mi (134.72 km)
- Existed: 1962–present
- NHS: Entire route

Major junctions
- Beltway around Cincinnati, Ohio
- I-71 / I-75 in Erlanger, KY; US 50 in Lawrenceburg, IN; I-74 / US 52 near Miamitown, OH; I-75 in Sharonville, OH; I-71 in Montgomery, OH; US 22 / SR 3 in Montgomery, OH; SR 28 in Milford, OH; SR 32 near Mount Carmel, OH; I-471 in Highland Heights, KY

Location
- Country: United States
- States: Kentucky, Indiana, Ohio
- Counties: KY: Kenton, Boone, Campbell; IN: Dearborn; OH: Hamilton, Clermont

Highway system
- Interstate Highway System; Main; Auxiliary; Suffixed; Business; Future
- Indiana State Highway System; Interstate; US; State; Scenic
- Kentucky State Highway System; Interstate; US; State; Parkways
- Ohio State Highway System; Interstate; US; State; Scenic
| ← SR 269 | IN | → SR 301 |
| ← KY 274 | KY | → KY 276 |
| ← SR 274 | OH | → SR 275 |

Interstate 275 (I-275) is an 83.71-mile-long (134.72 km) highway in Ohio, Indiana, and Kentucky that forms a complete beltway around the Cincinnati metropolitan area and includes a part in a state (Indiana) not entered by the parent route. It had been the only auxiliary Interstate that enters three states, but that changed in July 2018 when I-295 in Delaware and New Jersey was extended into Pennsylvania. It is the longest beltway with an Interstate highway designation in the United States, enclosing an area of over 250,000 acres (100,000 ha). It is also the third longest beltway overall in the United States; only the Sam Houston Tollway and the Grand Parkway, both encircling Greater Houston, are longer. For a short distance in northwest Hamilton County, it runs concurrently with I-74 and US Route 52 (US 52). It also runs concurrently with US 52 very briefly in southern Hamilton County.

I-275 is also known as the Cincinnati Bypass and officially known as the Donald H. Rolf Circle Freeway in Ohio, after a state senator, but locals rarely use these names, instead simply referring to it as "275" or "the loop". In 2011, Kentucky named its segment the Ronald Reagan Highway, not to be confused with Ronald Reagan Cross County Highway across the river in Cincinnati. The section in Clermont County is also designated as the Staff Sergeant Matt Maupin Veterans Memorial Highway.

== Route description ==
=== I-71/I-75 to Indiana ===
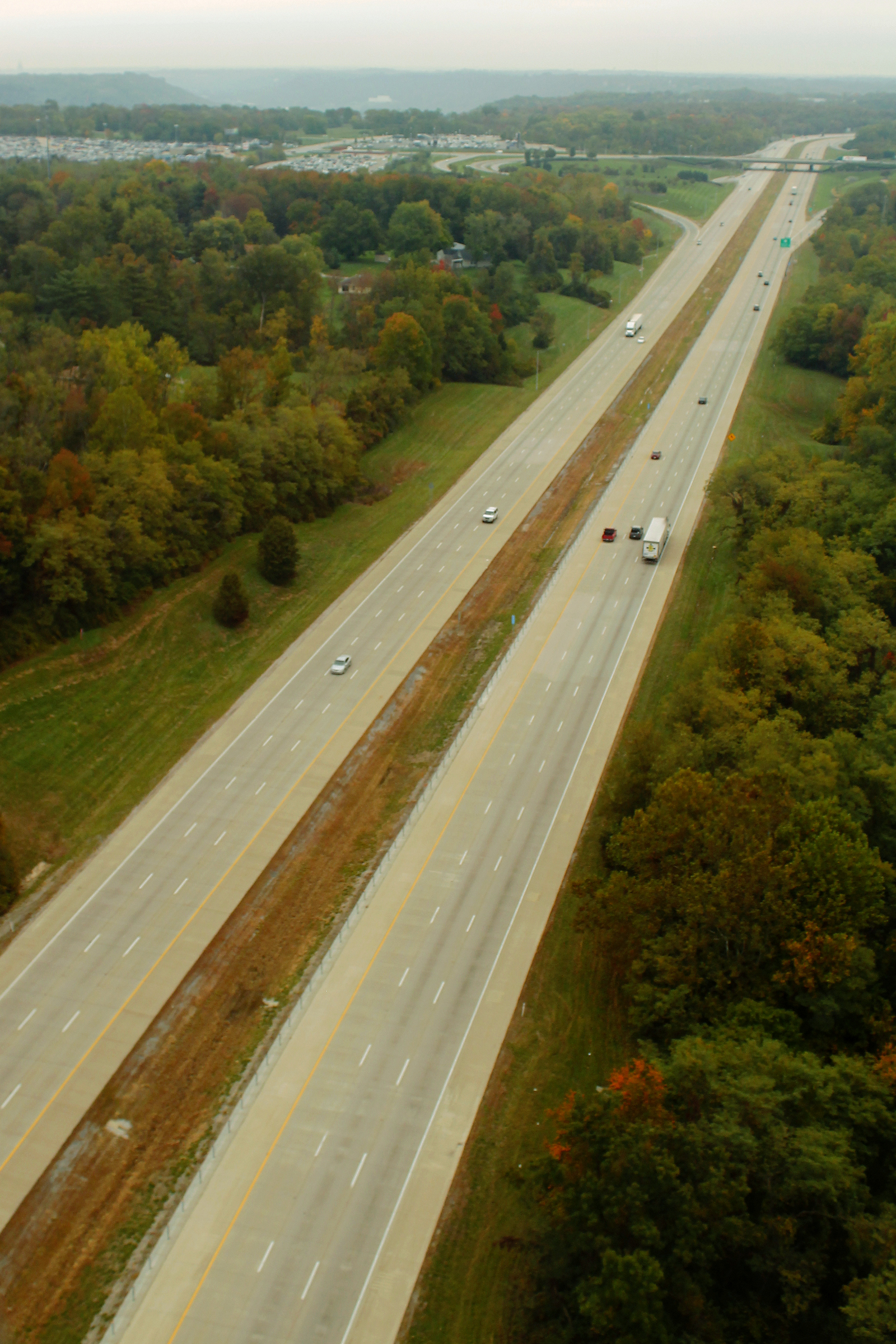
Aerial view of I-275 near Cincinnati/Northern Kentucky International Airport

I-275 heads west toward Indiana, passing by Cincinnati/Northern Kentucky International Airport, with Kentucky Route 212 (KY 212) used as the service road to and from the airport. Then, near Hebron, west of the airport, I-275 has an interchange with KY 237, before passing over the Ohio River into Indiana.

=== Indiana ===
In Indiana, I-275 passes through a rural area with only one interchange at US 50/State Road 1 (SR 1). I-275 heads northeast toward Ohio; at the Ohio state line, I-275 passes over US 50.

=== Ohio ===
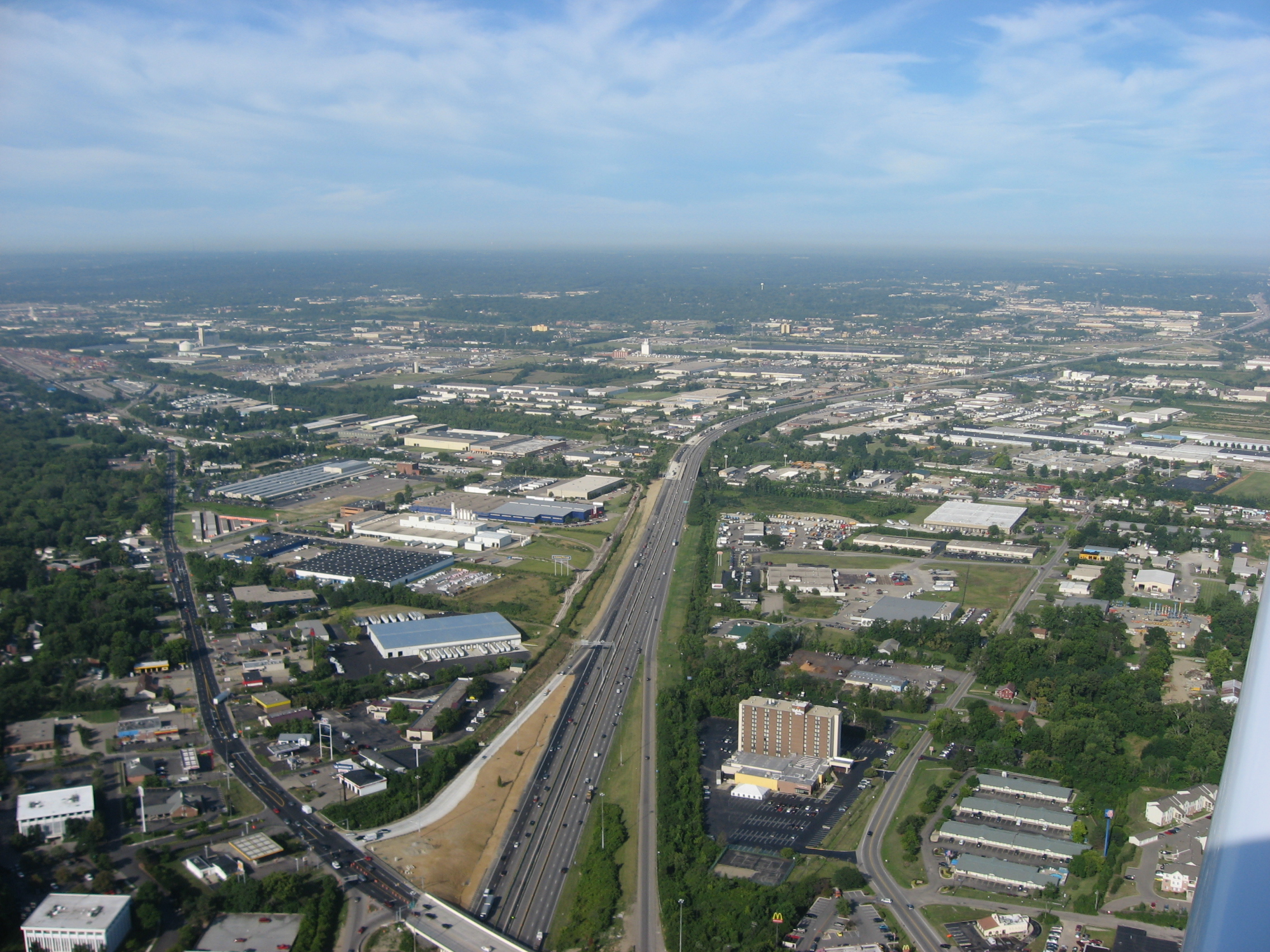
Along I-275 on its northeast side

I-275 heads northeast toward Springdale, and I-275 runs concurrently with I-74 and US 52. When the concurrency ends, I-275 has an intersection with State Route 126 (SR 126, Ronald Reagan Cross County Highway). Then, I-275 has interchanges with US 27 and US 127. I-275 turns east, having an interchange with SR 4, SR 747, I-75, and US 42. I-275 turns southeast, having an interchange with I-71 and US 22/SR 3. I-275 passes over the Little Miami River, entering Clermont County, where it is officially named in honor of Keith Matthew Maupin, a local soldier killed during the Iraq War. I-275 turns due south toward Milford and connects with SR 28, SR 450, SR 32, and SR 125. I-275 turns due west toward Kentucky, passing through a short concurrency with US 52, before crossing over the Ohio River into Kentucky.

=== Ohio to I-71/I-75 ===
From Ohio, I-275 heads southwest toward Highland Heights. I-275 has an interchange with I-471 near Highland Heights. I-275 turns due west toward Crestview Hills, passing through an interchange with KY 9, KY 16, and KY 17. In Crestview Hills, I-275 has an interchange with US 25/US 42/US 127. I-275 turns northwest toward I-71/I-75.

== History ==
=== I-74/I-275 bridge crash ===
On May 20, 2008, a tractor-trailer hauling a locomotive separated while traveling on the ramp from westbound I-74 to southbound I-275. After the trailer detached, it crashed into supports for the bridge on I-74 eastbound going over the ramps between I-275 and I-74 westbound. As a result, the Ohio Department of Transportation (ODOT) shut down eastbound I-74 for several weeks. Both ramps between I-74 west and I-275 were closed as well because of fears the bridge would collapse, but two crossovers were built so that traffic could use one lane of westbound I-74 to travel east around the damaged bridge.

== Exit list ==
| State | County | Location | mi | km | Exit | Destinations | Notes |
|---|---|---|---|---|---|---|---|
| Kentucky | Kenton | Erlanger | 83.780 0.000 | 134.831 0.000 | 84 | I-71 / I-75 – Louisville, Lexington, Cincinnati | I-71/75 exit 185 |
| Kentucky | Boone | | 2.027 | 3.262 | 2 | Mineola Pike | |
| Kentucky | Boone | | 3.969 | 6.387 | 4 | KY 212 to KY 20 – Cincinnati/Northern Kentucky International Airport | Signed as exits 4A (east) and 4B (west) westbound |
| Kentucky | Boone | Hebron | 7.028 | 11.310 | 6 | KY 237 (North Bend Road) – Hebron | Signed as exits 6A (north) and 6B (south) westbound; former exit 8; exit 7 until 2001 |
| Kentucky | Boone | Hebron | | | 8 | Graves Road | Opened in November 2020 |
| Kentucky | Boone | Idlewild | 11.427 | 18.390 | 11 | KY 3608 to KY 20 – Petersburg | I-275 west becomes north inner; I-275 south becomes east outer |
| Ohio River | | | 13.858 | 22.302 | Carroll Lee Cropper Bridge; Kentucky–Indiana state line | | |
| Indiana | Dearborn | Lawrenceburg Township | 15.13 | 24.35 | 16 | SR 1 north to US 50 – Lawrenceburg, Greendale, Aurora, Brookville | Southern terminus of SR 1; access to Hollywood Casino Lawrenceburg, Rising Star Casino and Belterra Casino |
| | | | 17.02 | 27.39 | Indiana–Ohio state line | | |
| Ohio | Hamilton | Whitewater Township | 20.99 | 33.78 | 21 | Kilby Road – Harrison | |
| Ohio | Hamilton | Whitewater Township | 24.24 | 39.01 | 25 | I-74 west / US 52 west – Indianapolis | Southern end of I-74 / US 52 concurrency; I-74 exit 5 |
| Ohio | Hamilton | Whitewater Township | 27.02 | 43.48 | 27 | SR 128 (Hamilton–Cleves Road) – Hamilton, Cleves | I-275 north becomes east inner; I-275 west becomes south outer |
| Ohio | Hamilton | Colerain Township | 27.82 | 44.77 | 28 | I-74 east / US 52 east – Cincinnati | Eastern end of I-74 / US 52 concurrency; I-74 exit 9 |
| Ohio | Hamilton | Colerain Township | 30.47– 30.91 | 49.04– 49.74 | 31 | Ronald Reagan Cross County Highway east / Blue Rock Road | Complete access formed by two partial interchanges: eastbound exit and westbound entrance at Ronald Reagan Cross County Highway; westbound exit and eastbound, westbound entrances at Blue Rock Road |
| Ohio | Hamilton | Colerain Township | 33.04 | 53.17 | 33 | US 27 / SR 126 (Colerain Avenue) – Oxford | Access to Northgate Mall |
| Ohio | Hamilton | Colerain Township–Springfield Township– Forest Park tripoint | 36.40– 37.05 | 58.58– 59.63 | 36 | US 127 (Hamilton Avenue) – Forest Park, Fairfield | |
| Ohio | Hamilton | Forest Park | 38.25 | 61.56 | 39 | Winton Road – Fairfield, Greenhills | Access to Forest Fair Village; westbound exit is split into separate north and south exits attached via collector/distributor lane |
| Ohio | Hamilton | Springdale | 40.40 | 65.02 | 41 | SR 4 (Dixie Highway) – Springdale, Fairfield, Hamilton | |
| Ohio | Hamilton | Springdale | 41.40 | 66.63 | 42 | SR 747 (Princeton Pike) – Springdale, Glendale | Signed as exits 42A (south) and 42B (north) westbound; access to Tri-County Mall |
| Ohio | Hamilton | Sharonville | 42.74 | 68.78 | 43 | I-75 (Millcreek Expressway) – Dayton, Cincinnati | Signed as exits 43A (south) and 43B (north); I-75 exit 16 |
| Ohio | Hamilton | Sharonville | 43.47 | 69.96 | 44 | Mosteller Road – Sharonville | |
| Ohio | Hamilton | Sharonville | 45.36 | 73.00 | 46 | US 42 (Lebanon Road) – Sharonville, West Chester, Mason | |
| Ohio | Hamilton | Sharonville | 46.81 | 75.33 | 47 | Reed Hartman Highway – Sharonville, Blue Ash | |
| Ohio | Hamilton | Montgomery | 48.24 | 77.63 | 49 | I-71 – Columbus, Cincinnati | I-71 north exit 17, south exits 17A-B; signed as exits 49A (south) & 49B (north) westbound |
| Ohio | Hamilton | Sycamore Township–Montgomery line | 49.22 | 79.21 | 50 | US 22 / SR 3 (Montgomery Road) – Montgomery, Morrow | |
| Ohio | Hamilton | Symmes Township | 51.86 | 83.46 | 52 | Loveland–Madeira Road – Loveland, Indian Hill, Madeira | |
| Ohio | Clermont | Miami Township | 54.30 | 87.39 | 54 | Wards Corner Road | I-275 east becomes south inner; I-275 north becomes west outer |
| Ohio | Clermont | Miami Township | 57.31 | 92.23 | 57 | SR 28 – Milford, Blanchester | |
| Ohio | Clermont | Union Township | 59.20 | 95.27 | 59 | SR 450 (Milford Parkway) to US 50 – Milford, Hillsboro | Signed as exits 59A (west) and 59B (east); southbound exit uses collector/distributor lane |
| Ohio | Clermont | Union Township | 63.42 | 102.06 | 63 | SR 32 – Newtown, Batavia | Access to Eastgate Mall |
| Ohio | Clermont | Union Township | 65.91 | 106.07 | 65 | SR 125 (Ohio Pike) – Amelia | I-275 south becomes west inner; I-275 east becomes north outer |
| Ohio | Hamilton | Anderson Township | 68.83 | 110.77 | 69 | Five Mile Road | |
| Ohio | Hamilton | Anderson Township | 70.95 | 114.18 | 71 | US 52 east (Kellogg Avenue) – New Richmond | Eastern end of US 52 concurrency |
| Ohio | Hamilton | Cincinnati | 72.64 | 116.90 | 72 | US 52 west (Kellogg Avenue) – Cincinnati | Western end of US 52 concurrency; access to Belterra Park |
| Ohio River | | | 73.061 | 117.580 | Combs–Hehl Bridge; Ohio–Kentucky state line | | |
| Kentucky | Campbell | Highland Heights | 74.857 | 120.471 | 74 | I-471 north / KY 471 south to US 27 – Cincinnati, Alexandria, Highland Heights | Southern terminus of I-471, exits 1A-B; northern terminus of KY-471; signed as exits 74A (south) and 74B (north) |
| Kentucky | Campbell | Highland Heights–Wilder line | 75.454 | 121.431 | 76 | Three Mile Road – Wilder, Northern Kentucky University | Access to Northern Kentucky University; eastbound exit and westbound entrance |
| Kentucky | Campbell | Wilder | 77.097 | 124.076 | 77 | AA Hwy (KY 9) – Wilder, Maysville, Alexandria | |
| Kentucky | Kenton | Taylor Mill | 78.779 | 126.783 | 79 | KY 16 (Taylor Mill Road) – Covington, Taylor Mill | |
| Kentucky | Kenton | Fort Wright | 79.970 | 128.699 | 80 | KY 17 (Madison Pike) – Covington, Independence | |
| Kentucky | Kenton | Crestview Hills | 82.030 | 132.014 | 82 | KY 1303 (Turkeyfoot Road) – Lakeside Park, Crestview Hills, | Access to Thomas More University; leads to Edgewood |
| Kentucky | Kenton | Crestview Hills | 82.503 | 132.776 | 83 | US 25 / US 42 / US 127 (Dixie Highway) – Erlanger, Florence | |
| Kentucky | Kenton | Erlanger | 83.780 0.000 | 134.831 0.000 | 84 | I-71 / I-75 – Louisville, Lexington, Cincinnati | |
1.000 mi = 1.609 km; 1.000 km = 0.621 mi: Concurrency terminus; Incomplete access
