= Ryland Heights, Kentucky =

- City
- Location in Kenton County, Kentucky
- Coordinates: 38°57′27″N 84°27′29″W
- Country: United States
- State: Kentucky
- County: Kenton
- Incorporated: 1972

Area
  - Total: 5.45 sq mi (14.11 km^{2})
  - Land: 5.24 sq mi (13.57 km^{2})
  - Water: 0.20 sq mi (0.53 km^{2})
- Elevation: 817 ft (249 m)

Population (2020)
  - Total: 922
  - Density: 176.0/sq mi (67.94/km^{2})
- Time zone: UTC-5 (Eastern (EST))
  - Summer (DST): UTC-4 (EDT)
- ZIP code: 41015
- Area code: 859
- FIPS code: 21-67602
- GNIS feature ID: 2405385
- Website: https://cityofrylandheights.org/

Ryland Heights is a home rule-class city in Kenton County, Kentucky, in the United States. The population was 922 at the 2020 census.

== Geography ==
Ryland Heights is located in eastern Kenton County. It is bordered to the east by the Licking River, which forms the Campbell County line. Neighboring cities are Independence and Covington to the west, Fairview to the northwest, and Taylor Mill to the north. Kentucky Route 177 passes through the community, leading north 10 miles (16 km) to downtown Covington and south 17 miles (27 km) to Butler.

According to the United States Census Bureau, Ryland Heights has a total area of 5.29 square miles (13.71 km^{2}), of which 5.23 square miles (13.55 km^{2}) are land and 0.06 square miles (0.16 km^{2}), or 1.17%, are water.

== Demographics ==
Historical population
Census	Pop.	Note	%±
1980	252		—
1990	279		10.7%
2000	799		186.4%
2010	1,022		27.9%
2020	922		−9.8%
U.S. Decennial Census

As of the census of 2000, there were 799 people, 293 households, and 225 families residing in the city. The population density was 161.7 inhabitants per square mile (62.4/km^{2}). There were 309 housing units at an average density of 62.5 per square mile (24.1/km^{2}). The racial makeup of the city was 97.87% White, 0.38% African American, 0.63% Native American, 0.13% from other races, and 1.00% from two or more races. Hispanic or Latino of any race were 0.50% of the population.

There were 293 households, out of which 29.7% had children under the age of 18 living with them, 64.2% were married couples living together, 7.5% had a female householder with no husband present, and 23.2% were non-families. 19.5% of all households were made up of individuals, and 6.8% had someone living alone who was 65 years of age or older. The average household size was 2.73 and the average family size was 3.13.

In the city, the population was spread out, with 24.3% under the age of 18, 7.9% from 18 to 24, 29.2% from 25 to 44, 27.5% from 45 to 64, and 11.1% who were 65 years of age or older. The median age was 39 years. For every 100 females, there were 105.4 males. For every 100 females age 18 and over, there were 104.4 males.

The median income for a household in the city was $48,077, and the median income for a family was $55,781. Males had a median income of $35,938 versus $27,083 for females. The per capita income for the city was $19,043. About 5.7% of families and 8.7% of the population were below the poverty line, including 9.6% of those under age 18 and 9.2% of those age 65 or over.
