= Latonia Lakes, Kentucky =

Unincorporated community in Kentucky, United States

- Unincorporated community
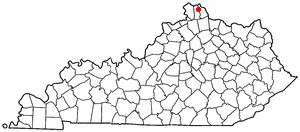
- Location of Latonia Lakes, Kentucky
- Coordinates: 38°58′6″N 84°29′55″W
- Country: United States
- State: Kentucky
- County: Kenton

Area
  - Total: 0.31 sq mi (0.8 km^{2})
  - Land: 0.31 sq mi (0.8 km^{2})
  - Water: 0 sq mi (0.0 km^{2})
- Elevation: 863 ft (263 m)

Population (2000)
  - Total: 325
  - Density: 1,093/sq mi (422.2/km^{2})
- Time zone: UTC-5 (Eastern (EST))
  - Summer (DST): UTC-4 (EDT)
- ZIP code: 41015
- Area code: 859
- FIPS code: 21-44038
- GNIS feature ID: 0496000

Latonia Lakes is a former city in Kenton County, Kentucky, United States. The population was 325 at the 2000 census. The city voted to be dissolved in the general elections on November 7, 2006, although the results were contested due to alleged voting irregularities. Following the certification of the election results, the city was officially dissolved on December 16, 2006.

== Geography ==
According to the United States Census Bureau, the city had a total area of 0.3 square miles (0.78 km^{2}), all land.

== Demographics ==
As of the census of 2000, there were 325 people, 113 households, and 88 families residing in the city. The population density was 1,093.5 inhabitants per square mile (422.2/km^{2}). There were 124 housing units at an average density of 417.2 per square mile (161.1/km^{2}). The racial makeup of the city was 98.77% White, 0.31% Pacific Islander, 0.31% from other races, and 0.62% from two or more races. Hispanic or Latino of any race were 1.54% of the population.

There were 113 households, out of which 31.0% had children under the age of 18 living with them, 50.4% were married couples living together, 19.5% had a female householder with no husband present, and 22.1% were non-families. 20.4% of all households were made up of individuals, and 9.7% had someone living alone who was 65 years of age or older. The average household size was 2.88 and the average family size was 3.20.

In the city the population was spread out, with 25.5% under the age of 18, 10.8% from 18 to 24, 29.5% from 25 to 44, 23.4% from 45 to 64, and 10.8% who were 65 years of age or older. The median age was 36 years. For every 100 females, there were 111.0 males. For every 100 females age 18 and over, there were 112.3 males.

The median income for a household in the city was $23,333, and the median income for a family was $27,188. Males had a median income of $22,500 versus $18,125 for females. The per capita income for the city was $12,876. About 25.3% of families and 24.4% of the population were below the poverty line, including 32.6% of those under age 18 and 20.5% of those age 65 or over.
