= Kenton County Public Library =

Library system in Kentucky

Coordinates: 38.9064°N 84.5477°W

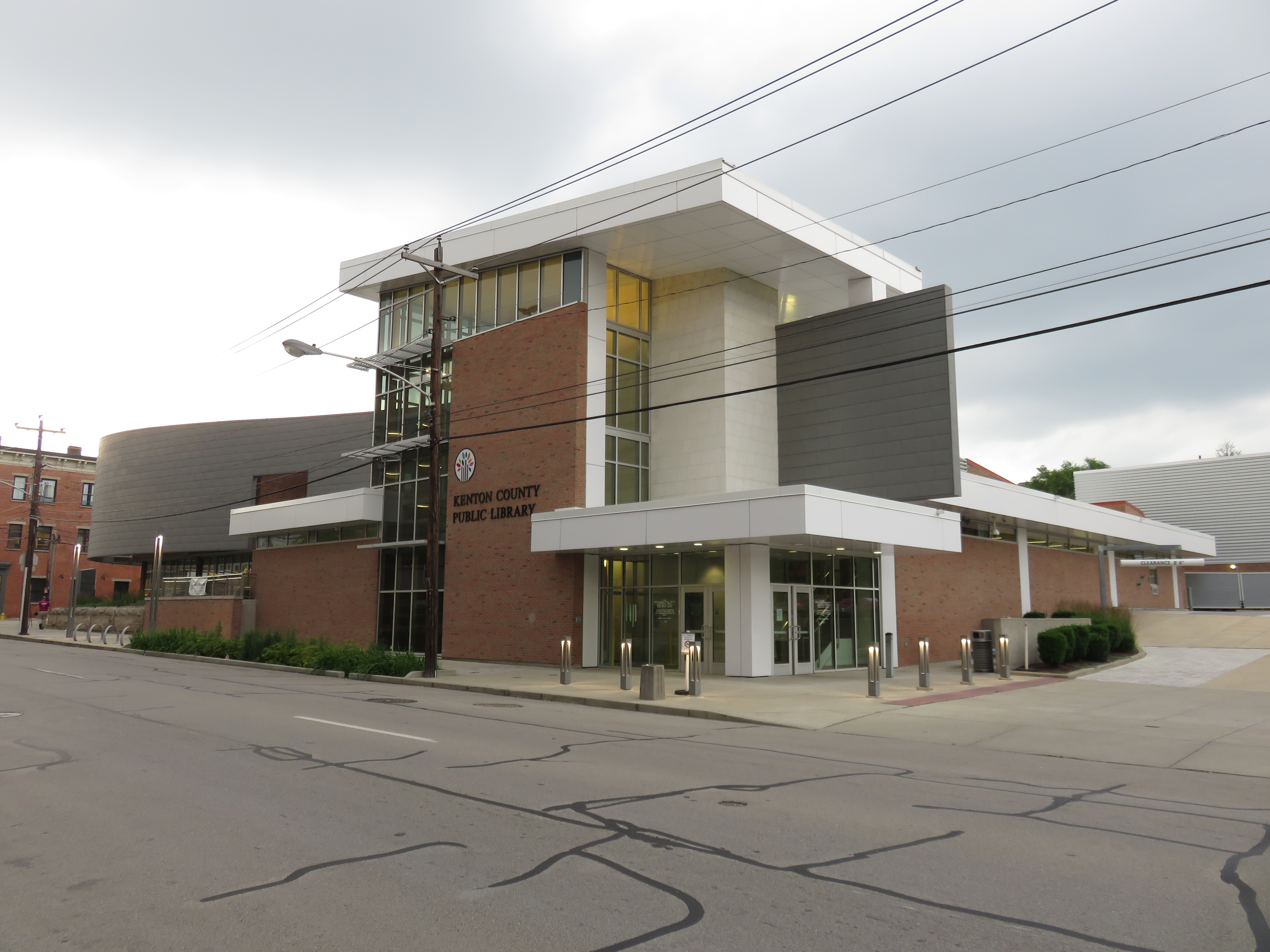
The Kenton County Public Library in Covington (2013)

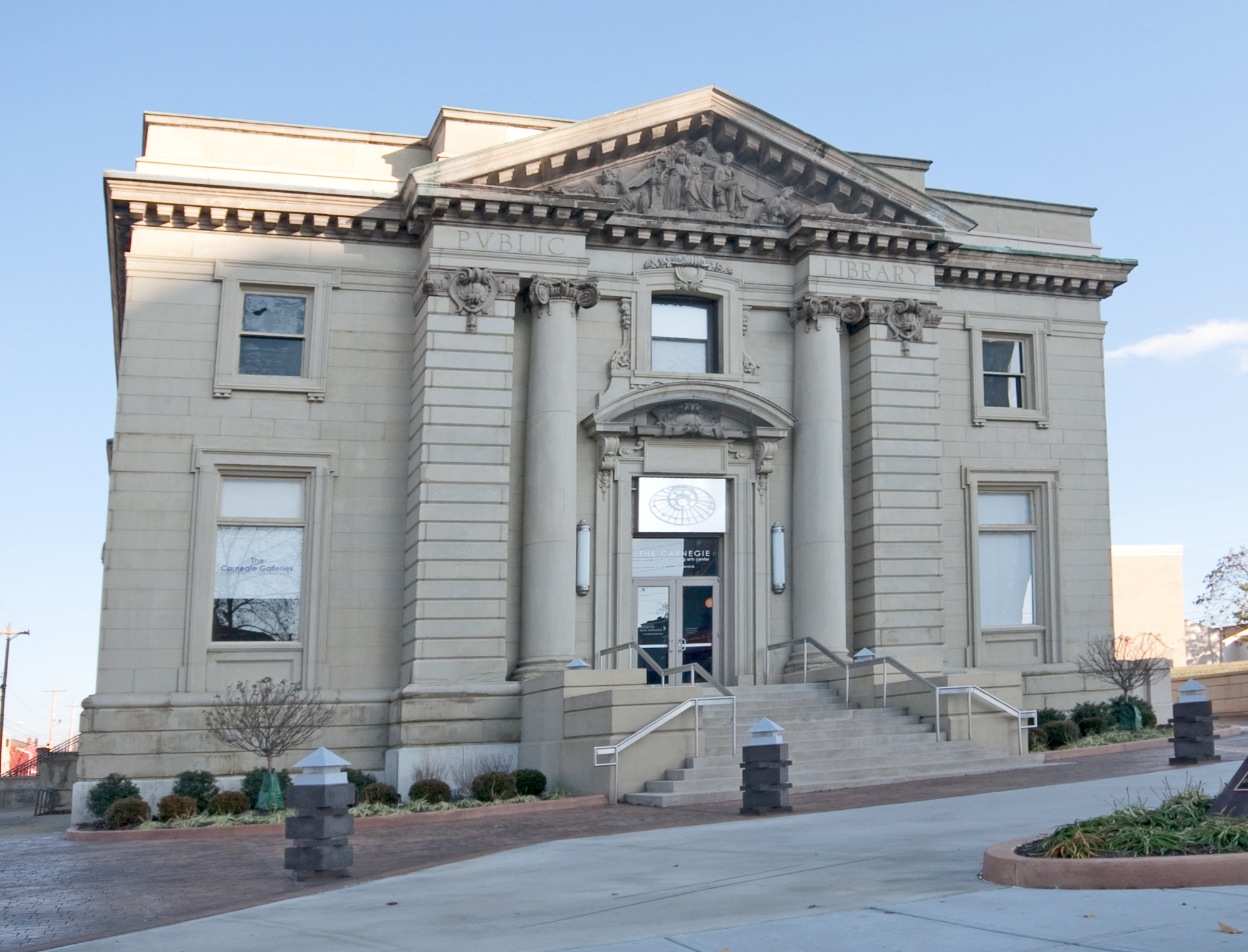
The original Covington Public Library (1904), currently in use by the Northern Kentucky Arts Council

The Kenton County Public Library is a library system serving the residents of Kenton County, Kentucky. The library ranked first in Kentucky in Hennen's American Public Library Ratings 2008.

The Covington Public Library was established in 1898. A donation from Andrew Carnegie gave the city a two-story Carnegie library, completed in 1904.
