= DeMossville, Kentucky =

Unincorporated community in Kentucky, United States

Coordinates: 38°48′18″N 84°25′01″W

DeMossville (or De Mossville) is an unincorporated community in Pendleton County, Kentucky, United States. It is situated along the Licking River, approximately thirty-five miles south of Cincinnati, Ohio by car. Despite being unincorporated, DeMossville has a post office with the ZIP code 41033.

The community was settled in 1852 and is named for the DeMoss family, of which Peter DeMoss, a French immigrant and veteran of the Revolutionary War, may have come to America with Lafayette.
