= Visalia, Kentucky =

Unincorporated community in Kentucky, United States

- Unincorporated community
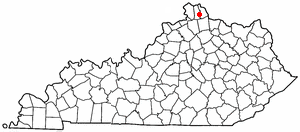
- Location of Visalia, Kentucky
- Coordinates: 38°54′54″N 84°26′59″W
- Country: United States
- State: Kentucky
- County: Kenton

Area
  - Total: 0.27 sq mi (0.7 km^{2})
  - Land: 0.27 sq mi (0.7 km^{2})
  - Water: 0 sq mi (0.0 km^{2})
- Elevation: 528 ft (161 m)

Population (2000)
  - Total: 111
  - Density: 413/sq mi (159.5/km^{2})
- Time zone: UTC-5 (Eastern (EST))
  - Summer (DST): UTC-4 (EDT)
- ZIP code: 41063
- Area code: 859
- FIPS code: 21-79878
- GNIS feature ID: 0506069

Visalia was a city in Kenton County, Kentucky, United States. The population was 111 at the 2000 census. The city government was dissolved in November 2006.

== History ==
Visalia is the namesake for its newer and larger western sister, Visalia, California. The founder of Visalia, California was named Nathaniel Vise, a man whose ancestral history is traced to the creation of Visalia, Kentucky.

Visalia was the county seat of Campbell County, Kentucky from 1823 to 1824. Visalia became part of Kenton County when Kenton County split from Campbell County in 1840.

== Geography ==
Visalia is located at 38°54′54″N 84°26′59″W (38.914923, -84.449698).

According to the United States Census Bureau, the city had a total area of 0.3 square miles (0.78 km^{2}), all land.

== Demographics ==
As of the census of 2000, there were 111 people, 45 households, and 31 families residing in the city. The population density was 413.2 inhabitants per square mile (159.5/km^{2}). There were 51 housing units at an average density of 189.8 per square mile (73.3/km^{2}). The racial makeup of the city was 95.50% White, and 4.50% from two or more races.

There were 45 households, out of which 22.2% had children under the age of 18 living with them, 53.3% were married couples living together, 8.9% had a female householder with no husband present, and 28.9% were non-families. 22.2% of all households were made up of individuals, and 11.1% had someone living alone who was 65 years of age or older. The average household size was 2.47 and the average family size was 2.84.

In the city the population was spread out, with 20.7% under the age of 18, 13.5% from 18 to 24, 23.4% from 25 to 44, 24.3% from 45 to 64, and 18.0% who were 65 years of age or older. The median age was 40 years. For every 100 females, there were 85.0 males. For every 100 females age 18 and over, there were 95.6 males.

The median income for a household in the city was $14,779, and the median income for a family was $25,000. Males had a median income of $21,250 versus $23,750 for females. The per capita income for the city was $14,049. There were 50.0% of families and 27.7% of the population living below the poverty line, including 100.0% of under eighteens and none of those over 64.
