= Taylor Mill, Kentucky =

- City
- Flag Seal
- Motto: "Taylored with Pride"
- Location in Kenton County, Kentucky
- Coordinates: 39°0′33″N 84°29′56″W
- Country: United States
- State: Kentucky
- County: Kenton
- Incorporated: 1956

Government
  - Type: Commission
  - Mayor: Daniel L. Bell
  - City Administrator: Brian Haney

Area
  - Total: 6.20 sq mi (16.07 km^{2})
  - Land: 6.11 sq mi (15.83 km^{2})
  - Water: 0.093 sq mi (0.24 km^{2})
- Elevation: 827 ft (252 m)

Population (2020)
  - Total: 6,873
  - Estimate (2022): 6,846
  - Density: 1,124.4/sq mi (434.13/km^{2})
- Time zone: UTC-5 (Eastern (EST))
  - Summer (DST): UTC-4 (EDT)
- ZIP code: 41015
- Area code: 859
- FIPS code: 21-75738
- GNIS feature ID: 2405573
- Website: www.taylormillky.gov

Taylor Mill is a home rule-class city in Kenton County, Kentucky, in the United States. The population was 6,873 at the 2020 census.

== History ==
The city was named for a local mill operated during the early 19th century by James Taylor Jr., the founder of Newport. In 1810 Taylor purchased the land from Jacob Fowler, and the road from what is now Covington to the mill was named Taylor's Mill Road. Others then moved onto the land, felling trees for lumber and clearing land for farming, which began the settling of the city of Taylor Mill.

In 1959 Taylor Mill annexed the former city of Sunny Acres, because its name confused newcomers who associated it with the fictional setting of an episode ("Shady Deal at Sunny Acres") from the popular TV series Maverick. In 1972 the voters of Taylor Mill and Winston Park voted to merge the two cities.

== Geography ==
Taylor Mill is located in northeastern Kenton County. It is bordered to the north, west, and south by the city of Covington and to the southeast by Fairview and Ryland Heights. An eastern strip of the city runs along the west side of the Licking River, which forms the border of Kenton County. Across the river in Campbell County are the cities of Wilder and Cold Spring.

Interstate 275, the beltway around Cincinnati, passes through the northern part of Taylor Mill, with access from Exit 79 (Kentucky Route 16). KY 16 leads north 5 miles (8 km) to downtown Covington and southwest 14 miles (23 km) to Walton.

According to the United States Census Bureau, Taylor Mill has a total area of 6.3 square miles (16.3 km^{2}), of which 6.1 square miles (15.9 km^{2}) are land and 0.2 square miles (0.4 km^{2}) are water.

== Demographics ==
=== 2020 census ===
As of the 2020 census, Taylor Mill had a population of 6,873. The median age was 40.5 years. 20.6% of residents were under the age of 18 and 17.1% of residents were 65 years of age or older. For every 100 females there were 98.1 males, and for every 100 females age 18 and over there were 96.5 males age 18 and over.

99.7% of residents lived in urban areas, while 0.3% lived in rural areas.

There were 2,802 households in Taylor Mill, of which 26.9% had children under the age of 18 living in them. Of all households, 52.1% were married-couple households, 17.2% were households with a male householder and no spouse or partner present, and 24.4% were households with a female householder and no spouse or partner present. About 25.7% of all households were made up of individuals and 9.3% had someone living alone who was 65 years of age or older.

There were 2,925 housing units, of which 4.2% were vacant. The homeowner vacancy rate was 0.9% and the rental vacancy rate was 5.6%.

Racial composition as of the 2020 census
Race	Number	Percent
White	6,220	90.5%
Black or African American	129	1.9%
American Indian and Alaska Native	19	0.3%
Asian	109	1.6%
Native Hawaiian and Other Pacific Islander	2	0.0%
Some other race	71	1.0%
Two or more races	323	4.7%
Hispanic or Latino (of any race)	158	2.3%

=== 2010 census ===
In 2010 there were 6,604 people and 2,759 housing units in the city, of which 134 were unoccupied.

Historical population
Census	Pop.	Note	%±
1960	710		—
1970	3,146		343.1%
1980	4,509		43.3%
1990	5,530		22.6%
2000	6,913		25.0%
2010	6,604		−4.5%
2020	6,873		4.1%
2024 (est.)	7,116		3.5%
U.S. Decennial Census

=== 2000 census ===
As of the 2000 census, there were 6,913 people, 2,552 households, and 1,942 families residing in the city. The population density was 1,104.8 inhabitants per square mile (426.6/km^{2}). There were 2,604 housing units at an average density of 416.2 per square mile (160.7/km^{2}). The racial makeup of the city was 97.95% White, 0.42% African American, 0.17% Native American, 0.65% Asian, 0.03% Pacific Islander, 0.14% from other races, and 0.64% from two or more races. Hispanic or Latino of any race were 0.78% of the population.

There were 2,552 households, out of which 37.4% had children under the age of 18 living with them, 62.9% were married couples living together, 9.6% had a female householder with no husband present, and 23.9% were non-families. 19.0% of all households were made up of individuals, and 6.9% had someone living alone who was 65 years of age or older. The average household size was 2.71 and the average family size was 3.13.

In the city, the population was spread out, with 26.4% under the age of 18, 9.3% from 18 to 24, 32.3% from 25 to 44, 21.6% from 45 to 64, and 10.4% who were 65 years of age or older. The median age was 36 years. For every 100 females, there were 96.0 males. For every 100 females age 18 and over, there were 93.6 males.

The median income for a household in the city was $54,069, and the median income for a family was $60,000. Males had a median income of $41,430 versus $29,423 for females. The per capita income for the city was $22,906. About 3.1% of families and 4.8% of the population were below the poverty line, including 5.6% of those under age 18 and 5.7% of those age 65 or over.

== Business district ==
The city has established a business district at the junction of I-275 and Taylor Mill Road. This area is termed The Districts of Taylor Mill and contains four development areas.

== Education ==
- Taylor Mill Elementary.
- Woodland Middle School
- Scott High School
- St. Anthony School

== Notable people ==
- Carly Pearce, country music singer
