= Walton, Kentucky =

- City
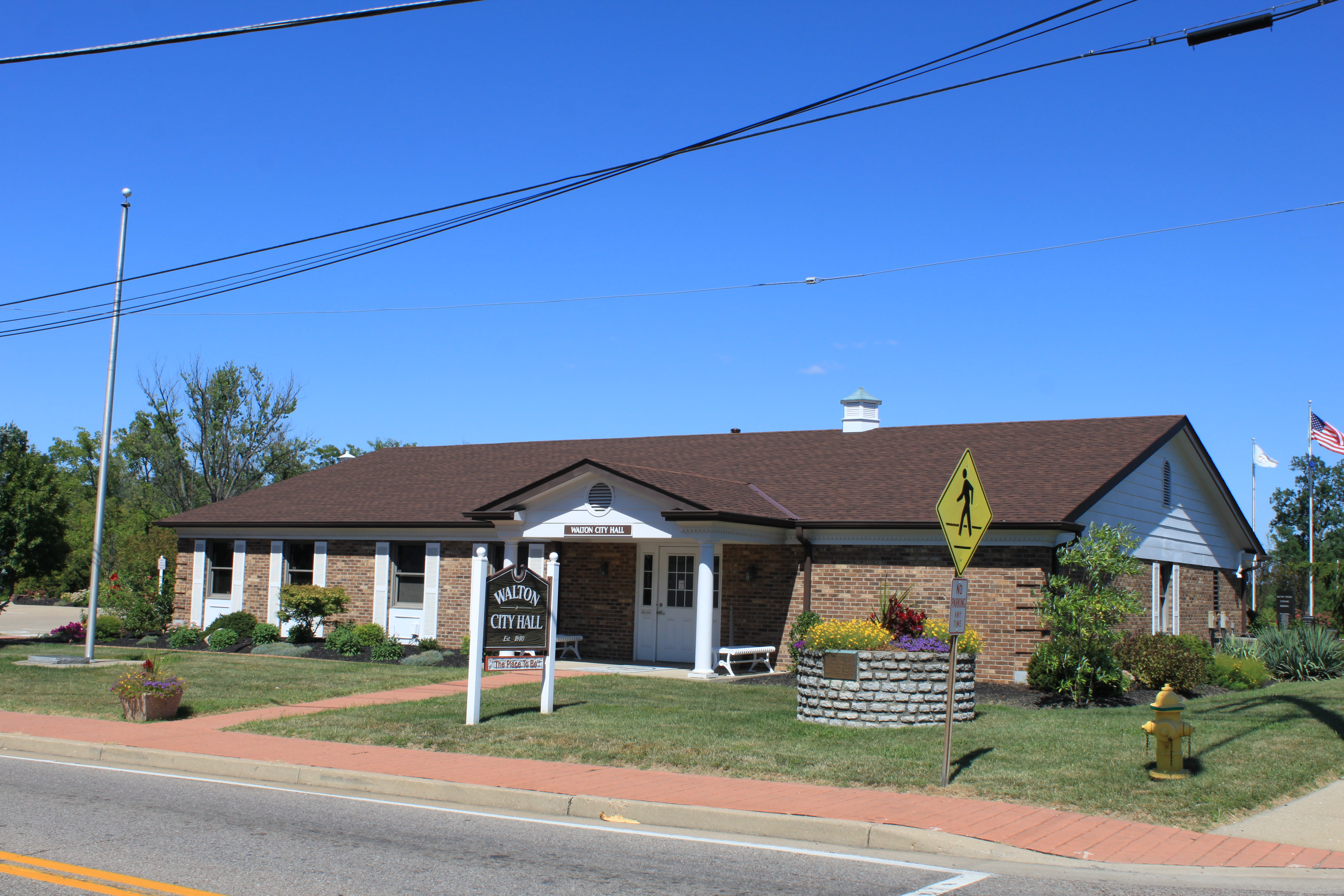
- Walton City Hall
- Motto: "The Place To Be"
- Location of Walton in Boone County, Kentucky.
- Coordinates: 38°51′52″N 84°36′44″W
- Country: United States
- State: Kentucky
- Counties: Boone, Kenton

Government
  - Mayor: Terri Courtney

Area
  - Total: 4.76 sq mi (12.33 km^{2})
  - Land: 4.74 sq mi (12.28 km^{2})
  - Water: 0.023 sq mi (0.06 km^{2})
- Elevation: 902 ft (275 m)

Population (2020)
  - Total: 5,460
  - Estimate (2024): 5,803
  - Density: 1,151.8/sq mi (444.71/km^{2})
- Time zone: UTC-5 (Eastern (EST))
  - Summer (DST): UTC-4 (EDT)
- ZIP code: 41094
- Area code: 859
- FIPS code: 21-80490
- GNIS feature ID: 2405669
- Website: www.cityofwalton.org

Walton is a home rule-class city in Boone and Kenton counties in the U.S. state of Kentucky. The population was 5,460 at the 2020 census.

== History ==
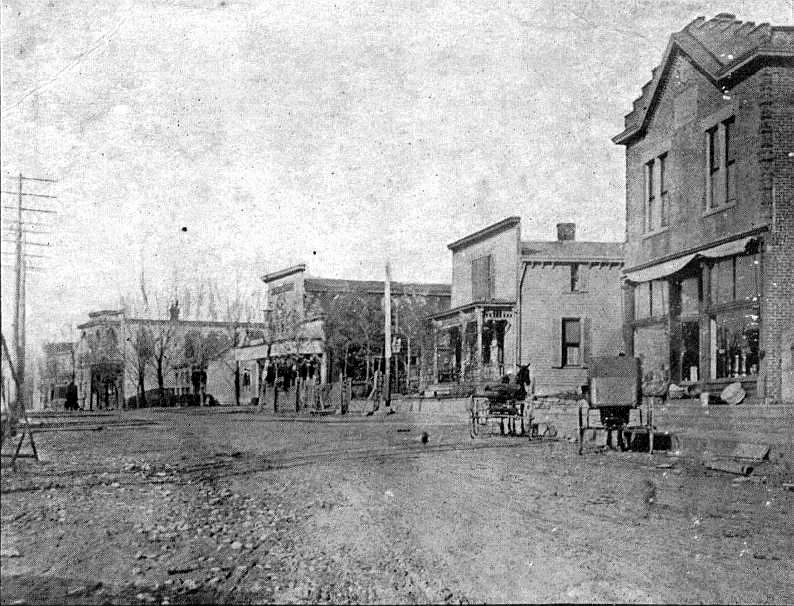
Main Street, circa 1908

Walton was established in 1840. The railroad was extended to Walton in 1869, prompting growth.

== Geography ==
Walton is located in southeastern Boone County and extends slightly into southwestern Kenton County. U.S. Route 25 (Main Street) runs through the center of the city, and Interstates 75 and 71 diverge just west of the city limits. Access to the city from I-75 is via exit 171 (Kentucky Routes 14 and 16). Downtown Cincinnati is 21 miles (34 km) to the north, Lexington is 64 miles (103 km) south via I-75, and Louisville is 82 miles (132 km) to the southwest via I-71. Walton is the highest point between Cincinnati and Louisville.

According to the United States Census Bureau, Walton has a total area of 4.3 square miles (11.1 km^{2}), of which 0.019 square miles (0.05 km^{2}), or 0.41%, is water.

== Demographics ==
Historical population
Census	Pop.	Note	%±
1880	289		—
1890	484		67.5%
1900	538		11.2%
1910	650		20.8%
1920	642		−1.2%
1930	854		33.0%
1940	973		13.9%
1950	1,358		39.6%
1960	1,530		12.7%
1970	1,801		17.7%
1980	1,651		−8.3%
1990	2,034		23.2%
2000	2,450		20.5%
2010	3,635		48.4%
2020	5,460		50.2%
2024 (est.)	5,803		6.3%
U.S. Decennial Census

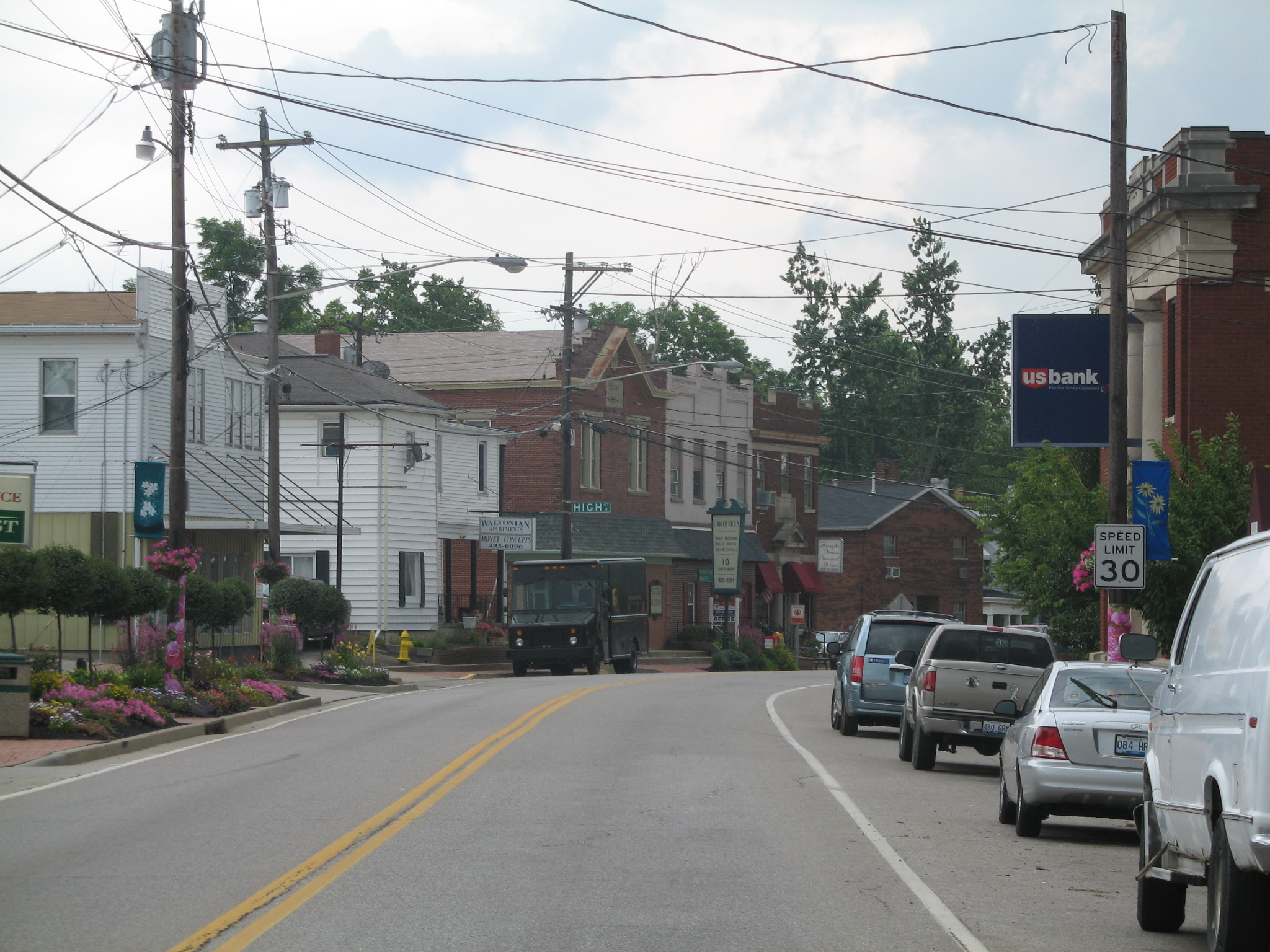
Downtown Walton

=== 2020 census ===
As of the 2020 census, Walton had a population of 5,460. The median age was 30.8 years. 33.3% of residents were under the age of 18 and 8.1% of residents were 65 years of age or older. For every 100 females there were 94.2 males, and for every 100 females age 18 and over there were 92.1 males age 18 and over.

98.7% of residents lived in urban areas, while 1.3% lived in rural areas.

There were 1,885 households in Walton, of which 49.0% had children under the age of 18 living in them. Of all households, 50.1% were married-couple households, 16.0% were households with a male householder and no spouse or partner present, and 23.7% were households with a female householder and no spouse or partner present. About 20.5% of all households were made up of individuals and 6.9% had someone living alone who was 65 years of age or older.

There were 1,977 housing units, of which 4.7% were vacant. The homeowner vacancy rate was 1.7% and the rental vacancy rate was 5.4%.

Racial composition as of the 2020 census
Race	Number	Percent
White	4,915	90.0%
Black or African American	64	1.2%
American Indian and Alaska Native	10	0.2%
Asian	66	1.2%
Native Hawaiian and Other Pacific Islander	7	0.1%
Some other race	66	1.2%
Two or more races	332	6.1%
Hispanic or Latino (of any race)	181	3.3%

=== 2000 census ===
As of the census of 2000, there were 2,450 people, 913 households, and 665 families residing in the city. The population density was 701.4 inhabitants per square mile (270.8/km^{2}). There were 992 housing units at an average density of 284.0 units per square mile (109.7 units/km^{2}). The racial makeup of the city was 97.35% White, 0.94% African American, 0.20% Native American, 0.69% Asian, 0.04% from other races, and 0.78% from two or more races. Hispanics or Latinos of any race were 0.73% of the population.

There were 913 households, out of which 41.3% had children under the age of 18 living with them, 54.3% were married couples living together, 14.6% had a female householder with no husband present, and 27.1% were non-families. 23.9% of all households were made up of individuals, and 9.1% had someone living alone who was 65 years of age or older. The average household size was 2.67 and the average family size was 3.15.

The age distribution was 29.7% under the age of 18, 8.9% from 18 to 24, 32.6% from 25 to 44, 17.5% from 45 to 64, and 11.3% who were 65 years of age or older. The median age was 33 years. For every 100 females, there were 90.4 males. For every 100 females age 18 and over, there were 84.9 males.

The median income for a household in the city was $42,462, and the median income for a family was $45,924. Males had a median income of $36,341 versus $24,858 for females. The per capita income for the city was $17,296. About 4.7% of families and 7.7% of the population were below the poverty line, including 9.1% of those under age 18 and 7.2% of those age 65 or over.

== Education ==
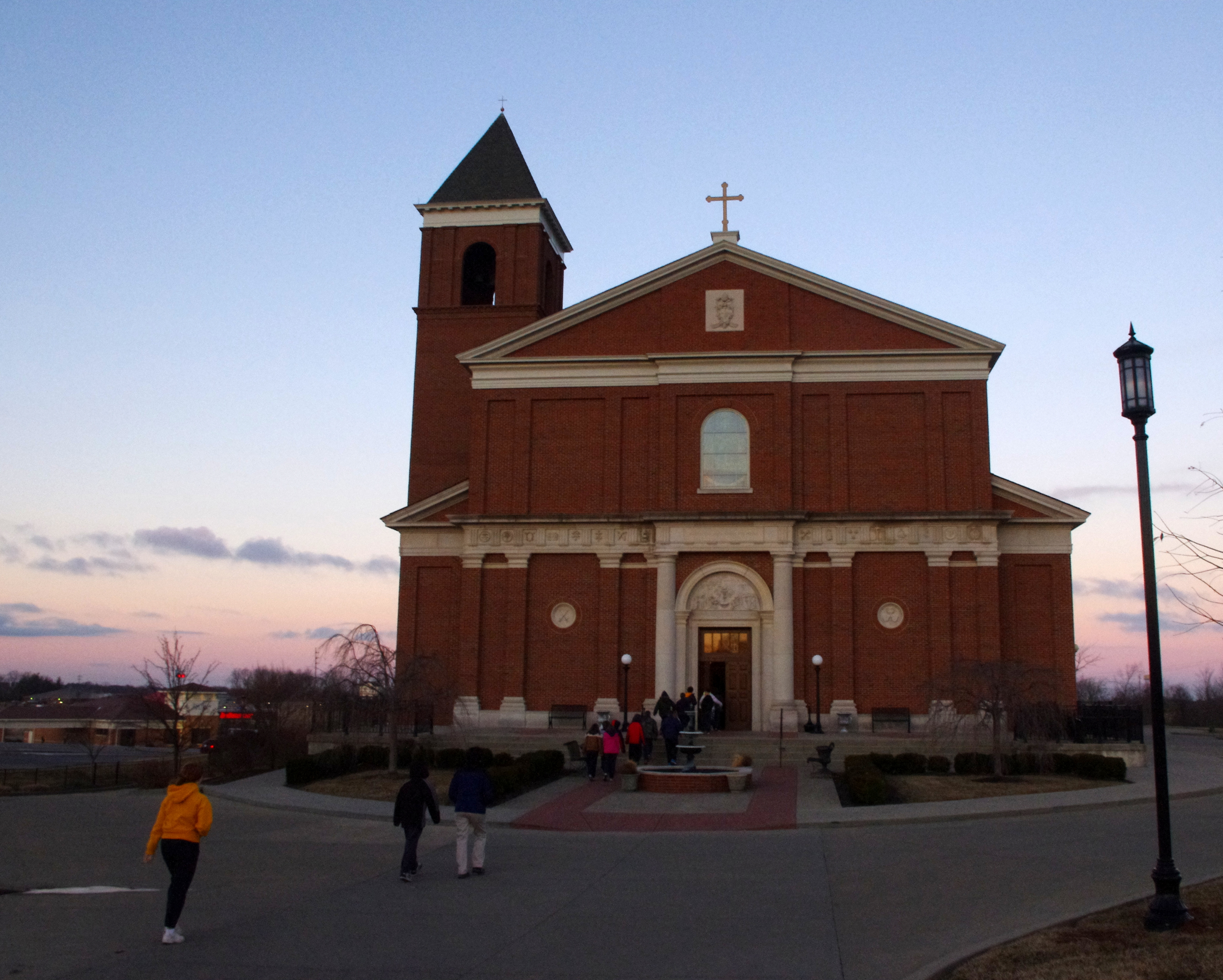
All Saints Church, designed by Duncan Stroik

The majority of the city of Walton (the portion in Boone County) is part of the Walton-Verona Independent Schools. There is an elementary school in the neighboring community of Verona, and a high school and middle school within the city of Walton. The elementary school houses about 500 students, and serves preschool through fourth grade. The middle school serves grades five through eight and the high school teaches grades nine through twelve.

The portion of Walton in Kenton County is a part of the Kenton County School District.

One parochial elementary school exists in the city, St. Joseph Academy, with parochial high schools nearby.

Six universities and ten colleges are within 50 miles (80 km) of Walton, such as the Northern Kentucky University, Thomas More College, Indiana Wesleyan University, and Gateway Community and Technical College.

Walton has a public library, a branch of the Boone County Public Library.
