= Independence, Kentucky =

- City
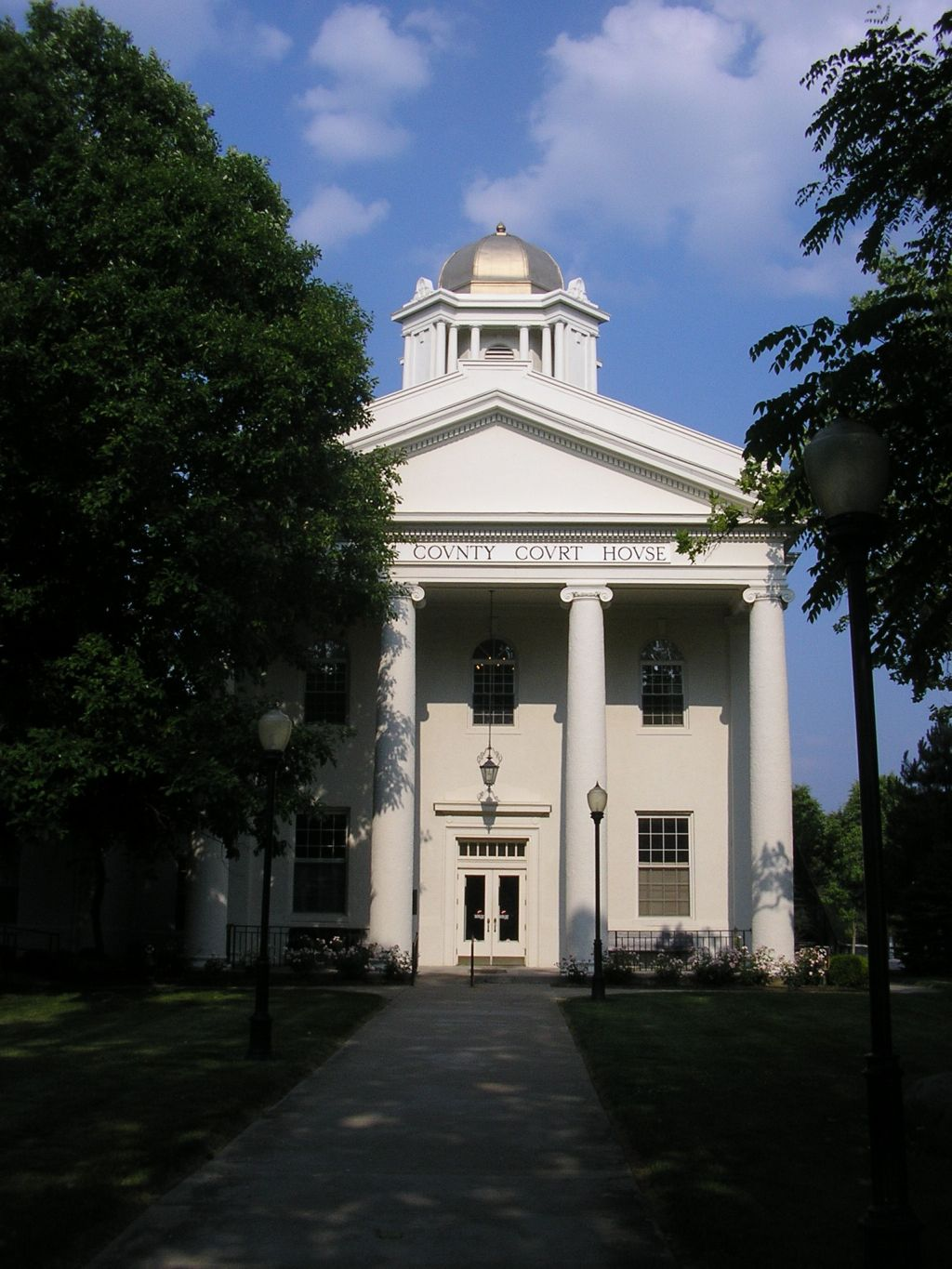
- Kenton County Courthouse

- Flag Logo
- Interactive map of Independence, Kentucky
- Location within Kentucky Location within the United States
- Coordinates: 38°57′04″N 84°32′59″W
- Country: United States
- State: Kentucky
- County: Kenton
- Named for: Establishment of Kenton County

Government
  - Mayor: Chris Reinersman

Area
  - Total: 17.80 sq mi (46.11 km^{2})
  - Land: 17.56 sq mi (45.49 km^{2})
  - Water: 0.24 sq mi (0.62 km^{2})
- Elevation: 774 ft (236 m)

Population (2020)
  - Total: 28,676
  - Estimate (2022): 29,326
  - Density: 1,632.6/sq mi (630.36/km^{2})
- Time zone: UTC−5 (Eastern (EST))
  - Summer (DST): UTC−4 (EDT)
- ZIP code: 41051
- Area code: 859
- FIPS code: 21-39142
- GNIS feature ID: 2404755
- Website: www.cityofindependence.org

Independence is a city in Kenton County, Kentucky, United States. It is one of its county's two seats of government. The population was 28,676 at the time of the 2020 census. It is the third largest city in Northern Kentucky after Covington and Florence, and is part of the Cincinnati metropolitan area. Independence is a home-rule class city under Kentucky law.

== History ==
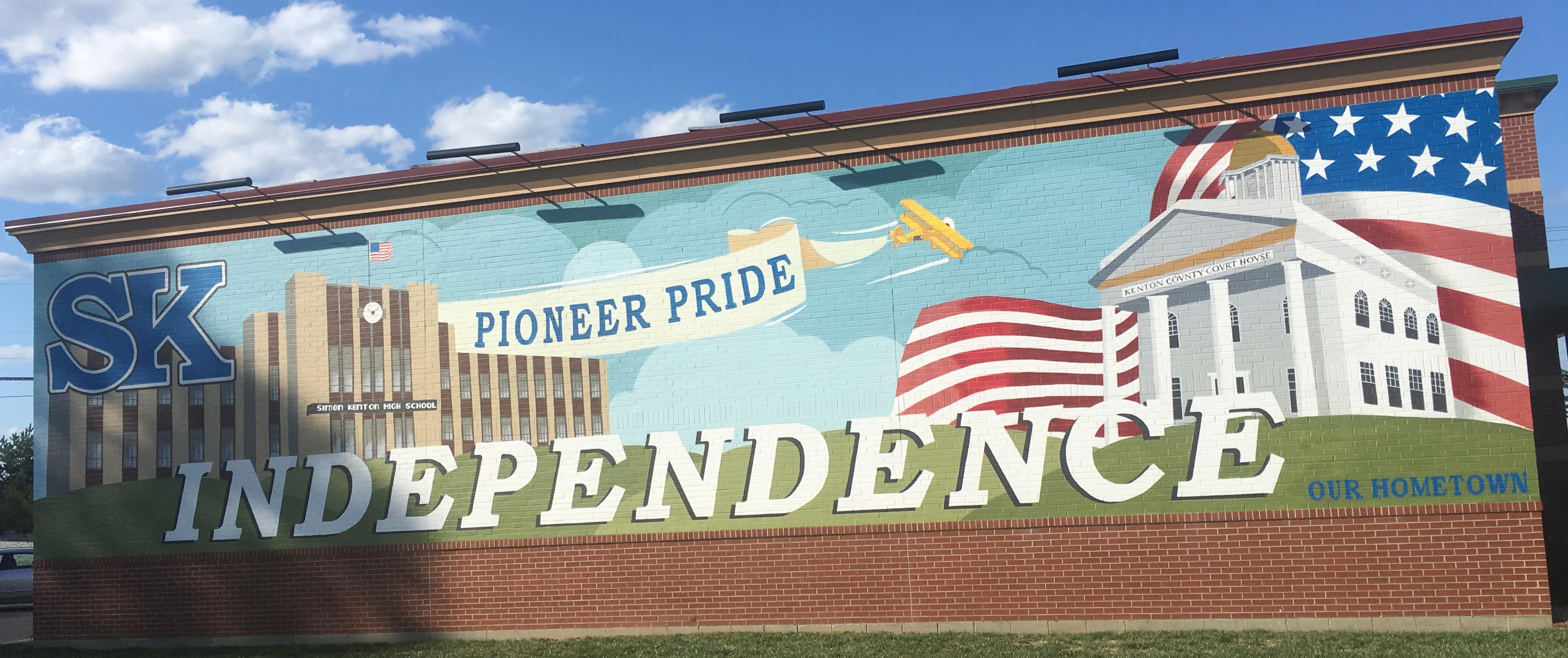
Mural depicting the Kenton County Courthouse and Simon Kenton High School.

The area post office was established by Isaac Everett in 1837 as "Everett's Creek"; in 1838, this was changed to "Crews Creek" (presumably after the present Cruises Creek that is south of the city); in 1839, Thomas Hordern renamed it "Bagby".

In 1840, Kenton was formed from Campbell and Boone counties. Local farmer John McCollum donated a site at the center of the new county to be its seat of governance, and the name "Independence" was chosen to honor the liberation of locals from Campbell County. The post office was renamed the same year. Quickly settled, Independence was formally incorporated by the state assembly in 1842.

Because the majority of the county's population resided along the Ohio River, Independence was eventually obliged to share its status as county seat with the larger city of Covington, a situation later repeated in Campbell County between the centrally located Alexandria and the larger, riverside Newport.

== Geography ==
Independence is located in central Kenton County. It is bordered to the northwest by Elsmere, to the north by Erlanger and Covington, and to the northeast by Ryland Heights. The western border of Independence follows the Boone County line, and the city of Florence in Boone County borders the far northwestern end of Independence.

The original center of Independence is in the southeast part of the city, along Madison Pike. Kentucky Route 17, a four-lane divided highway, passes just east of the city center, leading north 11 miles (18 km) to downtown Covington and south 27 miles (43 km) to Falmouth.

According to the United States Census Bureau, Independence has a total area of 17.70 square miles (45.83 km^{2}), of which 17.44 square miles (45.16 km^{2}) are land and 0.26 square miles (0.67 km^{2}), or 1.45%, are water. Banklick Creek, a northeast-flowing tributary of the Licking River, is the largest stream in the city, draining most of the area within the city limits.

== Demographics ==
Historical population
Census	Pop.	Note	%±
1850	182		—
1860	189		3.8%
1870	134		−29.1%
1880	165		23.1%
1900	193		—
1910	153		−20.7%
1920	153		0.0%
1930	260		69.9%
1940	253		−2.7%
1950	285		12.6%
1960	309		8.4%
1970	1,715		455.0%
1980	7,998		366.4%
1990	10,444		30.6%
2000	14,982		43.5%
2010	24,757		65.2%
2020	28,676		15.8%
2025 (est.)	30,198		5.3%
U.S. Decennial Census

=== 2020 census ===
As of the 2020 census, Independence had a population of 28,676. The median age was 34.7 years. 28.7% of residents were under the age of 18 and 10.5% of residents were 65 years of age or older. For every 100 females there were 99.7 males, and for every 100 females age 18 and over there were 96.5 males age 18 and over.

98.1% of residents lived in urban areas, while 1.9% lived in rural areas.

There were 9,890 households in Independence, of which 43.0% had children under the age of 18 living in them. Of all households, 59.0% were married-couple households, 13.1% were households with a male householder and no spouse or partner present, and 19.8% were households with a female householder and no spouse or partner present. About 16.5% of all households were made up of individuals and 5.8% had someone living alone who was 65 years of age or older.

There were 10,161 housing units, of which 2.7% were vacant. The homeowner vacancy rate was 0.7% and the rental vacancy rate was 4.4%.

Racial composition as of the 2020 census
Race	Number	Percent
White	25,669	89.5%
Black or African American	633	2.2%
American Indian and Alaska Native	38	0.1%
Asian	274	1.0%
Native Hawaiian and Other Pacific Islander	19	0.1%
Some other race	345	1.2%
Two or more races	1,698	5.9%
Hispanic or Latino (of any race)	928	3.2%

=== 2000 census ===
As of the census of 2000, there were 14,982 people, 5,181 households, and 4,149 families residing in the city. The population density was 893.2 inhabitants per square mile (344.9/km^{2}). There were 5,391 housing units at an average density of 321.4 per square mile (124.1/km^{2}). The racial makeup of the city was 97.20% White, 0.96% African American, 0.18% Native American, 0.40% Asian, 0.02% Pacific Islander, 0.36% from other races, and 0.87% from two or more races. Hispanic or Latino of any race were 1.15% of the population.

There were 5,181 households, out of which 44.9% had children under the age of 18 living with them, 62.9% were married couples living together, 12.1% had a female householder with no husband present, and 19.9% were non-families. 15.0% of all households were made up of individuals, and 3.4% had someone living alone who was 65 years of age or older. The average household size was 2.89 and the average family size was 3.21.

In the city, the population was spread out, with 30.4% under the age of 18, 9.2% from 18 to 24, 35.3% from 25 to 44, 18.5% from 45 to 64, and 6.5% who were 65 years of age or older. The median age was 31 years. For every 100 females, there were 101.6 males. For every 100 females age 18 and over, there were 97.3 males.

The median income for a household in the city was $51,002, and the median income for a family was $55,030. Males had a median income of $39,213 versus $26,807 for females. The per capita income for the city was $20,191. About 5.4% of families and 6.5% of the population were below the poverty line, including 9.2% of those under age 18 and 4.2% of those age 65 or over.

== Economy ==
Major employers in Independence include Balluff, Cengage Learning, Krauss Maffei, Mazak, and Rotek.

== Culture ==
Independence is served by a branch of the Kenton County Public Library.

== Parks and recreation ==
- Independence Park
- Lincoln Ridge Park
- Bowman Field
- Doe Run Lake
- Memorial Park
- Mills Road Park
- Pioneer Park
- Richardson Road Park
- Sterling Staggs Park

== Education ==
- Beechgrove Elementary School
- Community Christian Academy
- Kenton Elementary
- Simon Kenton High School
- St. Cecilia Catholic School
- Summit View Academy
- Twenhofel Middle School
- Whites Tower Elementary

* Some members of the community are districted for Woodland Middle School and Scott High School as well.

== Infrastructure ==
- Independence Fire District
