= Kenton County, Kentucky =

County in the United States

- County
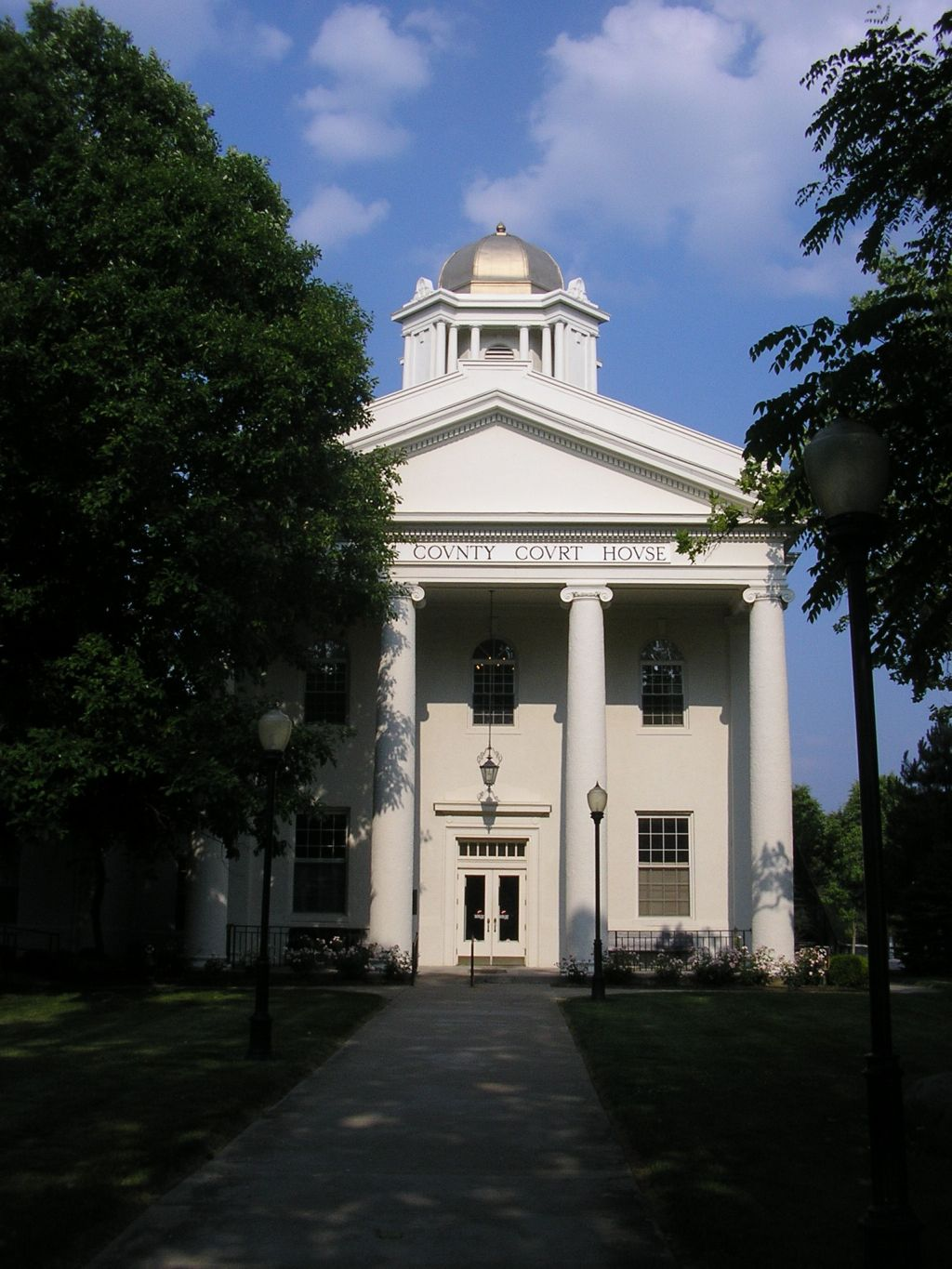
- Kenton County Courthouse in Independence

- Location within the U.S. state of Kentucky
- Coordinates: 38°56′N 84°32′W
- Country: United States
- State: Kentucky
- Founded: 1840
- Named for: Simon Kenton
- Seat: Covington and Independence
- Largest city: Covington

Government
  - Judge/Executive: Kris Knochelmann (R)

Area
  - Total: 164 sq mi (420 km^{2})
  - Land: 160 sq mi (410 km^{2})
  - Water: 4.1 sq mi (11 km^{2}) 2.5%

Population (2020)
  - Total: 169,064
  - Estimate (2025): 175,779 ▲
  - Density: 1,100/sq mi (410/km^{2})
- Time zone: UTC−5 (Eastern)
  - Summer (DST): UTC−4 (EDT)
- Congressional district: 4th
- Website: https://www.kentoncountyky.gov/

Kenton County is a county located in the northern part of the Commonwealth of Kentucky. As of the 2020 census, the population was 169,064, making it the third most populous county in Kentucky (behind Jefferson County and Fayette County). Its county seats are Covington and Independence. It was, until November 24, 2010, the only county in Kentucky to have two legally recognized county seats. The county was formed in 1840 and is named for Simon Kenton, a frontiersman notable in the early history of the state.

Kenton County, with Boone and Campbell counties, is part of the Northern Kentucky metro area, and is included in the Cincinnati-Middletown, OH-KY-IN Metropolitan Statistical Area.

== History ==
Kenton County was established on January 29, 1840, from land given by Campbell County. It was named in honor of Simon Kenton, a pioneer of Kentucky.

== Geography ==
According to the United States Census Bureau, the county has a total area of 164 square miles (420 km^{2}), of which 160 square miles (410 km^{2}) is land and 4.1 square miles (11 km^{2}) (2.5%) is water. The county is located at the confluence of the Licking River and Ohio River, in the outer Bluegrass area of the Bluegrass region of the state. The elevation in the county ranges from 455 to 960 feet (139 to 293 m) above sea level.

=== Adjacent counties ===
- Hamilton County, Ohio (north)
- Campbell County (east)
- Pendleton County (southeast)
- Grant County (southwest)
- Boone County (west)

=== Major highways ===
- I-71
- I-75
- I-275
- US 25
- US 42
- US 127
- KY 8
- KY 14
- KY 16
- KY 17
- KY 177
- KY 236
- KY 371
- KY 536
- KY 1072
- KY 1303
- KY 1486
- KY 1829
- KY 2042
- KY 2043
- KY 2046

== Demographics ==
Historical population
Census	Pop.	Note	%±
1850	17,038		—
1860	25,467		49.5%
1870	36,096		41.7%
1880	43,983		21.9%
1890	54,161		23.1%
1900	63,591		17.4%
1910	70,355		10.6%
1920	73,453		4.4%
1930	93,534		27.3%
1940	93,139		−0.4%
1950	104,254		11.9%
1960	120,700		15.8%
1970	129,440		7.2%
1980	137,058		5.9%
1990	142,031		3.6%
2000	151,464		6.6%
2010	159,720		5.5%
2020	169,064		5.9%
2025 (est.)	175,779	▲	4.0%
U.S. Decennial Census; 1790-1960 1900-1990; 1990-2000 2010-2020

=== 2020 census ===
As of the 2020 census, the county had a population of 169,064. The median age was 37.5 years. 23.7% of residents were under the age of 18 and 15.2% of residents were 65 years of age or older. For every 100 females there were 97.4 males, and for every 100 females age 18 and over there were 95.3 males age 18 and over.

The racial makeup of the county was 85.2% White, 4.8% Black or African American, 0.3% American Indian and Alaska Native, 1.2% Asian, 0.1% Native Hawaiian and Pacific Islander, 2.2% from some other race, and 6.2% from two or more races. Hispanic or Latino residents of any race comprised 4.6% of the population.

93.3% of residents lived in urban areas, while 6.7% lived in rural areas.

There were 67,612 households in the county, of which 30.6% had children under the age of 18 living with them and 27.1% had a female householder with no spouse or partner present. About 29.5% of all households were made up of individuals and 10.4% had someone living alone who was 65 years of age or older.

There were 72,585 housing units, of which 6.9% were vacant. Among occupied housing units, 66.2% were owner-occupied and 33.8% were renter-occupied. The homeowner vacancy rate was 1.3% and the rental vacancy rate was 7.2%.

=== 2000 census ===
As of the census of 2000, there were 151,464 people, 59,444 households, and 39,470 families living in the county. The population density was 935 per square mile (361/km^{2}). There were 63,571 housing units at an average density of 392 per square mile (151/km^{2}). The racial makeup of the county was 93.99% White, 3.84% Black or African American, 0.15% Native American, 0.59% Asian, 0.03% Pacific Islander, 0.41% from other races, and 1.00% from two or more races. 1.10% of the population were Hispanics or Latinos of any race.

There were 59,444 households, out of which 33.40% had children under the age of 18 living with them, 50.10% were married couples living together, 12.10% had a female householder with no husband present, and 33.60% were non-families. 27.80% of all households were made up of individuals, and 9.00% had someone living alone who was 65 years of age or older. The average household size was 2.52 and the average family size was 3.11.

The age distribution was 26.30% under 18, 9.20% from 18 to 24, 31.90% from 25 to 44, 21.40% from 45 to 64, and 11.10% who were 65 or older. The median age was 34 years. For every 100 females there were 96.20 males. For every 100 females age 18 and over, there were 91.90 males.

The median income for a household in the county was $43,906, and the median income for a family was $52,953. Males had a median income of $37,845 versus $27,253 for females. The per capita income for the county was $22,085. About 7.10% of families and 9.00% of the population were below the poverty line, including 12.00% of those under age 18 and 7.70% of those age 65 or over.

== Economy ==
In October 2026, Niagara Bottling announced the opening of their $141 million beverage production and distribution facility, bringing 60 full-time jobs to Kenton County. The company's new Elsmere operation sits on 52 acres at the C5 Airport East Logistics Center and includes more than 436,000 square feet of manufacturing space.

== Education ==
=== Public schools ===
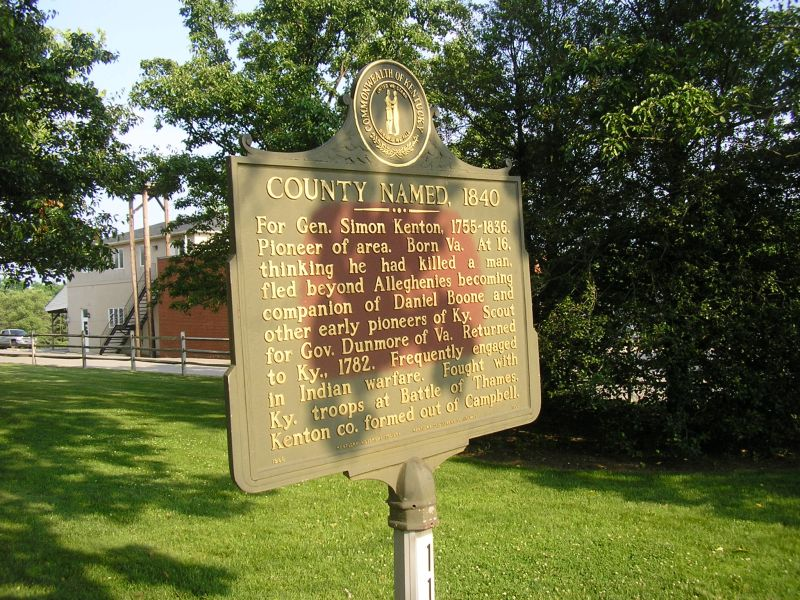
Historical marker for the county in Independence

Kenton County has five school districts providing education, from the extremely rural southern areas to the highly urbanized north. The districts are:

- Kenton County School District
- Covington Independent Public Schools
- Beechwood Independent School District (serves Fort Mitchell)
- Ludlow Independent Schools
- Erlanger-Elsmere Schools

=== Private schools ===
The Catholic educational system is as extensive as the public system. These schools are operated by the Diocese of Covington's Department of Schools. The Diocese runs 17 schools in Kenton County.

=== Higher education ===
Thomas More University is the only institute of higher learning wholly in the county itself. Northern Kentucky University had a Covington campus located at 1401 Dixie Highway until it closed at the end of 2008. NKU's main campus is not far from Kenton County – only about 4 miles from the Licking River. The Kentucky Community and Technical College System also operates the Gateway Community and Technical College. Classes are provided at GCTC locations in Boone County, Covington, Park Hills and Edgewood.

=== Libraries ===
Kenton County is served by a county library with branches in Covington, Erlanger, Independence, and Latonia. The Erlanger Branch has grown to be the busiest branch library in the state of Kentucky.

In 2008, Kenton County Public Library received the highest score of any Kentucky library ranked by Hennen's American Public Library Ratings.

== Communities ==
=== Cities ===
- Bromley
- Covington (county seat)
- Crescent Springs
- Crestview Hills
- Crittenden
- Edgewood
- Elsmere
- Erlanger
- Fairview
- Fort Mitchell
- Fort Wright
- Independence (county seat)
- Kenton Vale
- Lakeside Park
- Ludlow
- Park Hills
- Ryland Heights
- Taylor Mill
- Villa Hills
- Walton

=== Unincorporated communities ===
- Atwood
- Latonia Lakes
- Nicholson
- Visalia

Visalia and Latonia Lakes have been dissolved as cities within Kenton County.

== Politics ==
United States presidential election results for Kenton County, Kentucky
Year	Republican		Democratic		Third party(ies)	
Year	No.	%	No.	%	No.	%
1880	2,980	40.43%	4,370	59.29%	20	0.27%
1884	3,459	42.92%	4,489	55.70%	111	1.38%
1888	3,994	39.98%	5,879	58.84%	118	1.18%
1892	3,494	36.61%	5,686	59.57%	365	3.82%
1896	6,165	46.28%	7,008	52.60%	149	1.12%
1900	5,650	42.58%	7,263	54.74%	355	2.68%
1904	6,306	48.14%	5,760	43.98%	1,032	7.88%
1908	6,431	40.76%	8,683	55.04%	663	4.20%
1912	2,512	18.26%	7,761	56.42%	3,482	25.31%
1916	5,267	32.55%	10,402	64.28%	514	3.18%
1920	11,411	39.72%	16,300	56.74%	1,019	3.55%
1924	13,537	44.33%	7,948	26.03%	9,054	29.65%
1928	21,043	53.56%	18,165	46.24%	77	0.20%
1932	11,202	32.69%	22,311	65.12%	750	2.19%
1936	8,885	25.63%	21,879	63.11%	3,903	11.26%
1940	13,147	40.47%	19,261	59.30%	74	0.23%
1944	12,654	41.85%	17,524	57.96%	58	0.19%
1948	10,771	35.07%	18,918	61.60%	1,022	3.33%
1952	19,200	49.60%	19,457	50.26%	52	0.13%
1956	20,895	57.93%	14,923	41.37%	252	0.70%
1960	21,857	52.89%	19,466	47.11%	0	0.00%
1964	15,630	40.29%	23,103	59.55%	62	0.16%
1968	17,263	43.64%	14,656	37.05%	7,638	19.31%
1972	28,076	66.66%	12,872	30.56%	1,173	2.78%
1976	22,087	52.99%	18,833	45.18%	760	1.82%
1980	25,965	56.16%	17,907	38.73%	2,360	5.10%
1984	34,304	69.66%	14,642	29.73%	299	0.61%
1988	30,738	67.12%	14,838	32.40%	217	0.47%
1992	27,261	51.31%	16,344	30.76%	9,530	17.94%
1996	28,579	54.77%	19,407	37.19%	4,194	8.04%
2000	35,363	62.87%	19,100	33.96%	1,786	3.18%
2004	43,664	65.05%	22,834	34.02%	625	0.93%
2008	40,714	59.69%	26,480	38.82%	1,019	1.49%
2012	41,389	61.13%	24,920	36.81%	1,395	2.06%
2016	42,958	59.67%	24,214	33.63%	4,826	6.70%
2020	48,129	58.55%	32,271	39.26%	1,798	2.19%
2024	48,444	59.63%	30,859	37.98%	1,938	2.39%

The county is governed by a Judge/Executive and a Fiscal Court, which together oversee the county's operations and policies. The Judge/Executive serves as the chief executive and administrative officer, responsible for implementing policies, managing county services, and overseeing the budget. The Fiscal Court, composed of three county commissioners, functions as the legislative body, working alongside the Judge/Executive to pass ordinances, approve budgets, and make key decisions affecting the county. This structure ensures a balance of executive and legislative authority, guiding Kenton County's development and public services.

The current Judge/Executive is Kris Knochelmann, while the three county commissioners are Beth Sewell (District 1), Jon Draud (District 2) and Joe Nienaber Jr. (District 3).

The county voted "No" on 2022 Kentucky Amendment 2, an anti-abortion ballot measure, by 55% to 45%, and backed Donald Trump with 59% of the vote to Joe Biden's 39% in the 2020 presidential election.

=== Elected officials ===
Elected officials as of January 3, 2025
U.S. House	Thomas Massie (R)	KY 4
Ky. Senate	Matt Nunn (R)	17
Ky. Senate	Gex Williams (R)	20
Ky. Senate	Christian McDaniel (R)	23
Ky. Senate	Shelley Funke Frommeyer (R)	24
Ky. House	Savannah Maddox (R)	61
Ky. House	Kim Banta (R)	63
Ky. House	Kimberly Poore Moser (R)	64
Ky. House	Stephanie Dietz (R)	65
Ky. House	Steven Doan (R)	69
Ky. House	Mark Hart (R)	78

== See also ==
- National Register of Historic Places listings in Kenton County, Kentucky
