= 2012 Crittenden–Piner tornado =

EF4 tornado in Northern Kentucky, U.S.

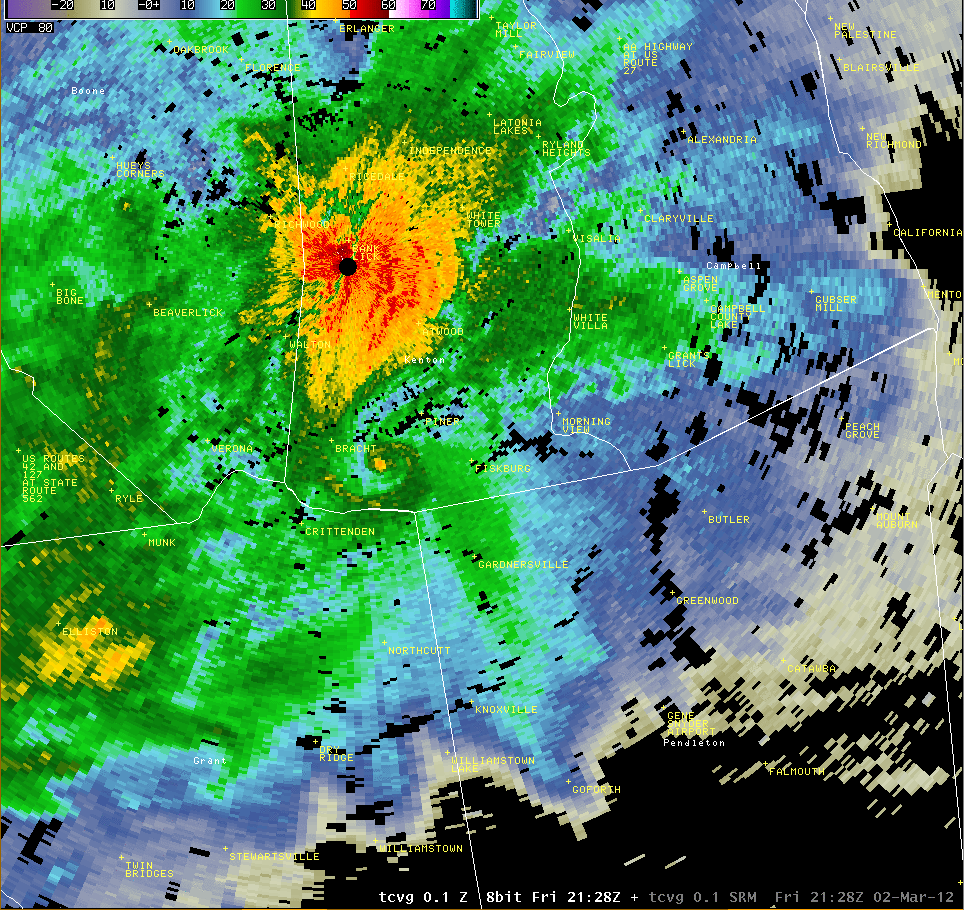
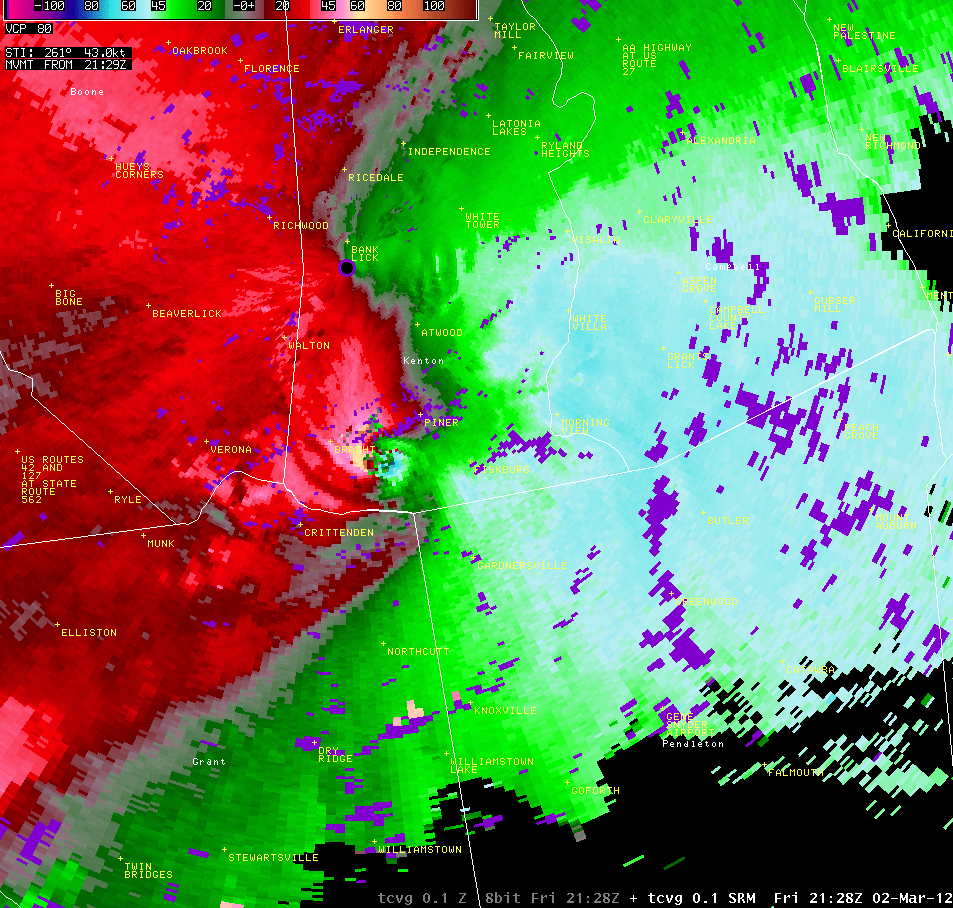
- Clockwise from top: View of the tornado as it overtook Interstate 75 north of Crittenden, shortly before reaching EF4 intensity; TDWR velocity imagery of the tornado, as seen from Cincinnati/Northern Kentucky International Airport; A damaged vehicle along Barley Circle in Crittenden; A destroyed frame home along Bagby Road in Crittenden; TDWR reflectivity imagery of the tornado

Meteorological history
- Formed: March 2, 2012; 4:23 p.m. EST (UTC–05:00)
- Dissipated: March 2, 2012; 4:32 p.m. EST (UTC–05:00)
- Duration: 9 minutes

EF4 tornado
- on the Enhanced Fujita scale
- Max width: 880 yd (0.50 mi; 800 m)
- Path length: 9.85 mi (15.85 km)
- Highest winds: 175 mph (282 km/h)

Overall effects
- Fatalities: 4
- Injuries: 8
- Damage: $20 million (2012 USD)
- Areas affected: Grant and Kenton Counties; particularly in Crittenden, Piner, Fiskburg, and Morning View, Kentucky, United States.
- Part of the Tornado outbreak of March 2–3, 2012 and Tornadoes of 2012

On March 2, 2012, a violent, short-lived, and deadly tornado impacted the southern Cincinnati metropolitan area, causing devastating damage across the communities of Crittenden, Piner, Fiskburg, and Morning View, in northern Kentucky. This tornado was one of two tornadoes rated EF4 on the Enhanced Fujita scale during a large two-day tornado outbreak across the central and eastern United States, particularly in the Ohio Valley region, from March 2–3; it was also responsible for four of the 41 direct fatalities from the outbreak. The Crittenden–Piner tornado, as it is referred to in both official reports and news sources, was part of a cyclic supercell, or tornado family, that had previously dropped a fatal and long-tracked EF4 tornado in southern Indiana, impacting the community of Henryville.

The worst damage caused by the tornado was a streak of EF4 damage just to the east of Interstate 75, encompassing KY 25 and Bagby Road. Numerous homes in this damage corridor were destroyed with winds estimated at 175 miles per hour (282 km/h), tying this tornado with the prior EF4 Henryville tornado for the highest-rated tornado of the outbreak.

The violent tornado tracked 9.85 miles (15.85 km) through Grant and Kenton Counties, destroying multiple homes at violent intensity, debarking shrubbery, tossing vehicles, and lofting debris significant distances. In addition to the four fatalities by the tornado, eight people were injured during the event.

== Meteorological synopsis ==
=== Forecasting in advance ===
In late February 2012, the possibility of significant severe weather on March 2–3 began to materialize. A day 2 MDT (moderate) risk for severe weather was issued by the Storm Prediction Center (SPC) on March 1, for regions extending from west-central Ohio to northeastern Mississippi, with a 45% hatched probability for severe weather issued within this outlook. Weather officials noted the presence of a large mid and upper-level trough that overspread the region, which contained a belt of extreme southwesterly flow. In addition to this, a deep surface low, which was forecast to rapidly shift northeastward with an accompanying warm front to the east and a cold front to the south, was also observed. With this surface low, severe thunderstorms (some rotating), mixed-layer CAPE (MLCAPE) values of 1000–2000 J kg⁻¹, continued advection of steep lapse rates into the mid-lower Mississippi Valley region, extreme shear and thermodynamic profiles, and large hail were expected.

=== Initiation of storms ===
SPC probabilistic outlooks on March 2, 2012

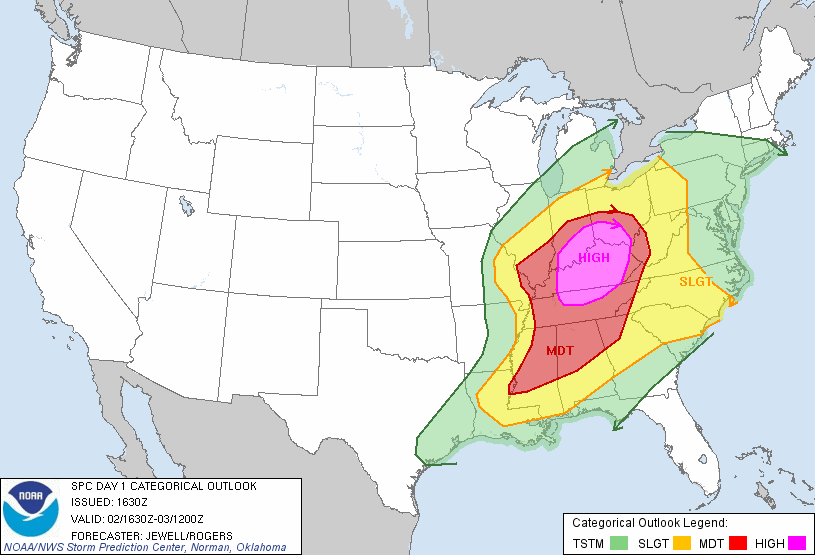
Day 1 1630z (UTC) categorical outlook

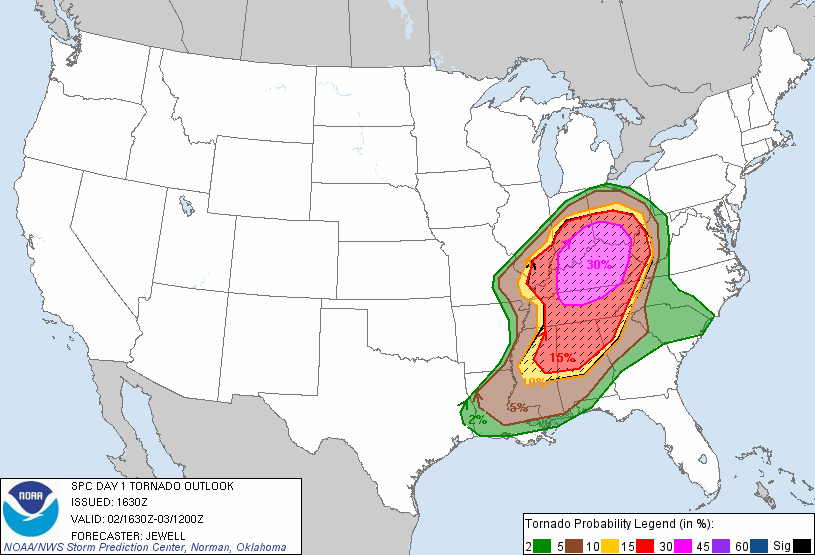
Day 1 1630z tornado outlook

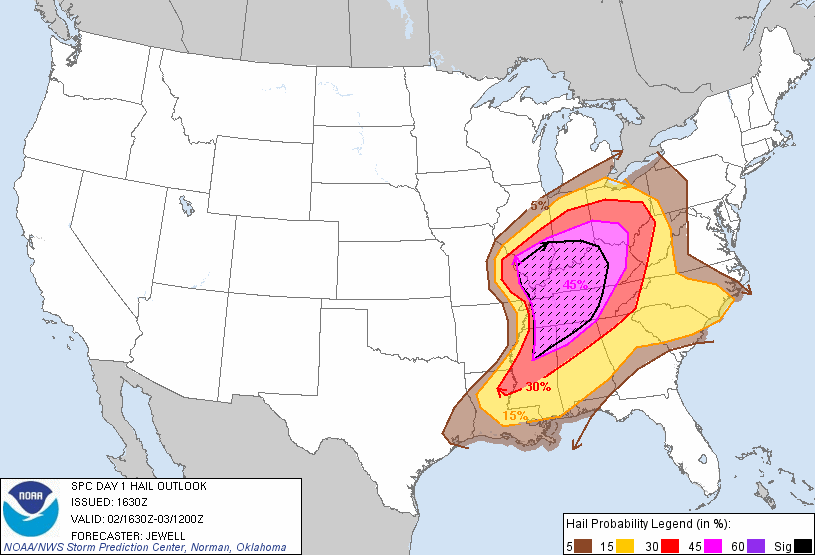
Day 1 1630z hail outlook

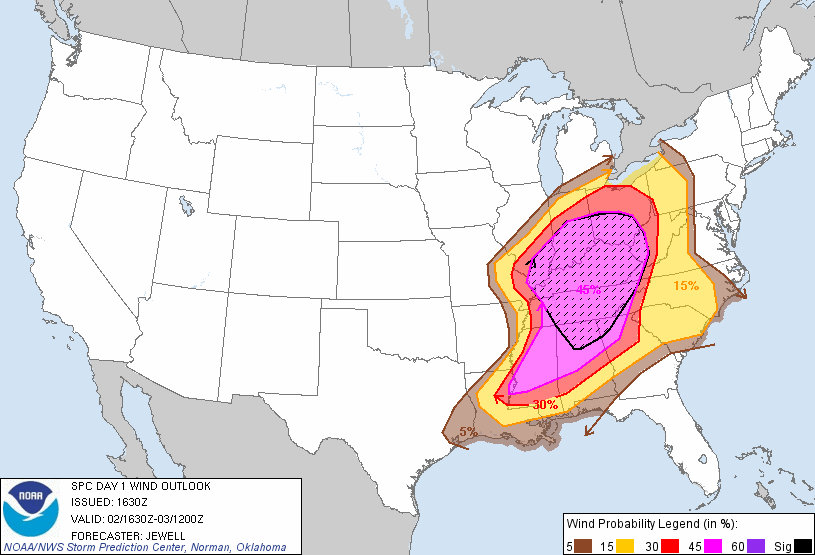
Day 1 1630z severe wind outlook

By 16:30 UTC (11:30 a.m. EST) on March 2, the forecast parameters for severe weather had remained unchanged, with a 30% hatched risk for significant (EF2+) tornadoes issued in the Ohio Valley region, encompassing the states of Ohio, Indiana, Kentucky, and Tennessee. By the time this outlook was issued, the aforementioned mid and upper-level trough, now with a well-defined vorticity center, had positioned itself over northern Missouri. This trough was expected to continue east into the Ohio River Valley in the next few hours. It was also projected to overspread an extremely large warm sector in the region, creating the potential for severe weather. Significant levels of moisture and initiation off of a trailing cold front (or prefrontal boundaries) were also expected to aid in the development of storms, with tornadoes being a major threat.

== Tornado summary ==
An anchored farmhouse that was swept away at EF4 intensity along the northern side of Old Lexington Road (Lexington Pike)

=== Formation and peak intensity in Crittenden ===
After the initial EF4 tornado that tore across southern Indiana dissipated near Bedford, Kentucky, the parent thunderstorm that had dropped this tornado quickly continued east. It then dropped another tornado, which initially touched down in Grant County, Kentucky at 4:23 p.m. EST (21:23 UTC). This tornado quickly moved east-northeast at a pace exceeding 60 miles per hour (97 km/h). On the western half of Interstate 75, rows of homes were damaged in the Harvesters Subdivision— mainly along the end of Barley Circle, where winds were estimated up to 145 miles per hour (233 km/h). In the Harvesters Subdivision, multiple apartments were also significantly damaged, displacing numerous tenants. Immediately after exiting this subdivision, the tornado entered Kenton County at 4:24 p.m. EST (21:24 UTC), where it overtook I-75 north of Crittenden. At this time, the tornado appeared as a large and rain-wrapped funnel, with two witnesses driving south on the interstate recording a video of the tornado from within their car.

After the tornado crossed I-75, it became violent as a streak of EF4 damage began along US 25, where multiple homes were swept away, with debris scattered from their foundations. Of the five homes that were completely destroyed along US 25, two were noted by damage surveyors to have been bolted and strapped to their foundations. The tornado reached its maximum intensity at this point, with estimated winds of 175 miles per hour (282 km/h) based on the destruction of two bolted frame farm residences. At least two vehicles were carried from their original places, with one being carried 1,800 feet (550 m). Trees were stripped of all vestiges and lost all branches, with some even showing near-full debarking. This swath of EF4 damage continued to Bagby Road. All four deaths from the tornado were in this EF4 corridor: two in permanent homes, one from a woman in a vehicle that was thrown off of I-75, and another from a man in a dump truck.

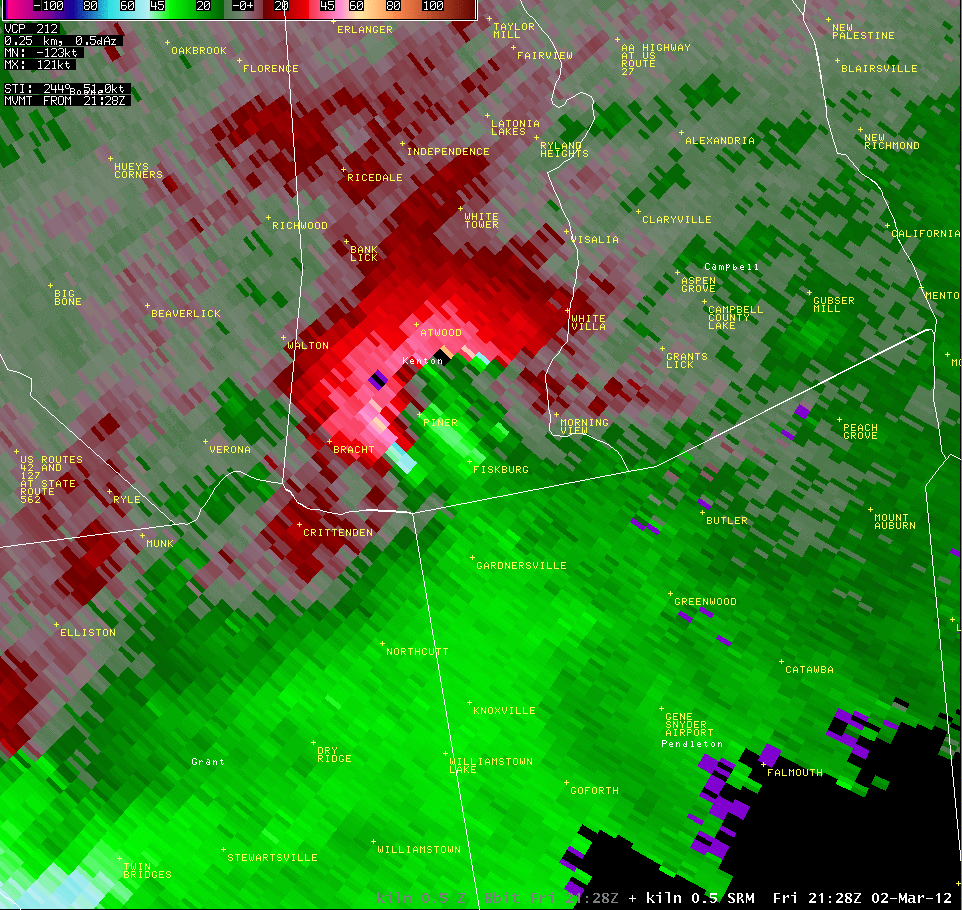
NEXRAD base velocity scan of the tornado, as it was near Piner

=== Piner and Fiskburg ===
Continuing towards Piner, the tornado caused EF3 damage to several properties. At this point in its life, the tornado had assumed a very well-defined hook echo on radar, with a bounded weak echo region (signifying a strong updraft) present on radar. A very tight and intense velocity couplet was also observed. Multiple single and double-wide mobile homes were destroyed in the Piner area, with only brick and siding structures left at these sites. Many of these homes had fully collapsed exterior walls and fully removed roof frames. At least two homes were fully removed from their foundations. Extreme contextual damage continued, as vehicles were thrown up to 0.25 mi (0.40 km) from their original locations. The tornado also impacted Fiskburg, where at least one home was destroyed before the tornado continued east.

=== Morning View and dissipation ===
Damage near Morning View was consistent with EF1 to EF2 intensity as the tornado continued east, where multiple permanent homes and mobile homes sustained moderate damage. The tornado dissipated at 4:32 p.m. EST (21:32 UTC) south of Morning View, just south of the Campbell County line. After the dissipation of the tornado, debris fallout occurred. In addition to the tornado, non-tornadic winds in the rear flank downdraft (RFD) of the supercell exceeded 100 miles per hour (160 km/h), causing damage of their own. Numerous barns and outbuildings were completely destroyed, and acres of trees were laid flat by these straight-line winds.

== Aftermath ==
=== Statistics ===
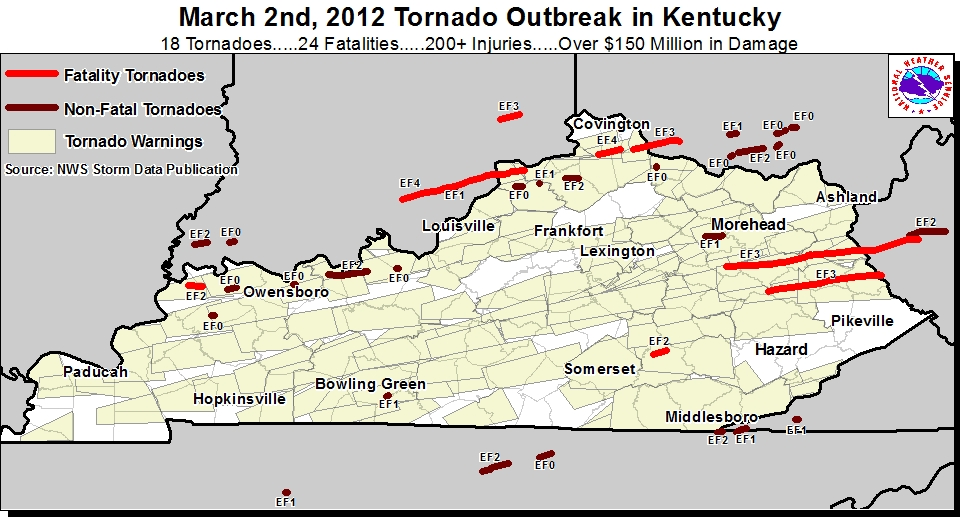
Map of Kentucky during the March 2, 2012 tornado outbreak. The EF4 Crittenden–Piner tornado is shown as the track labeled “EF4” immediately south of Covington. It was one of several deadly storms throughout the state.

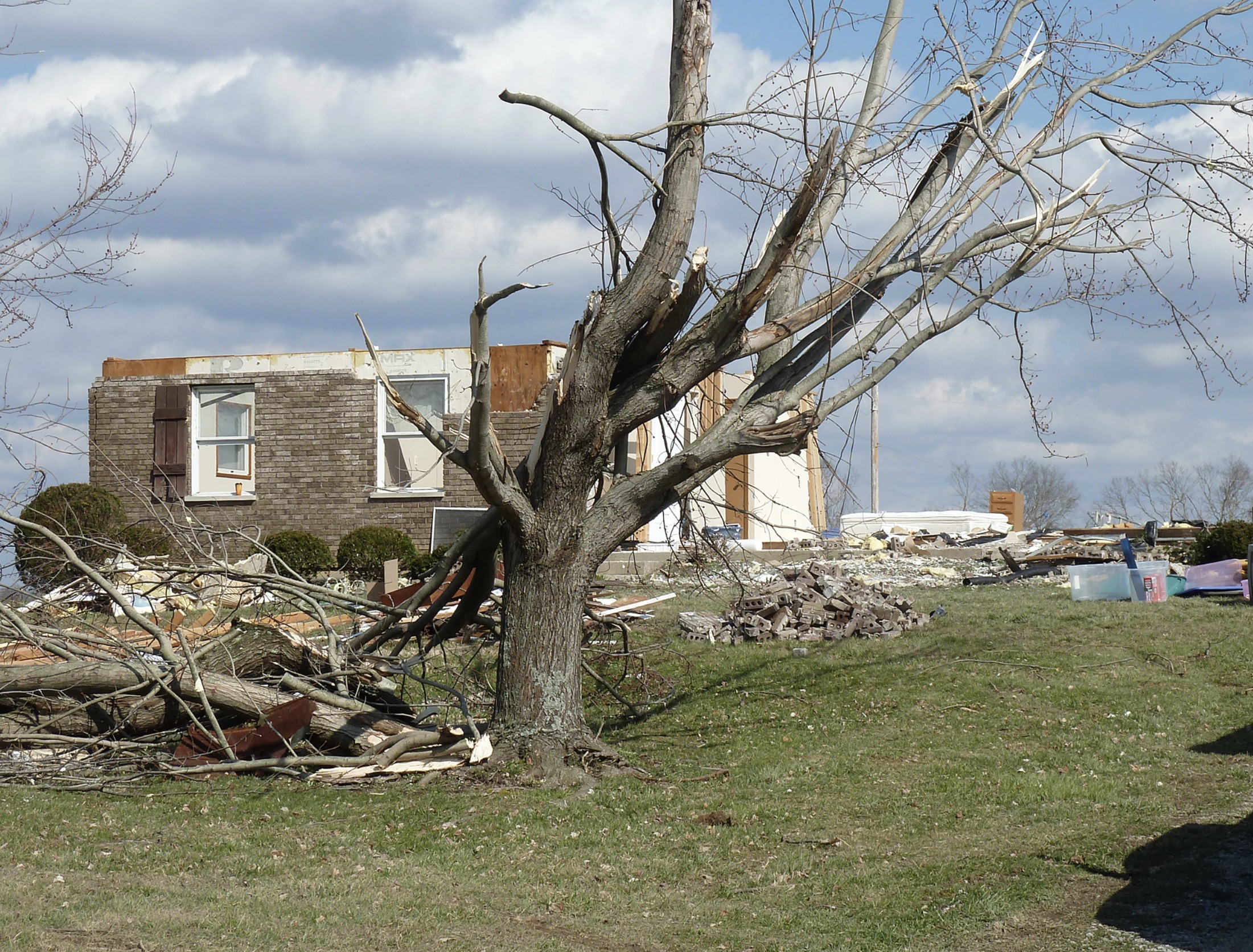
A severely damaged home along Parker Grove Road, southwest of Piner

The storm produced a damage path 9.85 miles (15.85 km) long, 1.33 miles (2.14 km) of which were in Grant County, and 8.52 miles (13.71 km) of which were Kenton County. The tornado caused significant damage to multiple residential areas. It reached its maximum intensity east of Interstate 75, where it swept away multiple bolted and strapped homes between Lexington Pike and Bagby Road, with winds estimated at 175 miles per hour (282 km/h). The maximum width of the tornado was 0.5 miles (800 m). All four deaths from the tornado took place within the tornado's corridor of EF4 damage.

The tornado would be the last EF4 in Kentucky for nine years until a deadly tornado in Western Kentucky on December 10, 2021.

The following table provides information on the four fatalities:

Name	Age	Gender	Location	Additional Information
Courtney Stephenson	42	Female	Vehicle	Vehicle thrown off I-75. Stephenson was returning from cancer treatment in Indianapolis.
Daniel Beemon	78	Male	Permanent Structure	
Linda Beemon	73	Female	Permanent Structure	Wife of Daniel Beemon.
James "Red" Brooks	48	Male	Vehicle	Died immediately following the tornado when his dump truck was thrown off US-25.

Shortly after the EF4 tornado dissipated, the parent storm system cycled and produced another devastating and fatal EF3 tornado, which impacted the village of Moscow, Ohio. This tornado caused three fatalities, as well as 13 injuries.

=== Response and recovery ===
==== Forecast office preparedness ====
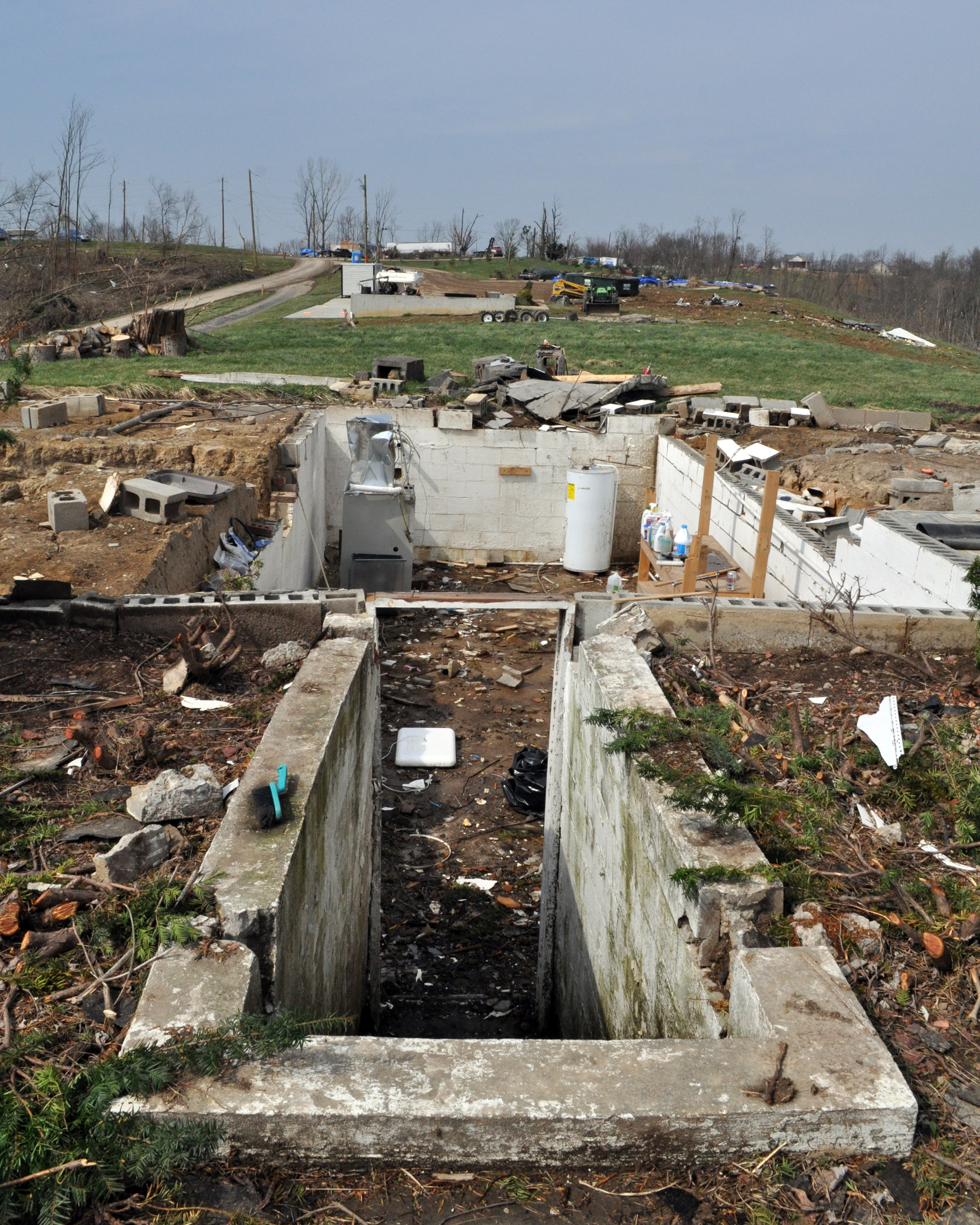
A swept home along Bagby Road, within the EF4 damage corridor of the tornado

In the aftermath of the tornado, it was acknowledged that the National Weather Service in Wilmington, Ohio, took necessary precautions and proactive measures to ensure the safety of those within the path of the tornado. At 3:50 p.m. EST (20:50 UTC), 33 minutes before the tornado touched down, the office issued a tornado emergency after detecting a developing velocity and reflectivity signature on radar. Successive tornado warnings were issued at 4:03 p.m. EST (21:03 UTC) for areas north of the storm, and 4:18 p.m. EST (21:18 UTC) for various counties surrounding the storm, including Grant and Kenton Counties. By 4:35 p.m. EST (21:35 UTC), a statement was issued by NWS Wilmington, noting the likely presence of a tornado in the Morning View area. The preemptive action of the Wilmington office to issue these warnings likely prevented more casualties.

==== Preparedness at Piner Elementary School ====
The Piner Elementary School, located in the center of Piner, escaped damage from the tornado, as the tornado passed around 3 miles (4.8 km) to the south of the building. However, due to the timing of the event, numerous students were already boarding five of the eight buses on the site of the school after they had been dismissed, making for a dangerous situation with the approaching tornado. At 3:37 p.m. EST (20:37 UTC), reporter Tim Hedrick broadcast to the area that a large and powerful tornado was approaching Piner. This provoked District Superintendent Terri Cox-Cruey to make the decision to remove the students from the buses and pull them back into the school to seek shelter. The actions of Hedrick and Cox-Cruey likely saved numerous lives, as one of the loaded buses would have directly gone through the path of the tornado. Piner Elementary School took necessary precautions against the tornado, placing all 350 students, staff, and faculty members in the cinder-block hallway located in the back of the building. In the aftermath of the tornado, the school matched every parent with their child (or children) by 9:00 p.m. EST (02:00 UTC). The homes of 20 students were rendered uninhabitable by the tornado.

=== Community response and recovery efforts ===
The Milner couple, both residents of Crittenden, are seen corresponding with a FEMA Contract Inspector on March 21 following the tornado

Following the tornado, there were several road closures in the Crittenden and Piner areas, making it more difficult for rescue services to reach affected areas. The Federal Emergency Management Agency (FEMA) assisted with recovery efforts, and 22 inmates from a nearby prison were escorted to damage sites to help clear debris from roads. Initial reports estimated that more than 60 homes were damaged within the limits of Crittenden; this value was later revised to 88 homes destroyed within the Kenton County portion of the tornado. On March 5, 2012, less than three days after the tornado took place, schools in Piner resumed their normal operations. Members of the crisis team in Piner, as well as additional parent volunteers, were present during the following school days in order to allow the children to process their emotions and cope with the potential losses that they had experienced in the tornado.

In response to the tornado, the Kenton County Rotary Club, Duke Energy, and Owen Electric collectively provided US$37,000 for the addition of new safety equipment in the Piner area, specifically tornado sirens. The area was inspected for gaps in tornado sirens; these gaps were filled by these new installations. A monument was built to acknowledge these donations and the contributions of these companies to the safety of the public. A second problem that was identified in response to the tornado was the lack of a backup generator in the Piner–Fiskburg Fire Department. The fire department submitted a grant application via the Kentucky Department of Homeland Security. This application was successful, and the department was granted $44,000 for the installation of a new generator; this generator was installed in January 2013. It was deemed "capable of sustaining the fire department at 100% power" in the case of a power outage.

A resident of Fiskburg rebuilt his home following the tornado, using tools that he borrowed from volunteers and community members. The family of the resident additionally received dinners, meals, and volunteer services from community members as they reconstructed their home over the process of one year.

The Piner Baptist Church, located in southern Kenton County, served as a major relief center during cleanup and recovery efforts in the surrounding areas. Immediately following the tornado, Judge-Executive Steve Arlinghaus and public safety officials established a command post in the church, which was one of the few undamaged and easily accessible buildings in Piner. The Kenton County Emergency Management Agency and Kenton County Police Department also facilitated response efforts. Several members of the Piner Baptist Church used their social media presence and connections in the community to gather hundreds of volunteers for relief and recovery efforts. The Piner Baptist Church also served as a site for meetings with local, state, and federal officials. By February 28, 2013, 73 building permits had been granted to victims of the tornado in Kenton County, with 47 displaced residents moving back in to their homes.

The century-old Assumption of the Blessed Virgin Mary Church in Morning View, Kentucky, which was destroyed by the tornado, was never rebuilt. Attendees of the church relocated 5 miles (8.0 km) away to St. Matthew's Catholic Church. However, a painting of "Mary's Assumption", a central piece in the church composed by Johann Schmitt, was salvaged in the aftermath of the tornado.

== See also ==
- Weather of 2012
- Tornadoes of 2012
- 2012 Henryville tornado — A fatal and long-tracked EF4 tornado in Indiana from the same parent system as the Crittenden–Piner tornado
- 2012 East Bernstadt tornado — A devastating, short-lived, and fatal Kentucky EF2 tornado from the same tornado outbreak
- 2012 West Liberty tornado — A long-lived and deadly EF3 tornado across Kentucky and West Virginia from the same outbreak, which primarily affected the town of West Liberty, Kentucky
- 2020 Cookeville tornado – A destructive and killer EF4 tornado in northern Tennessee over eight years after, which also was a short-lived storm
- 2021 Western Kentucky tornado — A very long-track and catastrophic EF4 tornado that tore across western Kentucky over nine years later
