= Tornado outbreak of March 2–3, 2012 =

Windstorms in the southern United States

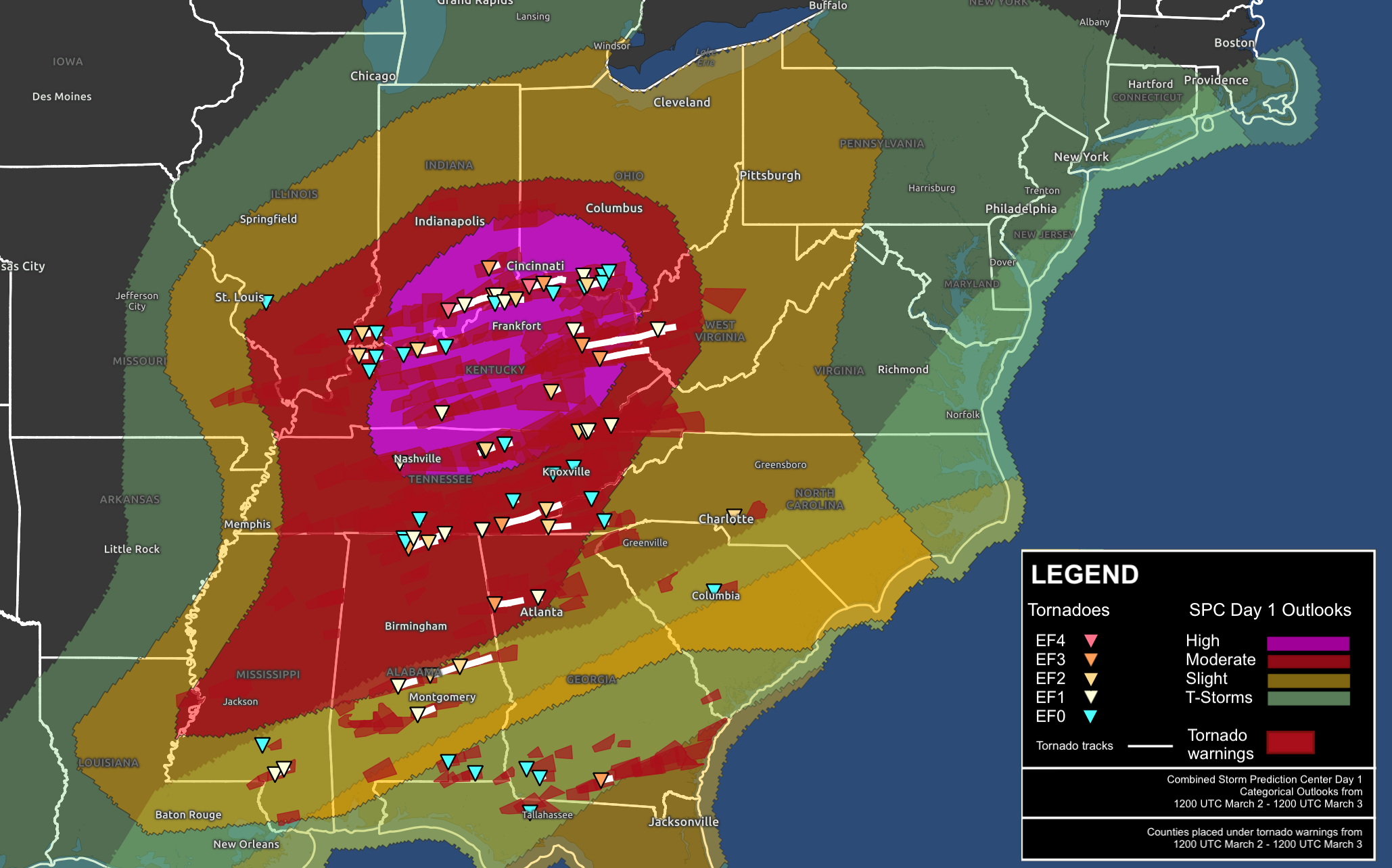
- Map of tornado warnings and confirmed tornadoes from the outbreak (from March 2–3)

Meteorological history
- Duration: March 2–3, 2012

Tornado outbreak
- Tornadoes: 70
- Max. rating: EF4 tornado
- Highest winds: Tornadic – 175 mph (282 km/h) (Henryville, Indiana & Crittenden, Kentucky EF4 on March 2)
- Highest gusts: Non-tornadic – 100 mph (160 km/h) near Bedford, Kentucky
- Largest hail: 4.25 in (10.8 cm) in diameter in two locations, on March 2

Extratropical cyclone
- Lowest pressure: 975 hPa (mbar); 28.79 inHg
- Max. snowfall: 20 inches (51 cm) in Grand Traverse County, Michigan

Overall effects
- Fatalities: 41 (+2 indirect)
- Injuries: 300+
- Damage: $3.1 billion (2012 USD)
- Areas affected: Indiana, Kentucky, Ohio, West Virginia, Dixie Alley
- Part of the tornado outbreaks of 2012 and 2011–12 North American winter

On March 2 and 3, 2012, a large and deadly tornado outbreak occurred over a large section of the Southern United States into the Ohio Valley region, spawning up to 70 tornadoes in its wake. A moderate risk of severe weather was issued for March 2 a day in advance for a large area from near Tuscaloosa, Alabama to Dayton, Ohio as an intense storm system tracked across the region in a very high shear environment, and intense tornadoes were possible. On the morning of March 2, it was upgraded and a high risk of severe weather was issued for Middle Tennessee and central Kentucky, later extended into Central and Southern Indiana and southern Ohio. The Storm Prediction Center mentioned the potential for significant tornadoes. Multiple PDS tornado watches were issued shortly thereafter.

The outbreak began fairly early in the morning, with an initial round of storms and tornadoes associated with the incoming warm front attached to a rapidly deepening low-pressure area over the central Great Lakes. One of these early day storms produced a damaging EF3 tornado that impacted Harvest, Alabama. Discrete supercells developed in the afternoon along a corridor from the South to the Ohio Valley, producing multiple intense to violent tornadoes as a result. This included a long-lived EF4 that formed just north of the Ohio River, resulting in extreme damage to numerous communities in southern Indiana, including Marysville and Henryville. Another EF4 wedge tornado killed four people and obliterated homes near Crittenden, Kentucky, while a large EF3 killed three people and destroyed most of Moscow, Ohio. At around 6:00 pm EST, an EF3 tornado impacted downtown West Liberty, Kentucky, resulting in major damage and 10 deaths. A high-end EF3 tornado also caused major damage to many homes in businesses in Salyersville, Kentucky, killing two people along its path. Another high-end EF3 tornado touched down at 8:03 pm. This storm tracked into Haralson County, Georgia, and Paulding County, Georgia, where it caused major damage in the Dallas area before dissipating. Some scattered activity occurred the following day, though an EF3 tornado caused damge in Georgia before the outbreak came to an end and the associated system moved offshore.

The storms resulted in 41 tornado-related fatalities, 22 of which occurred in Kentucky. Tornado-related deaths also occurred in Alabama, Indiana, and Ohio. The outbreak was the second deadliest in early March for the U.S. since official records began in 1950; only the 1966 Candlestick Park tornado had a higher death toll for a tornadic system in early March.

== Meteorological synopsis ==
=== March 2 ===
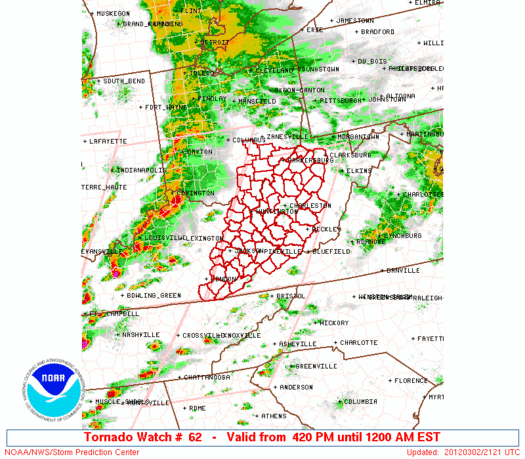
A Particularly Dangerous Situation tornado watch for mainly eastern Kentucky and western West Virginia on March 2.

One day prior on March 1, 2012, at approximately 12:30 PM EST (17:30 UTC), the NOAA Storm Prediction Center (SPC) issued a large, 45% hatched and level 4/5 moderate risk area for severe weather across the eastern United States. This large risk spanned across northern Mississippi and Alabama, into central Tennessee and Kentucky, towards southern Indiana and Ohio the following day on the 2nd. A very large mid- and upper level trough was stationed in northern Arkansas and southern Missouri, towards the Columbus, Ohio area. The trough moved slowly eastward from its position in the Ozark mountains, transporting a belt of fast southwesterly winds to the southeastern side of the storm system. This overlapped with a highly sheared region, resulting in a possibility of tornadic supercells forming and tornadoes in general, some strong per the SPC.

SPC outlooks on March 2, 2012.

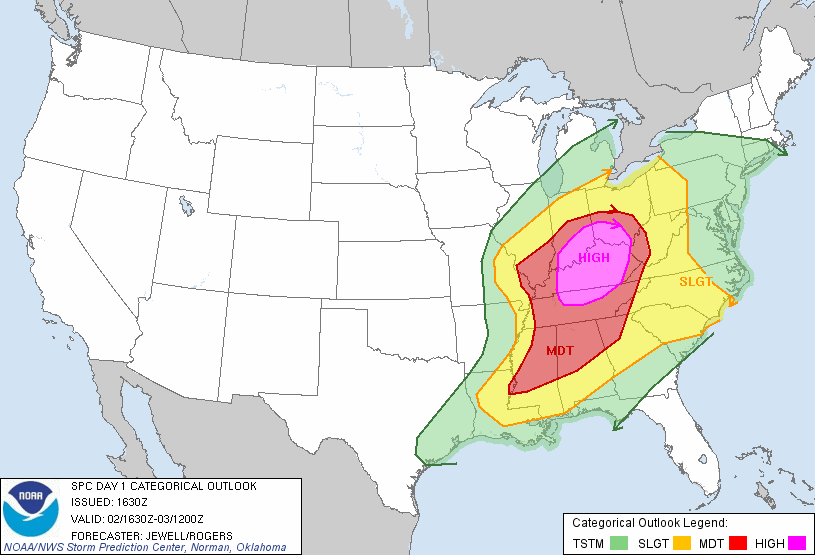
Day 1 1630z categorical outlooks.

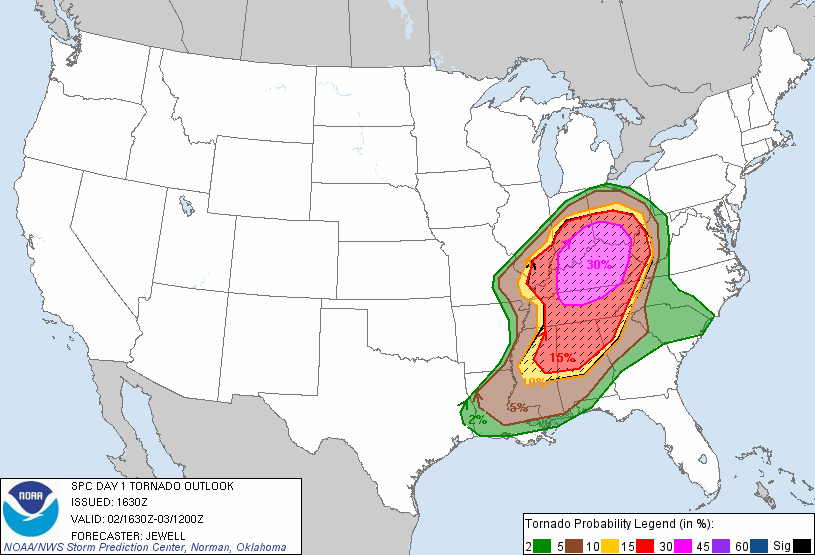
Day 1 1630z tornado outlooks.

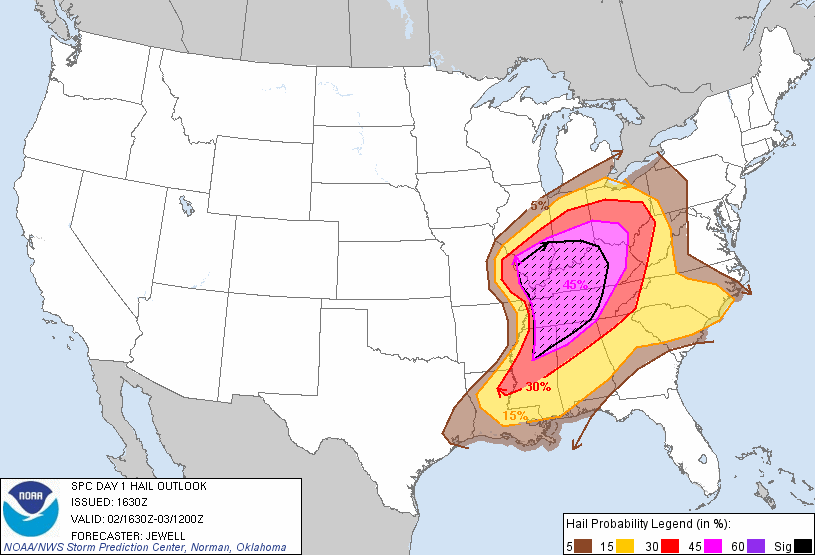
Day 1 1630z hail outlooks.

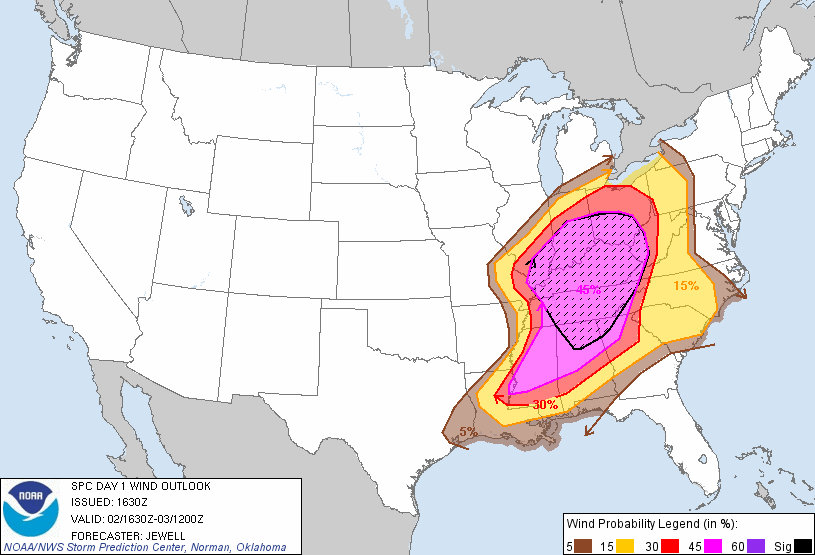
Day 1 1630z wind outlooks.

The following day on March 2 at around 8:00 PM EST (13:00 UTC), the SPC issued a Public Severe Weather Outlook (PWO), concerning a more hazardous risk for significant (EF2+) tornadoes than what was expected the day prior. A level 5/5 high risk, which corresponded to a 30% hatched tornado risk, was put in place over central Kentucky and north-central Tennessee. The moderate risk area widened to include portions of southeastern Illinois, northwestern Georgia and the western Virginias. Alongside the main tornado risk, 45% hatched hail and damaging wind risks were issued over parts of the Ohio and Tennessee River Valleys. At 11:30 PM EST (16:30 UTC), the SPC adjusted the outlooks to include southern Indiana and Ohio in the high risk. At the same time, the moderate risk extended more westward, with most of northern Mississippi encompassed by it but also a small portion in eastern Missouri. The 45% hatched wind risk extended south to northern Alabama and Georgia, where as the 45% hatched hail risk moved westward, with northern Mississippi included. The strong upper-level trough with a vorticity center moved from northern Missouri to the Ohio River Valley area. Strong wind shear with the trough created a large, unstable air mass (warm sector) that overlapped a massive region, conducive for a widespread and potentially destructive tornado outbreak.

Satellite animation of the storm system on March 2

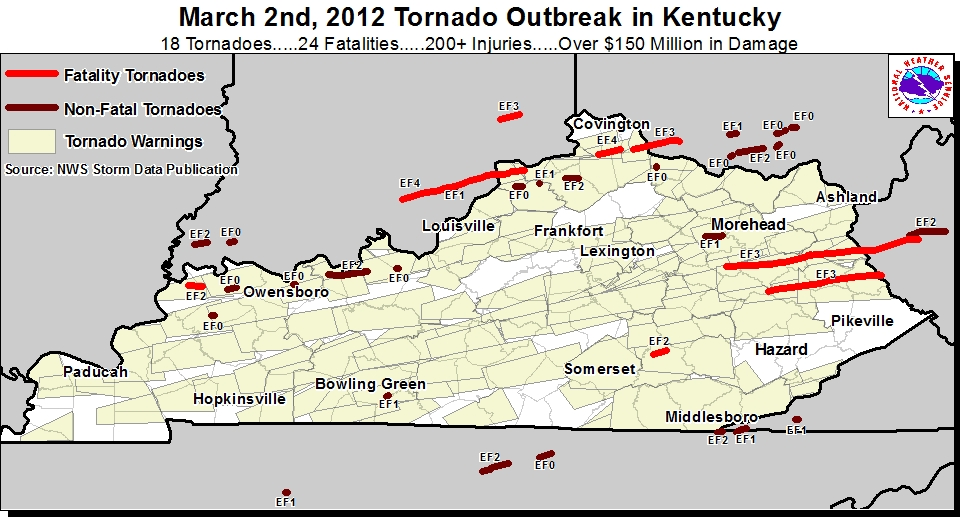
Map of Kentucky during the March 2 tornado outbreak

On the morning of March 2, 2012, around 10:30 AM EST (15:30 UTC) a tornado watch was issued by the National Weather Service across east-central Tennessee, northern Alabama and northwestern Georgia. An initial squall line that formed along the Kansas–Missouri border moved eastward across the state and towards the Tennessee/Ohio River Valley area. Some of these storms within the line showed signs of rotation. These morning storms, including one that was responsible for a damaging EF3 tornado that impacted the northern Huntsville, Alabama metropolitan area, were associated with an incoming warm front that was linked to a low pressure area, located north at the Great Lakes. After many strong tornadoes occurred throughout the warm sector, the latest and final PDS tornado watch was issued at approximately 4:20 PM EST (21:20 UTC) that covered parts of Kentucky, Ohio, West Virginia and Virginia. Many of these supercells that had a history of producing destructive tornadoes, moved towards the Appalachian Mountains later into the evening. High vertical wind shear values were present within the warm sector of the expanding extratropical cyclone, giving way for storms to produce strong tornadoes. The initial round of storms allowed for a strong warm air mass to enter the region, with temperatures rising to near-record levels for early March and instability combining with extreme wind shear, resulting in a highly volatile air mass. As a result, a second, much larger broken line of discrete supercells developed and followed the Ohio River, with additional storms developing farther south. During the afternoon, those cells tracked eastward across the Ohio Valley, passing north of Louisville, Kentucky and south of Cincinnati, Ohio with devastating results. One long-tracked EF4 tornado ripped through the Indiana towns of New Pekin, Henryville, Marysville, and Chelsea, killing 11 people. As isolated activity developed farther south, intense supercells also formed in central Kentucky in the late afternoon hours and tracked east into the Eastern Mountain Coal Fields region before weakening as they reached West Virginia later that evening. The town of West Liberty, Kentucky was devastated by a mile-wide EF3 tornado that killed 10 people.

=== March 3 ===
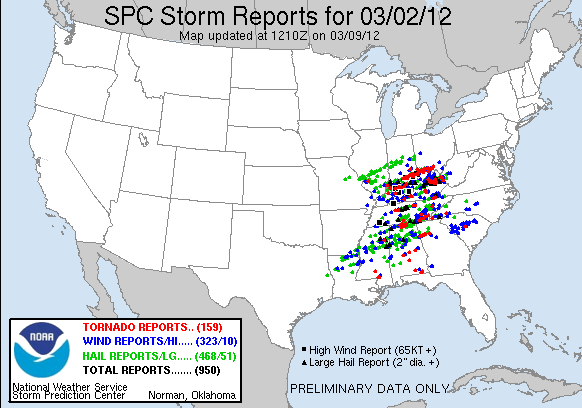

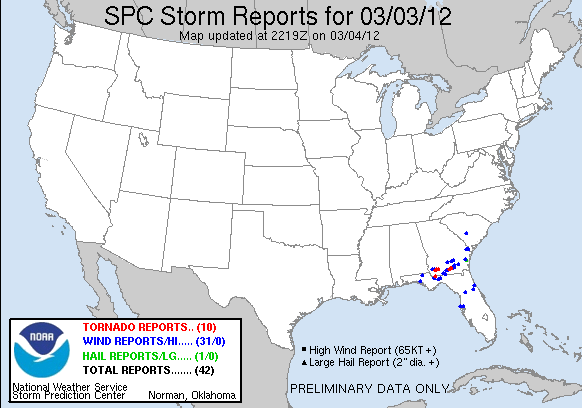
Storm reports for March 2 (top) and March 3 (bottom)

The next day, on March 3, the cold front continued to push eastwards toward the United States East Coast, although the most severe activity took place near the Georgia-Florida state border. A slight risk of severe weather was issued for a small area extending from Cape Hatteras to the Mississippi Delta. A mesoscale convective system in South Carolina was responsible for hail reports in the area, although the threat for tornadoes was reduced with lower instability levels. Most tornado activity for the day was associated with an upper-level system in Florida, and mainly consisted of isolated, weak tornadoes touching down across the Southeastern United States. However, an EF3 wedge tornado caused significant damage near Moody Air Force Base in Georgia. On March 4, most of the cold front responsible for the outbreak had already moved into the Atlantic Ocean with only a small portion of thunderstorms extending into Florida. A slight risk was issued for a section of Florida. Some scattered activity lingered around the East Coast for the duration of the day, but no additional tornadoes were reported.

== Confirmed tornadoes ==
Confirmed tornadoes by Enhanced Fujita rating
EFU	EF0	EF1	EF2	EF3	EF4	EF5	Total
0	27	18	14	9	2	0	70

=== Athens–Harvest–Hazel Green–New Market, Alabama ===
Athens–Harvest–Hazel Green–New Market, Alabama
- A view of the tornado as it moved to the north of East Limestone

Meteorological history
- Formed: March 2, 2012, 9:10 a.m. CST (UTC–06:00)
- Dissipated: March 2, 2012, 10:00 a.m. CST (UTC–06:00)
- Duration: 50 minutes

EF3 tornado
- on the Enhanced Fujita scale
- Highest winds: 140 mph (230 km/h)

Overall effects
- Fatalities: 0
- Injuries: 0

This intense tornado was the first significant tornado of the outbreak, receiving a final rating of EF3 with estimated winds up to 140 miles per hour (230 km/h). It had a path length that extending 33.99 miles (54.70 km) across northern Alabama, and a maximum width of 250 yards (230 m).

The tornado first developed near Athens Country Club and Golf Course along Hatfield Lake Road, near U.S. Route 31 in Limestone County. The tornado moved in a northeasterly direction, crossing Strain Road and Interstate 65, where it snapped and uprooted several trees. Continuing its track 1 mile (1.6 km) south of U.S. Route 72, the tornado approached and impacted the Canebrake neighborhood, in which numerous homes sustained major roof damage; some homes also had their garage doors blown out and sustained major damage to their exterior walls. Minor structural damage also occurred in the Indian Trace Community. The tornado then crossed U.S. Route 72 near Piney Creek and continued tracking to the northeast. Along Mooresville Road and Pepper Road, homes would sustained severe damage, including major roof loss. A brick garage was collapsed, and several trees were snapped and uprooted. As the tornado continued its track, approaching and crossing McCulley Mill Road, multiple other homes were significantly damaged, including those along Nick Davis Road. Damage continued across Eagle Point Drive and Freedom Drive, where a home had its roof completely ripped away. Other nearby homes sustained major roof loss, shattered windows, and collapsed garages.

Significant damage to residences in the Athens area

After causing significant damage in Athens, the tornado continued its track into Madison County, quickly moving towards Harvest. A single-wide modular home lost much of its roof just north of Orville Smith Road. Major structural damage occurred at the intersection of Yarbrough Road across Bridges Drive and Bedford Lane. The tornado also snapped power poles near their bases in this area. Damage continued to occur across Alabama State Route 53, just south of Jeff Road. The tornado snapped and uprooted trees along Quarter Mountain Road, Carters Gin Road, and Beaver Dam Road. More significant damage took place along Patterson Lane, between Mount Lebanon Road and Harwell Lane, where wood power poles were snapped, large quantities trees were uprooted, and numerous homes sustained roof loss. A large metal barn/shed lost its roof and some of its walls were collapsed inward. Damage persisted along U.S. Route 231 at Meridianville Middle School, where a concrete power pole was snapped and minor roof damage occurred to nearby buildings.

The tornado then began to strengthen as it approached and hit Hubert Road and Walker Lane. In this area, high-end EF2 to low-end EF3 damage occurred, as several single-story homes were destroyed, with all of their walls completely collapsed. Other homes sustained significant damage with complete roof loss and exterior wall failure. The estimated maximum path width in this area was 200–250 yards (180–230 m) wide. Just to the northeast along Charley Patterson Road, multiple structures again sustained EF3 damage, where three brick veneer and cinder block foundation homes were destroyed by the tornado. The tornado continued to produce significant damage along Butler Road, where additional concrete poles were snapped and large hardwood oak trees were snapped and uprooted. The tornado passed just north of New Market and near Hillsboro, where it began to weaken, still continuing to snap and uproot trees. The tornado also ripped away roof shingles from homes in this area. Along Davis Road, just south of Moe Road, trees were snapped or uprooted, with severe shingle loss to a house about 200 yards (180 m) away from the road. Beyond this, the tornado underwent a weakening trend and lifted as it moved across the higher plateau region of northeastern Madison County.

=== Harrison–Cleveland–Etowah, Tennessee ===
Harrison–Cleveland–Etowah, Tennessee
- The tornado, as seen near the unincorporated community of Delano

Meteorological history
- Formed: March 2, 2012, 12:41 p.m. EST (UTC-05:00)
- Dissipated: March 2, 2012, 1:35 p.m. EST (UTC-05:00)
- Duration: 54 minutes

EF3 tornado
- on the Enhanced Fujita scale
- Highest winds: 165 mph (266 km/h)

Overall effects
- Fatalities: 0
- Injuries: 44
- Damage: $35.29 million (2012 USD)

This tornado was the strongest and longest-track tornado to occur in the Southeastern United States during the outbreak sequence, with a maximum windspeed estimate of 165 mph (266 km/h) and a path length of approximately 41 mph (66 km/h) across portions of southeastern Tennessee. The tornado also had a maximum width estimate of 400 yards (370 m). 44 people were injured, but no deaths were attributed to this tornado.

The tornado first touched down on a northward-extending peninsula in Chickamauga Lake, just north of the Booker T. Washington State Park, initially downing a few trees and causing light structural damage. The tornado then moved east-northeast and crossed Waconga Bay, where, on the eastern side of the bay, it severely damaged Island Cove Marina, causing an estimated $6 million in damage. The tornado was at EF1 intensity at this time, and had winds up to 110 miles per hour (180 km/h). At this point, it had traveled a total of 2 miles (3.2 km).

The tornado continued to strengthen as it moved back onto land, crossing Tennessee State Route 58 and rapidly strengthening to EF2 intensity. Over the next 2 miles (3.2 km), the tornado caused damage in several neighborhoods, with winds consistent with EF2–EF3 intensity. The most intense damage was along Short Tail Springs Road, Woodland Bay Drive, and Davis Mill Circle, where many homes suffered EF3 damage. One residence completely swept from its foundation, and an entire forest of trees south of Short Tail Springs Road was completely downed. After leaving the neighborhood, the tornado maintained EF2 intensity. It moved across several inlets of Chickamauga Lake, emerging at EF1 strength by the time it crossed Ooltewah-Georgetown Road.

The tornado continued into Bradley County, where it then moved into the northern side of Cleveland. Large swaths of trees were downed near Interstate 75 at EF2 intensity. 46 homes were impacted by the tornado, including five that were completely destroyed and an additional 11 that sustained major damage. Two businesses and three barns were destroyed. Seven people were injured by the tornado in Bradley County. Crossing the Hiwassee River, the tornado moved into Polk County at EF0 intensity, maintaining this intensity for another 6 miles (9.7 km). It downed numerous trees and large limbs, before beginning to intensify again in Linsdale near Dentville Rd. In this area, another 10 homes were damaged, and five barns were destroyed. No injuries or deaths were reported in Polk County.

The tornado continued into McMinn County, where it restrengthened further to EF2 intensity, causing significant damage to several homes in rural areas south of Etowah, near the unincorporated community of Carlock. Exhibiting a weakening trend, the tornado overtook U.S. Route 411 and began to cross into the northern terrain of Starr Mountain. It dissipated shortly afterwards. In McMinn County, a combination of 37 homes and mobile homes were damaged, with four homes and seven mobile homes destroyed. Seven injuries were reported in McMinn County.

=== New Pekin–Henryville–Chelsea, Indiana/Bedford, Kentucky ===
New Pekin–Henryville–Chelsea, Indiana/Bedford, Kentucky
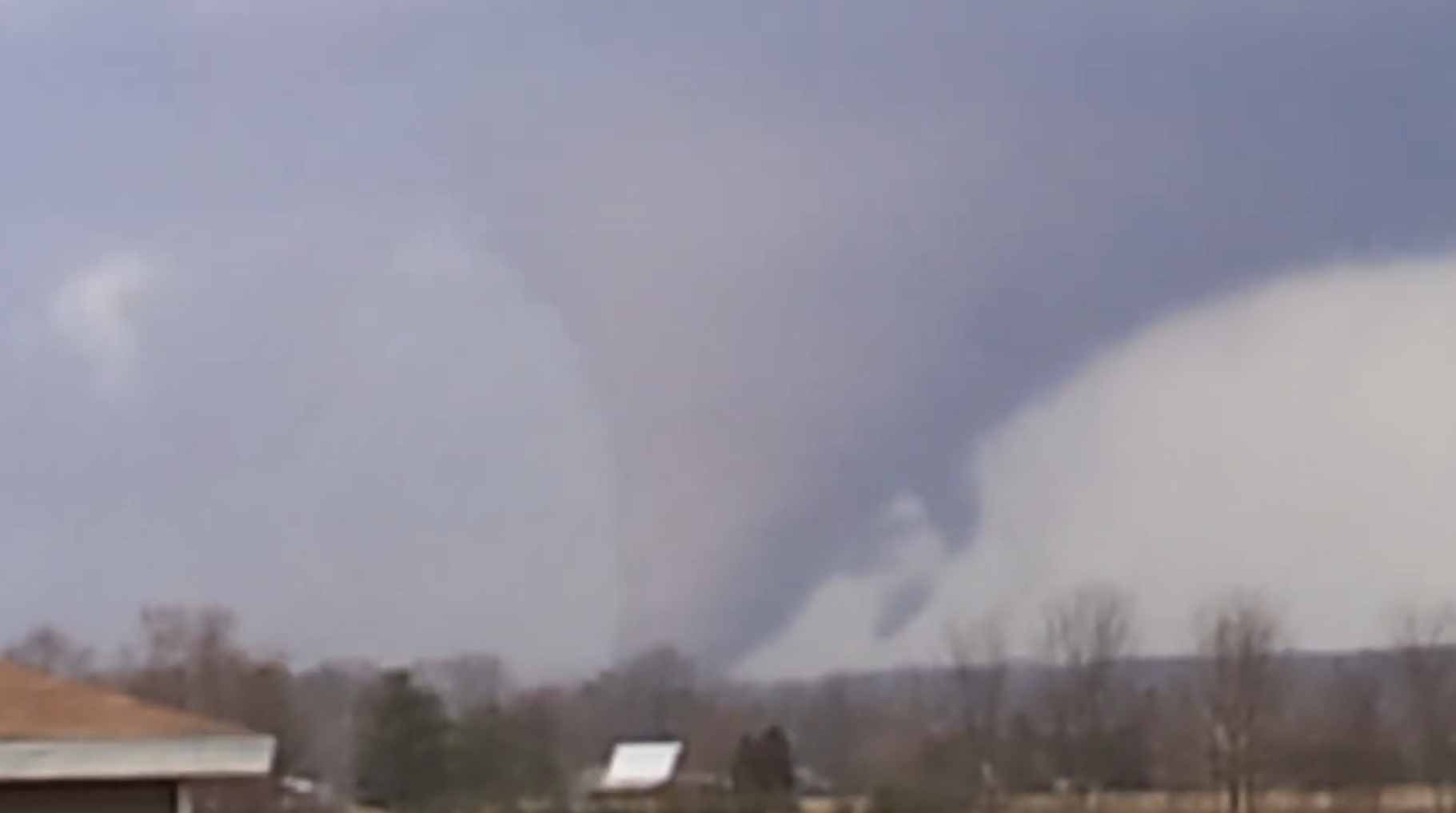
- The tornado seen near Memphis, Indiana.

Meteorological history
- Formed: March 2, 2012, 2:50 p.m. EST (UTC−05:00)
- Dissipated: March 2, 2012, 3:39 p.m. EST (UTC−05:00)
- Duration: 49 minutes

EF4 tornado
- on the Enhanced Fujita scale
- Highest winds: 175 mph (282 km/h)

Overall effects
- Fatalities: 11
- Injuries: Unknown
- Damage: $58.575 million (2012 USD)

This violent stovepipe tornado, which carved a 49 mi (79 km) path of damage from Fredericksburg, Indiana to the Bedford, Kentucky area, was the deadliest tornado of the outbreak. Along its track, the tornado destroyed hundreds of homes and killed 11 people. Countless were injured. The most severe damage took place in and around the small communities of New Pekin, Henryville, Marysville and Chelsea, Indiana.

The tornado first touched down in Washington County around 2:50 p.m. EST at the south edge of Fredericksburg, snapping trees at EF1 strength along a narrow path as it moved to the northeast. Several minutes later, the tornado intensified to high-end EF2 strength as it destroyed a metal truss tower and snapped numerous trees. The tornado intensified further as it passed to the north of Palmyra, where it crossed SR 135 and ripped 6 in (15 cm) thick slabs of asphalt off the roadway and tossed them 10 to 30 yd (9.1 to 27.4 m). Smaller pieces of pavement were found up to a quarter-mile away. Just beyond this point, the tornado path began to widen and tremendous tree damage was observed. Homes in this area sustained damage ranging from EF2 to EF3 in intensity. As it neared the south side of New Pekin, the tornado widened and strengthened even more. By this time, it reached EF4 strength with winds estimated at 170 mph (270 km/h). The tornado clipped the southern fringes of town, and a large factory building was leveled to its foundation with large amounts of debris swept away. Anchor bolts were bent at this location, and debris from the factory was scattered up to 0.75 mi (1.21 km) downwind. A metal building on the edge of the circulation had metal sheeting pulled off, apparently from the force of inbound winds towards the circulation. Nearby, an entire family of five was killed when their mobile home was obliterated. Several other homes and mobile homes were heavily damaged or destroyed in the New Pekin area as well. As it neared the Clark County border, the tornado produced high-end EF3 to EF4 strength damage to many homes and farmsteads as it traversed rural areas. One brick home at the top of a ridge was completely leveled, and a heavy trailer cab from this location was found a quarter-mile away at the remains of another destroyed brick home. Several cows missing from this vicinity were never located, and thousands of trees were mowed down along a swath up to a half-mile wide. Outbuildings and grain bins were also destroyed, and a car was thrown 100 yd (91 m) from one residence as well.

The tornado maintained EF4 strength as it crossed into Clark County, completely leveling several well-built homes shortly after crossing the county line. However, the tornado weakened briefly further to the northeast, as two double-wide mobile homes were destroyed at EF2 intensity, while a frame home sustained EF3 damage. One man was killed in one of the mobile homes shortly after he recorded video of the approaching tornado. Outbuildings were destroyed, and a few other homes along this segment of the path sustained minor to moderate damage. As the tornado crossed Interstate 65, it restrengthened to EF4 intensity and serious injuries occurred as multiple vehicles were tossed and semi-trucks were flipped. The highway was closed for hours, and multiple people had to be extracted from their crumpled vehicles.

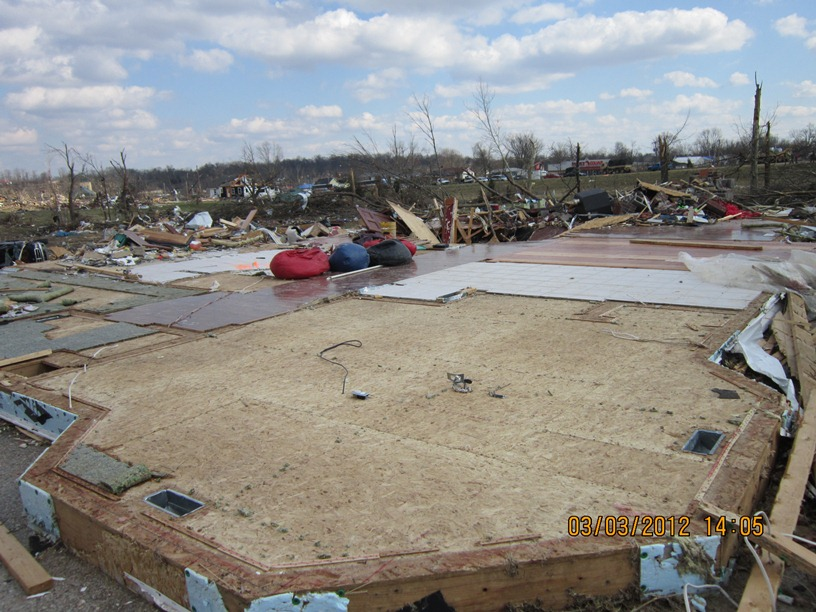
A large home along North Francke Road, in Henryville that was leveled off its foundation at EF4 intensity. Winds were estimated at 175 mph at this location.

Immediately east of the interstate, the tornado ripped through the town of Henryville, resulting in devastating damage throughout the town. The Henryville school complex was in the process of dismissing as the tornado approached the community, and sustained EF4 structural damage including total destruction of its cafeteria. Most of the staff and students had already left the area by the time the tornado struck. One bus driver saved numerous student's lives by returning to the school. The small group of students that returned and took shelter in the school building survived without injury, despite being inside as it was destroyed around them. Many cars in the school parking lot were thrown and destroyed, one of which had a wooden beam speared through its hood and out of its undercarriage. The school security cameras recorded video of the tornado striking the building, and it is still viewable on YouTube to this day. Low-level winds in this area were so intense that debris was found wedged underneath plastic reflective strips in the parking lot. School buses were thrown hundreds of feet away, and two were ripped from their chassis. One bus was thrown through the front wall of a nearby restaurant, while a gas station, several large metal industrial buildings, and multiple other businesses and structures in town were severely damaged or destroyed. Numerous homes in and around Henryville were destroyed, and some were flattened or swept from their foundations. The tornado was at its most intense stage when in the Henryville area, with winds estimated at 175 mph (282 km/h). Damage surveyors found evidence of very intense multiple vortices as the tornado entered the community. Massive deforestation occurred in heavily wooded areas around town, and debris from Henryville was found as far east as Ohio.

Past Henryville, the tornado dramatically weakened and lost its ominous shape, taking on a narrow rope-like appearance and inflicting only EF1 damage. However, this phase was short-lived as the tornado quickly re-intensified into a high-end EF3 storm with a dramatic multiple-vortex structure. The tornado moved east and struck the small town of Marysville, heavily damaging or destroying many of the structures in the small community. Several block foundation homes in town were swept away with debris scattered through nearby farm fields. Vehicles were tossed, many trees were snapped and denuded, outbuildings were destroyed, and a church was damaged in the Marysville area as well. Damage surveys in this area showed a complex damage pattern, with evidence of sub-vortices developing well away from the main damage path, before either being pulled in and absorbed by the central tornadic circulation, or intensifying and becoming the primary circulation themselves at times. Aerial flyovers revealed extensive cycloidal scouring marks in farm fields outside of Marysville. EF3 damage continued to the east of Marysville as several homes and double-wide mobile homes were destroyed, with debris from the mobile homes scattered up to a mile downwind. The tornado then briefly entered Scott County, regaining EF4 intensity and killing a man in the complete destruction of his frame home, obliterating five mobile homes, and severely damaging two other frame homes. The tornado then briefly crossed back into Clark County, causing major damage to two homes and several power poles before entering Jefferson County as an EF4.

In Jefferson County, the tornado skirted the south edge of the small community of Chelsea, completely leveling several well-built homes. An older farm home was swept cleanly away in this area, killing three people inside. Debris was scattered hundreds of yards through nearby fields, cars were thrown 75 yards away, and a piece of farm machinery was thrown 200 yards. Another home was lifted from its foundation and dragged 65 yards into a field while left relatively intact. An above ground pool missing from this area after the tornado was never found, and multiple trees were ripped out of the ground by their roots and thrown. One other person was also killed at another home in the Chelsea area as well. The tornado then narrowed, weakened to EF2 intensity, and crossed into Trimble County, Kentucky, destroying barns, mobile homes, and downing many trees and power lines before dissipating near the town of Bedford.

Days after the outbreak, a New Pekin resident began helping others recover lost items through a Facebook page called "I Found Your Memory." Items such as high school diplomas were tossed as far away as Cincinnati; however, they were able to be returned through this page. Relief centers were opened in the heart of Henryville with the Henryville Community Church becoming the main center over the next weeks and months. On March 8, a long term recovery group, March2Recovery was formed to deal with the aftermath and rebuilding in the five affected counties. By March 14, FEMA deployed mobile disaster recovery centers across areas affected by the tornado outbreak. One of these centers was planned to be opened up on March 16 in New Pekin. A local baseball team in southern Indiana began raising money on March 14 to help those injured pay for their medical fees.

In 2022, the National Weather Service office in Louisville referred to a possible EF5 damage location at a demolished house, where a pickup truck was blown away and never found and a backhoe was deposited into the basement of the house.

=== Crittenden–Piner–Morning View, Kentucky ===
Crittenden–Piner–Morning View, Kentucky
- A photo of the tornado as it was seen on I-75 near Crittenden.

Meteorological history
- Formed: March 2, 2012, 4:23 p.m. EST (UTC−05:00)
- Dissipated: March 2, 2012, 4:32 p.m. EST (UTC−05:00)
- Duration: 9 minutes

EF4 tornado
- on the Enhanced Fujita scale
- Highest winds: 175 mph (282 km/h)

Overall effects
- Fatalities: 4
- Injuries: 8
- Damage: $20.5 million (2012 USD)

This large, violent, rain-wrapped but short lived wedge tornado was spawned by the same supercell thunderstorm that produced the EF4 tornado that struck Henryville, Indiana. While not a long-lived tornado, the damage it produced was very intense along portions of its 9.85-mile long path through parts of northern Kentucky. After the parent supercell had crossed into Kentucky and the Henryville tornado had lifted, the storm began to rotate significantly again as it approached the Grant County city of Crittenden.

At 4:23 PM, the supercell produced a strong tornado that touched down in the northern part of Crittenden, and immediately began producing significant damage as it impacted multiple residential subdivisions. The worst damage in town was along Barley Circle, within the Harvester subdivision, where many two-story homes were heavily damaged with some losing roofs and exterior walls. Damage to homes in the town of Crittenden ranged from EF1 to low-end EF3 in intensity.

As the tornado exited Crittenden into Kenton County, it intensified further as it crossed I-75 and hurled vehicles off of the highway, killing one woman. The tornado then approached and crossed US 25, reaching EF4 intensity and completely sweeping away five frame homes along Old Lexington Pike. Two of which were anchored to their foundations, though the anchoring mechanisms were too widely spaced, negating a higher rating.

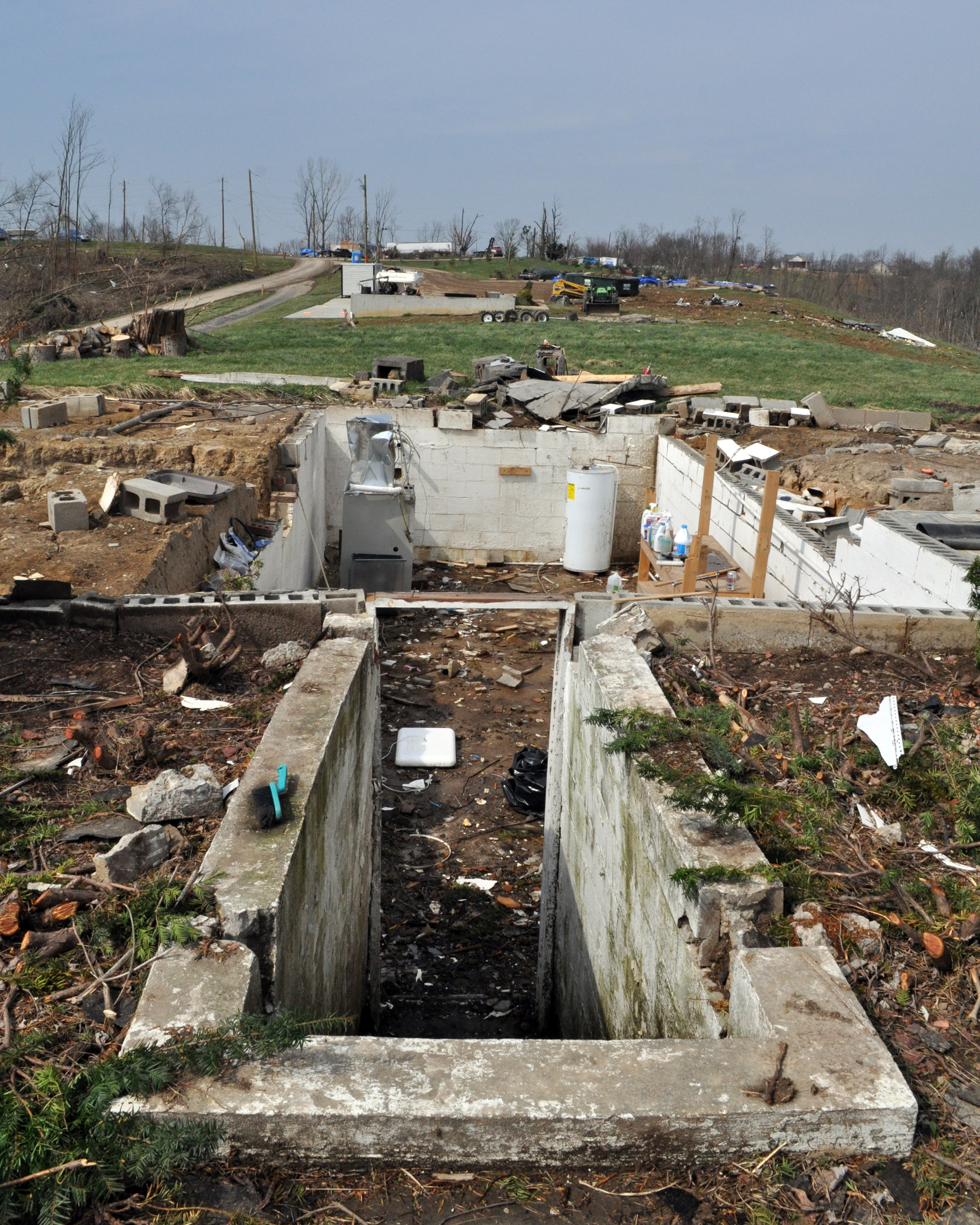
Remains of a house along Bagby Road that was completely swept away.

Further along the path, EF4 winds were sustained as two homes were completely leveled and multiple outbuildings were obliterated along Bagby Road. Extremely intense vehicle damage occurred in this area as multiple vehicles were lofted long distances through the air and mangled. One vehicle was carried over 600 yards from where it originated. Many large trees were snapped and uprooted in this area as well, including some that were completely denuded and sustained severe debarking. Three additional deaths occurred along this segment of the path, with two of the fatalities occurring in a frame home and the other taking place in a vehicle. The tornado continued to the southwest and south of Piner, weakening back to EF3 strength as it traversed rural areas. Well-built frame homes along Carlisle Road in this segment of the path had their roofs ripped off and exterior walls collapsed. Numerous single-wide and double-wide mobile homes were completely destroyed in this area as well.

Continuing further to the east, the tornado continued to weaken as it approached Fiskburg and Morning View, causing a mixture of EF1 and EF2 damage to structures on KY 17 before dissipating. Overall, this tornado killed four people and injured 8 others along its path, reaching a maximum width of 880 yards, or half a mile. As the storm was moving through northern Kentucky, large amounts of debris was observed falling out of the sky, which caused the Cincinnati/Northern Kentucky International Airport to stop all flights for one hour. It was the first and last tornado in the state to be rated EF4 until the 2021 Western Kentucky tornado in December of that year, over 9 years later.

=== Peach Grove, Kentucky/Moscow–Hammersville, Ohio ===
Peach Grove, Kentucky/Moscow–Hammersville, Ohio
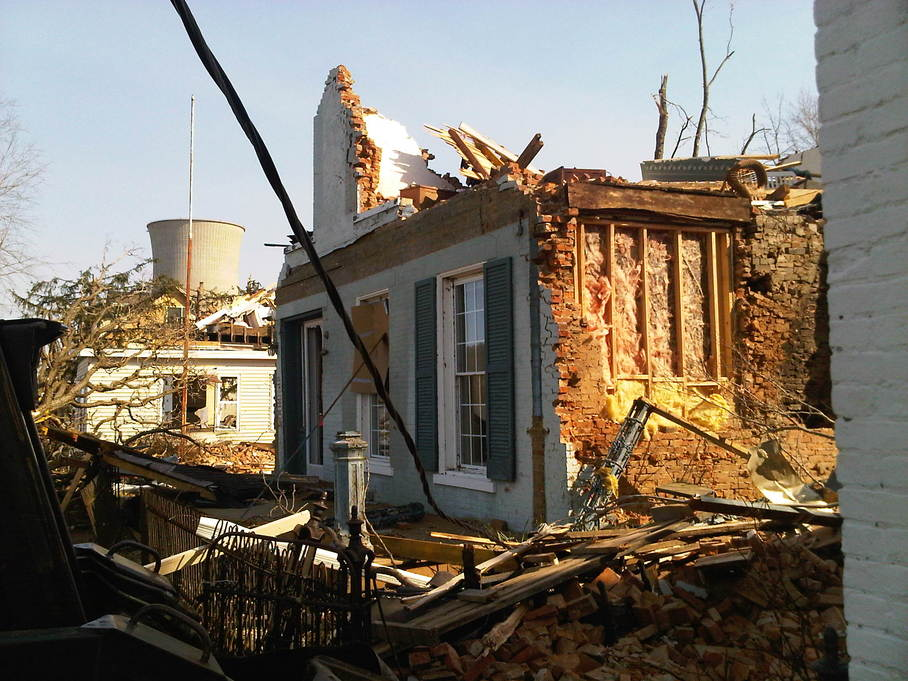
- EF3 damage to a two-story brick home in Moscow, Ohio.

Meteorological history
- Formed: March 2, 2012, 4:39 p.m. EST (UTC−05:00)
- Dissipated: March 2, 2012, 5:02 p.m. EST (UTC−05:00)
- Duration: 23 minutes

EF3 tornado
- on the Enhanced Fujita scale
- Highest winds: 160 mph (260 km/h)

Overall effects
- Fatalities: 3
- Injuries: 13

After producing the violent Henryville, Indiana and Crittenden, Kentucky EF4 tornadoes, the same parent supercell entered Campbell County and produced another tornado to the west of Peach Grove at 4:39 PM. This rain-wrapped wedge tornado moved east and reached high-end EF3 intensity as it neared the Pendleton County line, damaging or destroying several homes in the area. Damage surveyors noted some modular block foundation homes in this area that were lifted into the air intact, before being thrown in excess of 100 yards and smashed back to the ground, completely obliterating them. 100 mph (160 km/h) straight line winds from the parent supercell caused additional damage away from the main damage path in this area as well.

After crossing into Pendleton County, the tornado produced a mixture of EF2 and EF3 damage as it passed north of Peach Grove. Multiple homes, mobile homes, barns, and outbuildings along this segment of the path were destroyed, and many trees were snapped and uprooted as well. The tornado then continued across the Ohio River into Clermont County, Ohio, immediately slamming into the small riverside village of Moscow at high-end EF3 intensity. Moscow was devastated by the tornado, with 80% of the village being heavily damaged or destroyed. Numerous two story homes had roofs and exterior walls ripped off, and a few homes in town were completely flattened. Almost every tree in Moscow was uprooted, snapped, or denuded by the tornado. A 64-year-old woman was found dead in the rubble of her home, and several other residents were injured.

Beyond Moscow, the tornado continued through rural areas of Clermont County, damaging and destroying many additional homes and outbuildings, snapping many trees, as well and killing two other people in the destruction of a mobile home. The tornado then crossed into Brown County, weakening to EF1 strength as it passed near the town of Hamersville. Damage along this portion of the path consisted of roof damage to homes, damage to trees, outbuildings destroyed, and mobile homes blown off of their foundations and severely damaged. The tornado then lifted to the south of Hamersville.

Overall, this tornado killed three people along its path and injured 13 others. It attained a maximum width of one quarter-mile and had estimated peak winds of 160 mph (260 km/h).

=== Ezel–West Liberty, Kentucky/Dunlow–Ranger, West Virginia ===
West Liberty, Kentucky/Dunlow–Cove Gap, West Virginia
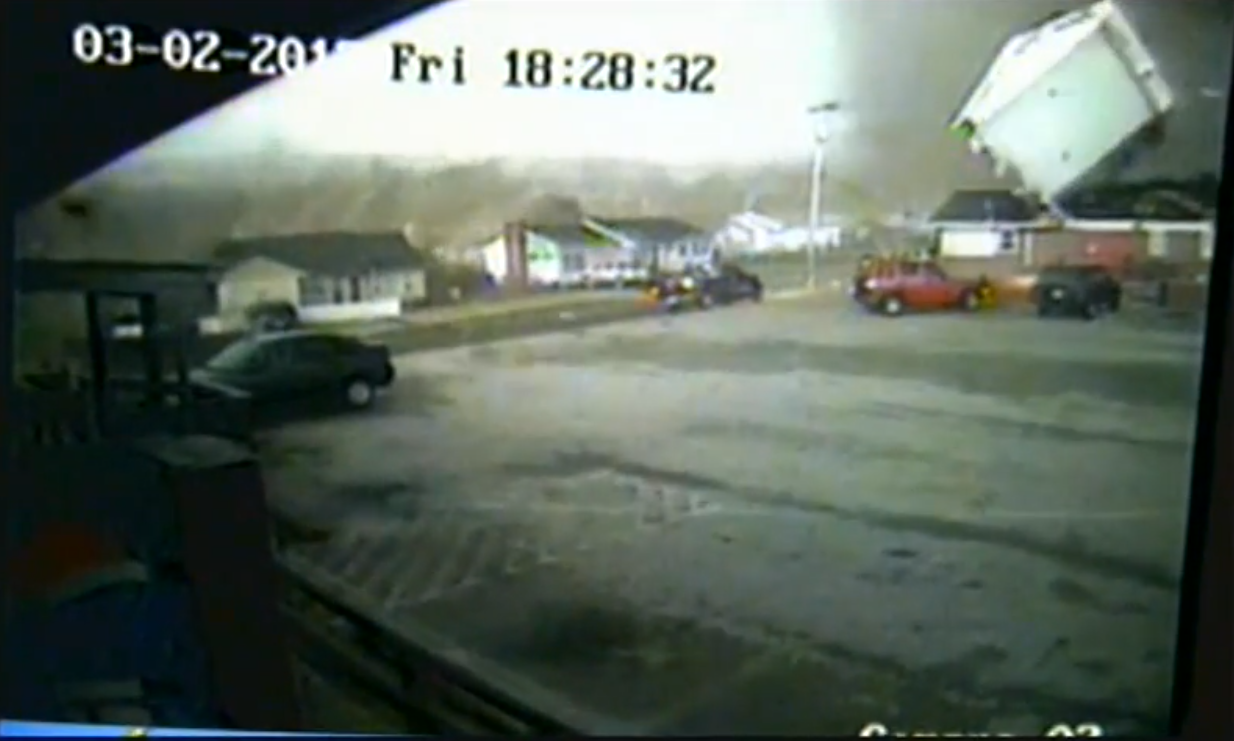
- CCTV still of the tornado in West Liberty.

Meteorological history
- Formed: March 2, 2012, 5:39 p.m. EST (UTC−05:00)
- Dissipated: March 2, 2012, 7:07 p.m. EST (UTC−05:00)
- Duration: 1 hour, 28 minutes

EF3 tornado
- on the Enhanced Fujita scale
- Highest winds: 140–150 mph (230–240 km/h)

Overall effects
- Fatalities: 10
- Injuries: 118
- Damage: $81.475 million (2012 USD)

This deadly, long-tracked EF3 tornado first touched down in Menifee County, Kentucky to the southwest of Mariba. It rapidly attained EF3 strength before moving east and passing to the south of Wellington, heavily damaging or destroying multiple homes along this segment of the path, snapping or uprooting many large trees, killing two people, and injuring many others. One block foundation home was removed from its foundation and leveled, while a nearby brick home lost its roof and exterior walls. A brick split-level home had only its basement floor remaining, with the rest of the house being completely carried away and disintegrated. Structural debris and house contents from this location was strewn long distances across nearby hillsides.

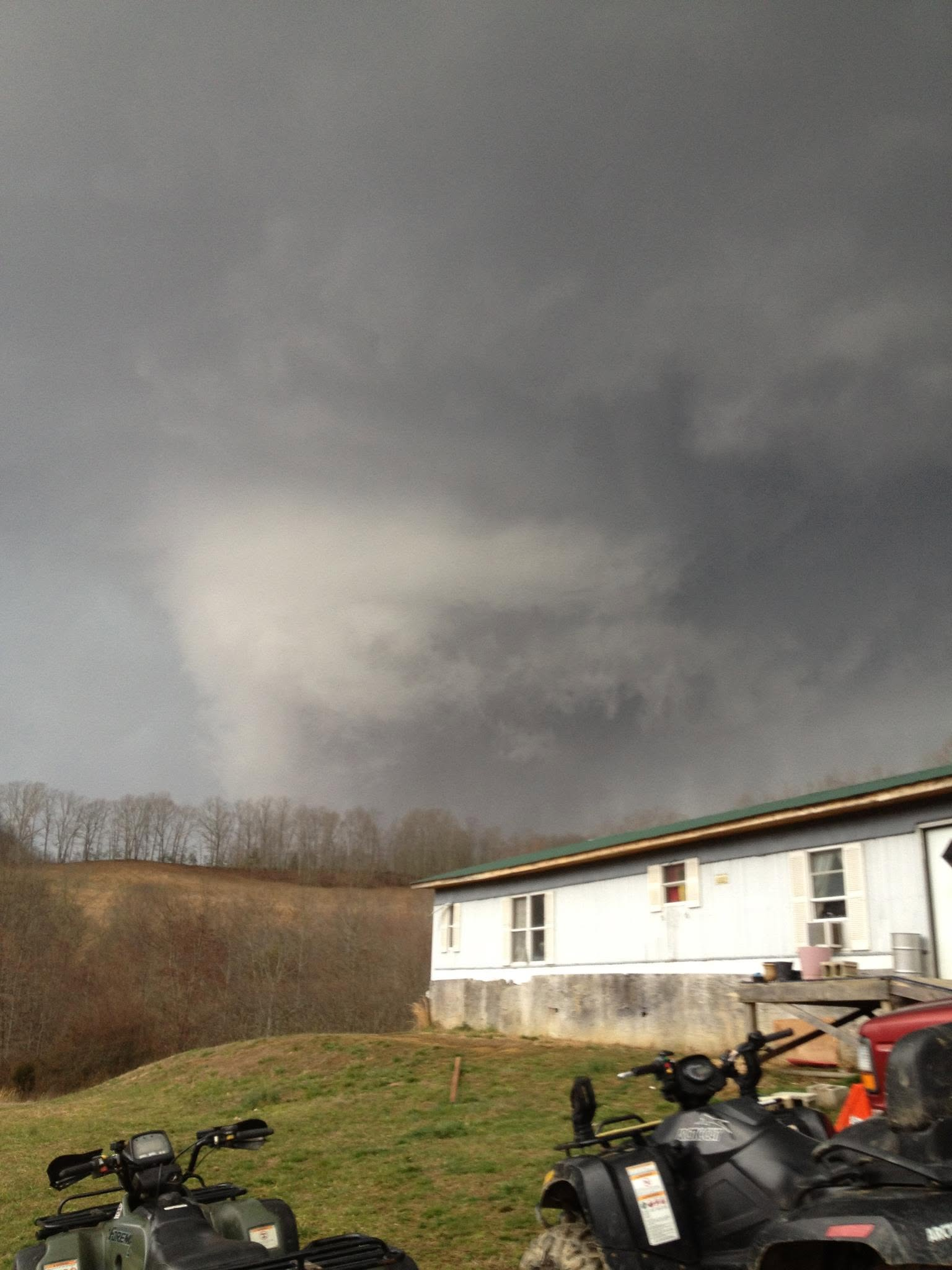
View of the tornado in the Woodsbend, Kentucky area.

Further east, the tornado expanded to nearly a mile wide and entered Morgan County, passing north of Ezel before ripping directly through Woodsbend, and afterwards downtown West Liberty at EF3 strength, resulting in catastrophic damage. Massive structural damage occurred in downtown West Liberty, with many brick buildings and businesses being heavily damaged or destroyed, and many vehicles being tossed against buildings or crushed by falling structural debris. Every building in and around the downtown area sustained major damage, with the 105-year-old courthouse, the depression-era WPA building that housed the community center, and the 100-year-old West Liberty United Methodist and Christian churches all being either heavily damaged or suffering total destruction. The local hospital sustained major damage as well. Residential areas in town were also devastated with numerous homes destroyed, including some unanchored homes that were swept from their foundations. Footage of the tornado in this area revealed a rapidly rotating lowered cloud base with a large debris cloud underneath, but no visible condensation funnel. Six people were killed in West Liberty, and many others were injured, some severely. Past West Liberty, the tornado continued through other rural portions of the county, expanding up to a full mile wide as it snapped thousands of trees and caused extensive damage to structures.

Maintaining EF3 strength, the tornado then briefly moved through a portion of Lawrence County near the community of Terryville, obliterating several mobile homes and injuring two people. Crossing into Johnson County, the tornado weakened to EF1 strength as downed many trees and caused roof damage to several structures before crossing back into Lawrence County and regaining EF3 strength as it passed near Martha, Blaine, and a few other rural communities further to the east. 30 homes and mobile homes were destroyed along this segment of the path, 9 others sustained major damage, and the Blaine community building was damaged as well. A double-wide mobile home was lofted and slammed into a hillside by the tornado, killing two people inside. The tornado then crossed the state border into Wayne County, West Virginia.

Continuing at EF3 strength, the tornado snapped and uprooted numerous trees as it approached the community of Dunlow. The tornado then impacted the northern fringes of Dunlow, destroying five homes and severely damaging another. Three vehicles were damaged as well. At the nearby East Lynn Lake campground, many trees, electrical lines, and telephone lines were downed. Further along the path, the tornado passed near Cove Gap, destroying 15 homes and inflicting major damage to 7 others. This included a two-story home that had its roof and multiple exterior and interior walls torn away. Narrow roads and hillsides in the area were left covered in fallen trees and power lines, pieces of sheet metal roofing, and damaged vehicles. Ironically, a funeral in the area that evening may have saved several lives since it was being held in a nearby community for a Cove Gap resident at the time of the tornado. Several neighbors attended the funeral and were not at home when the storm hit, only later to return to find their homes damaged or destroyed.

The tornado continued into Lincoln County, weakening to EF1 strength and downing additional trees before dissipating to the east of Ranger. This tornado was on the ground for 86 miles with a peak width of 1 mile. 10 people were killed along the path and 112 others were injured. The tornado was the first F3/EF3 in Eastern Kentucky since 1988.

=== Salyersville–Hager Hill–Lovely, Kentucky/Kermit, West Virginia ===
Salyersville–Hager Hill–Lovely, Kentucky/Kermit, West Virginia
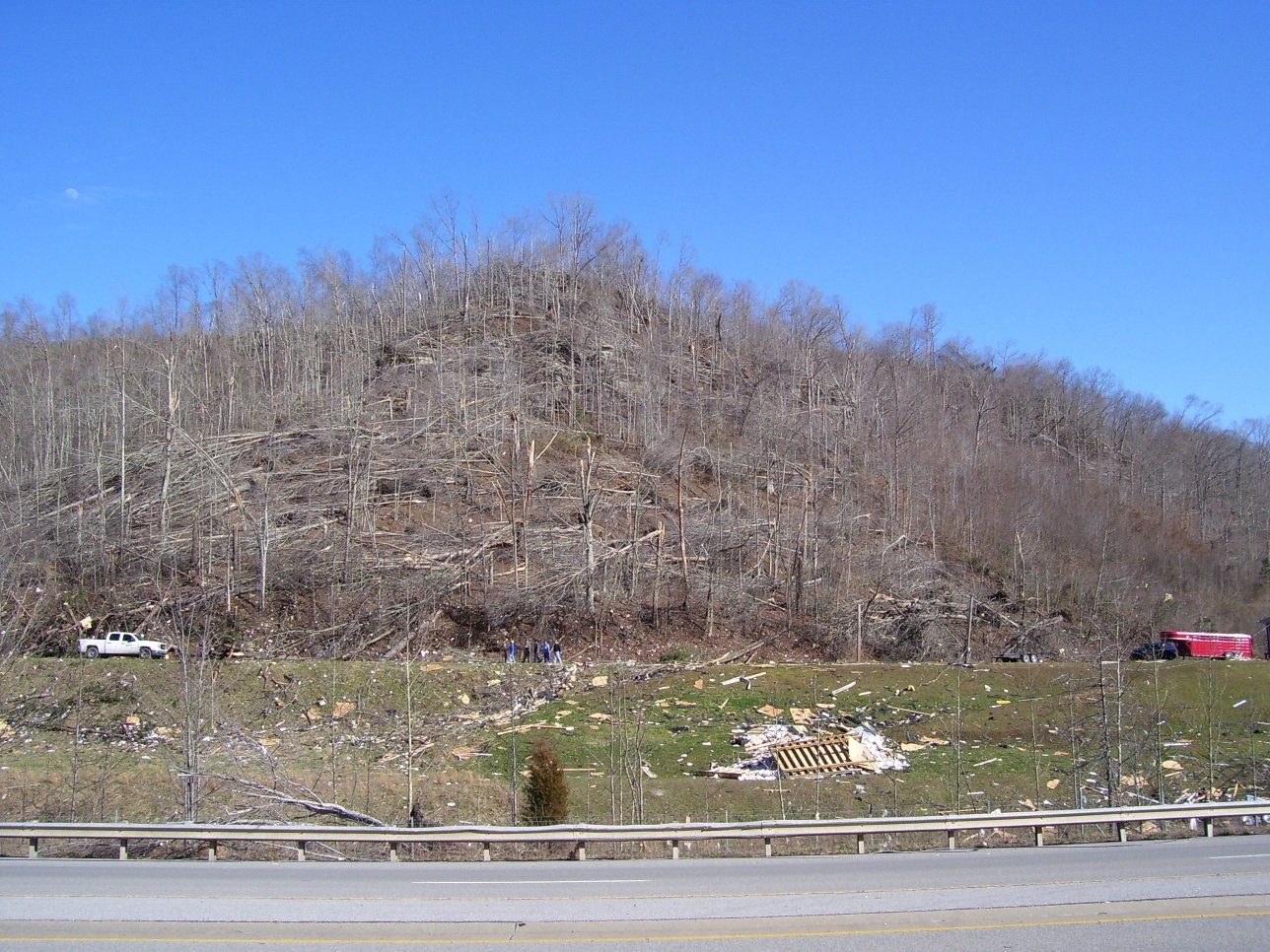
- Damage along Highway 3

Meteorological history
- Formed: March 2, 2012, 6:50 p.m. EST (UTC−05:00)
- Dissipated: March 2, 2012, 7:42 p.m. EST (UTC−05:00)
- Duration: 52 minutes

EF3 tornado
- on the Enhanced Fujita scale
- Highest winds: 160 mph (260 km/h)

Overall effects
- Fatalities: 2
- Injuries: 37
- Damage: $37 million

This destructive, long-tracked nighttime tornado first touched down in a populated area of Wolfe County, Kentucky at 6:50 PM, snapping trees at EF1 strength before quickly crossing into Magoffin County. Once in Magoffin County, the tornado began to widen and intensify as it continued along its path, snapping many trees and crossing the Mountain Parkway multiple times. Reaching high-end EF3 intensity and a path width of 3/4 of a mile wide, the tornado struck the town Salyersville, resulting in major damage. Numerous homes in Salyersville were destroyed, some of which were leveled. Mobile homes were completely destroyed, and vehicles were flipped and tossed. A McDonald's, a motel, an apartment complex, several gas stations, and three school buildings sustained major structural damage in town, along with many other structures and businesses. A church and an Advance Auto Parts store were almost completely destroyed as well. Despite the damage, no deaths occurred in Salyersville, though 30 people were injured.

Past Salyersville, the tornado maintained its strength and caused additional major damage in the rural community of Conley before crossing into Johnson County. High-end EF3 damage continued in Johnson County, and two fatalities occurred along this segment of the path as a mobile home was obliterated. Major damage occurred near Collista as the tornado crossed US 23 and KY 825. Multiple frame homes and manufactured homes were damaged or destroyed, vehicles were flipped, a metal truss tower was crumpled and destroyed, and entire hillsides and ridges were deforested by the tornado. One house was blown onto KY 825, blocking the road. The tornado then struck nearby Hager Hill, where several additional structures were destroyed. KY 321 and KY 1428 were both blocked by collapsed apartment buildings in Hager Hill, while semi-trailers were flipped, and industrial buildings were damaged as well in town. Past Hager Hill, the tornado weakened somewhat as it immediately struck the neighboring town of West Van Lear, tearing the roofs off of numerous homes and a church.

The tornado continued at high-end EF2 strength into Martin County, passing between Davella and Debord. Entire hillsides were deforested, a brick structure was destroyed, a one-story brick home lost its roof and some exterior walls, and a two-story home sustained damage to its second floor in this area. Additional hillsides suffered total deforestation in the Beauty community before the tornado struck the town of Lovely at the Kentucky/West Virginia state border. EF2 damage occurred in Lovely as trees were snapped and multiple homes had their roofs torn off.

The tornado then crossed into Mingo County, West Virginia just south of Kermit. Additional EF2 damage occurred as many trees were snapped and a 280-foot-high railroad communications tower was toppled to the ground before the tornado dissipated. Debris from Lovely was found deposited on mountaintops in the Kermit area. In addition to the two fatalities, 37 other people were injured by this tornado along its 49-mile long path.

=== East Bernstadt, Kentucky ===
East Bernstadt, Kentucky
- The tornado as seen from London, Kentucky.

Meteorological history
- Formed: March 2, 2012, 7:04 p.m. EST (UTC–05:00)
- Dissipated: March 2, 2012, 7:12 p.m. EST (UTC–05:00)
- Duration: 8 minutes

EF2 tornado
- on the Enhanced Fujita scale
- Highest winds: 125 mph (201 km/h)

Overall effects
- Fatalities: 6
- Injuries: 40
- Damage: $5 million (2012 USD)

This fatal, short-lived EF2 tornado officially made contact with the ground at 7:04 p.m. EST March 2, 2012 (0004 UTC March 3), approximately 5 miles to the west of East Bernstadt. Moving at a pace exceeding 50 MPH, the tornado collapsed and completely destroyed multiple outbuildings, denuded and felled trees, and destroyed multiple mobile homes west of Interstate 75. Moving northeastward, it then crossed the interstate and impacted East Bernstadt, Kentucky — more specifically Hare, an unincorporated hamlet in East Bernstadt. Here, extensive damage occurred, as frame homes were unroofed and partially collapsed (in some cases even swept), trees were uprooted and lofted, and multiple mobile and trailer homes were completely destroyed, with debris windrowed and only mounting blocks remaining at the sites of the mobile homes. Due to this damage (particularly the complete sweeping of mobile homes, with only undercarriages remaining, as well as the collapse and sweeping of frame homes), surveyors assigned a windspeed estimate of 125 MPH to the East Bernstadt tornado, which correlates to a high-end EF2 rating. Near one of the mobile home damage sites in East Bernstadt, an RV dealership and multiple metal-frame buildings were also severely impacted. In multiple areas, shredded insulation was found plastered against bare trees, metal and wood frames were strewn, and acres of trees were downed in the direction of the tornado's core.

Radar evolution of the storm system that produced the East Bernstadt tornado.

The tornado dissipated at 7:12 p.m. EST, south of Victory, Kentucky, having traveled a distance of 7.15 miles (11.51 km) in 8 minutes. Costs of damage from the tornado amounted to $5 million (2012 USD). 6 fatalities were reported, all of which were in mobile homes, and multiple individuals were displaced after their homes were destroyed by the tornado or were deemed beyond repair.

== Aftermath ==
Outbreak death toll
State/Province	Total	County	County total
Alabama	1	Tallapoosa	1
Indiana	13	Clark	1
Indiana	13	Jefferson	4
Indiana	13	Ripley	3
Indiana	13	Scott	1
Indiana	13	Washington	5
Kentucky	22	Johnson	2
Kentucky	22	Kenton	4
Kentucky	22	Laurel	6
Kentucky	22	Lawrence	2
Kentucky	22	Menifee	2
Kentucky	22	Morgan	6
Ohio	4	Adams	1
Ohio	4	Clermont	3
Totals	41		
Only tornado-related deaths are included

There was a final tornado-related death toll of 41 people—22 in Kentucky, 14 in Indiana, four in Ohio and one in Alabama. A total of 70 tornadoes were confirmed as a result of this outbreak.

=== Recovery efforts ===
On March 6, 2012, then President Barack Obama declared the Commonwealth of Kentucky to be eligible for federal aid. The Federal Emergency Management Agency (FEMA) granted federal aid under its Individual Assistance program to several counties that were impacted by the tornadoes four days earlier throughout Kentucky, including Menifee, Morgan, Lawrence and Johnson Counties. All counties in Kentucky that were affected were eligible to apply for assistance under the Hazard Mitigation Grant Program. In Lawrence County, Kentucky, 200 people were approved by FEMA for housing assistance. $300,000 (2012 USD) was used for debris clean-up and road repair efforts within the area.

In Henryville, Indiana, following the EF4 tornado that struck the town, property reconstruction company BELFOR was tasked with rebuilding the Henryville School campus, which was largely destroyed by the intense winds of the tornado. The company worked with school board members and local authorities to relocate students to temporary schooling facility while they worked on rebuilding the original school building. Two weeks after the tornado, elementary-level classes resumed at a temporary location; high school classes resumed three weeks after the tornado. The company conducted a controlled demolition of the building after taking out salvageable items and installed a security fence on the property to prevent looting in the demolished school. Henryville as a whole was rebuilt following the tornado. Indiana State Police worked to help people affected by the tornado in Henryville.

== See also ==
- Weather of 2012
- List of North American tornadoes and tornado outbreaks
- List of F4 and EF4 tornadoes
  - List of F4 and EF4 tornadoes (2010–2019)
- 2012 Leap Day tornado outbreak – An outbreak that occurred days prior over similar areas
- Tornado outbreak of March 2–3, 2020 – A much smaller outbreak that mainly affected Tennessee eight years later
  - 2020 Cookeville tornado – Another short lived, but catastrophic EF4 tornado in Tennessee.
- Tornado outbreak of December 10–11, 2021 – A deadly tornado outbreak that impacted western Kentucky almost ten years later.
  - 2021 Western Kentucky tornado – A long-track, catastrophic EF4 tornado that impacted portions of western Kentucky, becoming the first violent tornado in the state in almost ten years
- Tornado outbreak of May 15–16, 2025 – A deadly tornado event that impacted some of the same areas.
