= List of tornadoes in the outbreak of March 2–3, 2012 =

On March 2 and 3, 2012, a large and deadly tornado outbreak occurred over a large section of the Southern United States into the Ohio Valley region. The storms resulted in 41 tornado-related fatalities, 22 of which occurred in Kentucky. Tornado-related deaths also occurred in Alabama, Indiana, and Ohio.

== Confirmed tornadoes ==
Confirmed tornadoes by Enhanced Fujita rating
EFU	EF0	EF1	EF2	EF3	EF4	EF5	Total
0	27	18	14	9	2	0	70

=== March 2 event ===
List of reported tornadoes – Friday, March 2, 2012 (Note: All dates are based on the local time zone where the tornado touched down; however, all times are in Coordinated Universal Time and dates are split at midnight CDT for consistency.)
EF#	Location	County / Parish	State	Start Coord.	Time (UTC)	Path length	Max width	Summary
EF3	S of Athens to N of Meridianville to NE of New Market	Limestone, Madison	AL	34.7597°N 86.9531°W	15:10–16:00	33.99 mi (54.70 km)	250 yd (230 m)	See section on this tornado.
EF2	Meridianville to SW of New Market	Madison	AL	34.8502°N 86.5702°W	16:06–16:15	7.26 mi (11.68 km)	220 yd (200 m)	Homes were damaged to varying degrees by this high-end EF2 tornado, with a few poorly constructed homes destroyed. Silos, garages, and barns were damaged or destroyed, and many trees and power poles were snapped. Buckhorn High School was damaged, with vehicles moved and damaged in the parking lot and a cinder block structure on the property collapsed.
EF1	N of Francisco, AL	Jackson (AL), Franklin (TN)	AL, TN	34.985°N 86.2552°W	16:08–16:15	0.93 mi (1.50 km)	100 yd (91 m)	Trees were snapped and uprooted. This tornado came from the same supercell that produced the Athens EF3.
EF0	Northern New Baden	Clinton	IL	38.5528°N 89.6933°W	16:11–16:12	0.65 mi (1.05 km)	50 yd (46 m)	Weak tornado struck the north side of New Baden, causing minor roof damage to several homes in a subdivision and snapping off tree tops. Several fences were blown over as well.
EF1	N of Haletown (1st tornado)	Marion	TN	35.05°N 85.5416°W	17:15–17:16	0.5 mi (0.80 km)	100 yd (91 m)	Brief tornado snapped trees and tree limbs.
EF3	NW of Harrison to N of Cleveland to SE of Etowah	Hamilton, Bradley, Polk, McMinn	TN	35.128°N 85.1608°W	17:41–18:35	41 mi (66 km)	400 yd (370 m)	See section on this tornado – 44 people were injured, some severely.
EF0	S of Carmi	White	IL	38.0378°N 88.1708°W	18:28–18:31	2.6 mi (4.2 km)	100 yd (91 m)	A body shop was damaged, some tree damage was observed, and a metal carport was destroyed by this short-lived tornado.
EF2	S of Wadesville	Posey	IN	38.083°N 87.8494°W	18:37–18:43	6.07 mi (9.77 km)	140 yd (130 m)	One wood-frame home had its roof torn off and part of an exterior wall collapsed, while several other homes were damaged to varying degrees. A wooden beam was driven through the brick exterior wall of one home. Over 100 trees were snapped and uprooted and grain bins were destroyed. Oil tanks were blown over, and several sheds and garages were destroyed.
EF2	NW of Tellico Plains to Eastern Unicoi Mountains	Monroe	TN	38.083°N 87.8494°W	1847–19:03	14.31 mi (23.03 km)	400 yd (370 m)	This tornado moved directly through downtown Tellico Plains. About 30 homes, businesses, mobile homes, and other structures were damaged in town. A few of these structures were destroyed, including the police department and a telephone company building. The cabins, main lodge, and pavilion at a campground were leveled. Hundreds of trees were snapped or uprooted along the path as well, and three people were injured.
EF0	SE of Darmstadt	Vanderburgh	IN	38.0924°N 87.5707°W	19:00–19:03	2.05 mi (3.30 km)	50 yd (46 m)	Tornado remained over open country, causing no damage.
EF2	SE of Uniontown	Union	KY	37.7451°N 87.9085°W	19:38–19:44	6.56 mi (10.56 km)	200 yd (180 m)	A home had its roof torn off. A grain bin and several barns were destroyed or damaged, along with mainly minor damage to a few homes and other structures. Several trees and power poles were blown down. One person sustained minor injuries.
EF4	Southern Fredericksburg, IN to Henryville, IN to NNW of Bedford, KY	Washington (IN), Clark (IN), Scott (IN), Jefferson (IN), Trimble (KY)	IN, KY	38.4316°N 86.1893°W	19:50–20:39	46.61 mi (75.01 km)	800 yd (730 m)	11 deaths – See section on this tornado.
EF0	W of Elkmont	Limestone	AL	34.9155°N 87.0466°W	19:55–19:59	2.73 mi (4.39 km)	50 yd (46 m)	Weak tornado uprooted several trees and snapped tree limbs.
EF0	E of Rock Springs	Henderson	KY	37.7242°N 87.5804°W	19:55–19:59	3.84 mi (6.18 km)	100 yd (91 m)	A small shed was destroyed and several barns lost portions of their roofs. A house also lost a few shingles and several trees were downed.
EF0	Dixon	Webster	KY	37.5108°N 87.7068°W	20:06–20:08	0.76 mi (1.22 km)	50 yd (46 m)	A brief tornado downed tree limbs and a few signs in and around Dixon.
EF0	E of Owensboro	Daviess	KY	37.7615°N 87.0509°W	20:22	0.25 mi (400 m)	50 yd (46 m)	Brief tornado remained over open country, causing no damage.
EF1	Henryville	Clark	IN	38.5154°N 85.8758°W	20:30–20:36	6.57 mi (10.57 km)	60 yd (55 m)	This tornado was spawned by a second supercell that trailed behind the initial EF4 that struck town less than 30 minutes earlier. The tornado caused damage to trees and homes in Henryville and was accompanied by very large damaging hail.
EF2	SSW of Hawesville to SE of Stephensport	Hancock, Breckinridge	KY	37.8345°N 86.7814°W	20:38	16.49 mi (26.54 km)	200 yd (180 m)	Intermittent tornado struck two chicken farms with large chicken houses damaged and destroyed, and hundreds of chickens killed or lost. Several trees were downed, and outbuildings were damaged or destroyed. Several homes sustained minor to moderate damage as well. The circulation passed over the city of Cloverport as a funnel cloud, causing no damage there.
EF3	SSE of Milton	Trimble, Carroll	KY	38.6579°N 85.2632°W	20:41–20:48	5.66 mi (9.11 km)	75 yd (69 m)	A metal fire station building was destroyed, with a pumper tanker inside being damaged. A nearby two ton concession trailer was moved 30 yards, while a pickup truck was moved 60 yards. Several homes were damaged, one of which sustained collapse of exterior walls. Mobile homes were destroyed, and a metal truss tower was toppled to the ground. Outbuildings were damaged and destroyed, and extensive tree damage occurred.
EF0	Boonshill	Lincoln	TN	35.2116°N 86.7422°W	20:45–20:47	0.62 mi (1.00 km)	50 yd (46 m)	Weak tornado struck the rural community of Boonshill, causing shingle damage to the community center building, downing several trees, and destroying an old barn.
EF3	Holton to SE of Osgood	Ripley	IN	39.0667°N 85.407°W	20:52–21:02	8.69 mi (13.99 km)	350 yd (320 m)	3 deaths – This strong tornado caused major damage in Holton, where frame homes were heavily damaged or destroyed and mobile homes were obliterated. A cinder-block structure was leveled, vehicles were moved and damaged, outbuildings and large grain bins were destroyed, and many trees in town were snapped and denuded. Minor damage to farms occurred outside of town before the tornado dissipated. Two people died in Holton immediately after the tornado. A third fatality occurred when an injured person succumbed in January 2013. Five other people were injured.
EF1	SSE of Bedford	Trimble	KY	38.5374°N 85.2893°W	21:01–21:04	2.73 mi (4.39 km)	100 yd (91 m)	Numerous trees and power lines snapped and a 4-wheeler was moved 30 feet. Two barns and a mobile home were destroyed. Homes sustained roof and gutter damage as well.
EF0	SW of Guston	Meade	KY	37.88°N 86.24°W	2102	0.66 mi (1.06 km)	30 yd (27 m)	Brief tornado blew the porch off of a house and damaged a sign at a business.
EF1	WNW of Port Royal	Henry	KY	38.56°N 85.11°W	2112	0.25 mi (0.40 km)	40 yd (37 m)	Trees were twisted and downed along a narrow path.
EF4	Crittenden to S of Morning View	Grant, Kenton	KY	38.79°N 84.63°W	2123	9.85 mi (15.85 km)	880 yd (800 m)	4 deaths – See section on this tornado. 8 people were injured.
EF2	N of Owenton	Owen	KY	38.60°N 84.89°W	2124	5.4 mi (8.7 km)	150 yd (140 m)	A house sustained total removal of its roof and partial collapse of some exterior walls. Several barns were completely destroyed, and a semi-trailer was overturned. Several other homes and outbuildings sustained minor damage. Three people were injured.
EF0	N of Athens	Limestone	AL	34.86°N 87.01°W	2126	5 mi (8.0 km)	75 yd (69 m)	Weak tornado uprooted several trees and snapped tree limbs.
EF3	W of Peach Grove, KY to S of Hamersville, OH	Campbell (KY), Pendleton (KY), Clermont (OH), Brown (OH)	KY, OH	38.84°N 84.35°W	2139	20.4 mi (32.8 km)	440 yd (400 m)	3 deaths – See section on this tornado. 13 people were injured.
EF1	NE of Athens	Limestone	AL	34.92°N 86.86°W	2139	2.6 mi (4.2 km)	150 yd (140 m)	Homes sustained mostly minor siding and shingle damage, though one home sustained severe damage to its roof. A garage was damaged, and a well-built barn lost most of its roof. Many trees were snapped and uprooted as well.
EF1	S of Kingston Springs	Cheatham	TN	36.10°N 87.10°W	2148	1 mi (1.6 km)	100 yd (91 m)	A barn was destroyed, several houses sustained minor roof damage, and trees were snapped. Widespread downburst and hail damage occurred north of the tornado track across the remainder of Kingston Springs, where many buildings suffered considerable roof, window and siding damage.
EF1	N of Braggs to E of Hayneville	Lowndes	AL	32.09°N 86.78°W	2153	17.64 mi (28.39 km)	400 yd (370 m)	Many trees were snapped and uprooted and two homes sustained roof damage. Barns and outbuildings were damaged and destroyed, and pieces of farming equipment were tossed up to 100 yards away. Sheet metal was wrapped around trees and power lines were downed as well.
EF0	Berlin	Bracken	KY	38.69°N 84.17°W	2202	0.15 mi (240 m)	50 yd (46 m)	A garage was destroyed, a power pole was snapped, and there was heavy damage to a barn. Wooden 2x4s from the barn were speared deeply into the ground, and numerous trees were snapped by this brief tornado.
EF1	E of Alvaton	Warren	KY	36.87°N 86.31°W	2205	0.5 mi (0.80 km)	60 yd (55 m)	A tornado embedded within a larger area of straight line winds destroyed a barn and tool shed.
EF1	NNW of Seaman	Adams	OH	38.95°N 83.59°W	2225	2.95 mi (4.75 km)	400 yd (370 m)	Tornado destroyed several outbuildings and pole barns, tore part of the roof off of a home, and caused roof damage to another home. Numerous trees were snapped or uprooted.
EF0	SW of West Union	Adams	OH	38.78°N 83.57°W	2230	0.15 mi (0.24 km)	25 yd (23 m)	Brief tornado damaged a barn, with debris from the structure being driven into the ground. Many trees were snapped in a nearby grove as well.
EF2	NE of West Union	Adams	OH	38.81°N 83.52°W	2233	11.1 mi (17.9 km)	330 yd (300 m)	1 death – Five mobile homes were destroyed and two frame homes were damaged. Dozens of cattle were killed, and power transmission poles were knocked over. Many trees were snapped and uprooted along the path. Two people were injured.
EF3	SW of Mariba, KY to West Liberty to E of Ranger, WV	Menifee (KY), Morgan (KY), Johnson (KY), Lawrence (KY), Wayne (WV), Lincoln (WV)	KY, WV	37.91°N 83.61°W	2239	84.99 mi (136.78 km)	1,580 yd (1,440 m)	10 deaths – See article on this tornado. 118 people were injured.
EF0	Otway	Scioto	OH	38.85°N 83.21°W	2246	2.05 mi (3.30 km)	100 yd (91 m)	Tornado damaged two homes and a fire station were damaged in Otway. Numerous trees were snapped outside of town as well.
EF0	NE of Rarden	Scioto, Pike	OH	38.96°N 83.21°W	2246	4.15 mi (6.68 km)	200 yd (180 m)	A mobile home sustained significant damage and numerous trees were snapped and uprooted.
EF0	ENE of Dayton	Rhea	TN	35.49°N 85.01°W	2252	2.6 mi (4.2 km)	75 yd (69 m)	A shed was destroyed, four barns were damaged, and trees were downed.
EF0	SW of Piketon	Pike	OH	39.00°N 83.10°W	2253	2.8 mi (4.5 km)	100 yd (91 m)	Numerous trees were snapped and uprooted. One tree fell upon a mobile home, severely damaging it.
EF0	W of Brooklyn	Coffee	AL	31.31°N 86.19°W	2301	0.46 mi (740 m)	25 yd (23 m)	Brief tornado caused no damage.
EF1	SW of Owingsville to NW of Salt Lick	Bath	KY	38.14°N 83.78°W	2308	7.4 mi (11.9 km)	250 yd (230 m)	Numerous trees were snapped or uprooted and several barns and residences were damaged.
EF1	N of Haletown (2nd tornado)	Marion	TN	35.05°N 85.54°W	2310	0.2 mi (0.32 km)	100 yd (91 m)	Brief tornado snapped trees and tree limbs. This tornado north of Haletown struck very close to the first one.
EF2	N of Cookeville	Jackson, Putnam, Overton	TN	36.28°N 85.57°W	2326	12.3 mi (19.8 km)	800 yd (730 m)	This large wedge tornado damaged or destroyed many outbuildings, homes, and mobile homes along its path. Hundreds of trees and power lines were downed, and 20 people were injured.
EF3	W of Salyersville, KY to SE of Kermit, WV	Wolfe (KY), Magoffin (KY), Johnson (KY), Martin (KY), Mingo (WV)	KY, WV	37.70°N 83.27°W	2350	49.2 mi (79.2 km)	1,207 yd (1,104 m)	2 deaths – See section on this tornado. 37 people were injured.
EF0	SW of Jamestown	Fentress	TN	36.38°N 85.10°W	2356	6.42 mi (10.33 km)	300 yd (270 m)	Dozens of trees were downed across very mountainous terrain.
EF2	NW of East Bernstadt	Laurel	KY	37.20°N 84.21°W	0004	7.15 mi (11.51 km)	310 yd (280 m)	6 deaths – See article on this tornado. 40 people were injured.
EF0	NNE of Dundee	Geneva	AL	31.13°N 85.67°W	0017	0.1 mi (0.16 km)	30 yd (27 m)	Brief tornado touchdown in a peanut field caused no damage.
EF1	NE of Baxterville to NE of Purvis	Lamar, Forrest	MS	31.08°N 89.59°W	0023	12 mi (19 km)	300 yd (270 m)	This tornado impacted the northwestern fringes of Purvis, causing minor tree damage at that location. Elsewhere along the path, multiple mobile homes were blown off their foundations and heavily damaged, and a large storage shed also sustained major damage. Frame homes sustained roof and siding damage and many trees were snapped along the path, one of which fell onto a house.
EF1	SE of Midkiff to NE of Alkol	Lincoln	WV	38.15°N 82.16°W	0032	16 mi (26 km)	300 yd (270 m)	Trees and a few homes were damaged along the path.
EF2	Kildeer Mountain to E of Murphy	Cherokee	NC	35.27°N 82.65°W	0044	21.5 mi (34.6 km)	400 yd (370 m)	This tornado caused heavy damage in the northern part of Murphy, where a feed store and two rows of commercial storage units were destroyed. A shopping plaza and a paint store sustained heavy damage as well, and sheet metal was wrapped around trees. A total of 118 structures were damaged along the path, including five homes or mobile homes and five businesses that were destroyed. Many trees were snapped and uprooted as well.
EF3	NW of Buchanan to Dallas	Haralson, Paulding	GA	33.87°N 85.30°W	0109	29 mi (47 km)	200 yd (180 m)	Near Buchanan, this high-end EF3 tornado caused a home to collapse into its basement, injuring one person inside. A nearby repair shop was destroyed, and a church had its steeple blown off. Further along the path near Dallas, numerous homes were damaged or destroyed, a hangar at an airport was destroyed along with 19 planes inside, and a church had its roof ripped off. An elementary school sustained major roof damage and had an exterior wall blown out, with six nearby portable classrooms destroyed. An RV was overturned and a box truck was impaled by a wooden 2x4. Less intense damage occurred in Dallas before the tornado dissipated, though many trees in town were snapped and uprooted and some landed on homes. A total of 10 homes were destroyed, 58 were moderately damaged, and 92 others sustained minor damage in or near Dallas. Numerous trees and power lines were downed along the path.
EF2	Northern Harrogate	Claiborne	TN	36.58°N 83.64°W	0123	2.6 mi (4.2 km)	250 yd (230 m)	Several houses in the northern part of Harrogate sustained major roof damage and others lost their roofs entirely. Many trees were snapped and uprooted, fences were downed, and sheds were destroyed.
EF1	NW of Union, TN to SW of Ewing, VA	Claiborne (TN), Lee (VA)	TN, VA	36.63°N 83.43°W	0145	5 mi (8.0 km)	200 yd (180 m)	A few homes were heavily damaged or destroyed, with many others suffering minor damage. Numerous outbuildings were damaged or destroyed and trees were uprooted. Miles of agricultural fencing was destroyed and one person was injured.
EF0	Lake Glenville	Jackson	NC	35.18°N 83.19°W	0204	1.75 mi (2.82 km)	100 yd (91 m)	Numerous trees were snapped and uprooted, with one falling on a house. A church and a few homes had shingle damage as well.
EF1	SE of Jonesville	Lee	VA	36.66°N 83.08°W	0210	1 mi (1.6 km)	100 yd (91 m)	A mobile home was moved 15 feet (4.6 m) off of its foundation, a camper was rolled 40 yards (37 m), and several outbuildings were destroyed.
EF1	Eastern Marietta	Cobb	GA	33.97°N 84.45°W	0214	1 mi (1.6 km)	150 yd (140 m)	A daycare center and several homes had roof damage, and many trees were snapped or uprooted.
EF0	N of Farragut	Knox	TN	35.92°N 84.17°W	0233	0.31 mi (0.50 km)	70 yd (64 m)	Brief tornado downed a few trees.
EF0	S of Mascot	Knox	TN	36.02°N 83.77°W	0300	2.1 mi (3.4 km)	100 yd (91 m)	Tornado pushed a mobile home over onto its side and caused sporadic tree damage.
EF1	NE of Suttle to NE of Vine Hill	Perry, Dallas, Autauga	AL	32.54°N 87.15°W	0315	18.99 mi (30.56 km)	750 yd (690 m)	Tornado moved through sparsely populated areas, downing thousands of trees. Shingles and windows were damaged at the Paul M. Grist State Park park center building. Hunting camp trailers were destroyed, and a brick home sustained minor damage as well.
EF2	SW of Verbena to NE of Nixburg	Chilton, Coosa	AL	32.72°N 86.56°W	0401	28.58 mi (46.00 km)	700 yd (640 m)	This tornado passed just south of Verbena, damaging or destroying 13 homes and mobile homes, along with several outbuildings. Damage along the rest of the path was limited to snapped trees.
EF2	W of Wind Creek State Park to W of Five Points	Tallapoosa, Chambers	AL	32.87°N 85.97°W	0440	34.26 mi (55.14 km)	1,000 yd (910 m)	1 death – This large multiple-vortex tornado crossed Lake Martin near the beginning of its path before passing near Jackson's Gap, Eagle Creek, and Trammel Crossroads. Several homes sustained significant damage, and multiple mobile homes were completely destroyed. One mobile home frame was wrapped completely around a tree trunk. Thousands of trees were snapped and uprooted along the path, and two other people were injured.
EF0	NNE of Carson	Jefferson Davis	MS	31.59°N 89.76°W	0547	0.25 mi (0.40 km)	50 yd (46 m)	A mobile home's porch was destroyed, and another mobile home was knocked off its piers. A few trees were snapped and uprooted.

=== March 3 event ===
List of confirmed tornadoes – Saturday, March 3, 2012
EF#	Location	County / Parish	State	Start Coord.	Time (UTC)	Path length	Max width	Summary
EF2	Charlotte to Harrisburg	Mecklenburg, Cabarrus	NC	35.257°N 80.687°W	07:35–7:39	2.94 mi (4.73 km)	200 yd (180 m)	Nearly 200 homes were damaged in residential areas of Charlotte and Harrisburg as a result of this strong early morning tornado, including a few frail homes that slid off of their foundations and collapsed. Vehicles were flipped, trees were downed, and sheds were destroyed as well. Four people were injured, including a child who was thrown from his home across Interstate 485.
EF0	Northern Columbia	Richland	SC	34.072°N 81.076°W	10:35–10:38	2.54 mi (4.09 km)	80 yd (73 m)	Weak tornado downed trees and tree branches, some of which landed on a mobile home.
EF0	ENE of Colquitt	Miller	GA	31.1964°N 84.683°W	12:15–12:17	0.3 mi (0.48 km)	25 yd (23 m)	Several trees were snapped and a home suffered roof damage and had its front porch torn off.
EF0	SSW of Vada	Decatur	GA	31.05°N 84.43°W	13:30–13:35	3.27 mi (5.26 km)	25 yd (23 m)	Tornado destroyed a home's attached garage, a camper, and multiple sheds. A car and irrigation pivots were also overturned.
EF0	S of Quincy	Gadsden	FL	30.4738°N 84.6159°W	14:25–14:26	0.55 mi (0.89 km)	25 yd (23 m)	About two dozen trees were downed in a rural area.
EF3	NW of Moody Air Force Base to Lakeland	Lowndes, Lanier	GA	31.008°N 83.2517°W	17:56–18:10	10.45 mi (16.82 km)	390 yd (360 m)	Near Moody Air Force Base, this wedge tornado caused EF2 damage as frame homes were damaged and pushed off of their foundations, a mobile home was destroyed with debris scattered downwind, a tree was ripped out of the ground by its roots and thrown, and a silo was destroyed. Other homes in this area sustained minor damage, while a shed was destroyed and a camper was flipped as well. Further along the path, EF3 damage occurred as trees sustained almost complete debarking, ground scouring and deep gouging marks were noted, shrubbery and an electric meter was ripped out of the ground, a mobile home was totally obliterated to its site being unrecognizable, a mower and a propane tank were thrown for hundreds of yards, and a large shed structure was swept away. Projectiles were driven deeply into the ground along this segment of the path, a small grain silo was destroyed, a house at the edge of the damage path had roof and window damage, and a wooden 2x4 was speared into a metal trailer. The tornado weakened and struck Lakeland before dissipating, where another mobile home was destroyed, a full shipping container was rolled 50 ft (15 m), a hospital sustained damage to its rooftop antennas and air conditioning units. The hospital's ambulance station was also damaged, and a nearby trailer was moved. Many trees and power poles were snapped along the path.
