= Terryville, Kentucky =

- Unincorporated community
- Location within Kentucky Location within the United States
- Coordinates: 37°59′23″N 82°59′15″W
- Country: United States
- State: Kentucky
- List of counties in Kentucky: Lawrence County
- Elevation: 774 ft (236 m)
- Time zone: UTC-6 (Central (CST))
  - Summer (DST): UTC-5 (CDT)

Terryville, Kentucky is a populated place in Lawrence County, Kentucky. Historically it was the site of a post office and a school.
