= Crittenden, Kentucky =

- City
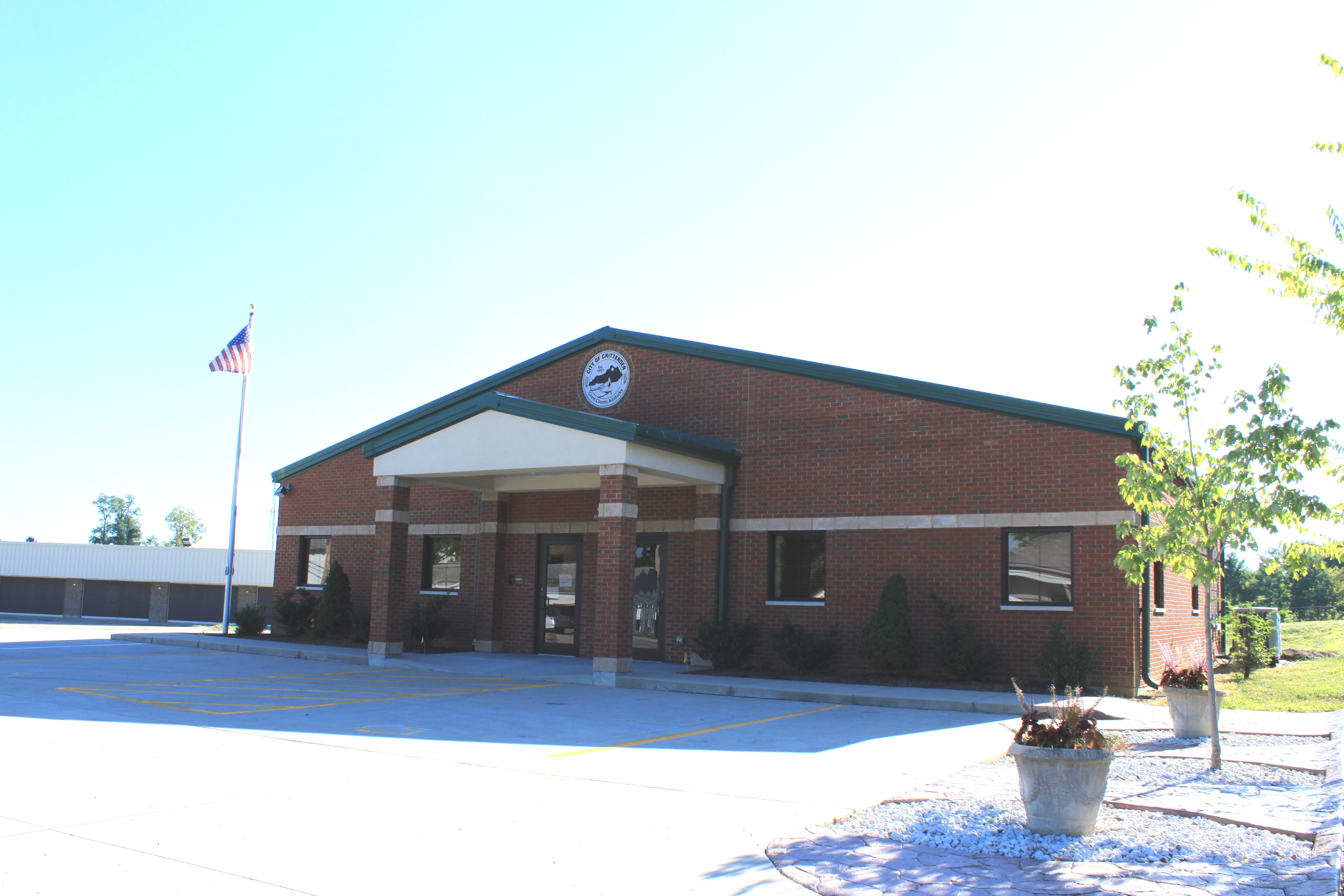
- Crittenden City Hall

- Location of Crittenden in Grant and Kenton counties.
- Coordinates: 38°45′34″N 84°37′18″W
- Country: United States
- State: Kentucky
- County: Grant, Kenton

Area
  - Total: 3.43 sq mi (8.89 km^{2})
  - Land: 3.41 sq mi (8.82 km^{2})
  - Water: 0.027 sq mi (0.07 km^{2})
- Elevation: 925 ft (282 m)

Population (2020)
  - Total: 4,023
  - Estimate (2024): 4,125
  - Density: 1,181.5/sq mi (456.18/km^{2})
- Time zone: UTC-5 (Eastern (EST))
  - Summer (DST): UTC-4 (EDT)
- ZIP code: 41030
- Area code: 859
- FIPS code: 21-18568
- GNIS feature ID: 2404156
- Website: cityofcrittendenky.gov

Crittenden is a home rule-class city in Grant and Kenton counties, Kentucky, in the United States. The population was 4,023 as of the 2020 Census, up from 3,815 as of the 2010 census, which was further up from 2,401 at the 2000 census.

== Geography ==
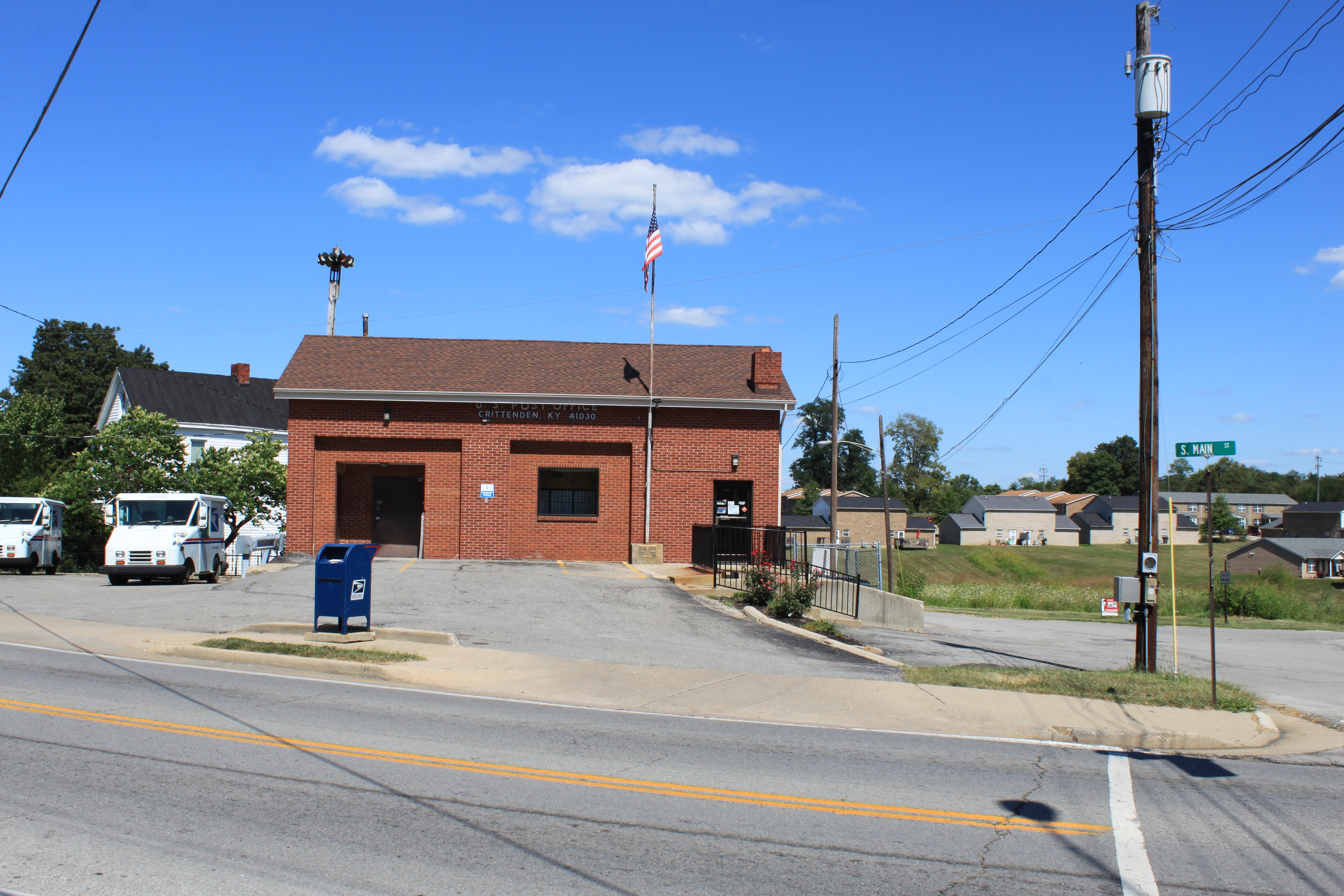
Crittenden US Post Office

Crittenden is located in northern Grant County. A small portion of the northern border of the city touches the Boone County line, and another part of the city extends north into Kenton County.

Interstate 75 passes through Crittenden, with access from Exit 166; I-75 leads north 27 miles (43 km) to Cincinnati and south 56 miles (90 km) to Lexington. U.S. Route 25 (Dixie Highway) is a local road running parallel to I-75 that passes through the center of Crittenden; US 25 leads north 7 miles (11 km) to Walton and south 11 miles (18 km) to Williamstown, the Grant County seat.

According to the United States Census Bureau, Crittenden has a total area of 3.4 square miles (8.9 km^{2}), of which 0.03 square miles (0.07 km^{2}), or 0.80%, is water.

== History ==
The area of what is now Crittenden may have been settled as early as 1812. The community was called "Pin Hook" until 1834, when it was renamed for Kentucky statesman and later governor John J. Crittenden.

=== 2012 tornado ===
Durng the evening of March 2, 2012, a short-lived yet deadly tornado struck the Cincinnati, Ohio metro area, causing devastating damage across the communities of Crittenden, Piner, and Morning View, in the U.S. state of Kentucky. The Crittenden tornado originated from a parent supercell that had dropped a fatal and long-tracked EF4 tornado only hours earlier that struck parts of southern Indiana, especially the city of Henryville.

== Demographics ==
Historical population
Census	Pop.	Note	%±
1850	250		—
1860	290		16.0%
1870	295		1.7%
1880	323		9.5%
1890	440		36.2%
1900	199		−54.8%
1910	189		−5.0%
1920	185		−2.1%
1930	265		43.2%
1940	232		−12.5%
1950	287		23.7%
1960	287		0.0%
1970	359		25.1%
1980	597		66.3%
1990	731		22.4%
2000	2,401		228.5%
2010	3,815		58.9%
2020	4,023		5.5%
2024 (est.)	4,125		2.5%
U.S. Decennial Census

=== 2020 census ===
As of the 2020 census, Crittenden had a population of 4,023. The median age was 31.9 years. 29.3% of residents were under the age of 18 and 10.7% of residents were 65 years of age or older. For every 100 females there were 93.6 males, and for every 100 females age 18 and over there were 93.7 males age 18 and over.

0.0% of residents lived in urban areas, while 100.0% lived in rural areas.

There were 1,428 households in Crittenden, of which 44.7% had children under the age of 18 living in them. Of all households, 43.5% were married-couple households, 17.7% were households with a male householder and no spouse or partner present, and 26.3% were households with a female householder and no spouse or partner present. About 19.7% of all households were made up of individuals and 6.9% had someone living alone who was 65 years of age or older.

There were 1,482 housing units, of which 3.6% were vacant. The homeowner vacancy rate was 0.4% and the rental vacancy rate was 3.1%.

Racial composition as of the 2020 census
Race	Number	Percent
White	3,604	89.6%
Black or African American	62	1.5%
American Indian and Alaska Native	14	0.3%
Asian	18	0.4%
Native Hawaiian and Other Pacific Islander	7	0.2%
Some other race	73	1.8%
Two or more races	245	6.1%
Hispanic or Latino (of any race)	179	4.4%

=== 2000 census ===
As of the 2000 census, there were 2,401 people, 870 households, and 634 families residing in the city. The population density was 1,055.8 inhabitants per square mile (407.6/km^{2}). There were 990 housing units at an average density of 435.3 per square mile (168.1/km^{2}). The racial makeup of the city was 98.21% White, 0.42% African American, 0.25% Native American, 0.17% Asian, 0.08% Pacific Islander, 0.33% from other races, and 0.54% from two or more races. Hispanic or Latino of any race were 1.25% of the population.

There were 870 households, out of which 46.7% had children under the age of 18 living with them, 55.5% were married couples living together, 12.4% had a female householder with no husband present, and 27.1% were non-families. 19.7% of all households were made up of individuals, and 3.8% had someone living alone who was 65 years of age or older. The average household size was 2.76 and the average family size was 3.19.

In the city, the population was spread out, with 32.5% under the age of 18, 12.0% from 18 to 24, 36.1% from 25 to 44, 15.0% from 45 to 64, and 4.4% who were 65 years of age or older. The median age was 28 years. For every 100 females, there were 95.5 males. For every 100 females age 18 and over, there were 91.4 males.

The median income for a household in the city was $40,944, and the median income for a family was $44,038. Males had a median income of $31,399 versus $24,556 for females. The per capita income for the city was $16,573. About 6.2% of families and 8.4% of the population were below the poverty line, including 10.1% of those under age 18 and 6.0% of those age 65 or over.
