= Piner, Kentucky =

Unincorporated community in Kentucky, United States

- Unincorporated community
- Location within Kentucky Location within the United States
- Coordinates: 38°49′53″N 84°32′9″W
- Country: United States
- State: Kentucky
- County: Kenton
- Elevation: 276 ft (84 m)
- Time zone: UTC-5 (Eastern (EST))
  - Summer (DST): UTC-4 (EDT)
- Area code: 859
- GNIS feature ID: 500724

Piner is an unincorporated community in Kenton County, Kentucky, United States. The community is located at the intersection of Kentucky Route 14 and Kentucky Route 17 in the southern portion of the county. Piner has an elementary school, Piner Elementary School, which is part of the Kenton County School District.

On March 2, 2012, Piner was hit by an EF4 tornado, which killed four people and injured eight others; the tornado was part of a larger outbreak in the Ohio River valley.
