= Fiskburg, Kentucky =

Unincorporated community in Kentucky, United States

Coordinates: 38°48′38″N 84°30′25″W

Fiskburg is an unincorporated community in Kenton County, in the U.S. state of Kentucky.

== History ==
A post office called Fiskburgh was established in 1834, the name was changed to Fiskburg in 1894, and the post office closed in 1903. The community most likely has the name of the local Fisk family.
