= Morning View, Kentucky =

Unincorporated community in the United States

- Unincorporated community
- Location within Kentucky Location within the United States
- Coordinates: 38°49′55″N 84°27′23″W
- Country: United States
- State: Kentucky
- County: Kenton
- Elevation: 541 ft (165 m)
- Time zone: UTC-5 (Eastern (EST))
  - Summer (DST): UTC-4 (EDT)
- ZIP code: 41063
- Area code: 859
- GNIS feature ID: 498605

Morning View is an unincorporated community in Kenton County, Kentucky, United States. The community is located along the Licking River at the intersection of Kentucky Route 14 and Kentucky Route 177, 9 miles (14 km) south-southeast of Independence. Morning View has a post office with ZIP code 41063.
