= Kenton County School District =

School district in Kenton County, Kentucky, United States

The Kenton County School District

Location
- 1055 Eaton Dr., Ft. Wright, Kentucky 41017 Kenton County

District information
- Motto: "It's about ALL Kids."
- Established: 1884
- Superintendent: Dr. Henry Webb
- Accreditations: Southern Association of Colleges and Schools
- Schools: 18
- Budget: $7.1 million
- NCES District ID: 2103090

Students and staff
- Students: 14,421
- Teachers: 790+
- Student–teacher ratio: 18.07

Other information
- Website: www.kenton.kyschools.us

The Kenton County School District (the definite article is part of the district's official name) is a local education agency headquartered in Ft. Wright, Kentucky and is the public school system for Kenton County outside of the areas within Independent School Districts.

== History ==
=== Education Prior to establishment ===
Kenton County was created in 1840 as Kentucky's 90th county. It was named after pioneer, Simon Kenton. The first free public school in Kenton County was in Covington was established in 1820. A second cabin school was open up in 1836 on Gerard Street.

In 1921, the district bought its first school bus.

== Schools ==
The district operates 18 schools: 11 elementary schools, 4 middle schools, and 3 high schools. The district is responsible for 14,000+ student or approximately 36% of the under age 18 population in the county. However, large portions of the county's population lives in one of the county's four independent school districts:

- The largest city in the Northern Kentucky region, Covington's, northern urban core is served by Covington Independent Public Schools (along with a small parcel of Ludlow and Fort Wright) but its southern suburban neighborhoods are assigned to Kenton County District schools.
- The cities of Erlanger and Elsmere are served by Erlanger-Elsmere Schools, except portions of Erlanger City Limits that lie East of Turkey Foot Road and small sections of Elsmere. Additionally a section of Edgewood is in this district.
- Almost all of the city of Fort Mitchell, and a portion of Fort Wright, are served by the Beechwood Independent School District.
- The city of Ludlow and most of Bromley are served by the Ludlow Independent Schools.

=== High schools ===
School	City	Mascot	Enrollment
Dixie Heights	Edgewood	Colonels	1,499
Scott	Taylor Mill	Eagles	1,017
Simon Kenton	Independence	Pioneers	1,893

=== Middle schools ===
School	City	Mascot	Enrollment
Summit View	Independence	Royals	1,324
Turkey Foot	Edgewood	Indians	1,006
Twenhofel	Independence	Thoroughbreds	775
Woodland	Taylor Mill	Wildcats	542

=== Elementary schools ===
School	City	Mascot	Enrollment
Beechgrove	Independence	Bears	645
J.A. Caywood	Edgewood	Corporals	582
Fort Wright	Fort Wright	Falcons	435
R.C. Hinsdale	Edgewood	Patriots	555
Kenton	Independence	Wildcats	650
Piner	Morning View	Panthers	354
River Ridge	Villa Hills	Timberwolves	889
Ryland	Ryland Heights	Tigers	443
Summit View	Independence	Royals	688
Taylor Mill	Covington	Tigers	508
White's Tower	Independence	Bearcats	675
