= Holmes Junior/Senior High School =

High school in Kentucky, United States

Coordinates: 39°3′40″N 84°30′6″W

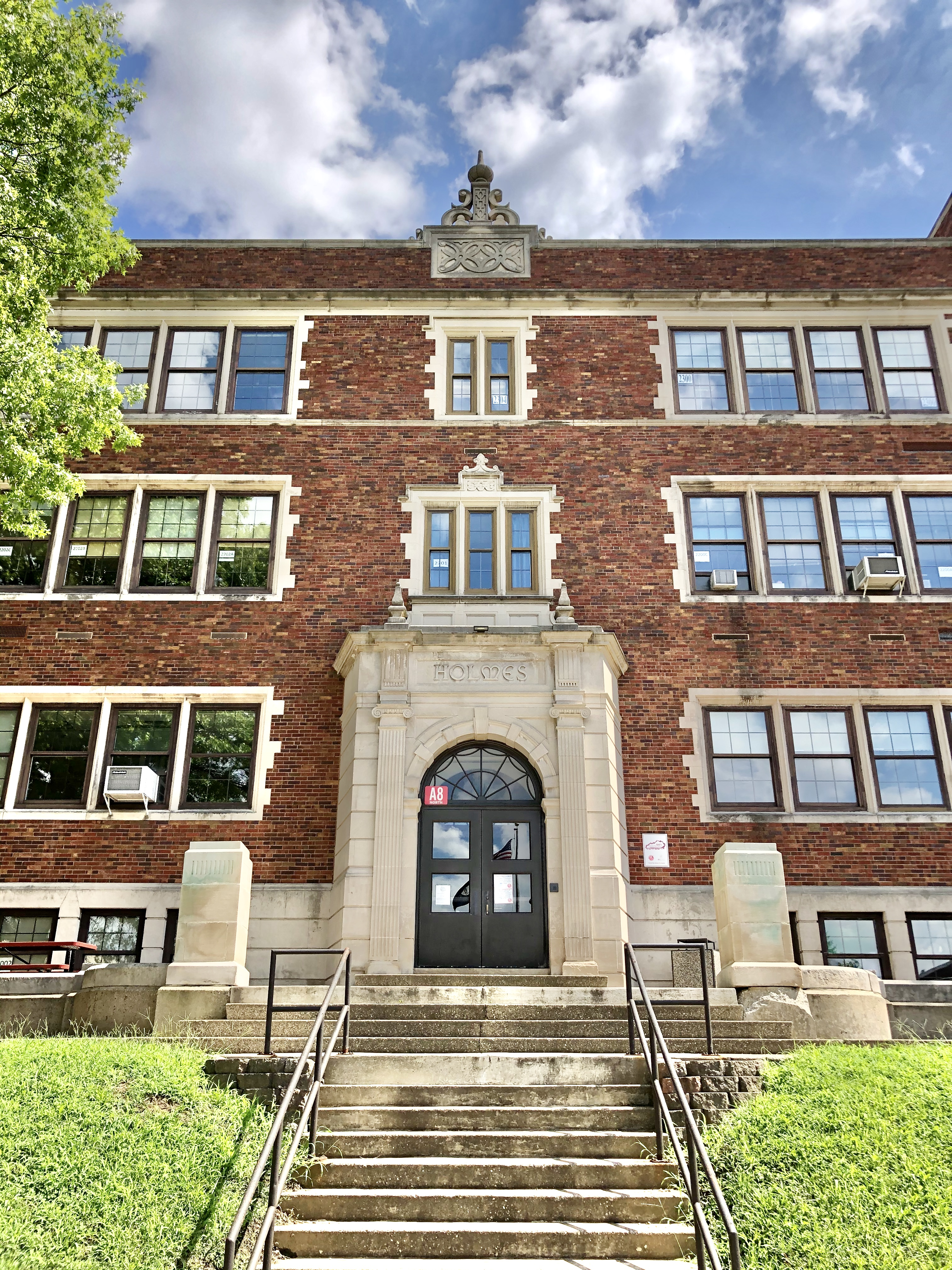
- 2500 Madison Ave SUITE 1, Covington, KY 41014; United States

Information
- Type: Public School
- Established: 1853
- School district: Covington Independent Public Schools
- Principal: Ben Brown
- Teaching staff: 60.62 (FTE)
- Grades: 9 to 12
- Enrollment: 898 (2023–2024)
- Student to teacher ratio: 14.81
- Colors: Red and Grey
- Mascot: Bulldogs
- Feeder schools: Holmes Middle School
- Website: https://hhs.covington.kyschools.us/o/hhs

Covington Holmes Junior/Senior High School, located in Covington, Kentucky, United States, is the oldest public high school in Kentucky, founded as Covington Central High in 1853. It is part of the Covington Independent Public Schools. Its boundary includes much of Covington (to the north) and portions of Kenton Vale and Fort Wright.

== History ==
The original school started with 22 students. In 1919 the school moved to the mansion Holmesdale, built by Daniel Henry Holmes, who owned retail stores in Covington and New Orleans. Holmesdale was a 32-room mansion built on about 17 acres (69,000 m^{2}). It was sold in 1919 by the Holmes family to the Covington Board of Education for $50,000. The site is now part of the Holmes High School campus. Holmesdale was used for a school cafeteria for a time, but was torn down in 1936 to make way for an administration building.

Holmes is currently seven-year school, educating students from grades 6 through 12. The new name of the middle school is Holmes Middle School. The two schools act as separate entities on the same campus.

The school offers a wide range of programs, including the International Baccalaureate program, the Advanced Placement program, and, until recently, technical and vocational courses. Its distinguished graduates include the mathematician Carl Faith, nuclear scientist Dick Lewis, Staples CEO Ron Sargent, Major League Baseball umpire Randy Marsh.

In 2009, the Holmes Bulldogs basketball team (boys) won its first state title.

== History of the Middle School ==
A prior iteration of the school district saw Two Rivers Middle School (525 Scott St.) centrally educating Covington's 6th and 7th grade students from the mid-2000s to the mid-2010s. Prior to that, Holmes Junior High School centrally educated Covington's 7th and 8th grade students in the same buildings as today's Holmes Middle School, with 9th-12th grades operated next door as Holmes Senior High School.
