= Fort Wright, Kentucky =

- City
- Flag Seal

- Location in Kenton County, Kentucky
- Coordinates: 39°02′46″N 84°32′10″W
- Country: United States
- State: Kentucky
- County: Kenton
- Incorporated: 1941
- Named for: Horatio Wright

Government
  - Mayor: Dave Hatter

Area
  - Total: 3.44 sq mi (8.90 km^{2})
  - Land: 3.40 sq mi (8.80 km^{2})
  - Water: 0.039 sq mi (0.10 km^{2})
- Elevation: 801 ft (244 m)

Population (2020)
  - Total: 5,851
  - Estimate (2024): 6,096
  - Density: 1,721.2/sq mi (664.54/km^{2})
- Time zone: UTC-5 (Eastern (EST))
  - Summer (DST): UTC-4 (EDT)
- ZIP codes: 41011, 41017
- Area code: 859
- FIPS code: 21-28612
- GNIS feature ID: 2403651
- Website: fortwrightky.gov

Fort Wright is a home rule-class city in Kenton County, Kentucky, in the United States. The population was 5,851 at the 2020 census. It is a suburb of the Cincinnati metropolitan area.

== Geography ==
Fort Wright is located in northern Kenton County. It is bordered to the north by Ludlow, to the northeast by Park Hills, to the east by Kenton Vale, to the east and southeast by Covington, to the southwest by Edgewood and Crestview Hills, and to the west by Fort Mitchell.

According to the United States Census Bureau, Fort Wright has a total area of 3.4 square miles (8.7 km^{2}), of which 0.04 square miles (0.1 km^{2}), or 1.10%, are water.

== History ==
The area that is now Fort Wright was the site of one of the Civil War fortifications built for the Defense of Cincinnati. The city, incorporated in 1941, was named for Major General Horatio Gouverneur Wright, a Union Army engineer.

It annexed the neighboring communities of Lookout Heights in 1937, South Hills in 1949 and Lakeview in 1960.

== Demographics ==
Historical population
Census	Pop.	Note	%±
1950	594		—
1960	2,184		267.7%
1970	4,819		120.7%
1980	4,481		−7.0%
1990	6,570		46.6%
2000	5,681		−13.5%
2010	5,723		0.7%
2020	5,851		2.2%
2024 (est.)	6,096		4.2%
U.S. Decennial Census

=== 2020 census ===
As of the 2020 census, Fort Wright had a population of 5,851. The median age was 42.0 years. 18.0% of residents were under the age of 18 and 20.4% of residents were 65 years of age or older. For every 100 females there were 96.5 males, and for every 100 females age 18 and over there were 94.1 males age 18 and over.

100.0% of residents lived in urban areas, while 0.0% lived in rural areas.

There were 2,622 households in Fort Wright, of which 23.0% had children under the age of 18 living in them. Of all households, 47.4% were married-couple households, 19.8% were households with a male householder and no spouse or partner present, and 26.4% were households with a female householder and no spouse or partner present. About 33.5% of all households were made up of individuals and 11.9% had someone living alone who was 65 years of age or older.

There were 2,730 housing units, of which 4.0% were vacant. The homeowner vacancy rate was 1.1% and the rental vacancy rate was 5.3%.

Racial composition as of the 2020 census
Race	Number	Percent
White	5,297	90.5%
Black or African American	134	2.3%
American Indian and Alaska Native	5	0.1%
Asian	75	1.3%
Native Hawaiian and Other Pacific Islander	2	0.0%
Some other race	59	1.0%
Two or more races	279	4.8%
Hispanic or Latino (of any race)	159	2.7%

=== 2000 census ===
At the 2000 census, there were 5,681 people, 2,430 households and 1,569 families residing in the city. The population density was 1,642.1 inhabitants per square mile (634.0/km^{2}). There were 2,573 housing units at an average density of 743.7 per square mile (287.1/km^{2}). The racial makeup of the city was 97.32% White, 0.99% African American, 0.05% Native American, 0.79% Asian, 0.02% Pacific Islander, 0.21% from other races, and 0.62% from two or more races. Hispanic or Latino of any race were 0.69% of the population.

There were 2,430 households, of which 25.9% had children under the age of 18 living with them, 52.8% were married couples living together, 8.7% had a female householder with no husband present, and 35.4% were non-families. 30.9% of all households were made up of individuals, and 10.5% had someone living alone who was 65 years of age or older. The average household size was 2.34 and the average family size was 2.97.

21.5% were under the age of 18, 7.5% from 18 to 24, 30.9% from 25 to 44, 24.6% from 45 to 64, and 15.5% who were 65 years of age or older. The median age was 39 years. For every 100 females, there were 94.4 males. For every 100 females age 18 and over, there were 89.8 males.

The median household income was $52,394, and the median family income was $62,464. Males had a median income of $46,736 versus $35,220 for females. The per capita income for the city was $27,448. About 3.9% of families and 3.9% of the population were below the poverty line, including 6.1% of those under age 18 and 2.6% of those age 65 or over.

== Education ==
=== Public schools ===
Most of Fort Wright is in the Kenton County School District, with it also being headquartered in the city. Portions are in the Beechwood Independent School District and the Covington Independent Public Schools

=== Private schools ===
Private schools in Fort Wright are run by The Diocese of Covington. Saint Agnes Elementary is located in the city, and there are two high schools, Covington Catholic and Notre Dame, located in the neighboring community of Park Hills, Kentucky, which also serve Fort Wright.

== Government ==
Fort Wright is a home rule-class city. The city's mayor is elected every four years: the current mayor is Dave Hatter. The city also has a six-member City Council that is elected every two years. Current City council members are:

- Scott Wall
- Bernie Wessels
- Margie Witt
- Justin Weber
- Jason Collins
- Donna Ross

Fort Wright is represented in the Kentucky General Assembly by Senator Christian McDaniel (R) of the 23rd District in the Senate and by Representative Stephanie Dietz (R) of the 65th District in the House of Representatives.

Fort Wright is located in Kentucky's 4th Congressional District, currently represented in the 119th United States Congress by Thomas Massie (R).

== Infrastructure ==
=== Transportation ===
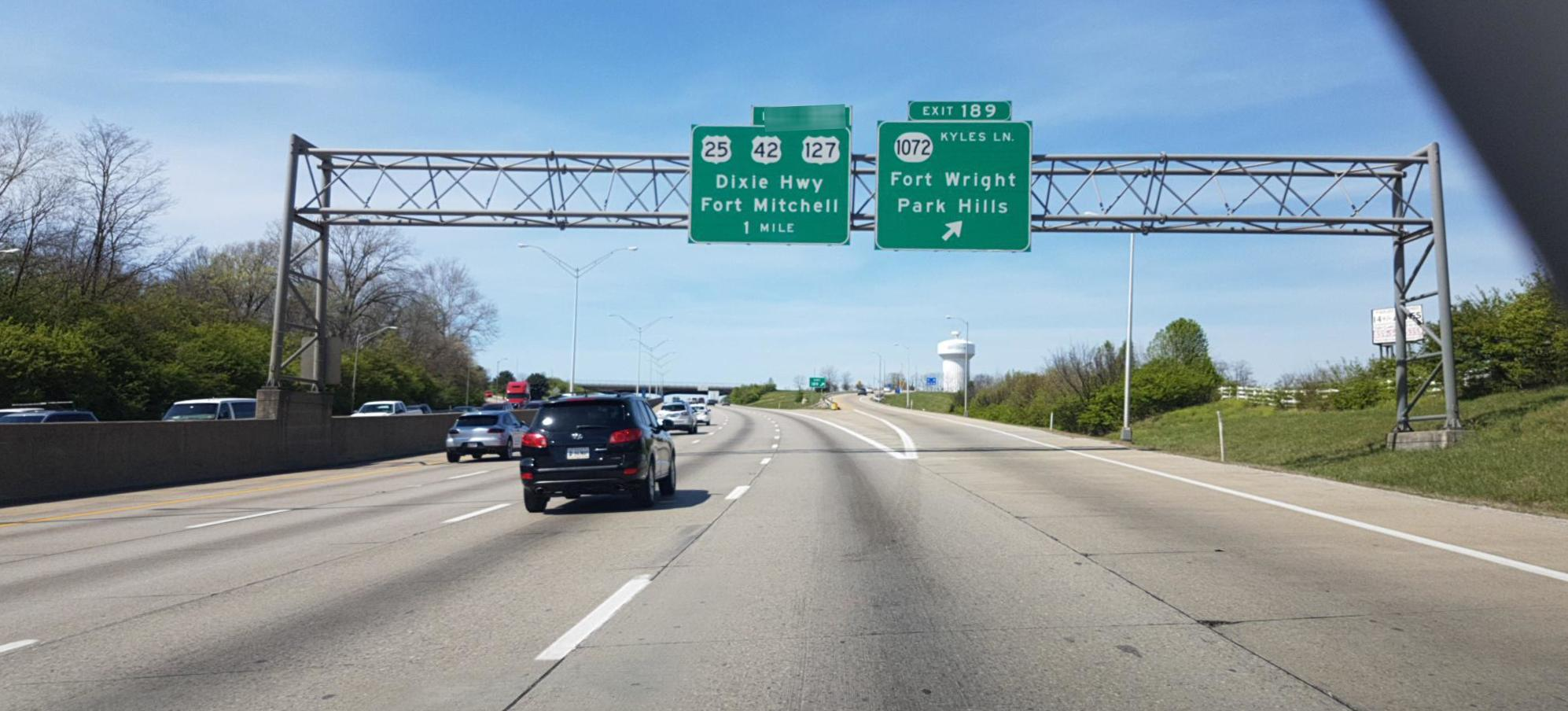
Interstate 71/75 Kyles Lane Exit

Interstate 75/71 crosses the center of the city, with access from Exit 189 (Kyles Lane). The freeway leads northeast 4 miles (6 km) to downtown Cincinnati in Ohio and southwest 16 miles (26 km) to its split at Walton.

Fort Wright is served by the Transit Authority of Northern Kentucky. TANK's headquarters is located in the city, with it also serving as a transit hub.

Fort Wright is also located 9.6 miles (15.4 km) away from the Cincinnati/Northern Kentucky International Airport.

=== Safety ===
Fort Wright maintains its own fire/EMS department. The department is equipped with two fire engines, and two ambulances. The city also has its own police department, staffed with 13 officers. The department is accredited through the Kentucky Association of Chiefs of Police. The department also provides a number of services, including numerous safety classes, a safe internet shopping zone, and a Prescription Drug Disposal program.
