= Bernart T. Wisenall =

American architect

Bernard T. Wisenall (September 4, 1869 - July 16, 1942) was a leading architect in Northern Kentucky. He worked with Louis G. Dittoe from 1895 to 1909 and on his own from 1910 to 1940.

Dittoe & Wisenall designed the former Covington City Hall, "a Richardsonian-Chateauesque building at the south end of the Suspension Bridge", First Christian Church, 14 W. Fifth Street in Covington (1893–1894), and the Pugh Power (now [W.H.] Polk) Building in Cincinnati on SEC Pike and Fifth streets. Pugh Power was "said to have been the largest reinforced concrete structure in the world at the time of its construction in 1904–1905" and was enlarged in 1906 during the original construction effort "owing to its initial success" and again in 1909. Wisenall partnered with Chester Disque for later works including the John G. Carlisle School and the former Fifth District School in Covington, "both were handsome simplified Art Deco/Moderne designs with broad horizontal stripes in buff and brown brick, and both have recently been altered beyond recognition." Wisenall lived in the historic Hathaway House in West Covington during his later years "which may have influenced some of his own Colonial Revival work".

== Projects ==
- Park Place at Lytle (formerly R.L. Polk & Company and also the Pugh Building) (1905) an 8-story building by Dittoe & Wisenall at 400-410 Pike Street converted to residential condos 2004–2006
- Covington City Hall designed by Dittoe & Wisenall, a Richardsonian-Chateauesque building
- First Christian Church (1893–1894), 14 W. Fifth St., Covington survives in a somewhat altered state
- John G. Carlisle School with Chester Disque in Covington (altered)
- Fifth District School (former) Covington (altered)
