= Mark Pike =

American football player (1963–2021)

No. 57, 94
- Positions: Linebacker, defensive end, special teamer

Personal information
- Born: December 27, 1963; Elizabethtown, Kentucky, U.S.
- Died: December 8, 2021 (aged 57)
- Listed height: 6 ft 4 in (1.93 m)
- Listed weight: 272 lb (123 kg)

Career information
- High school: Dixie Heights (Edgewood, Kentucky)
- College: Georgia Tech
- NFL draft: 1986: 7th round, 178th overall pick

Career history
- Buffalo Bills (1986–1998)

Career NFL statistics
- Tackles: 41
- Fumble recoveries: 1
- Sacks: 1
- Stats at Pro Football Reference

Mark Harold Pike (December 27, 1963 – December 8, 2021) was an American professional football player who was a linebacker, defensive end, and special teamer for twelve seasons in the National Football League (NFL) with the Buffalo Bills. He was originally selected 178th overall in the seventh round of the 1986 NFL Draft by the Bills. He played in four Super Bowls.

== Biography ==
Pike was a graduate of Dixie Heights High School in Erlanger, Kentucky.

He died on December 8, 2021, at age 57, from non-Hodgkin lymphoma complicated by COVID-19 pneumonia.
