= Dixie Heights High School =

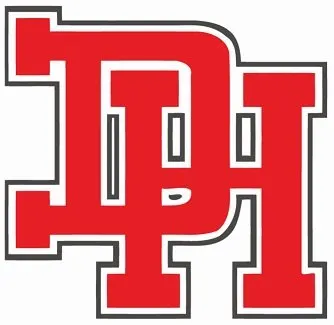
- Dixie Heights logo
- 3010 Dixie Highway, Fort Mitchell, KY 41017; United States

Information
- Type: Public School
- Established: 1936
- School district: Kenton County
- Superintendent: Dr. Henry Webb
- Principal: Roddy Stainforth
- Teaching staff: 69.00 (FTE)
- Grades: 9 to 12
- Enrollment: 1,524 (2023–2024)
- Student to teacher ratio: 22.09
- Colors: Red and Grey
- Mascot: Colonels
- Website: https://dixieheights.kenton.kyschools.us/

Dixie Heights High School, usually referred to as just Dixie, is a 6-A high school located at 3010 Dixie Highway in Edgewood, Kentucky, United States, but has a mailing address of Fort Mitchell. Dixie Heights High School is in the Kenton County School District. The superintendent is Dr. Henry Webb. The principal is Roddy Stainforth.

== History ==
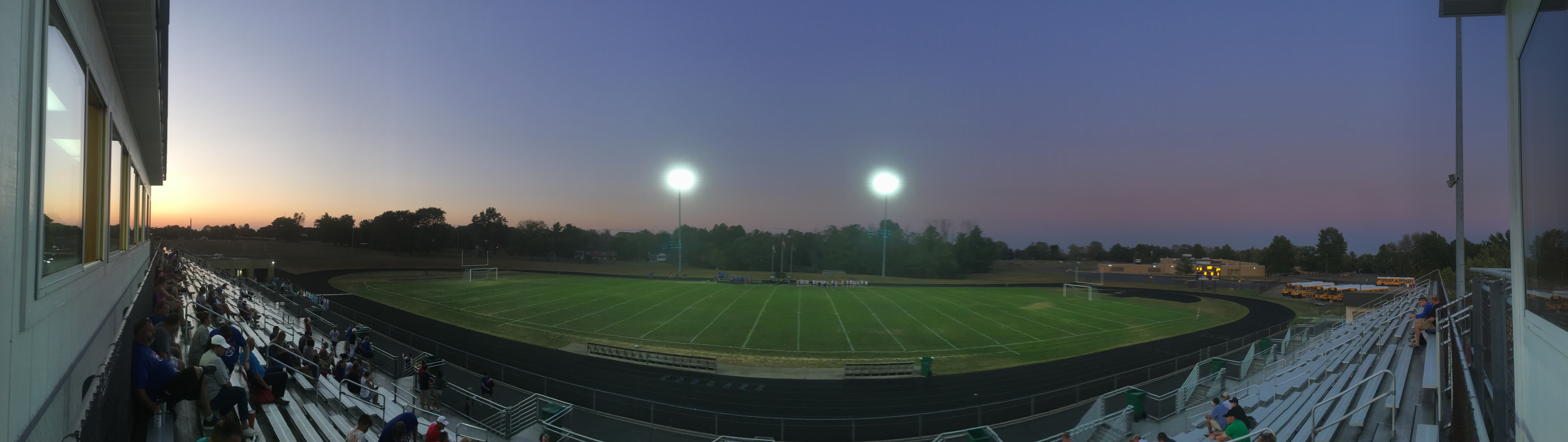
Colonel Stadium at Dixie Heights High School

The school was built by the Works Progress Administration. It opened for classes in 1936 and was dedicated by Eleanor Roosevelt. It was originally to be named for Franklin D. Roosevelt.

The school is on U.S. Route 25/U.S. Route 42 (Dixie Highway). The main building is nearly identical in construction and materials to Simon Kenton High School, located in Independence, Kentucky. Before the renovations to both Dixie Heights High School and Simon Kenton High School, they were known as sister schools.

== Extracurricular activities ==
=== Athletics ===
Dixie Heights athletic teams are known as the Colonels. The school is placed in Class 6A for postseason competition. The school currently offers: football, soccer, cross country, volleyball, golf, basketball, wrestling, swimming, baseball, softball, tennis, and track. They also offer Bowling, Cheerleading, Esports, and Archery.

=== Academics ===
Dixie Heights has an academic team. Their academic team participates in the KAAC (The Kentucky Association for Academic Competition).

They also participate in the Northern Kentucky Quizbowl League

=== Arts ===
Dixie offers band, Color guard, theatre, and Art Club programs to their students.

== Notable alumni ==
- Skeeter Davis, singer
- Trey Grayson, Kentucky Secretary of State (2004–2011)
- David S. Mann, former mayor of Cincinnati, Ohio
- Mark Pike, NFL player with the Buffalo Bills
- Brian Pillman Jr., professional wrestler
- Graham Taylor, former MLB player who briefly played with the Florida Marlins
- Ron Ziegler, press secretary to Richard Nixon
