= St. Augustine Church Complex =

Historic church in Kentucky, United States

- U.S. National Register of Historic Places
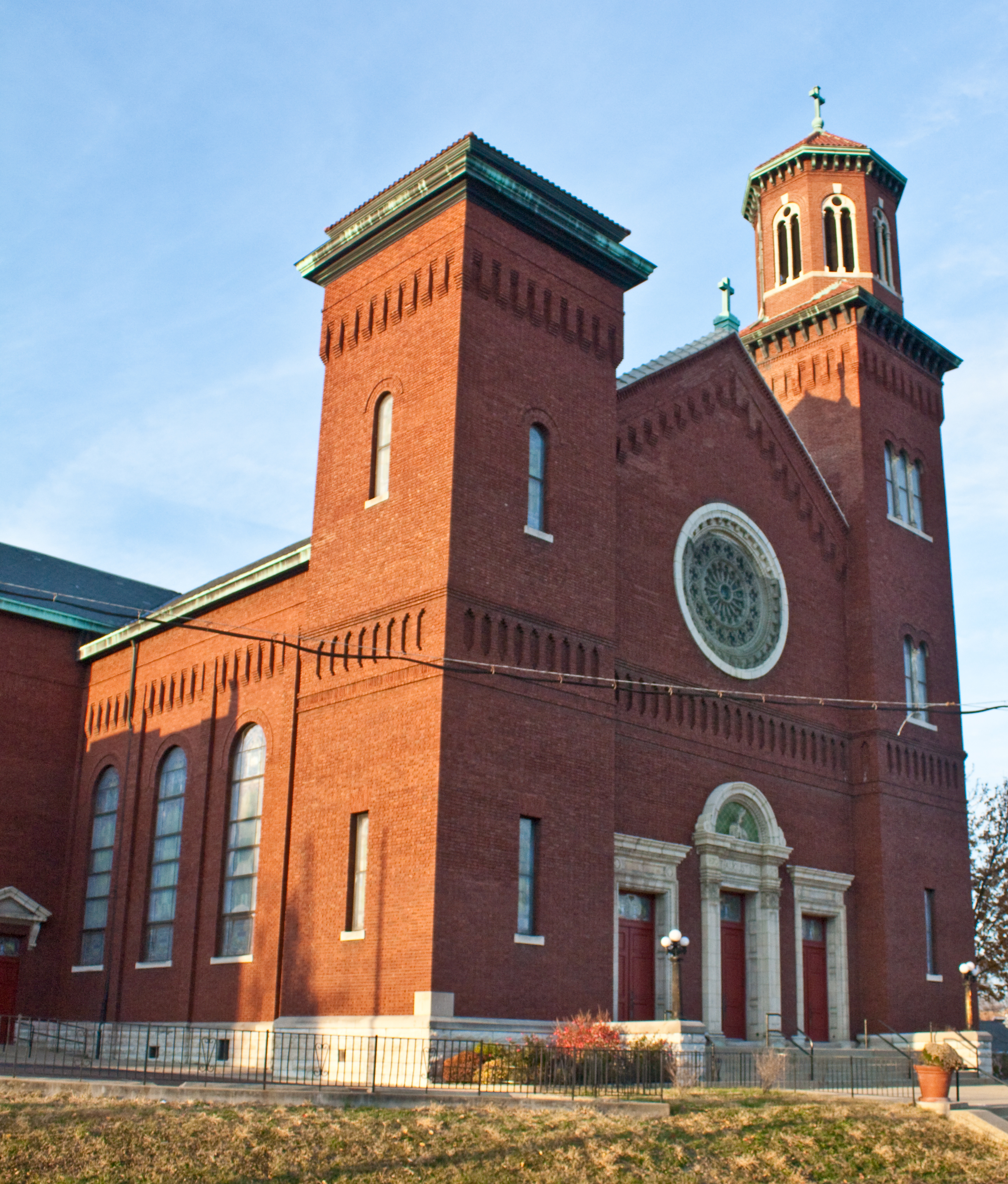

- Location within Kentucky Location within the United States
- Location: 1839 Euclid Ave., Covington, Kentucky
- Coordinates: 39°3′58″N 84°30′47″W
- Area: 2 acres (0.81 ha)
- Built: 1913
- Architect: Davis, David; McClorey, Howard
- Architectural style: Renaissance
- NRHP reference No.: 05001321
- Added to NRHP: November 25, 2005

St. Augustine Catholic Church is a historic church located at 1839 Euclid Avenue in Covington, Kentucky.

== History ==
The history of the St. Augustine parish began with the immigration of Germans to the Northern Kentucky area in the 1840s, and cresting in the 1890s. The German influx of immigrants to the area was attributable to economic hardship, religious persecution and the harsh treatment by the Prussian government. In addition, advertising of attractive prices for pork played a large part in enticing the Germans to the Ohio River Valley of Northern Kentucky and Cincinnati.

Initial settlement concentrated in the Main Strasse neighborhood of Covington, but by the 1860s and 1870s, the Germans began to move into the southwestern part of the city, a separate entity known as the City of Central Covington. St. Augustine was the fifth Catholic parish established in Covington and the original St. Augustine church was built in 1870. The Reverend Father Joseph Goebbels led the church in the 1870s and organized a wire nail factory to pay back the debt incurred in constructing the church. The enterprise was not successful, in part because of the Panic of 1873, and a number of parishioners lost their life savings in the venture.

The parish was returned to a sound financial footing by Father Paul Abeln who was pastor from 1883 until his death in 1911.

=== Pastors ===
A history of the parish's pastors is provided by the parish website:

Pastor	Years served
Fr. L. Neumaier	1870-1871
Fr. Joseph Goebbels	1871-1877
Fr. William Robbers	1877-1879
Fr. Clement Jesse	1879-1883
Fr. Paul Abeln	1831-1911
Fr. William Kathman	1911-1926
Msgr. Charles Woeste	1926-1957
Msgr. Joseph Lubrecht	1957-1977
Fr. Joseph Broering	1977-1987
Fr. Donald Hellmann	1987-1992
Fr. Leo Schmidt	1992-2015
Fr. Thomas Dorn	2015-2017
Fr. Dan Schomaker	2017-Present

== Architecture ==
The existing church was designed by local architect David Davis (1865–1932), who also designed the 1910 Cathedral Basilica of the Assumption, Covington. Little is known of Davis, considering he designed two prominent churches in the city. Construction began on the Euclid Avenue structure in 1913 under the direction of Father William Kathman and the church was dedicated by Bishop Camillus P. Macs on December 20, 1914. The church stands 60' high, 52' wide, 92' in the transept and 160' long. Seating capacity is 1000. Its 100th anniversary was in 2018. The school held a celebration for that.

Construction of the existing school building, built of the same dark red brick as the church, began in 1915, and was completed in September 1916.

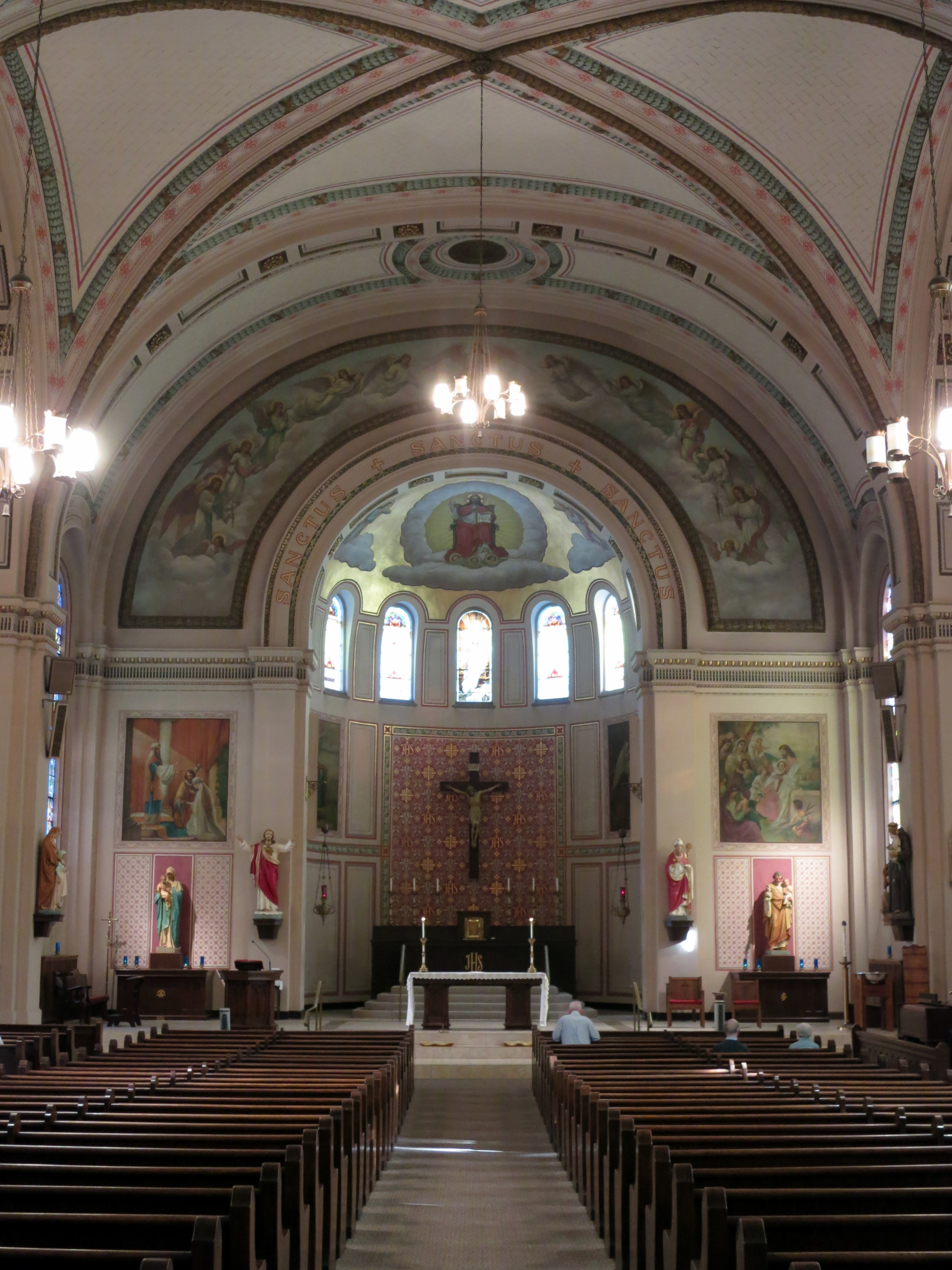
Interior
