= Robert F. Schulkers =

American author (1890-1972)

Robert F. Schulkers (21 July 1890, Covington, Kentucky — 6 April 1972, Cincinnati, Ohio) was the author of a series of children's novels. The 11 novels were published first between 1921 and 1932, although many appeared first in serialized form in The Cincinnati Enquirer and hundreds of other newspapers around the country. The eleven novels are: Stoner's Boy, Seckatary Hawkins in Cuba, The Red Runners, The Gray Ghost, Stormie the Dog Stealer, Knights of the Square Table, Ching Toy, The Chinese Coin, The Yellow Y, Herman the Fiddler, and The Ghost of Lake Tapaho.

Schulkers further popularized the series by means of a nationally syndicated NBC radio broadcast from Chicago and an extensive number of Seckatary Hawkins clubs in larger metropolitan areas. The official club name was "The Fair and Square Club". The club slogan was "A quitter never wins and a winner never quits".
