= Rickard D. Gwydir =

Major Rickard Daniel Gwydir (November 7, 1844 – November 7, 1925) was a Confederate soldier, Indian agent, and early Washington pioneer.

== Biography ==
Gwydir was born in Calcutta, India, to Richard McKenna Gwydir, a Protestant Irish soldier in the British Army, and Jane Prendible, also Irish. His father died of cholera when he was two, and his mother took him to the United Kingdom of Great Britain and Ireland and later Brooklyn, New York City, before settling in Kentucky in the 1850s. By that time, she had remarried to Daniel Ruttle.

In 1861, at the age of 16, Gwydir enlisted in the Confederate States Army, spying and scouting for John Hunt Morgan's raiders of Covington, Kentucky.

After the American Civil War, Gwydir worked for his stepfather in the pork packing and distillation business before embarking on his long career in public service. He served as Covington's Superintendent of Public Works and city auditor, and as gauger for the Internal Revenue Service.

In 1886, President Grover Cleveland appointed Gwydir Indian agent to the Colville Indian Reservation in Northeast Washington. This began his life as a pioneer, diplomat, administrator, and appreciator of Indian and pioneer life. In 1889 he prospected gold and mined the remote hills of the Inland Empire, and he served as Chinese Inspector for the Treasury from 1893 to 1898.

In 1901, Gwydir settled in Spokane and became a prominent resident and respected public servant there. Newspapers from the era refer to him frequently; he was known as the "Barbecue King of the Inland Empire" as well as for his vigorous health.

Although Gwydir served as Indian agent after sweeping reforms in Indian policy, the paternalistic attitude towards Native Americans typical of the time is evident in his writings. Nonetheless, his fair dealings with the tribes in his charge earned him their respect, and he repeatedly urged the government to provide more material support to the Indians, especially when promises had yet to be kept.

Gwydir left a memoir of his frontier experiences wherein he recorded oral traditions of both settlers and Indians. He wrote and commented on Okanogan Smith, Chief Tonasket, Chief Joseph, Chief Moses, and Skolaskin, the prophet-chief of the fiercely independent Sanpoil. His chief concern in his writings is the preservation of the history of the early settlers of the region and the recognition of their efforts to tame the wild country.

Gwydir died on November 7, 1925.

== Sources ==
- Gwydir, Rickard D., edited and with an introduction by Kevin Dye. Recollections from the Colville Agency 1886-1889. Spokane: Arthur H. Clark Company, 2001. ISBN 0-87062-303-6
