= Fifth District School =

- U.S. National Register of Historic Places
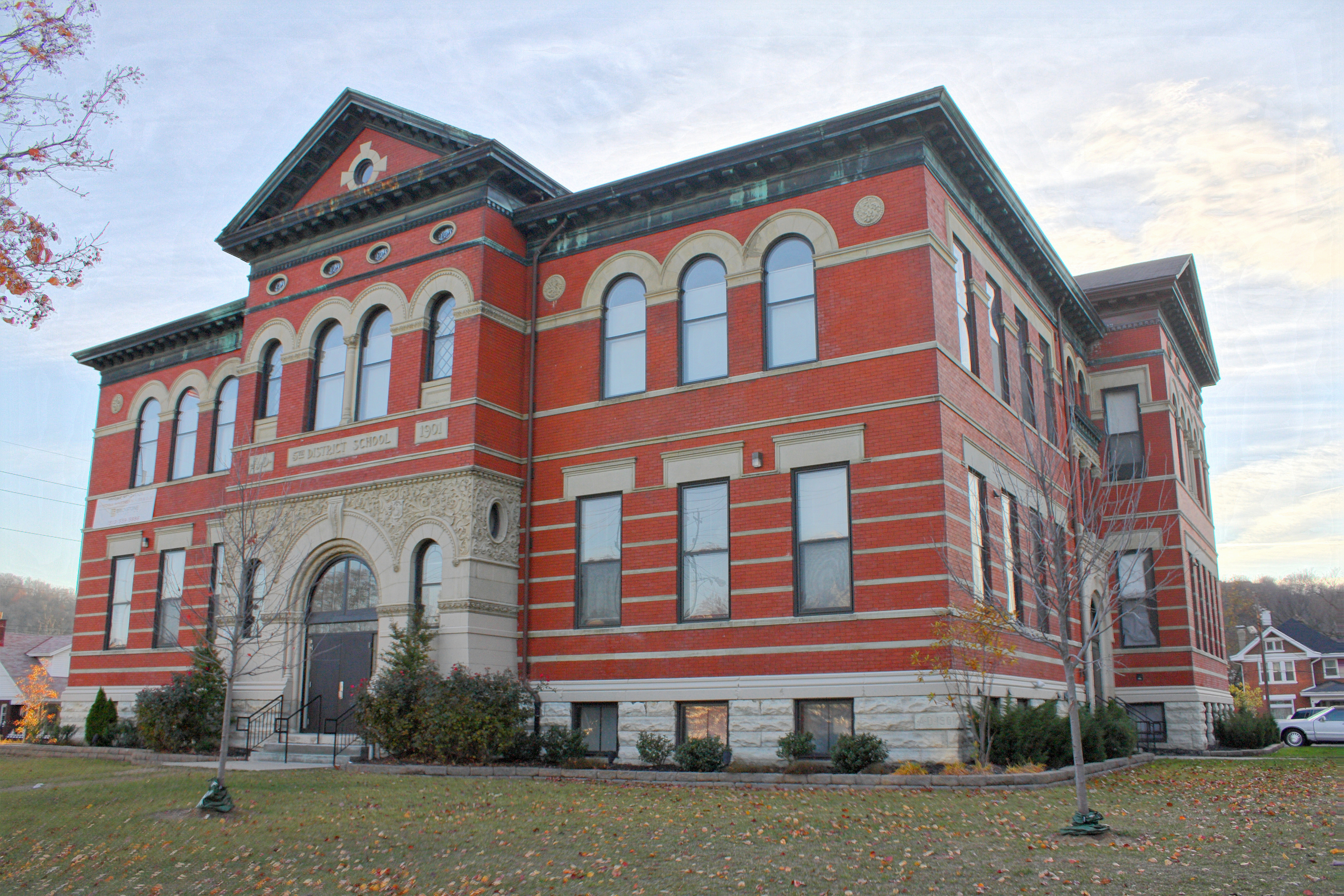

- Location within Kentucky Location within the United States
- Location: 1735 Holman Ave., Covington, Kentucky
- Coordinates: 39°04′07″N 84°30′43″W
- Area: 1 acre (0.40 ha)
- Built: 1901
- Architect: Schofield & Rabe, Hildreth, Charles
- Architectural style: Late Victorian Romanesque
- NRHP reference No.: 05001320
- Added to NRHP: November 25, 2005

The Fifth District School is a 1901 two story, rectangular, unpainted brick structure situated in the Peaselburg neighborhood of Covington, Kentucky, USA. The building comprises 47,308 feet under roof including a 1937 addition measuring 25'x 85'. The Peaselburg neighborhood consists of modest late 19th and early 20th century dwellings, primarily single family residences. The building served as an elementary school from 1902 until its closure in 1972 attributable to a decline in the school age population and the need to upgrade the structure to meet revised Board of Education building codes.

The building was designed by Schofield & Rabe, architects from Covington who were only in business for six years, from 1898 to 1904. Construction began in 1901 and finished on July 22, 1902.

The school was initially built with six classrooms on each floor. As enrollment increased, an addition in 1937 provided two more classrooms per floor. After its closure as an elementary school in 1972, the building continued to function as a head start school, though it was no longer part of the Covington Independent School system. Adult education programs were added and the school continued to operate until it was finally closed in 1998. The building was declared surplus property in 2001 and sold to private owners.
