= Ludlow Independent Schools =

School district in Kentucky, United States

Address
- 525 Elm Street Northern Kentucky Ludlow, Kenton, Kentucky, 41016

District information
- Grades: PreK-12
- Superintendent: Dr. Jason Steffen
- Schools: 2

Students and staff
- Students: 813
- Teachers: 59
- Student–teacher ratio: 14:1
- Athletic conference: KHSAA
- District mascot: Panthers
- Colors: Red and Black

Other information
- Website: www.ludlow.kyschools.us

Ludlow Independent School District, or Ludlow Independent Schools, is a school district headquartered in Ludlow, Kentucky, in the Cincinnati metropolitan area.

The district includes almost all of Ludlow and the majority of Bromley.

== History ==
The school district was created around the 1900s.

Curtis Hall served as superintendent until 2011, when he resigned.

In 2022 there were plans to renovate the schools, with a total of $31 million to be spent. Of that, $23 million came from the Kentucky state government.
