= Holy Cross Church and School Complex-Latonia =

Historic church in Kentucky, United States

- Holy Cross Church and School Complex--Latonia
- U.S. National Register of Historic Places
- U.S. Historic district
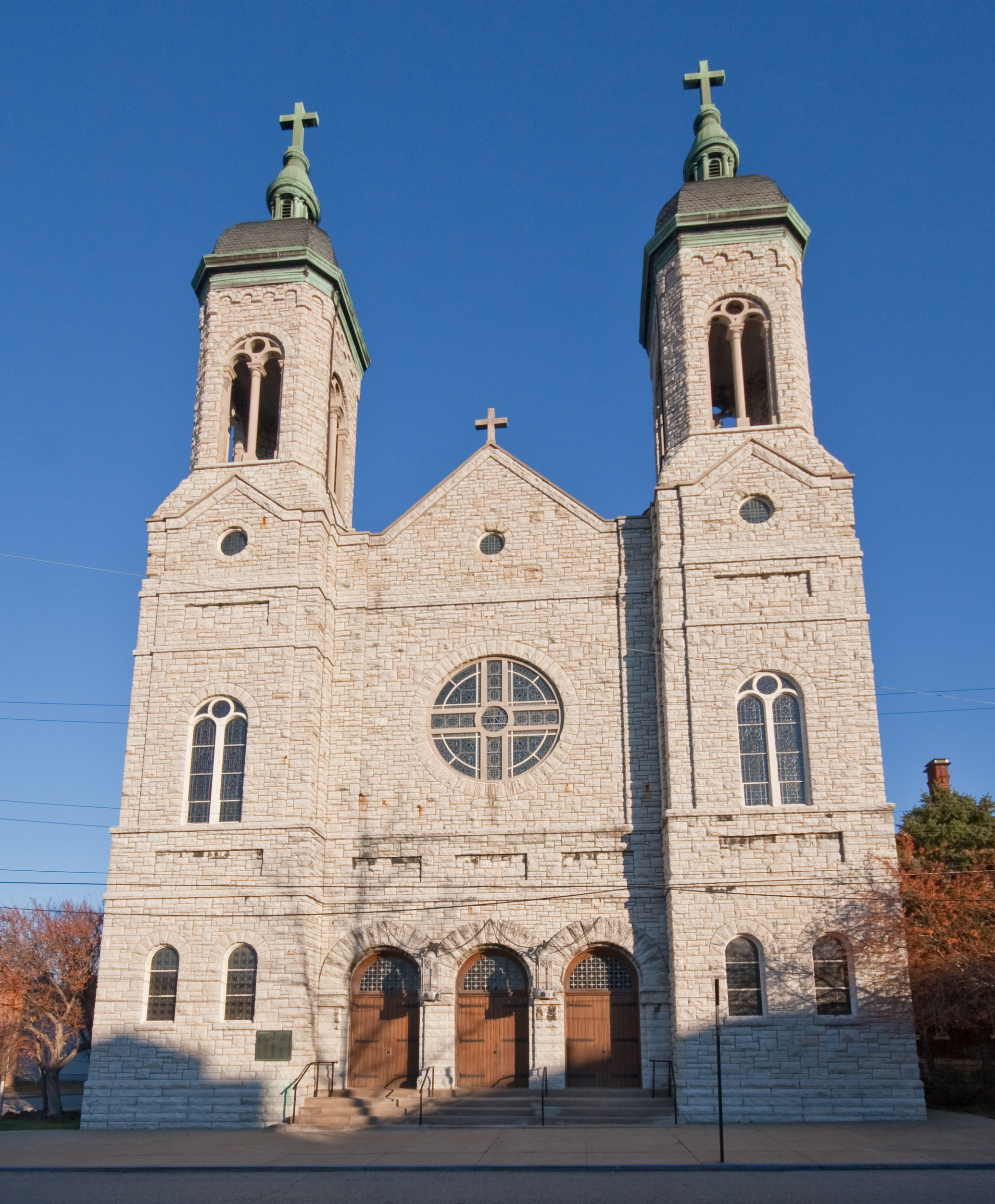

- Location within Kentucky Location within the United States
- Location: 3612 Church Street; Covington, Kentucky
- Coordinates: 39°2′52″N 84°30′8″W
- Area: 3.3 acres (1.3 ha)
- Built: 1908
- Architect: Kunz, Anthony, Jr.; Et al.
- Architectural style: German Renaissance
- NRHP reference No.: 86000800
- Added to NRHP: April 17, 1986

Holy Cross Church and School Complex—Latonia is a historic church of the Roman Catholic Diocese of Covington at 3612 Church Street in Covington, Kentucky. The campus straddles Church Street with the sanctuary and rectory on the east side and elementary school, high school and convent on the west. The church was constructed between 1906 and 1908 with the elementary school added in 1914, rectory in 1924, the high school in 1930 and the convent in 1941. The complex was added to the National Register in 1986.

== History ==
The parish was carved from a portion of the parish of St. Augustine in the adjacent Peaselburg neighborhood in 1889. Residents of Latonia first petitioned Bishop Camillus Paul Maes for a more convenient place of worship in 1887; however, he denied their request because St. Augustine's was facing financial problems. By 1889, the crisis eased and the bishop approved the new parish.

Construction of the first church began August 24, 1890 and the structure was complete in March 1891 on the west side of Church Street (then known as Longworth Street). By 1903, the congregation was already outgrowing the facilities and the parish began to acquire additional land for a new building. Construction of the current sanctuary began July 16, 1906 and it was dedicated November 29, 1908.
