= Edgewood, Kentucky =

- City
- Flag Seal

- Location of Edgewood in Kenton County, Kentucky
- Coordinates: 39°00′32″N 84°33′38″W
- Country: United States
- State: Kentucky
- County: Kenton

Government
  - Mayor: John Link

Area
  - Total: 4.29 sq mi (11.10 km^{2})
  - Land: 4.26 sq mi (11.04 km^{2})
  - Water: 0.023 sq mi (0.06 km^{2})
- Elevation: 833 ft (254 m)

Population (2020)
  - Total: 8,435
  - Estimate (2022): 8,398
  - Density: 1,979.1/sq mi (764.15/km^{2})
- Time zone: UTC−5 (Eastern (EST))
  - Summer (DST): UTC−4 (EDT)
- ZIP Codes: 41017–41018
- Area code: 859
- FIPS code: 21-23932
- GNIS feature ID: 2403542
- Website: https://edgewoodky.gov/

Edgewood is a home rule–class city in Kenton County, Kentucky, United States. The population was 8,435 at the 2020 census. It was named for an early homestead in Walker Estates.

Edgewood was incorporated by act of the state assembly on November 15, 1948. Part of what was early Edgewood was called South Ft Mitchell. In 1968, two nearby cities merged – Summit Hills Heights (incorporated 1962) and St. Pius Heights (incorporated 1965). The new city government began operation on January 1, 1969.

== Geography ==
Edgewood is located in north-central Kenton County and is bordered to the north by Crestview Hills, to the northeast by Fort Wright, to the east by Covington, and to the south and west by Erlanger. The Dixie Highway (here bearing U.S. Routes 25, 42, and 127) runs through the northwestern end of the city, leading northeast 6 miles (10 km) to the center of Covington and southwest 3 miles (5 km) to Florence. Interstate 275, the beltway around Cincinnati, passes just north of the Edgewood city limits, with access from Exit 83 (the Dixie Highway).

According to the United States Census Bureau, Edgewood has a total area of 4.2 square miles (11.0 km^{2}), of which 0.03 square miles (0.07 km^{2}), or 0.65%, are water.

== Demographics ==
Historical population
Census	Pop.	Note	%±
1960	1,100		—
1970	4,139		276.3%
1980	7,243		75.0%
1990	8,143		12.4%
2000	9,400		15.4%
2010	8,575		−8.8%
2020	8,435		−1.6%
2024 (est.)	8,526		1.1%
U.S. Decennial Census

=== 2020 census ===
As of the 2020 census, Edgewood had a population of 8,435. The median age was 45.3 years. 22.7% of residents were under the age of 18 and 23.0% of residents were 65 years of age or older. For every 100 females there were 98.1 males, and for every 100 females age 18 and over there were 93.6 males age 18 and over.

100.0% of residents lived in urban areas, while 0.0% lived in rural areas.

There were 3,205 households in Edgewood, of which 29.6% had children under the age of 18 living in them. Of all households, 66.4% were married-couple households, 11.2% were households with a male householder and no spouse or partner present, and 18.7% were households with a female householder and no spouse or partner present. About 20.3% of all households were made up of individuals and 11.2% had someone living alone who was 65 years of age or older.

There were 3,334 housing units, of which 3.9% were vacant. The homeowner vacancy rate was 1.1% and the rental vacancy rate was 15.7%.

Racial composition as of the 2020 census
Race	Number	Percent
White	7,858	93.2%
Black or African American	52	0.6%
American Indian and Alaska Native	4	0.0%
Asian	109	1.3%
Native Hawaiian and Other Pacific Islander	0	0.0%
Some other race	45	0.5%
Two or more races	367	4.4%
Hispanic or Latino (of any race)	181	2.1%

=== 2000 census ===
As of the census of 2000, there were 9,400 people, 3,099 households, and 2,693 families residing in the city. The population density was 2,250.8 inhabitants per square mile (869.0/km^{2}). There were 3,149 housing units at an average density of 754.0 per square mile (291.1/km^{2}). The racial makeup of the city is 97.74% White, 1.23% African American, 0.19% Native American, 0.08% Asian, 0.03% Pacific Islander, 0.19% from other races, and 0.55% from two or more races. 0.73% of the population are Hispanic or Latino of any race.

There were 3,099 households, out of which 44.4% had children under the age of 18 living with them, 78.4% were married couples living together, 6.2% had a female householder with no husband present, and 13.1% were non-families. Of all households, 11.1% were made up of individuals, and 4.5% had someone living alone who was 65 years of age or older. The average household size was 3.03 and the average family size was 3.29.

In the city, the population was spread out, with 29.1% under the age of 18, 7.9% from 18 to 24, 26.4% from 25 to 44, 27.9% from 45 to 64, and 8.7% who were 65 years of age or older. The median age was 38 years. For every 100 females, there were 97.4 males. For every 100 females age 18 and over, there were 94.6 males.

The median income for a household in the city was $76,218, and the median income for a family was $80,578. Males had a median income of $52,739 versus $34,327 for females. The per capita income for the city was $29,962. About 0.7% of families and 1.5% of the population were below the poverty line, including 2.0% of those under age 18 and 0.9% of those age 65 or over.

== Points of interest ==
- Presidents Park: A 20-acre (8.1 ha) park located at 283 Dudley Road. The park has baseball fields, hiking trails and basketball courts.
- St. Elizabeth Hospital: A full-service hospital located at 1 Medical Village Drive. St. E has been rated one of the top 50 hospitals in the U.S. from 2006 to 2011 by HealthGrades.
- Freedom Park: A second park that has volleyball, baseball, soccer, along with an open field. It is located by the intersection of Dudley Road and Thomas More Parkway.

== Education ==
Most of Edgewood is in the Kenton County School District. Portions of Edgewood are in Erlanger-Elsmere Schools. The latter portion is zoned to Dixie Heights High School

== Notable people ==
- Tom Browning, the only Cincinnati Reds pitcher to pitch a perfect game; formerly lived in Edgewood
- Luke Maile, catcher for the Kansas City Royals
- Brian Pillman Jr., professional wrestler
