= Kenton Vale, Kentucky =

- City
- Location of Kenton Vale in Kenton County, Kentucky.
- Coordinates: 39°03′05″N 84°31′12″W
- Country: United States
- State: Kentucky
- County: Kenton
- Incorporated: 1949
- Named for: Kenton County

Area
  - Total: 0.054 sq mi (0.14 km^{2})
  - Land: 0.054 sq mi (0.14 km^{2})
  - Water: 0 sq mi (0.00 km^{2})
- Elevation: 535 ft (163 m)

Population (2020)
  - Total: 105
  - Density: 1,962.3/sq mi (757.64/km^{2})
- Time zone: UTC-5 (Eastern (EST))
  - Summer (DST): UTC-4 (EDT)
- ZIP code: 41015
- Area code: 859
- FIPS code: 21-42094
- GNIS feature ID: 2404823

Kenton Vale is a home rule-class city in Kenton County, Kentucky, in the United States. The population was 105 at the 2020 census.

Kenton Vale consists of only one subdivision and a cemetery branching off Madison Pike (Kentucky Route 17). The subdivision was named for the county, which in turn was named for explorer and pioneer Simon Kenton. There is only one way in and out of the city: through the intersection of Kuhrs Lane and Madison Pike. Incorporated by the state legislature in 1949, the city was primarily created to keep Covington from annexing homes in the area.

== Geography ==
Kenton Vale is located at 39°3′5″N 84°31′12″W (39.051491, -84.520079). According to the United States Census Bureau, the city has a total area of 0.1 square miles (0.26 km^{2}), all land.

== Demographics ==
Historical population
Census	Pop.	Note	%±
1950	165		—
1960	168		1.8%
1970	178		6.0%
1980	145		−18.5%
1990	358		146.9%
2000	156		−56.4%
2010	110		−29.5%
2020	105		−4.5%
U.S. Decennial Census

As of the census of 2000, there were 156 people, 57 households, and 44 families residing in the city. The population density was 2,694.5 inhabitants per square mile (1,040.4/km^{2}). There were 59 housing units at an average density of 1,019.1 per square mile (393.5/km^{2}). The racial makeup of the city was 100.00% White.

There were 57 households, out of which 28.1% had children under the age of 18 living with them, 70.2% were married couples living together, 7.0% had a female householder with no husband present, and 21.1% were non-families. 17.5% of all households were made up of individuals, and 5.3% had someone living alone who was 65 years of age or older. The average household size was 2.74 and the average family size was 3.13.

In the city, the population was spread out, with 23.1% under the age of 18, 9.0% from 18 to 24, 29.5% from 25 to 44, 23.7% from 45 to 64, and 14.7% who were 65 years of age or older. The median age was 38 years. For every 100 females, there were 100.0 males. For every 100 females age 18 and over, there were 93.5 males.

The median income for a household in the city was $43,750, and the median income for a family was $50,625. Males had a median income of $30,625 versus $23,125 for females. The per capita income for the city was $19,540. About 1.9% of families and 3.1% of the population were below the poverty line, including 12.5% of those under the age of eighteen and none of those 65 or over.

== Education ==
Some of Kenton Vale in the Kenton County School District, while other parts are in the Covington Independent Public Schools.
