= Jamour Chames =

American painter

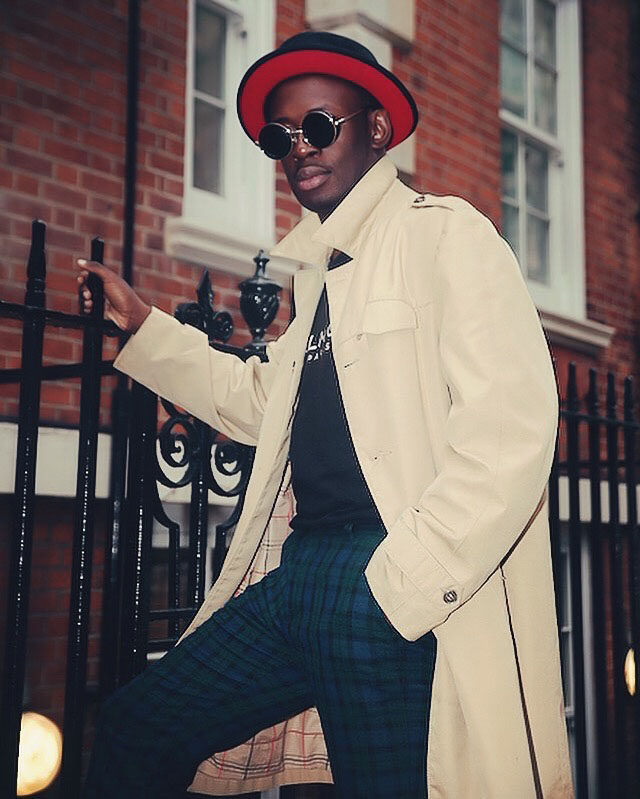
- Born: Jamour Chames; August 29, 1989 (age 36); Covington, Kentucky, U.S.
- Known for: Painting
- Notable work: Girl All Over the World (2015)
- Website: jamourchames.com

Jamour Chames (born August 29, 1989) is an American contemporary artist. His works have been exhibited internationally. He is most known for his 'Girl All Over the World' art collection, which is his body of work he dedicated to celebrating women. He lives and works in New York City.

== Biography ==
Jamour Chames was born in Covington, Kentucky on August 29, 1989. He graduated from Holmes High School.

== Works ==
Chames' signature style is minimalistic with a use of color and shapes. Jamour Chames' work explores positive imagery and he seeks to create artwork that makes a positive impact on the world. In his most recent body of work 'Girl All Over the World,' Chames celebrates women worldwide. With Girl All Over the World Chames' attempted to readjust the sexist imagery in art and shine a positive light on women in a non objectifying way. Chames has exhibited this body of work internationally.
