= Wallace A. Gaines =

American businessman, political figure (1858–1940)

Wallace Arkansas Gaines
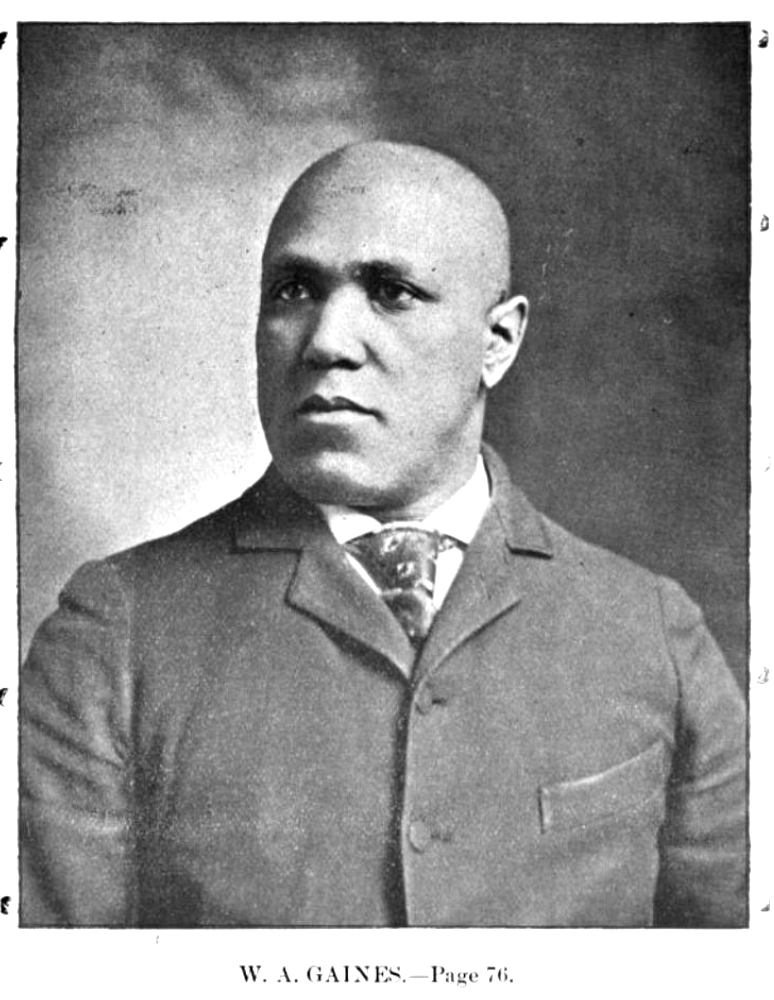
- Born: April 15, 1858; Dayton, Ohio, U.S.
- Died: August 3, 1940 (aged 82); Evansville, Indiana, U.S.
- Other name: W. A. Gaines
- Occupations: Businessman, funeral director, politician, elected official
- Political party: Republican
- Spouse: Tillie Young (m. 1913–1940; his death)

Wallace Arkansas Gaines, also known as W. A. Gaines, (April 15, 1858 – August 3, 1940) was an American businessman, funeral director, and an elected official. He was active within the Republican Party in Kentucky, and in the Freemasons. Gaines owned several businesses including W. A. Gaines Funeral Home, the first African American owned funeral home in the city of Covington, Kentucky.

== Early life and family ==
Wallace Arkansas Gaines was born on April 15, 1858, in Dayton, Ohio. His grandparents were Black from Harrodsburg, Kentucky, and Richmond, Virginia. When he was a baby his father died. His mother remarried when he was 3 years old, and he was moved to live with his grandparents in Mercer County, Ohio. Between age 6 to age 11, he attended public schools in Daytona. For many years starting at age 11, Gaines worked for a white family named Tenney, with his salary going to his grandparents. After his grandparents died he moved into his mother's house in Lima, Ohio, where he continued his schooling at the local public schools.

== Career ==
=== Businesses and funeral homes ===
He left his schooling early to work at an Ohio factory producing handles and spokes called E. & J. R. Ashton. The superintendent of the factory, M. W. H. Taylor purposed a partnership with Gaines. They built a handle factory together in Sunbury, Ohio in the 1870.

In 1875, he moved to Covington, Kentucky, Gaines had two uncles that lived there. He was active in multiple businesses in Covington. In 1880 he opened a second-hand store; and in 1887 he was the superintendent and accountant for a distillery, and created a business to distribute the spirits from the distillery.

He founded in Covington the first African American owned funeral home, W. A. Gaines Funeral Home. He opened in 1908 a funeral home location in Evansville, Indiana; and expanded the business again in 1912 in Henderson, Kentucky. The W. A. Gaines Funeral Home in Covington was sold in 1913 to Charles E. Jones.

From 1906 until 1910, Gaines was a founding member of the Progressive Building and Loan Association of Covington, Kentucky. He was also a director of the Liberty Life Insurance Company in Evansville, Indiana.

=== Politics and elected roles ===
In 1882, Gaines was appointed as a U.S. Storekeeper by United States Secretary of the Treasury John Sherman, and in 1889 he was appointed U.S. Gauger. In 1892, Gaines was elected a Kentucky state delegate-at-large to represent the Republican State League in Buffalo, New York.

Gaines was a Republican and he campaigned for Kentucky governor William O'Connell Bradley, and U.S. President William McKinley. Gaines was appointed by governor William O'Connell Bradley as Kentucky Commissioner to the Cotton States and International Exposition in Atlanta in 1895, and the Tennessee Centennial and International Exposition in 1897.

=== Fraternal organizations ===
Gaines was active in multiple fraternal organizations: he was a Knight Templar; a Grand Master of the Odd Fellows; was elected in 1889 as Grand Master of the Kentucky Brothers of Friendship and Sisters of the Mysterious Ten; and elected in 1897 as the Supreme Grand Master of the United Brothers of Friendship and Sisters of the Mysterious Ten.

== Late life and death ==
In July 1913, he married Tillie Young, a teacher. The couple moved to Evansville, Indiana after marriage.

He died on August 3, 1940, in Evansville, and was interred at Highland Cemetery in Fort Mitchell, Kentucky.
