= Bromley, Kentucky =

- City
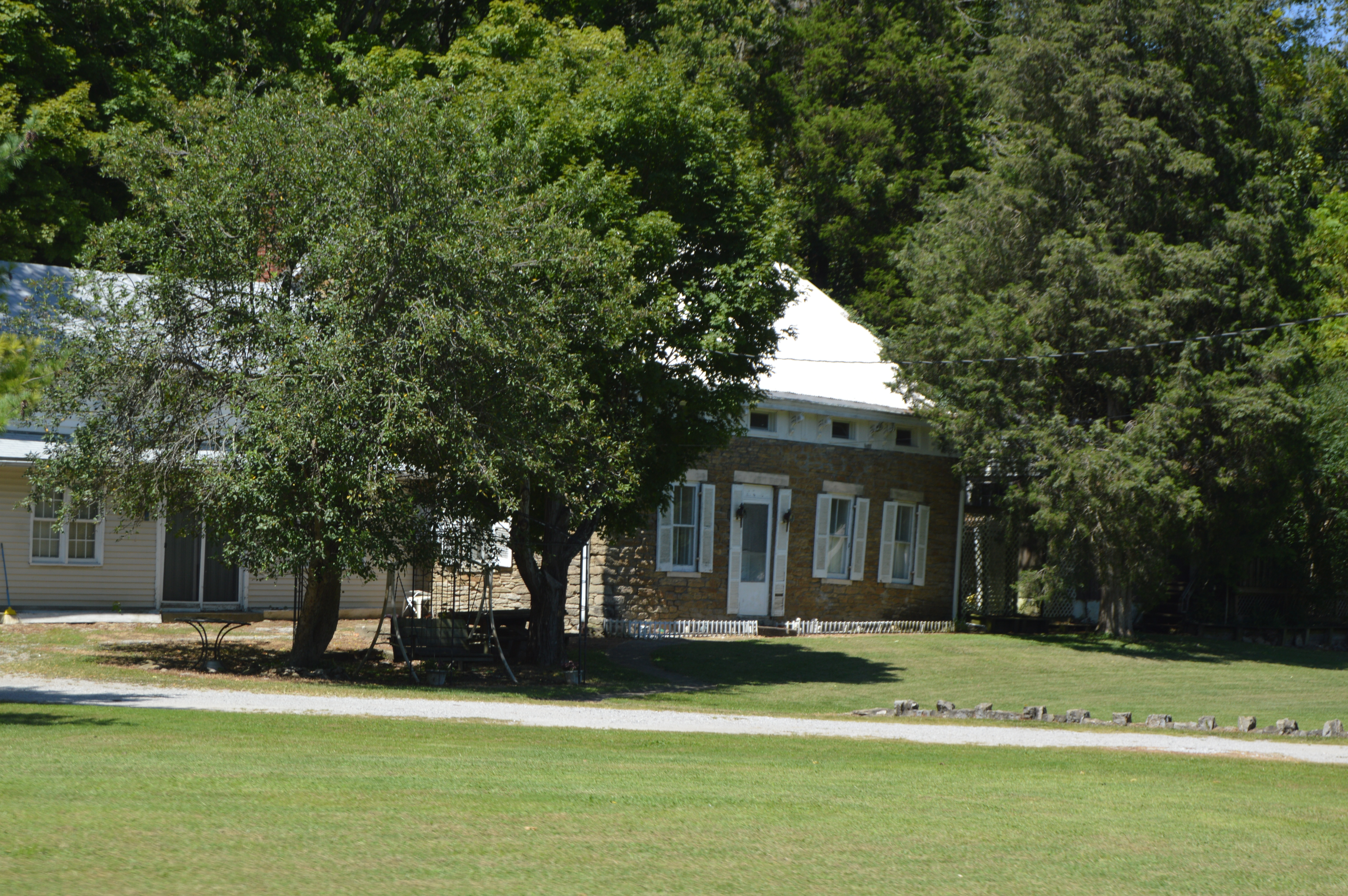
- Pleasant Run Stone House I south of Bromley

- Location of Bromley in Kenton County, Kentucky
- Coordinates: 39°04′49″N 84°33′47″W
- Country: United States
- State: Kentucky
- County: Kenton

Government
  - Mayor: Mike Denham

Area
  - Total: 0.51 sq mi (1.31 km^{2})
  - Land: 0.37 sq mi (0.97 km^{2})
  - Water: 0.13 sq mi (0.34 km^{2})
- Elevation: 505 ft (154 m)

Population (2020)
  - Total: 724
  - Density: 1,931.9/sq mi (745.92/km^{2})
- Time zone: UTC-5 (Eastern (EST))
  - Summer (DST): UTC-4 (EDT)
- ZIP codes: 41016-41017
- Area code: 859
- FIPS code: 21-09856
- GNIS feature ID: 2403932
- Website: www.cityofbromley.com

Bromley is a home rule-class city in Kenton County, Kentucky, United States, along the Ohio River. The population was 724 at the 2020 census. It is part of the Cincinnati metropolitan area.

== History ==
The settlement of Bromley can be traced to 1784, when Prettyman Merry received a land grant from the United States government of 2,000 acres (8.1 km^{2}). Soon thereafter, the Merry family began constructing a home on the property. This home still stands today on Shelby Street.

The Commonwealth of Kentucky officially approved the incorporation of the city of Bromley on May 23, 1890.

On December 14, 2023, the city became the site of a workplace disaster at Sanitation 1 near 2 Steve Tanner Street. Two male contractors were drowned, and third was hospitalized.

== Geography ==
Bromley is located on the northern edge of Kenton County. It sits on the south bank of the Ohio River and is bordered to the northeast (upstream) by the city of Ludlow and to the southwest (downstream) by the city of Villa Hills. To the south is Crescent Springs, and to the north, across the river in Ohio, is the city of Cincinnati. The nearest river crossing is the Brent Spence Bridge 3 miles (5 km) to the east, carrying Interstates 71 and 75.

Kentucky Route 8 passes through the center of Bromley, leading northeast into Ludlow and Covington and west along the river through Villa Hills to Taylorsport.

According to the United States Census Bureau, Bromley has a total area of 0.44 square miles (1.13 km^{2}), of which 0.34 square miles (0.87 km^{2}) are land and 0.10 square miles (0.26 km^{2}), or 22.75%, are water.

Several Bromley streets bear the names of prominent Kentucky historical figures, including Shelby Street (Isaac Shelby), Boone Street (Daniel Boone) and Kenton Street (Simon Kenton).

== Demographics ==
Historical population
Census	Pop.	Note	%±
1900	543		—
1910	819		50.8%
1920	736		−10.1%
1930	1,017		38.2%
1940	876		−13.9%
1950	980		11.9%
1960	998		1.8%
1970	1,069		7.1%
1980	844		−21.0%
1990	1,137		34.7%
2000	838		−26.3%
2010	763		−8.9%
2020	724		−5.1%
U.S. Decennial Census

As of the census of 2000, there were 838 people, 342 households, and 221 families residing in the city. The population density was 2,702.8 inhabitants per square mile (1,043.6/km^{2}). There were 362 housing units at an average density of 1,167.5 per square mile (450.8/km^{2}). The racial makeup of the city was 98.57% White, 0.48% Native American, 0.36% Asian, 0.12% from other races, and 0.48% from two or more races. Hispanic or Latino of any race were 0.48% of the population.

There were 342 households, out of which 30.4% had children under the age of 18 living with them, 43.0% were married couples living together, 15.5% had a female householder with no husband present, and 35.1% were non-families. 29.8% of all households were made up of individuals, and 12.6% had someone living alone who was 65 years of age or older. The average household size was 2.45 and the average family size was 3.07.

In the city, the population was spread out, with 26.5% under the age of 18, 9.5% from 18 to 24, 30.7% from 25 to 44, 19.1% from 45 to 64, and 14.2% who were 65 years of age or older. The median age was 34 years. For every 100 females, there were 94.9 males. For every 100 females age 18 and over, there were 91.9 males.

The median income for a household in the city was $31,563, and the median income for a family was $40,481. Males had a median income of $30,486 versus $24,886 for females. The per capita income for the city was $14,315. About 10.3% of families and 11.1% of the population were below the poverty line, including 9.9% of those under age 18 and 9.2% of those age 65 or over.

All of Bromley is in the Kenton County School District, with students having to pay tuition to attend local Ludlow Independent Schools.
