= Ludlow, Kentucky =

- City
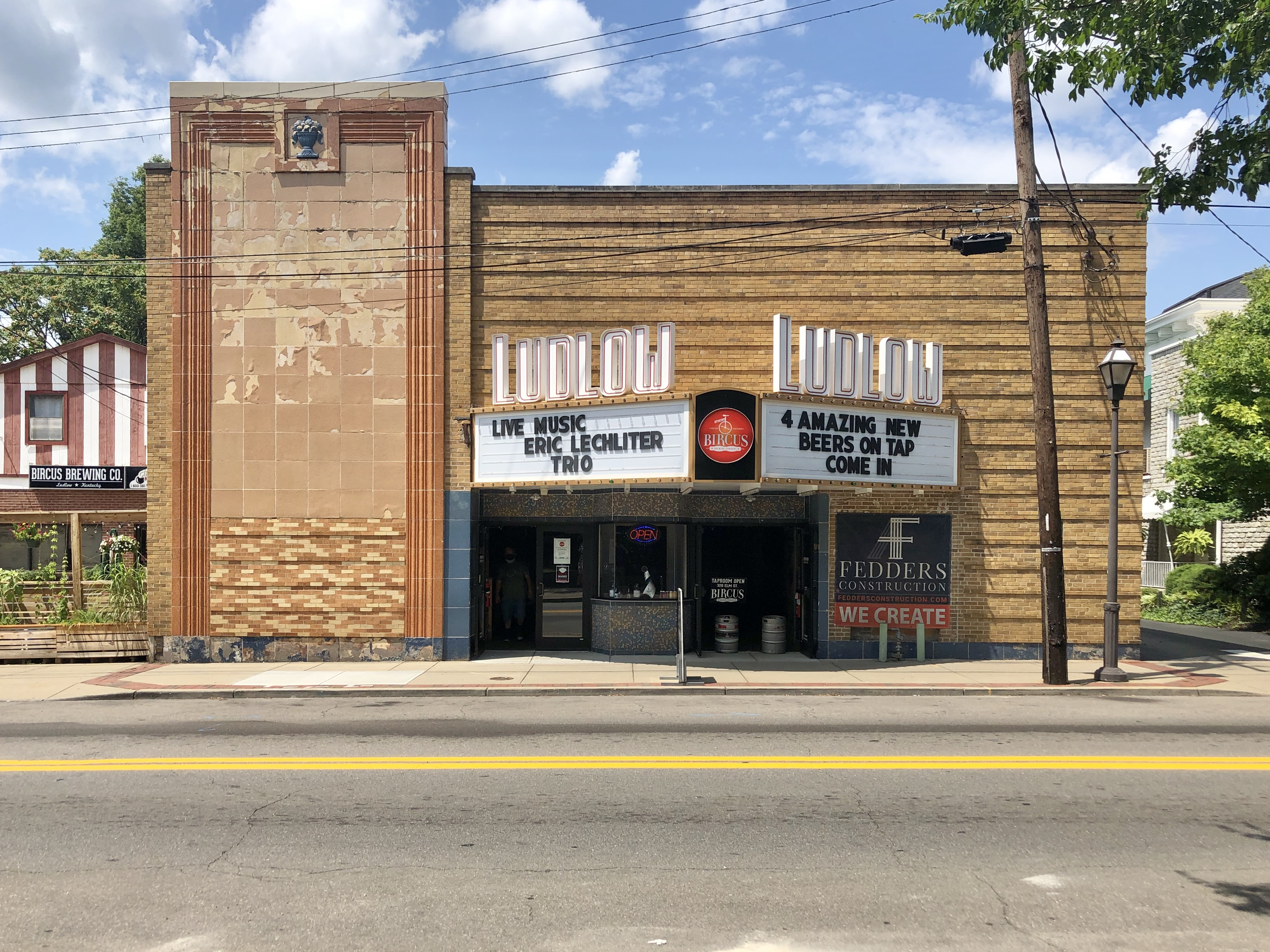
- Old Ludlow Theatre

- Location of Ludlow in Kenton County, Kentucky.
- Coordinates: 39°05′26″N 84°32′59″W
- Country: United States
- State: Kentucky
- County: Kenton
- Incorporated: 1864
- Named for: Israel Ludlow

Area
  - Total: 1.28 sq mi (3.31 km^{2})
  - Land: 0.92 sq mi (2.37 km^{2})
  - Water: 0.36 sq mi (0.93 km^{2})
- Elevation: 545 ft (166 m)

Population (2020)
  - Total: 4,385
  - Estimate (2024): 4,390
  - Density: 4,789.0/sq mi (1,849.06/km^{2})
- Time zone: UTC-5 (Eastern (EST))
  - Summer (DST): UTC-4 (EDT)
- ZIP code: 41016
- Area code: 859
- FIPS code: 21-48378
- GNIS feature ID: 2404969
- Website: www.ludlow.org

Ludlow is a home rule-class city in Kenton County, Kentucky, United States, along the Ohio River. The population was 4,385 at the 2020 census. It is a suburb of the Cincinnati metropolitan area. It received its greatest period of early growth as a rail station.

== History ==
=== Early history ===
In 1790, the land that is now Ludlow was given to Gen. Thomas Sandford as a grant in recognition of his service during the Revolutionary War. Sandford traded the land to Thomas D. Carneal for land in what is now Ft. Mitchell. Carneal had Elmwood Hall built on the riverfront in 1818. It still stands (as of 2011) at 244 Forest Avenue and is a private residence. Carneal later sold the land to William Bullock, a British showman, entrepreneur, and traveller, who directed John Papworth to design a utopian community for the site named Hygeia (Greek for "health"). Never realizing this plan, Bullock sold the land to Israel L. Ludlow in 1830. Ludlow was platted as a town in 1846. The city of Ludlow, named for the landowner, was incorporated in 1864.

As the Cincinnati Southern Railroad (Queen and Crescent Route) arrived in the 1870s, many people were enticed by Ludlow. Because of the adequate amount of railroad jobs, many people — mostly German and Irish — began moving to Ludlow. In the 1890s, a streetcar service, provided by The Green Line, also sparked popularity.

=== The Ludlow Lagoon ===
==== Construction and early success ====
Around the Bromley, Kentucky border, which is on the western edge of Ludlow, construction of a lake was started in 1894 by The Green Line streetcar company. The Green Line wanted an amusement park at the end of the Ludlow streetcar line. The lake, which was 85-acres and featured five islands, opened in 1895. It was originally used for fishing and boating. Additional attractions included a clubhouse used for dining, and a dance pavilion that hosted many orchestras and other music groups that were popular during the Jazz Age.

As time progressed, the Lagoon began to add many classic amusement park rides. The most popular was the Scenic Railway, which rode across the lake. It was designed by LaMarcus Thompson, who also designed the Scenic Railway at Coney Island in New York. Other attractions which contributed to the Lagoon's success were an amphitheater, a movie theatre, a vaudeville stage, and a Japanese-themed fair. The park also featured many walking trails, games, acrobats, and other performers. The park was receiving thousands of visitors each day by the early 1900s. The Ludlow Motordrome, which was opened on July 21, 1913, attracted large crowds. It was a motorcycle racetrack that could seat 8,000 spectators.

==== Damaging disasters ====
Just before the motordrome was built, the Great Flood of 1913 swept through Ludlow, damaging many attractions. Just nine days after the motordrome's opening on July 30, 1913, tragedy struck Ludlow once again. A driver lost control of his motorcycle during a race. The cycle crashed into a gas lamp, and set fire to the stands which killed at least ten people and injured over one-hundred people out of the 5,000 spectators present. Two years later, a tornado struck Ludlow in July 1915, which damaged many buildings and attractions of the Lagoon, causing $20,000 ($615,000 adjusted for 2024 inflation) in damage. The final blow of the Lagoon occurred as a result of World War I. Grain was needed for the war effort, so the U.S. Government restricted the amount of beer that was able to be produced. As a result, the Lagoon took a heavy blow because it sold local beer throughout the park. The Ludlow Lagoon ended its operations after the 1917 season. Since its closing, the lake has been filled in, and all attractions have been destroyed. Except for the clubhouse, which still stands at 312 Lake St.

=== Post World War I – present ===
After World War I, Ludlow experienced a time of growth subsequent to the shutdown of the Lagoon. On the east side of town, the Morningside neighborhood was annexed. On the west side of town, the area of the defunct Ludlow Lagoon was being redeveloped. Ludlow also experienced success after World War II. The Baby Boom increased the population to 6,374 by 1950 which filled churches and schools. The increased population also resulted in the development of the Ludlow Heights. However, in the 1960s, the population began to decline and has been declining ever since. In recent years, Ludlow has made minor developments, especially to its housing.

== Geography ==
According to the United States Census Bureau, the city has a total area of 1.2 square miles (3.1 km^{2}), of which 0.9 square miles (2.3 km^{2}) is land and 0.4 square miles (1.0 km^{2}) (30.65%) is water.

== Demographics ==
Historical population
Census	Pop.	Note	%±
1890	2,469		—
1900	3,334		35.0%
1910	4,163		24.9%
1920	4,582		10.1%
1930	6,485		41.5%
1940	6,185		−4.6%
1950	6,374		3.1%
1960	6,233		−2.2%
1970	5,815		−6.7%
1980	4,959		−14.7%
1990	4,736		−4.5%
2000	4,409		−6.9%
2010	4,407		0.0%
2020	4,385		−0.5%
2024 (est.)	4,390		0.1%
U.S. Decennial Census

=== 2020 census ===
As of the 2020 census, Ludlow had a population of 4,385. The median age was 37.9 years. 21.1% of residents were under the age of 18 and 13.8% of residents were 65 years of age or older. For every 100 females there were 98.9 males, and for every 100 females age 18 and over there were 99.0 males age 18 and over.

100.0% of residents lived in urban areas, while 0.0% lived in rural areas.

There were 1,963 households in Ludlow, of which 25.9% had children under the age of 18 living in them. Of all households, 33.9% were married-couple households, 24.1% were households with a male householder and no spouse or partner present, and 31.6% were households with a female householder and no spouse or partner present. About 36.3% of all households were made up of individuals and 9.8% had someone living alone who was 65 years of age or older.

There were 2,153 housing units, of which 8.8% were vacant. The homeowner vacancy rate was 2.4% and the rental vacancy rate was 6.5%.

Racial composition as of the 2020 census
Race	Number	Percent
White	3,990	91.0%
Black or African American	102	2.3%
American Indian and Alaska Native	6	0.1%
Asian	17	0.4%
Native Hawaiian and Other Pacific Islander	2	0.0%
Some other race	22	0.5%
Two or more races	246	5.6%
Hispanic or Latino (of any race)	98	2.2%

=== 2000 census ===
As of the census of 2000, there were 4,409 people, 1,739 households, and 1,135 families residing in the city. The population density was 5,141.5 inhabitants per square mile (1,985.1/km^{2}). There were 1,888 housing units at an average density of 2,201.7 per square mile (850.1/km^{2}). The racial makeup of the city was 98.46% White, 0.39% African American, 0.09% Native American, 0.14% Asian, 0.18% from other races, and 0.75% from two or more races. Hispanic or Latino of any race were 0.75% of the population.

There were 1,739 households, out of which 33.9% had children under the age of 18 living with them, 43.5% were married couples living together, 15.2% had a female householder with no husband present, and 34.7% were non-families. 30.2% of all households were made up of individuals, and 11.8% had someone living alone who was 65 years of age or older. The average household size was 2.54 and the average family size was 3.18.

In the city, the population was spread out, with 28.8% under the age of 18, 8.9% from 18 to 24, 31.3% from 25 to 44, 18.8% from 45 to 64, and 12.2% who were 65 years of age or older. The median age was 34 years. For every 100 females, there were 95.0 males. For every 100 females age 18 and over, there were 91.2 males.

The median income for a household in the city was $35,509, and the median income for a family was $44,441. Males had a median income of $34,890 versus $26,714 for females. The per capita income for the city was $16,015. About 8.8% of families and 11.0% of the population were below the poverty line, including 17.5% of those under age 18 and 14.9% of those age 65 or over.

== Education ==
The majority of Ludlow is in the Ludlow Independent Schools. One parcel of land is in the Covington Independent Public Schools.

== See also ==
- List of cities and towns along the Ohio River
