= Covington Independent Public Schools =

School district in Kentucky, United States

Address
- 25 East 7th Street Covington, Kentucky, 41011; United States

District information
- Type: Independent school district
- Grades: PreK–12
- Superintendent: Cortnei D. Flucas (2026–present)
- NCES District ID: 2101350

Students and staff
- Students: 4,073
- Teachers: 277.09
- Student–teacher ratio: 14.70

Other information
- Website: www.covington.kyschools.us

Covington Independent Public Schools is an independent school district serving Covington, Kentucky, United States. It is one of four independent school districts in Kenton County. With about 4,073 students as of 2019, it is the largest independent school district in Kentucky. The district's only high school, Holmes Junior/Senior High School, is the oldest public high school in Kentucky. The district also operates an early childhood center, five elementary schools, and an adult education program. With 914 employees, the district is Covington's fourth largest employer.

It includes much of Covington (to the north) and portions of Kenton Vale and Fort Wright.

== History ==
The first tuition-free school in Covington opened in 1825 in a log cabin with one teacher and 20 students. This and other early public schools were supervised by five appointed "school visitors". The Covington City Charter of 1850 replaced the school visitors with a board of trustees to govern the city's school system, a board of examiners to administer qualifying examinations to teachers, and a school superintendent. The charter also called for a tax-supported, tuition-free high school. Covington High School opened in 1853 as the first of its kind in Kentucky. The school system's first brick school opened the following year, and its first kindergartens opened in 1892.

Covington truant officers began enforcing school attendance in 1904, four years before compulsory education became law throughout Kentucky. As Covington annexed Latonia and Rosedale in 1909 and West Covington in 1916, the Covington Board of Education absorbed those communities' schools. The school board was reorganized in 1912 to consist of five members elected by popular vote.

The district's first school for African Americans opened in 1876 in a Methodist church on Madison Avenue. In 1932, a central elementary school for African Americans opened as Lincoln–Grant School, colocated with a new high school named William Grant High School. Integration began in earnest in 1959. William Grant High School closed in 1965 upon the integration of Holmes High School, while Lincoln–Grant School became integrated as the 12th District School in 1967. The district completed integration in the 1970s with involvement from the federal Department of Health, Education, and Welfare.

By 1988, Covington Independent Public Schools had become the largest independent school district in Kentucky. Enrollment peaked at about 6,000 students before declining with the city's population.

== Demographics ==
Covington Independent Public Schools serve a diverse population of students. According to the district's state report card, 45.6% of students are identified as white, 30.6% as African American, 14.1% as Hispanic, 9.2% as two or more races, and 0.6% as other.

== Schools ==
=== High School ===
- Holmes Junior/Senior High School

=== Middle School ===
- Holmes Middle School

=== Elementary ===
- Glenn O. Swing Elementary School
- John G. Carlisle Elementary School
- Latonia Elementary School
- Ninth District Elementary School
- Sixth District Elementary School

=== Early Childhood ===
- James E. Biggs Early Childhood Education Center

== See also ==
- List of school districts in Kentucky
