= Covington, Kentucky =

- City
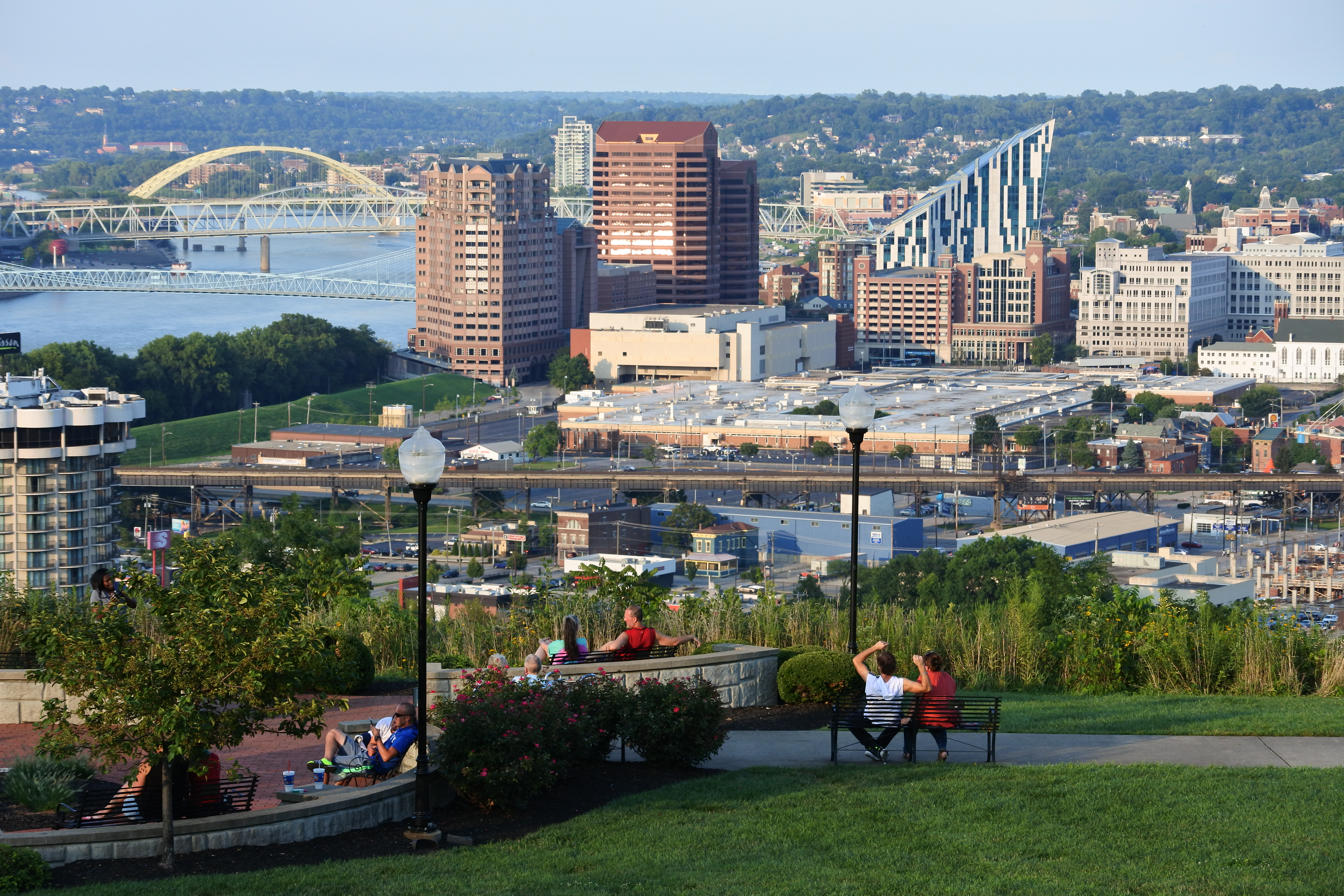
- Downtown Covington skyline

- Seal Logo
- Interactive map of Covington, Kentucky
- Location within Kentucky Location within the United States
- Coordinates: 39°02′00″N 84°31′00″W
- Country: United States
- State: Kentucky
- County: Kenton
- Founded: 1815

Government
  - Type: Commission-City Manager
  - Mayor: Ron Washington

Area
  - Total: 13.76 sq mi (35.63 km^{2})
  - Land: 13.20 sq mi (34.18 km^{2})
  - Water: 0.56 sq mi (1.45 km^{2})
- Elevation: 719 ft (219 m)

Population (2020)
  - Total: 40,961
  - Estimate (2024): 41,611
  - Density: 3,103.9/sq mi (1,198.42/km^{2})
- Time zone: UTC−5 (EST)
  - Summer (DST): UTC−4 (EDT)
- ZIP code: 41011-41012, 41014-41019
- Area code: 859
- FIPS code: 21-17848
- GNIS feature ID: 2404138
- Website: covingtonky.gov

Covington is a city in Kenton County, Kentucky, United States. It is located at the confluence of the Ohio and Licking rivers, across from Cincinnati, Ohio to the north and Newport to the east. It is the largest city in Northern Kentucky and the fifth-most populous city in the state with a population of 40,691 at the 2020 census. Covington is part of the Cincinnati metropolitan area and is one of Kenton County's two seats, along with Independence. Covington is a home-rule class city under Kentucky law.

== History ==
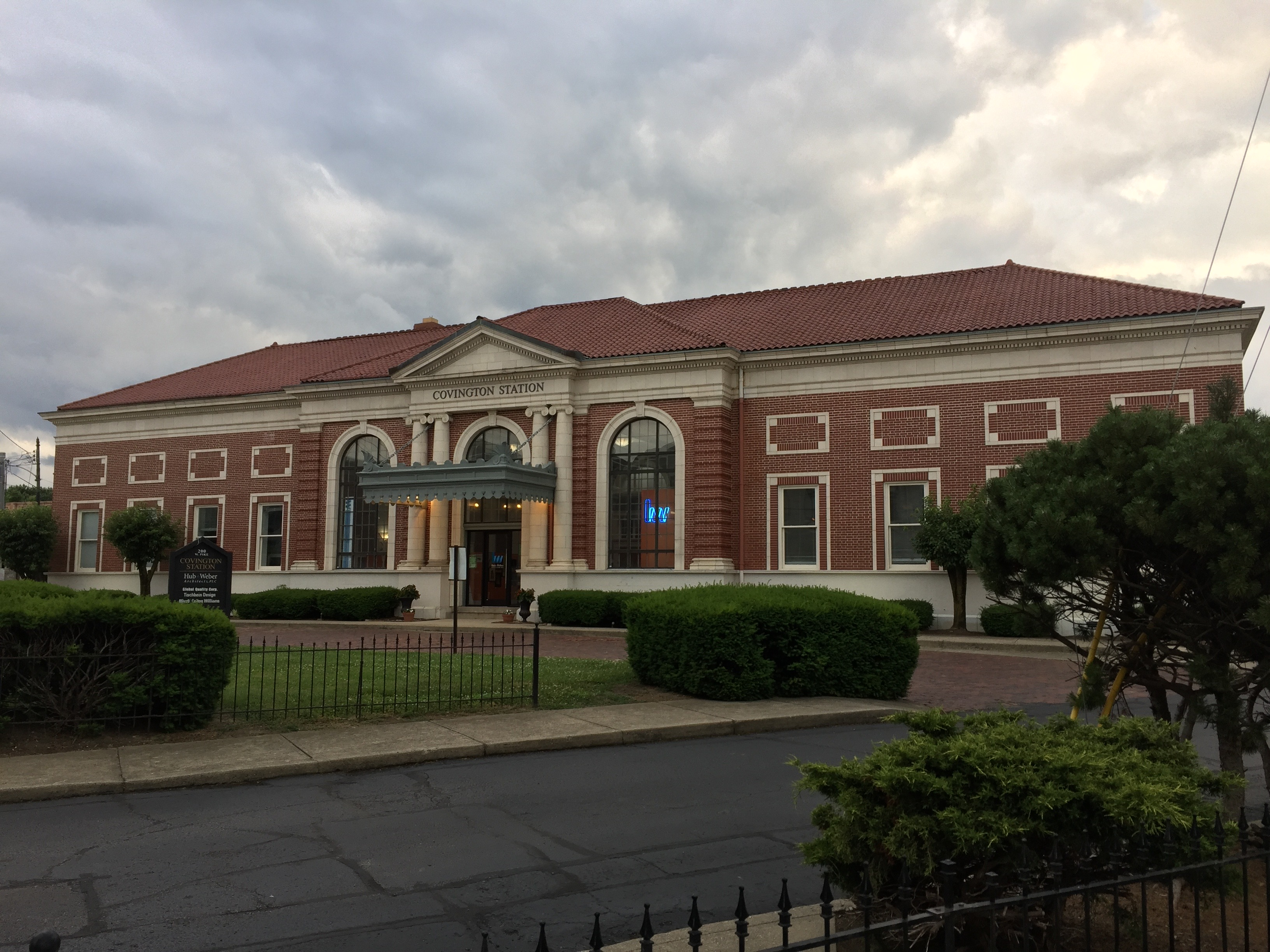
The former Union Station in 2018

In 1814, John Gano, Richard Gano, and Thomas Carneal purchased The Point, 150 acres (0.6 km^{2}) of land on the west side of the Licking River at its confluence with the Ohio, from Thomas Kennedy for $50,000, and laid out the settlement of Covington the next year. It was named in honor of Gen. Leonard Covington, who was killed at the Battle of Crysler's Farm during the War of 1812. The town was formally incorporated by the Kentucky General Assembly a year later and raised to city status in 1834.

The city prospered as an emporium for Kentucky's tobacco and cigar production. In 1862, Stewart Iron Works was established; for a time, it was the largest iron fence maker in the world and still exists today as part of the Huseman Group of Cincinnati. There were also distilleries, glassworks, and stove factories. Like nearby Cincinnati, Covington's factories and businesses were particularly staffed by Catholic and German immigrants. Its Catholic church was eventually raised to the level of a diocese.

The city was determined as the center of the country's population by the U.S. Census Bureau for the 1880 census.

By 1900, Covington was the second-largest city and industrial region in Kentucky. At the time, its population of almost 43,000 was about 12% foreign-born and 5% Black. By this time, it was connected to the Chesapeake & Ohio and Louisville & Nashville railways, and companies offered steamboat service to other ports on the Ohio River. Its factories had expanded to include cotton goods, machinery, and cordage.

Covington even boasted a Federal League baseball team, the Covington Blue Sox, during the 1913 season. The present-day circuit courthouse is located at the site of its former grounds, Federal Park, which is thought to have been the smallest stadium ever used by a professional baseball club.

It declined in importance during the Great Depression and the middle 20th century. The city has undergone some redevelopment during the late 20th and early 21st centuries as the most populous city in Kenton County.

The Covington Police Department has been sued 14 times in federal court since 2021. with half of those lawsuits involving the conduct of a single officer, Doug Ullrich.

== Geography ==
The city is on the south bank of the Ohio River with Cincinnati, Ohio across the river to the north. The Licking River forms the eastern boundary with Newport in the adjacent Campbell County.

According to the United States Census Bureau, Covington has a total area of 13.7 square miles (35 km^{2}), of which 13.1 square miles (34 km^{2}) is land and 0.5 square miles (1.3 km^{2}) (3.88%) is covered by water.

=== Neighborhoods ===
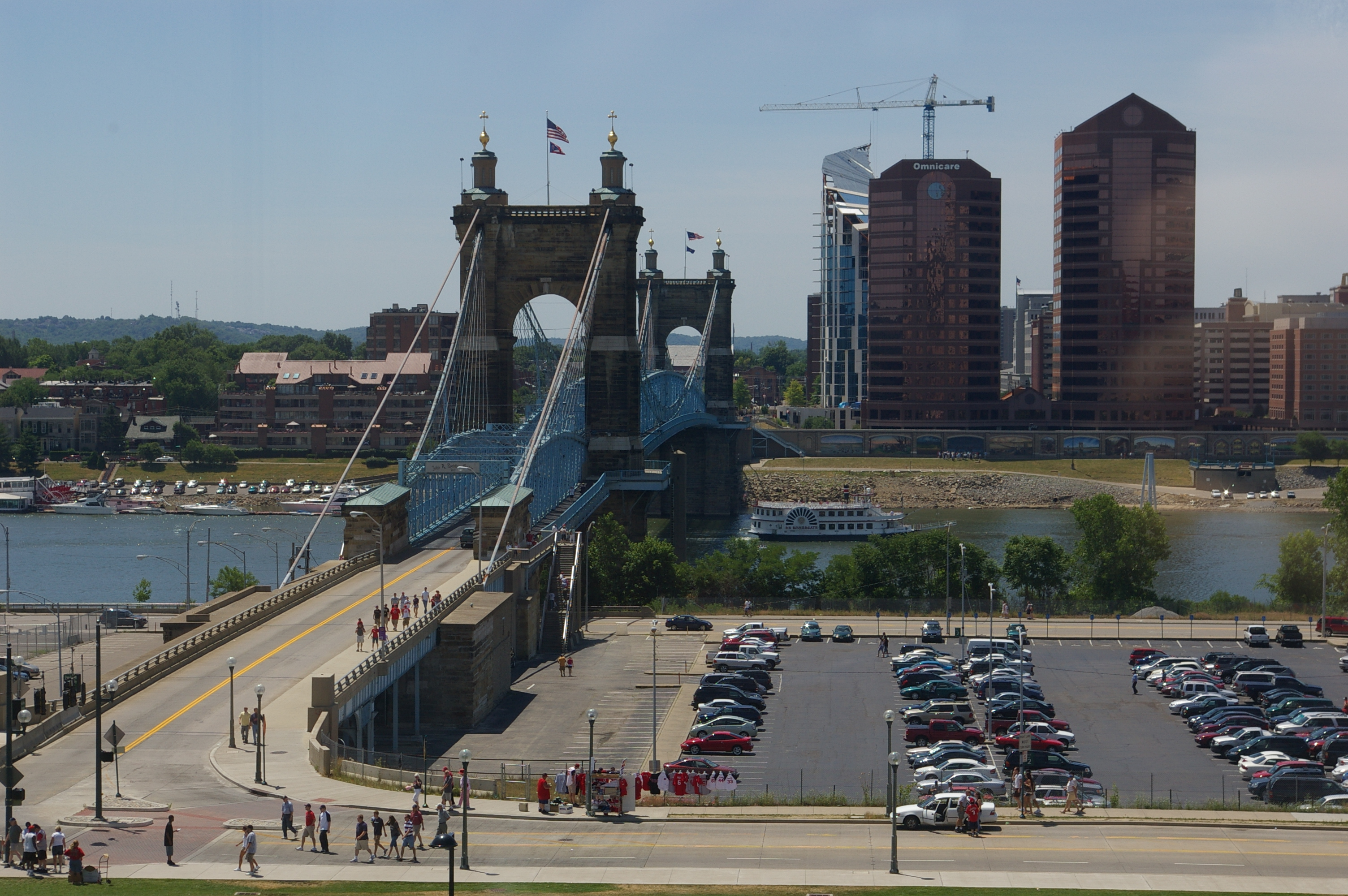
The John A. Roebling Suspension Bridge and Ohio River at Covington

Covington claims 19 distinct neighborhoods, ranging in population from several hundred to 10,000 people. Many of the neighborhoods are located in 12 historic districts that are predominantly found in the northern portion of the city, but Covington annexed many areas to the south in the late 20th and early 21st centuries to significantly enlarge its land area. Most of the neighborhoods have active resident associations or block watches that are dedicated to involving residents in strengthening their neighborhoods and improving safety, housing, and beautification.

=== Climate ===
Covington is located within a climatic transition zone; it is nestled within the southern end of the humid continental climate zone and the northern periphery of the humid subtropical climate of the Upland South, with hot, humid summers and cool winters. Evidence of both a humid subtropical and humid continental climate can be found here, particularly noticeable by the presence of plants indicative of each climatic region; for example, the southern magnolia (Magnolia grandiflora) from the subtropics and the blue spruce from cooler regions are successful landscape plants in and around Covington.

Climate data for Cincinnati (Cincinnati/Northern Kentucky Int'l), 1991–2020 normals, (Note: Mean monthly maxima and minima (i.e. the expected highest and lowest temperature readings at any point during the year or given month) calculated based on data at said location from 1991 to 2020.) extremes 1871–present (Note: Official records for Cincinnati kept at downtown from January 1871 to March 1915, at the Cincinnati Abbe Observatory just north of downtown from April 1915 to March 1947, and at KCVG near Hebron, Kentucky since April 1947. For more information, see Threadex and History of Weather Observations Cincinnati, Ohio 1789–1947.)
Month	Jan	Feb	Mar	Apr	May	Jun	Jul	Aug	Sep	Oct	Nov	Dec	Year
Record high °F (°C)	77 (25)	79 (26)	88 (31)	90 (32)	95 (35)	102 (39)	108 (42)	103 (39)	102 (39)	95 (35)	82 (28)	75 (24)	108 (42)
Mean maximum °F (°C)	61.8 (16.6)	66.1 (18.9)	74.3 (23.5)	81.1 (27.3)	86.7 (30.4)	91.6 (33.1)	93.6 (34.2)	93.2 (34.0)	90.7 (32.6)	82.9 (28.3)	72.0 (22.2)	63.8 (17.7)	95.3 (35.2)
Mean daily maximum °F (°C)	39.6 (4.2)	43.7 (6.5)	53.5 (11.9)	65.5 (18.6)	74.5 (23.6)	82.6 (28.1)	86.0 (30.0)	85.2 (29.6)	78.9 (26.1)	66.7 (19.3)	53.8 (12.1)	43.3 (6.3)	64.4 (18.0)
Daily mean °F (°C)	31.4 (−0.3)	34.7 (1.5)	43.6 (6.4)	54.6 (12.6)	64.1 (17.8)	72.3 (22.4)	75.9 (24.4)	74.9 (23.8)	68.1 (20.1)	56.2 (13.4)	44.4 (6.9)	35.6 (2.0)	54.7 (12.6)
Mean daily minimum °F (°C)	23.1 (−4.9)	25.8 (−3.4)	33.8 (1.0)	43.7 (6.5)	53.7 (12.1)	62.1 (16.7)	65.9 (18.8)	64.6 (18.1)	57.3 (14.1)	45.7 (7.6)	35.1 (1.7)	27.9 (−2.3)	44.9 (7.2)
Mean minimum °F (°C)	0.1 (−17.7)	6.5 (−14.2)	14.8 (−9.6)	26.7 (−2.9)	36.6 (2.6)	49.2 (9.6)	55.9 (13.3)	54.6 (12.6)	42.5 (5.8)	29.8 (−1.2)	19.0 (−7.2)	9.1 (−12.7)	−2.7 (−19.3)
Record low °F (°C)	−25 (−32)	−17 (−27)	−11 (−24)	15 (−9)	27 (−3)	39 (4)	47 (8)	43 (6)	31 (−1)	16 (−9)	0 (−18)	−20 (−29)	−25 (−32)
Average precipitation inches (mm)	3.30 (84)	3.17 (81)	4.16 (106)	4.53 (115)	4.67 (119)	4.75 (121)	3.83 (97)	3.43 (87)	3.11 (79)	3.35 (85)	3.23 (82)	3.73 (95)	45.26 (1,150)
Average snowfall inches (cm)	7.7 (20)	6.7 (17)	3.4 (8.6)	0.4 (1.0)	0.0 (0.0)	0.0 (0.0)	0.0 (0.0)	0.0 (0.0)	0.0 (0.0)	0.2 (0.51)	0.8 (2.0)	4.1 (10)	23.3 (59)
Average extreme snow depth inches (cm)	3.5 (8.9)	3.4 (8.6)	2.0 (5.1)	0.2 (0.51)	0.0 (0.0)	0.0 (0.0)	0.0 (0.0)	0.0 (0.0)	0.0 (0.0)	0.1 (0.25)	0.4 (1.0)	2.0 (5.1)	6.0 (15)
Average precipitation days (≥ 0.01 in)	13.2	12.0	12.5	13.1	13.5	11.8	11.0	8.9	8.3	8.7	10.3	12.4	135.7
Average snowy days (≥ 0.1 in)	6.7	5.9	2.7	0.6	0.0	0.0	0.0	0.0	0.0	0.1	1.1	4.6	21.7
Average relative humidity (%)	72.2	70.1	67.0	62.8	66.9	69.2	71.5	72.3	72.7	69.2	71.0	73.8	69.9
Average dew point °F (°C)	19.9 (−6.7)	22.5 (−5.3)	31.3 (−0.4)	39.6 (4.2)	50.5 (10.3)	59.7 (15.4)	64.2 (17.9)	63.0 (17.2)	56.7 (13.7)	43.7 (6.5)	34.7 (1.5)	25.5 (−3.6)	42.6 (5.9)
Mean monthly sunshine hours	120.8	128.4	170.1	211.0	249.9	275.5	277.0	261.5	234.4	188.8	118.7	99.3	2,335.4
Percentage possible sunshine	40	43	46	53	56	62	61	62	63	55	39	34	52
Average ultraviolet index	2	3	5	6	8	9	9	8	7	4	2	2	5
Source 1: NOAA (relative humidity and sun 1961–1990)
Source 2: Weather Atlas (UV)

== Demographics ==
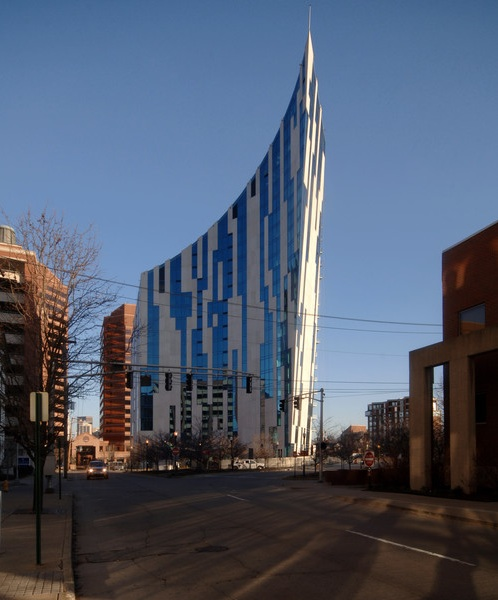
The Ascent at Roebling's Bridge

Historical population
Census	Pop.	Note	%±
1830	743		—
1840	2,026		172.7%
1850	9,408		364.4%
1860	16,471		75.1%
1870	24,505		48.8%
1880	29,720		21.3%
1890	37,371		25.7%
1900	42,938		14.9%
1910	53,270		24.1%
1920	57,121		7.2%
1930	65,252		14.2%
1940	62,018		−5.0%
1950	64,452		3.9%
1960	60,376		−6.3%
1970	52,535		−13.0%
1980	49,585		−5.6%
1990	43,264		−12.7%
2000	43,370		0.2%
2010	40,640		−6.3%
2020	40,961		0.8%
2025 (est.)	41,847		2.2%
U.S. Decennial Census

=== 2020 census ===
As of the 2020 census, Covington had a population of 40,961 and a population density of 3,103.8 people per square mile (1,198.4/km^{2}).

The median age was 35.7 years; 22.1% of residents were under the age of 18, 64.6% were 18 to 64, and 13.3% were 65 years of age or older. For every 100 females there were 98.7 males, and for every 100 females age 18 and over there were 97.2 males age 18 and over.

99.8% of residents lived in urban areas, while 0.2% lived in rural areas.

There were 18,099 households, of which 24.6% had children under the age of 18 living in them. Of all households, 27.7% were married-couple households, 27.3% were households with a male householder and no spouse or partner present, and 34.3% were households with a female householder and no spouse or partner present. About 40.3% of all households were made up of individuals and 11.8% had someone living alone who was 65 years of age or older. The average household size was 2.21 and the average family size was 2.99.

There were 20,576 housing units, of which 12.0% were vacant. The homeowner vacancy rate was 2.3% and the rental vacancy rate was 8.6%.

Racial composition as of the 2020 census
Race	Number	Percent
White	30,998	75.7%
Black or African American	4,740	11.6%
American Indian and Alaska Native	204	0.5%
Asian	252	0.6%
Native Hawaiian and Other Pacific Islander	49	0.1%
Some other race	1,519	3.7%
Two or more races	3,199	7.8%
Hispanic or Latino (of any race)	2,868	7.0%

=== 2016–2020 American Community Survey ===
According to the U.S. Census American Community Survey, for the period 2016–2020 the estimated median annual income for a household in the city was $47,917, and the median income for a family was $60,224. About 23.9% of the population were living below the poverty line, including 37.9% of those under age 18 and 14.6% of those age 65 or over. About 61.8% of the population were employed.

=== 2000 census ===
As of the census of 2000, 43,370 people, 18,257 households, and 10,132 families resided in the city. The population density was 3,301.3 inhabitants per square mile (1,274.6/km^{2}). The 20,448 housing units averaged 1,556.5 per square mile (600.8/km^{2}). The racial makeup of the city was 87.05% White, 10.14% African American, 0.24% Native American, 0.34% Asian, 0.03% Pacific Islander, 0.63% from other races, and 1.57% from two or more races. Hispanics or Latinos of any race were 1.38% of the population.

Of the 18,257 households, 28.8% had children under the age of 18 living with them, 34.3% were married couples living together, 16.5% had a female householder with no husband present, and 44.5% were not families; 36.5% of all households were made up of individuals, and 12.0% had someone living alone who was 65 years of age or older. The average household size was 2.31 and the average family size was 3.08.

The age distribution was 25.9% under the age of 18, 10.0% from 18 to 24, 33.3% from 25 to 44, 19.0% from 45 to 64, and 11.9% who were 65 years of age or older. The median age was 33 years. For every 100 females, there were 95.9 males. For every 100 females age 18 and over, there were 92.0 males.

The median income for a household in the city was $30,735, and the median income for a family was $38,307. Males had a median income of $31,238 versus $24,487 for females. The per capita income for the city was $16,841. About 15.5% of families and 18.4% of the population were below the poverty line, including 25.0% of those under age 18 and 13.4% of those age 65 or over.

Covington has some of the least expensive real estate in Kentucky; the median house price in Covington is around $95,430, while the median house price for Kentucky as a whole is $124,100.

== Economy ==
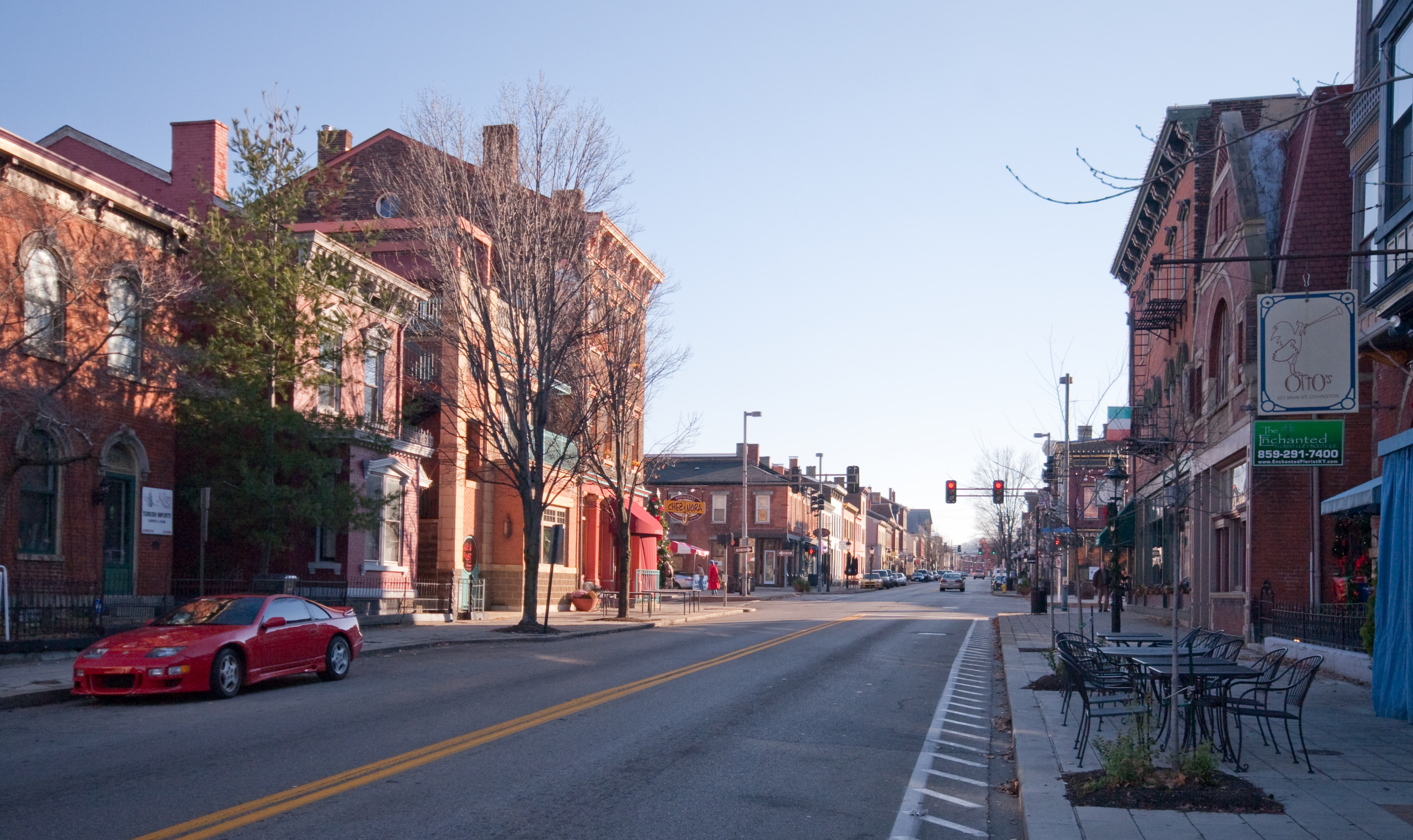
MainStrasse Village

According to Covington's 2019 Comprehensive Annual Financial Report, the principal employers in the city are:

#	Employer	# of Employees
1	Internal Revenue Service - partially closed in 2019	3,951
2	Fidelity Investments	2,069
3	Club Chef	1,039
4	Covington Board of Education	914
5	Crown Services Inc.	524
6	Rosedale Manor	488
7	State of Kentucky	477
8	St. Elizabeth Hospital	408
9	Diocese of Covington Board of Education	403
10	Atkins & Pearce Mftg	339

In September 2025, the new four-story, OneNKY Center, office and lab facility opened. The main tenant was LifeSciKY, which will operate a $15 million, 15,000-sq-ft facility with a biotech lab and incubator within the center. Beshear said, “With the opening of the center, we can support the many life sciences and biotech companies already in the region and welcome new innovators and startup companies to create more high-wage jobs and cutting-edge treatments right here in the commonwealth.”

== Arts and culture ==
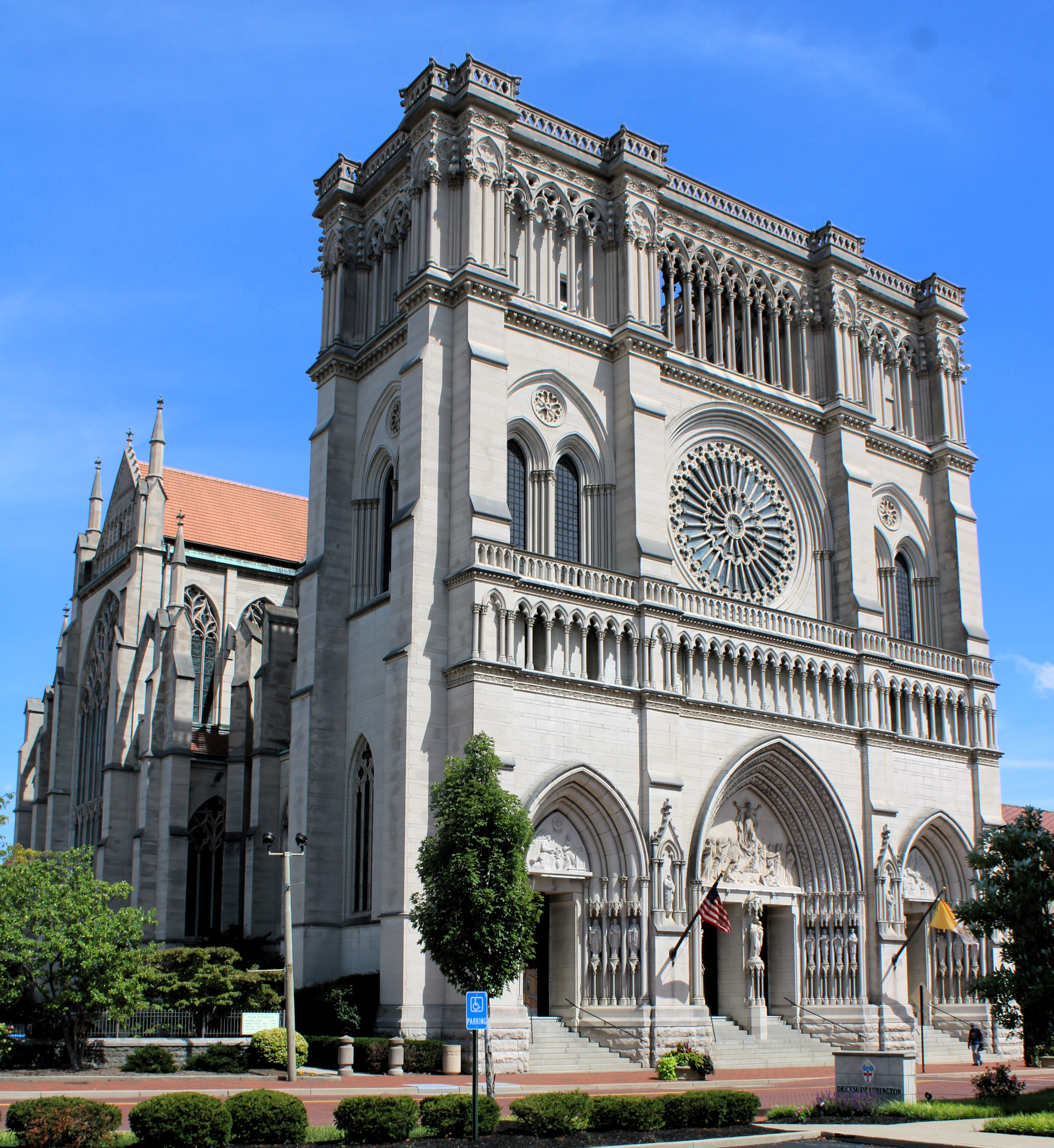
Cathedral Basilica of the Assumption, Diocese of Covington

Covington has five churches listed on the National Register of Historic Places. St. Mary's Cathedral Basilica of the Assumption is a minor basilica under the Roman Catholic Diocese of Covington. It was built in 1895 and is famous for what is said to be the world's largest handmade church stained glass window, at 67 ft × 24 ft (20.4 m × 7.3 m). The Mother of God Roman Catholic Church is a historic German church built in 1869 and included in the Mutter Gottes Historic District. The church features twin renaissance towers and murals by Vatican artist Johann Schmitt. St. Augustine Church Complex is another German parish constructed in 1913. Holy Cross Church and School Complex-Latonia was constructed between 1906 and 1908 with the elementary school added in 1914, rectory in 1924, the high school in 1930 and the convent in 1941. Trinity Episcopal Church was constructed between 1857 and 1859.

The Daniel Carter Beard Boyhood Home is a National Historic Landmark located in the Riverside Drive Historic District. The home was built in 1821 and is one of the two oldest buildings in Kenton County. Daniel Carter Beard, a founder of the Boy Scouts of America, grew up here in the mid-19th century.

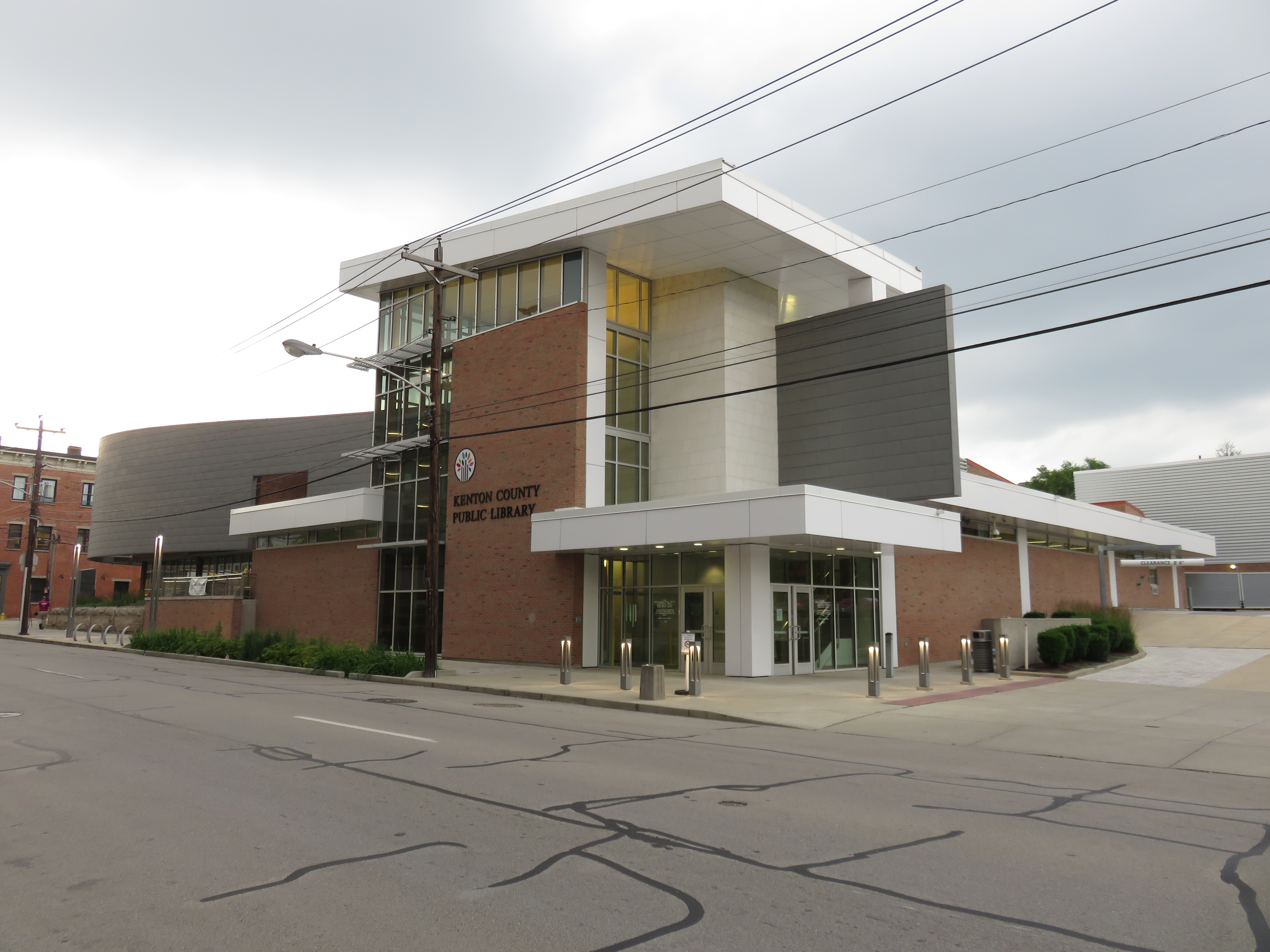
Kenton County Library

Behringer-Crawford Museum

Former Carnegie Library

== Government ==
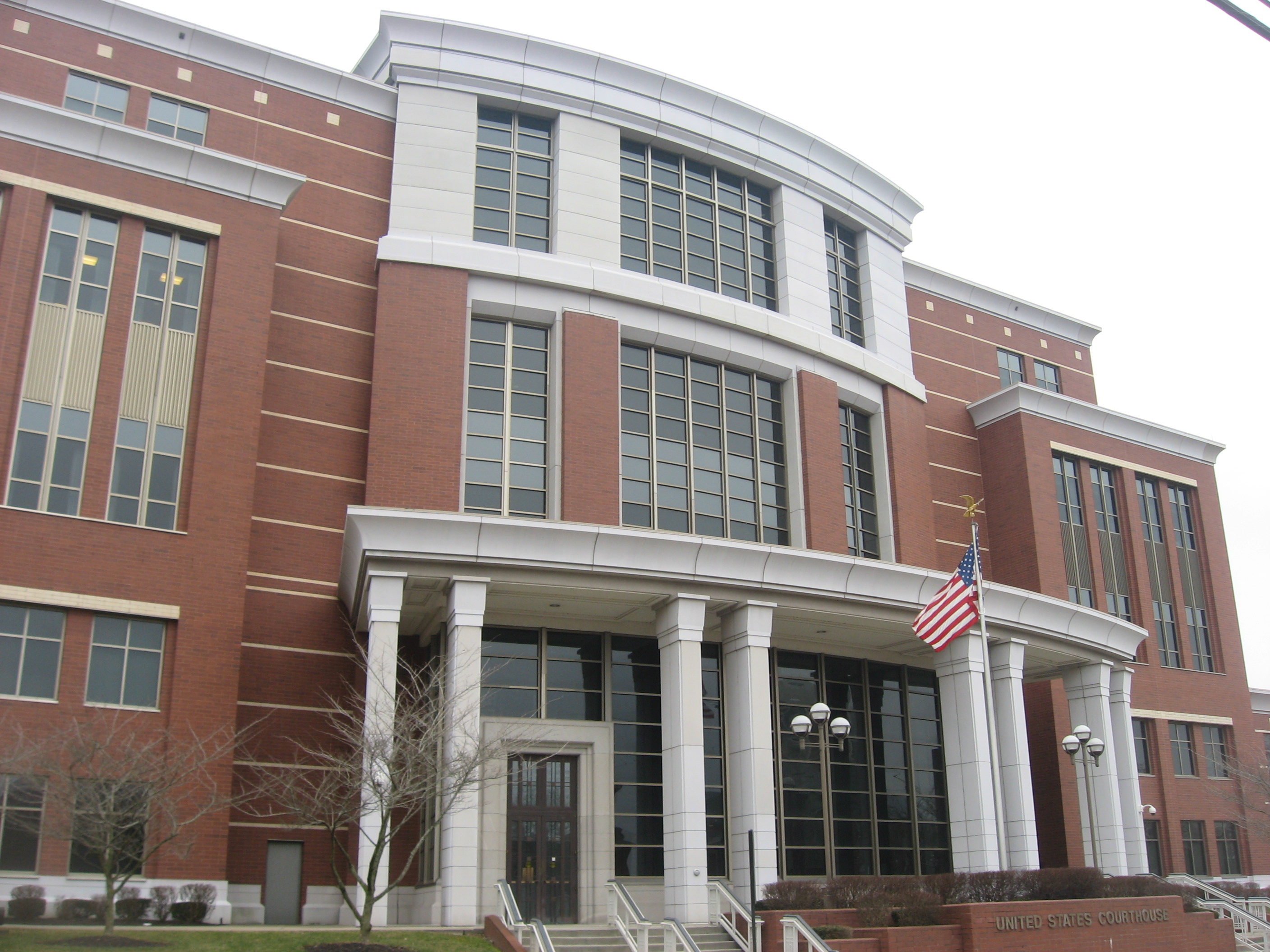
U.S. Courthouse in Covington

Covington is a home-rule class city. As of 2026, Ron Washington is the mayor of Covington, having been elected in 2024 after serving four years on the Covington Board of Commissioners. Washington made history by being the first African-American mayor of Covington. Covington is served by a four-member Board of Commissioners.

As of 2026, Covington is represented in the Kentucky General Assembly by Christian McDaniel (R) and Shelly Funke Frommeyer (R) of the 23rd and 24th districts in the Kentucky Senate, and by Kim Banta (R), Kimberly Poore Moser (R), and Stephanie Dietz (R) of the 63rd, 64th and 65th districts in the House of Representatives. Federally, Covington is located in Kentucky's 4th congressional district, represented in the 119th United States Congress by Congressman Thomas Massie (R)

The United States District Court for the Eastern District of Kentucky maintains a divisional office in Covington. The Kenton County Fiscal Court also maintains a courthouse in Covington, where it meets monthly.

== Education ==
Public education within much of Covington is provided by Covington Independent Public Schools, the largest independent school district in Kentucky. Its high school, Holmes Junior/Senior High School, is the oldest public high school in the state.

Southern portions of the city are in the Kenton County School District.

The Roman Catholic Diocese of Covington operates two high schools in the city, Covington Latin School and Holy Cross High School. Two Catholic high schools, the all-boys' Covington Catholic High School and all-girls' Notre Dame Academy, moved to neighboring Park Hills in the 1950s. Calvary Christian School, a Baptist school, is also located in Covington.

== Media ==
The Kentucky Educational Television station for Northern Kentucky, WCVN-TV (channel 54), is licensed to Covington, along with gospel station WCVG (1320 AM).

== Infrastructure ==
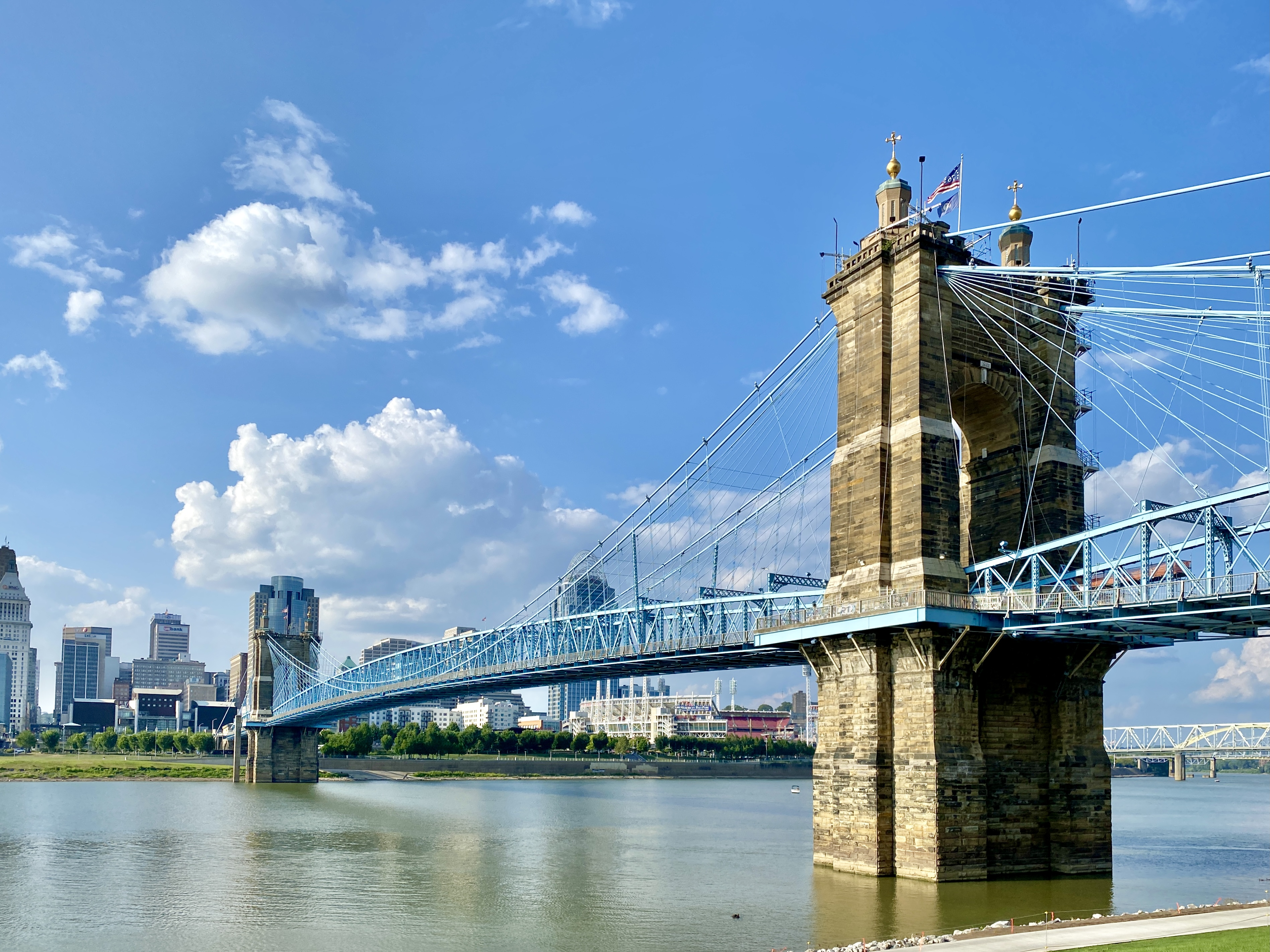
John A. Roebling Suspension Bridge

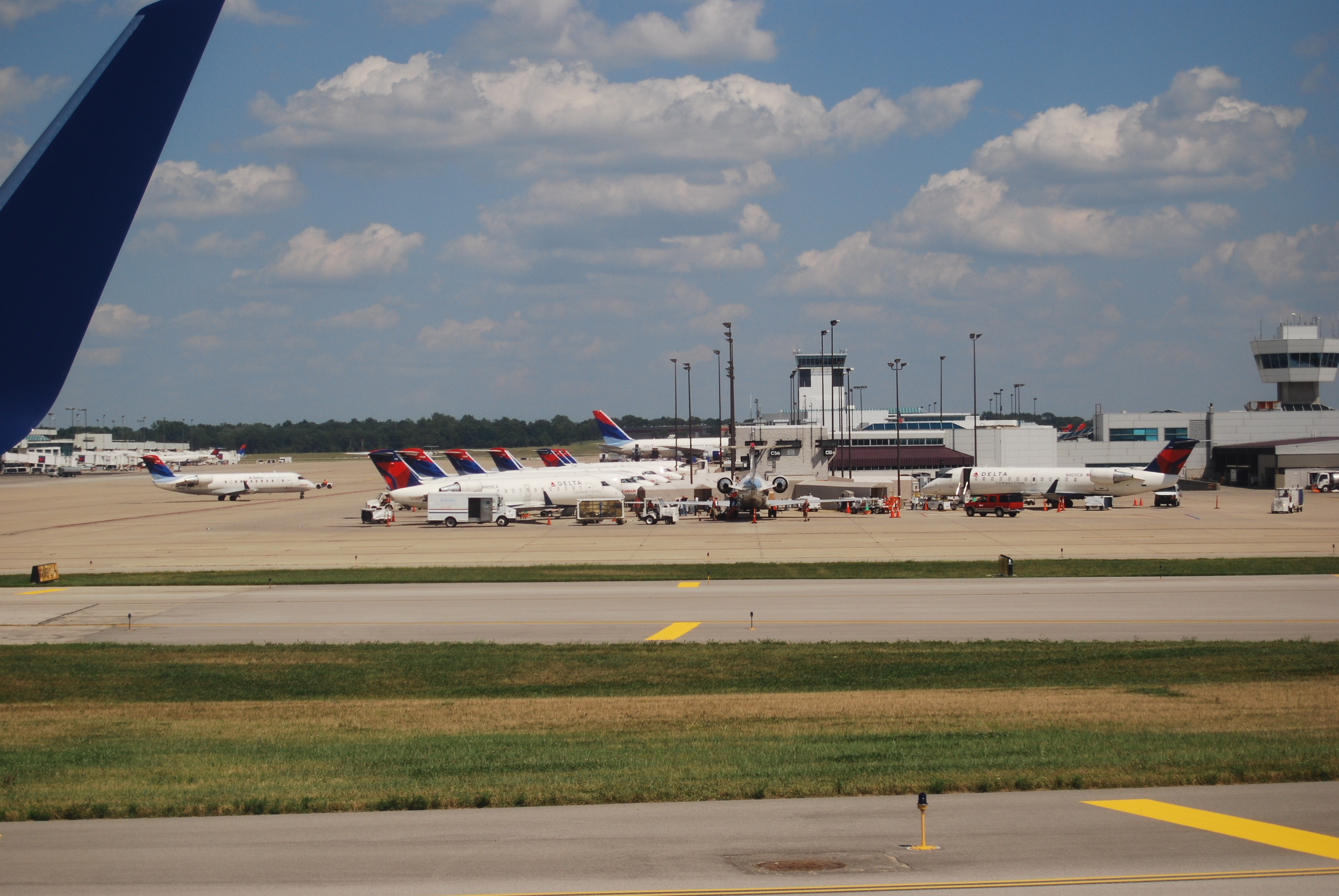
Cincinnati/Northern Kentucky International Airport

=== Transportation ===
U.S. Route 25, Interstate 71 and Interstate 75 serve downtown Covington.

Bus transit is served by the Transit Authority of Northern Kentucky (TANK).

Covington Union Station served Chesapeake and Ohio and Louisville and Nashville passenger trains into the 1960s. The final train making stops at the station was the L&N's Pan-American (Cincinnati-New Orleans) in 1971. The L&N's Humming Bird (Cincinnati- Memphis and New Orleans) also served the station. C&O trains included the Fast Flying Virginian, George Washington and Sportsman. The C&O dropped Union Station from its trains' itineraries in 1966.

Covington is served by Cincinnati/Northern Kentucky International Airport (CVG), which is the largest airport in the state. The airport is one of DHL Aviation's three superhubs, serving destinations throughout the Americas, Europe, Africa, and Asia, making it the fifth-busiest airport in the U.S. based on cargo operations. CVG also serves as a focus city for Allegiant Air and is the airline's largest O&D airport. The airport additionally serves as an operating base for Delta Air Lines subsidiary Endeavor Air and Frontier Airlines as well as a maintenance base for American Airlines subsidiary PSA Airlines. In January 2026, Minneapolis–based Sun Country Airlines opened an operating base at the airport.

The 1936 Licking River Bridge, the main connector between Covington and Newport, is scheduled to be torn down and replaced. Starting in the spring of 2026, the Licking River Bridge, will be demolished and rebuilt over a two-year construction period. The new bridge is expected to open in the summer of 2028. The 12th Street Bridge will temporarily become the main connector between Covington and Newport.

In late 2022, funding was settled for the Brent Spence Bridge Corridor Project, which will construct a new double-deck companion bridge to carry interstate through-traffic, while the existing Brent Spence Bridge will be reconfigured for local traffic only, through Cincinnati and Covington. Approximately eight miles of improved roadways spanning Kentucky and Ohio will be constructed. The total project cost is estimated at $3.6 billion, and a federal grant of $1.6 billion was awarded in late 2022 to the project, with the remaining cost evenly split between Ohio and Kentucky. Major construction is expected to begin in 2026. Beshear said there will be no tolls.

=== Law enforcement ===
In 1817, the Town of Covington created the position "Captain of Patrol", and assigned two "Patrollers" under his supervision. The patrol area included the Town and eight miles of surrounding territory. In 1833 the first full time Town Marshall was appointed. An act of the Kentucky General Assembly in 1834 incorporated Covington as a city, and in 1842, the City of Covington appointed its first "Police Commissioner". Covington City Ordinance created the "Voluntary Night Watch" in 1843, which consisted of seventy-one reputable persons invested with police authority. In 1856 a regular citizen's police force was established. The department is staffed by 114 sworn officers, each assigned to one of 4 bureaus. There are substations, and a central headquarters. The department maintains accreditation through the Kentucky Association of Chiefs of Police as well as the Commission on Accreditation for Law Enforcement Agencies.

=== Fire protection ===
The Covington Fire Department was created on June 30, 1864. Since 1918, the Covington Fire Department has been represented by Covington Professional Firefighters Local 38, a member union of the International Association of Firefighters. Covington FD was a charter member of the IAFF.

== Notable people ==
- Mike Battaglia, NBC Sports analyst and long-time Kentucky Derby announcer, was born in Latonia
- Gary Bauer (born 1946), former Republican presidential hopeful, was born in Covington
- Daniel Carter Beard (1850–1941), writer, youth leader, and artist; his life-sized bronze statue, created by sculptor Kenneth Bradford, stands in town
- Adrian Belew (born 1949), musician, vocalist and guitarist of King Crimson since early 1980s, was born in Covington
- Mortimer Murrey Benton (1807–1885), Covington's first mayor
- Jake Bergey (born 1974), former professional lacrosse player, was born in Covington
- Harry Berte (1872–1952), a Major League Baseball infielder
- Gail Borden, inventor of condensed milk, lived in Covington during his childhood
- Chuck Bradley (born 1970), football player
- Sydney Butchkes (1922–2015), American artist, and designer
- Mary Jane Goodson Carlisle (1835–1905), wife of politician John G. Carlisle
- Steve Cauthen, U.S. Racing Hall of Fame jockey, was born in Covington.
- Jamour Chames, visual artist, was born in Covington.
- Bob Charles, Australian politician, member of the Australian House of Representatives, was born in Covington.
- Martha Jane Knowlton Coray, the first female member of the Brigham Young Academy Board of Trustees, was born in Covington.
- Byrd Spilman Dewey, author and Florida pioneer
- Asa Drury, educator, Baptist minister, and first superintendent of Covington Public Schools
- Frank Duveneck, realist painter, was born in Covington
- Mitch English, national television personality, a host of The Daily Buzz also featured in theatrical releases and other television programs, was born in Covington
- Henry Forrest, U.S. Racing Hall of Fame Thoroughbred racehorse trainer, was born in Covington
- Frederick William Franz, religious leader and theologian, fourth president of the Jehovah's Witnesses, was born in Covington
- Wallace A. Gaines (1858–1940) American businessman, funeral director, and political figure
- Loyd Gentry Jr., Thoroughbred racehorse trainer, born in Covington
- Haven Gillespie, songwriter, remembered primarily for "Santa Claus Is Coming to Town", was born in Covington.
- Rickard D. Gwydir, Superintendent of Public Works and city auditor (19th century)
- Joe Heving, Major League Baseball player
- Daniel Henry Holmes, businessman and founder of D.H. Holmes in 1849 in New Orleans; department store was largest in South at his death; he built Holmesdale, a 32-room mansion, in Covington and lived here part-time.
- David Justice, Major League Baseball player, graduated from Covington Latin School.
- Durward Kirby, television personality, best known as co-host of Candid Camera, was born in Covington.
- Jared Lorenzen, professional football quarterback, backup to Eli Manning for Super Bowl XLII champion New York Giants, was born in Covington.
- Clarence Lushbaugh - pathologist and radiobiologist at Los Alamos National Laboratory and Oak Ridge Associated Universities
- Randy Marsh, Major League Baseball umpire, graduated from Covington Holmes High School.
- Una Merkel, film and Tony Award-winning stage actress, was born in Covington.
- Lee Roy Reams, Broadway actor, was born in Covington.
- George Remus, lawyer and bootlegger during the Prohibition era.
- Jack Roush, champion NASCAR owner of Roush Fenway Racing team, was born in Covington.
- Pat Scott, All-American Girls Professional Baseball League pitcher, was born in Covington.
- Robert F. Schulkers, writer of children's books, was born in Covington
- William Wright Southgate, northern Kentucky Congressman
- Dorothy Spencer, film editor, four-time Oscar nominee, was born in Covington.
- John W. Stevenson, Governor and Senator of Kentucky
- Mary Florence Taney (1856–1936), socialite, writer, and clubwoman
- Tom Thacker, NCAA and NBA champion basketball player, top pick of 1963 NBA draft, was born in Covington.
- Paul Walther, professional basketball player, was born in Covington.
- Bernart T. Wisenall, architect, lived in Covington.
- Ron Ziegler, White House Press Secretary during President Richard Nixon's administration, was born in Covington.

== See also ==
- List of cities and towns along the Ohio River
- Carneal House
- Covington Kids
