= Kentucky Route 338 =

State highway in Kentucky, United States

Kentucky Route 338
- KY 338 highlighted in red

Route information
- Maintained by KYTC
- Length: 32.228 mi (51.866 km)

Major junctions
- South end: US 25 in Richwood
- I-71 / I-75 near Richwood US 42 / US 127 near Beaverlick; KY 536 near Rabbit Hash KY 18 near Belleview and in Burlington
- North end: KY 20 in Idlewild

Location
- Country: United States
- State: Kentucky
- Counties: Boone

Highway system
- Kentucky State Highway System; Interstate; US; State; Parkways
← KY 337	→ KY 339

Kentucky Route 338 (KY 338) is a 32.228-mile-long (51.866 km) state highway in Kentucky. It begins at KY 20 in Northern Boone County. It goes through Burlington, Kentucky where it intersects with KY 18. It then goes to a small town called Rabbit Hash, Kentucky where it intersects with KY 536 and again with KY 18. After it leaves Rabbit Hash, it runs by Big Bone Lick State Park before intersecting with U.S. Route 42 (US 42) and US 127 near Union. It turns left onto US 42 and US 127, and then leaves the concurrency about mile north. KY 338 then travels to Richwood, where it has access to Interstate 75 (I-75) and I-71 it ends about 1/4 mile east of the interstate at US 25.

== Major Junctions ==
The entire route is in Boone County.

Location	mi	km	Destinations	Notes
Richwood	0.000	0.000	US 25 (Dixie Highway)	Southern terminus
Richwood	0.188	0.303	I-71 / I-75 north	Exit 175 from northbound I-71/I-75 and ramp to northbound I-71/I-75
Richwood	0.360	0.579	I-71 / I-75 south	Exit 175 from southbound I-71/I-75 and ramp to southbound I-71/I-75
Richwood	2.092	3.367	KY 2951 south (Chambers Road)	
Beaverlick	4.613	7.424	US 42 / US 127 north	South end of US 42/US 127 overlap
Beaverlick	5.161	8.306	US 42 / US 127 south / KY 1292 east (Beaver Road)	North end of US 42/US 127 overlap. Western terminus of KY 1292
Big Bone	7.600	12.231	KY 1925 south (Boat Dock Road)	Big Bone Lick State Park
	10.643	17.128	KY 2852 north (Riddles Run Road)	
Rabbit Hash	16.192	26.058	KY 536 east (Rabbit Hash Hill Road)	Western terminus of KY 536. Rabbit Hash Hill Road continues slightly further west into Rabbit Hash.
	16.837	27.097	KY 18 east (McVille Road)	Western terminus of KY 18
Burlington	26.516	42.673	KY 18 (Burlington Pike)	Union Square
Idlewild	32.228	51.866	KY 20 (Petersburg Road)	Northern terminus
1.000 mi = 1.609 km; 1.000 km = 0.621 mi: Concurrency terminus
