= Kentucky Route 18 =

State highway in Kentucky, United States

Kentucky Route 18
- KY 18 highlighted in red

Route information
- Maintained by KYTC
- Length: 16.632 mi (26.767 km)

Major junctions
- West end: KY 338 in Rabbit Hash
- KY 20 in Belleview; KY 338 in Burlington; KY 237 in Burlington; KY 842 in Florence; I-71 / I-75 in Florence
- East end: KY 1017 in Florence

Location
- Country: United States
- State: Kentucky
- Counties: Boone

Highway system
- Kentucky State Highway System; Interstate; US; State; Parkways
← KY 17	→ KY 19

Kentucky Route 18 (KY 18), also known as Burlington Pike, is a state highway that serves as a major road through Florence and Burlington in the U.S. state of Kentucky. The western terminus of the route is at KY 338 in Rabbit Hash. The eastern terminus is at KY 1017 in Florence.

== Route description ==
It begins at KY 338 (East Bend Road) in the small hamlet of Rabbit Hash and travels north along the Ohio River to the small town of Belleview. In Belleview, KY 20 splits off KY 18 and heads north, as KY 18 turns east toward Burlington. KY 18 passes through Burlington as a residential road, until its intersection with KY 338, where it becomes less residential and more commercial. A couple miles east, KY 18 intersects with KY 237 (Camp Ernst Road heading south and North Bend Road heading north). The large church First Church of Christ sits on the corner of KY 18 and Camp Ernst Road (KY 237). KY 18 continues east, still as a mostly commercial road. At its busiest point, KY 18 intersects with KY 842 (Houston Road to the north and Hopeful Church Road to the south). Continuing east, KY 18 spurs off Mall Road, a commercial road holding much of the commerce in the city of Florence, including the Florence Mall. Mall Road also connects KY 18 with U.S. 42/U.S. 127, although the southbound onramp to I-71/75 does not provide any direct access to U.S. 42; the onramp parallels the interstate until it is south of U.S. 42. East of I-71/I-75, KY 18 turns slightly north in its final couple miles. Boone County High School is located along KY 18 less than a mile before its eastern terminus, at KY 1017 (Turfway Road).

== Major intersections ==
The entire route is in Boone County.

Location	mi	km	Destinations	Notes
	0.000	0.000	KY 338 (East Bend Road)	
Belleview	3.502	5.636	KY 20 east (Belleview Road) to I-275 – Petersburg	
Burlington	10.443	16.806	KY 338 (Jefferson Street / Idlewild Road / East Bend Road)	
	11.510	18.524	KY 237 (Camp Ernst Road/North Bend Road) to I-275 – Union, Hebron	interchange
Limaburg	12.580	20.246	Limaburg Road	former KY 3168 north
	12.957	20.852	KY 1017 east (Aero Parkway)	
Florence	14.630	23.545	KY 842 (Houston Road / Hopeful Church Road)	
Florence	14.748	23.735	Mall Road	former KY 3157 south; access to Florence Mall
Florence	14.977– 15.102	24.103– 24.304	I-71 / I-75 – Cincinnati, Richwood, Lexington, Louisville	I-71/I-75 exit 181
Florence	16.632	26.767	KY 1017 (Turfway Road) to US 25	
1.000 mi = 1.609 km; 1.000 km = 0.621 mi
