= Kentucky Route 1017 =

State highway in Kentucky, United States

Kentucky Route 1017
- KY 1017 highlighted in red

Route information
- Maintained by KYTC
- Length: 3.984 mi (6.412 km)

Major junctions
- West end: KY 18 near Limaburg
- I-71 / I-75 in Florence; KY 18 in Florence
- East end: US 25 / US 42 / US 127 in Florence

Location
- Country: United States
- State: Kentucky
- Counties: Boone

Highway system
- Kentucky State Highway System; Interstate; US; State; Parkways
← KY 1016	→ KY 1018

Kentucky Route 1017 (KY 1017) is an 3.984-mile-long (6.412 km) state highway in Boone County, Kentucky. The route runs between KY 18 and Oakbrook Drive southeast of Limaburg and east-southeast of Burlington, to U.S. Route 25 (US 25), US 42, and US 127 in northern Florence. The route principally connects the recent commercial developments of northern Florence south of the Cincinnati/Northern Kentucky International Airport, as well as Turfway Park and northbound Interstate 71 (I-71) and I-75.

== Route description ==
KY 1017 begins at KY 18 and Oakbrook Drive just to the southeast of Limaburg. The route begins as Aero Parkway, and it was constructed in order to serve the developing commercial areas near the airport. As it meanders its way eastward, it straddles the area between Florence city limits and the airport, intersecting with Ted Bushelman Boulevard (KY 3159), which connects southward to KY 842 (Houston Road).

Southeast of runway 36R at the airport, KY 1017 intersects KY 717, running concurrently and picking up KY 717's local name of Turfway Road. The road then enters the city of Florence proper, and after a very short jot, KY 717 splits to the southwest as Thoroughbred Boulevard. At the same intersection is the gate 2 entrance to Turfway Park. The route then intersects KY 842 proper before heading beneath I-71 and I-75, providing access to and from the northbound lanes.

Immediately after the I-71/I-75 ramps, KY 1017 meets the eastern terminus of KY 18 (Burlington Pike), as well as Curtis Avenue. The route continues a short distance before terminating at Dixie Highway (US 25, US 42, and US 127), Main Street, and Rose Avenue just north of downtown Florence.

== History ==
Prior to 2014, KY 1017 had a much different routing than present day. It originally ran generally north–south up from Dixie Highway. Instead of running from KY 18 to KY 717 via Aero Parkway, it instead came up from Dixie Highway and followed present-day KY 717 (Turfway Road) northeastward toward Kenton County, intersecting with KY 236 on the east-southeast side of the airport. The route continued across the Kenton County line, crossing over I-275 and coming to present day KY 3076 (Dolwick Drive). Prior to 2004, the route turned and ran along Dolwick Drive to Mineola Pike, where it ended at KY 3076. However, for the next decade following, the route was truncated to the present-day northern terminus of KY 717; KY 3076 replaced KY 1017 between Turfway and Mineola Pike. All of this was changed in 2014, when KY 1017 was rerouted along its present route and KY 717 replaced it.

== Major intersections ==
The entire route is in Boone County.

Location	mi	km	Destinations	Notes
	0.000	0.000	KY 18 / Oakbrook Drive	Western terminus; roadway continues as Oakbrook Drive
	1.741	2.802	KY 3159 south (Ted Bushelman Boulevard)	Northern terminus of KY 3159
	2.297	3.697	KY 717 north (Turfway Road)	Western end of KY 717 concurrency
Florence	2.549	4.102	KY 717 south (Thoroughbred Boulevard) / Turfway Park	Eastern end of KY 717 concurrency
Florence	2.852	4.590	KY 842 (Houston Road) to I-71 south / I-75 south – Lexington, Louisville	Destinations and hospital signed eastbound only
Florence	3.210	5.166	I-71 north / I-75 north – Cincinnati	Access to and from I-71/I-75 northbound only; I-71/I-75 exit 182; Cincinnati signed eastbound only
Florence	3.359	5.406	KY 18 west (Burlington Pike) / Curtis Avenue	Eastern terminus of KY 18
Florence	3.984	6.412	US 25 / US 42 / US 127 (Dixie Highway) / Main Street / Rose Avenue	Eastern terminus
1.000 mi = 1.609 km; 1.000 km = 0.621 mi: Concurrency terminus
