= Francisville, Kentucky =

Census-designated place in Kentucky, United States

- Census-designated place (CDP)
- Location within Boone County and the state of Kentucky
- Coordinates: 39°06′24″N 84°43′40″W
- Country: United States
- State: Kentucky
- County: Boone

Area
  - Total: 8.48 sq mi (21.97 km^{2})
  - Land: 8.48 sq mi (21.97 km^{2})
  - Water: 0 sq mi (0.00 km^{2})
- Elevation: 810 ft (250 m)

Population (2020)
  - Total: 9,952
  - Density: 1,173.2/sq mi (452.99/km^{2})
- Time zone: UTC-5 (Eastern (EST))
  - Summer (DST): UTC-4 (EDT)
- Area code: 859
- GNIS feature ID: 2629618

Francisville is a census-designated place (CDP) in Boone County, Kentucky, United States, and a suburb of Greater Cincinnati. Its population was 9,952 as of the 2020 census. Francisville shares ZIP code 41048 with the neighboring CDP of Hebron. It is the northernmost community in the state.

== History ==
Francisville was founded in 1819, when 77 members of the Bullitsburg Baptist Church decided to establish a church closer to their homes. The Sand Run Baptist Church was built for a cost of $2100. A post office, general store, school, hotel, and tobacco warehouse soon developed around the church.

== Culture ==
=== Media ===
Francisville is served by one daily newspaper, The Kentucky Enquirer (an edition of The Cincinnati Enquirer), and by one weekly newspaper, The Boone County Recorder. Francisville is also served by twelve television stations and many radio stations as part of the Greater Cincinnati media market.

== Geography ==
Francisville is located in northern Boone County, on the southwestern side of the Cincinnati Metropolitan Area. Interstate 275, the beltway around Cincinnati, forms the southern edge of the CDP, with the community of Hebron to the south of I-275. Francisville extends to the north as far as Kentucky Route 8 (River Road) in the Ohio River valley. Kentucky Route 237 (North Bend Road) is the main road through Francisville, extending from KY 8 south to I-275 and beyond into Hebron and Burlington. The entrance to Cincinnati/Northern Kentucky International Airport is located 4 miles (6 km) southeast of Francisville.

According to the U.S. Census Bureau, Francisville has an area of 8.5 square miles (22.0 km^{2}), all of it land.

Francisville and Hebron have been experiencing aggressive residential, commercial and business growth. In Francisville the growth is focused along Kentucky Route 237 throughout the southern and central parts of the CDP. The Francisville area is sometimes referred to as the North Bend for its location in the bend of the Ohio River that forms the northernmost geographic area in the state of Kentucky.

Along Kentucky Route 237, 12 subdivisions have recently been under construction, and 2,855 homes have been approved but not yet built. More than 1,100 homes have been built in those subdivisions, according to the Boone County Planning Commission. The developments include the neighborhoods (from south to north) of Cardinal Cove, Parlor Grove, Settlers Point, Treetops, Thornwilde, Wyndemere, Deer Creek, Rivershore Farms, Northpointe, Taylor Ridge and Conway Hills.

Beginning in autumn 2007, Kentucky Route 237 underwent a $19 million rerouting and improvement including widening the road to five lanes from Litton Lane south of Interstate 275 to Cardinal Way. The road is now three lanes from Cardinal Way to just north of North Pointe Elementary School. The improvement features two roundabouts (the second and third of their type in northern Kentucky). One is located at Cardinal Way, the other at the intersection of Graves Road and Old North Bend Road. The project also yielded bike lanes and an 8-foot-wide (2.4 m) pedestrian path. As part of the KY 237 realignment, a TANK Park and Ride facility is located on the west side of the roundabout with Cardinal Way.

== Demographics ==
Historical population
Census	Pop.	Note	%±
2020	9,952		—
U.S. Decennial Census

=== 2020 census ===
As of the 2020 census, Francisville had a population of 9,952. The median age was 37.3 years. 31.6% of residents were under the age of 18 and 10.2% of residents were 65 years of age or older. For every 100 females there were 99.0 males, and for every 100 females age 18 and over there were 99.2 males age 18 and over.

100.0% of residents lived in urban areas, while 0.0% lived in rural areas.

There were 3,184 households in Francisville, of which 49.4% had children under the age of 18 living in them. Of all households, 75.2% were married-couple households, 9.2% were households with a male householder and no spouse or partner present, and 11.8% were households with a female householder and no spouse or partner present. About 11.0% of all households were made up of individuals and 3.6% had someone living alone who was 65 years of age or older.

There were 3,242 housing units, of which 1.8% were vacant. The homeowner vacancy rate was 0.4% and the rental vacancy rate was 1.1%.

Racial composition as of the 2020 census
Race	Number	Percent
White	8,736	87.8%
Black or African American	210	2.1%
American Indian and Alaska Native	17	0.2%
Asian	244	2.5%
Native Hawaiian and Other Pacific Islander	19	0.2%
Some other race	111	1.1%
Two or more races	615	6.2%
Hispanic or Latino (of any race)	326	3.3%

== Transportation ==
=== Air ===
Francisville is served by Cincinnati/Northern Kentucky International Airport (IATA: CVG, ICAO: KCVG, FAA LID: CVG) which is the hub for both Amazon Prime Air and DHL Aviation, along with focus city for Allegiant Air and Frontier Airlines.

=== Highways ===
Francisville is served by one major interstate highway. Interstate 275 is an outer-belt highway through Northern Kentucky.

It is also served by numerous state highways: Kentucky Route 237 (North Bend Road), Kentucky Route 20 (Petersburg Road), and formerly Kentucky Route 3168 (Limaburg Road).

ARTIMIS is Greater Cincinnati's interstate information service. Current highway conditions are available 24/7 locally by dialing 511. For out-of-town drivers or "511"-disabled phone systems, one can call 513-333-3333.

In 2010, work on the KY 237 bridge over I-275 finished, with additional sidewalk and storm drain work.

=== Bus service ===
Francisville is served by the Transit Authority of Northern Kentucky (TANK) which serves Northern Kentucky and operates bus links in Cincinnati at Metro's main Government Square hub.
