= Kentucky Route 236 =

Highway in Kentucky

Kentucky Route 236
- KY 236 highlighted in red

Route information
- Maintained by KYTC
- Length: 6.538 mi (10.522 km)

Major junctions
- South end: KY 1303 in Edgewood
- US 25/42/127 in Erlanger; I-71/75 in Erlanger
- North end: KY 212 near Hebron

Location
- Country: United States
- State: Kentucky
- Counties: Boone, Kenton

Highway system
- Kentucky State Highway System; Interstate; US; State; Parkways
← KY 235	→ KY 237

Kentucky Route 236 is a state highway in Boone and Kenton Counties in Northern Kentucky. The southern terminus is at KY 1303 in Edgewood. The northern terminus is at the Cincinnati/Northern Kentucky International Airport near Hebron, where it meets KY 212.

== Route description ==
KY 236 begins at an intersection with KY 1303 (Turkeyfoot Road) in Edgewood, near the border of Erlanger. The route heads northwest into Erlanger as Stevenson Road, passing through a mixed commercial and residential district. After crossing railroad tracks, the route meets U.S. Routes 25, 42, and 127 (Dixie Highway) in a commercial area. From here, KY 236 continues northeast as Commonwealth Avenue through Erlanger until it meets Interstates 71 and 75 at Exit 184A. Past this junction, the route enters unincorporated Boone County and becomes Donaldson Highway. It continues northeast until it reaches the east side of Cincinnati/Northern Kentucky International Airport, where it turns north along the side of the airport. KY 236 turns west at the northeast corner of the airport before terminating at KY 212.

== History ==
KY 236 was formed between 1950 and 1954 as a renumbering of KY 442.

The original KY 236 ran from KY 67 (at what is now KY 185 & Lake Road) northwest to the county line. This became part of KY 185 when it was extended south by 1950.

== Major intersections ==
County	Location	mi	km	Destinations	Notes
Kenton	Edgewood	0.000	0.000	KY 1303 (Turkeyfoot Road)	
Kenton	Erlanger	1.436	2.311	US 25 / US 42 / US 127 (Dixie Highway)	
Kenton	Erlanger	2.277– 2.497	3.664– 4.019	I-71 / I-75 to I-275 – Cincinnati, Lexington, Louisville	
Kenton	Erlanger	2.684	4.319	KY 842 south (Houston Road)	
Boone		3.568	5.742	KY 717 (Turfway Road)	
Boone		3.980	6.405	KY 3147 west (O'Hara Road)	
Boone		4.395	7.073	KY 3076 east (Mineoloa Pike)	
Boone		6.295	10.131	To KY 212 north (Terminal Drive) / KY 20 / I-275	Interchange
Boone		6.508	10.474	KY 236 / Terminal Drive east – Airport	interchange; 236 continues east to various airport amenities for a little over a tenth of a mile before ending
1.000 mi = 1.609 km; 1.000 km = 0.621 mi
