= Idlewild, Kentucky =

Unincorporated community in Kentucky, United States

- Unincorporated community
- Location within Kentucky
- Coordinates: 39°04′39″N 84°47′42″W
- Country: United States
- State: Kentucky
- County: Boone
- Elevation: 663 ft (202 m)
- Time zone: UTC-5 (Eastern (EST))
  - Summer (DST): UTC-4 (EDT)
- Area code: 859
- GNIS feature ID: 508308

Idlewild is an unincorporated community in Boone County, Kentucky, United States. Idlewild is located at the junction of Kentucky Routes 20 and 338, 5 miles (8.0 km) northwest of Burlington. The name "Idlewild" was adopted in 1900, and the community was formerly named Gainesville and Utzinger, respectively. The Gainesville name was based upon the Gaines family, who owned a great deal of land in Boone County. The name Utzinger was placed later, upon establishment of the community's post office in 1886.

== History ==
In the late 19th century, Idlewild had several businesses, a general store and three blacksmith shops. A carriage shop also existed, which was operated by a charter member of the Wells Fargo stage delivery route, Fred Pfalzgraf.

In the early 20th century, there were two nearby schools, one for white pupils and one for black pupils.

In the 1940s, there were only two businesses in the community's business district, the Scothorn general store and Scothorn Motors auto dealership. In 2015, the former general store building was vacant, and the Scothorn Motors building was an auto body shop.
