= Aylor =

Aylor may refer to:

- Mark Aylor (born 1978), American former rugby union flanker
- J.M. Aylor House, a historic house in Hebron, Kentucky, United States

== See also ==
- Ayler
