= Kentucky Route 237 =

Highway in Kentucky

Kentucky Route 237
- KY 237 highlighted in red

Route information
- Maintained by KYTC
- Length: 14.781 mi (23.788 km)

Major junctions
- South end: KY 536 in Florence
- US 42 / US 127 in Florence; KY 18 in Burlington; KY 20 in Hebron; I-275 in Hebron
- North end: KY 8 near Hebron

Location
- Country: United States
- State: Kentucky
- Counties: Boone

Highway system
- Kentucky State Highway System; Interstate; US; State; Parkways
← KY 236	→ KY 238

Kentucky Route 237 (KY 237) is a 14.872-mile-long (23.934 km) state highway in Boone County, Kentucky, connecting the Florence/Burlington area with Hebron. The southern terminus of the route is at KY 536 in Florence. The northern terminus is at KY 8 near Hebron. Most of the land surrounding KY 237 is residential.

== Route description ==
KY 237 begins at an intersection with KY 536 (Mount Zion Road) in Florence. The route heads to the northwest as Gunpowder Road, running along the east bank of the south fork of Gunpowder Creek to the community of Sugartit, where KY 237 intersects US 42/US 127. The road continues to the northwest as Pleasant Valley Road until it reaches Camp Ernst Road in Burlington. KY 237 turns north, running along Camp Ernst Road and passing through residential areas prior to intersecting KY 18 and becoming North Bend Road, the name KY 237 retains to its northern terminus. North of KY 18, KY 237 passes directly west of the Cincinnati-Northern Kentucky International Airport and intersects Interstate 275 northwest of the airport in Hebron. Past I-275, KY 237 heads northward through less populated areas before terminating at KY 8.

Camp Ernst Middle School is located directly on this route(Camp Ernst Rd. portion.) Stephens Elementary School and North Pointe Elementary (North Bend Rd. portion) are both located directly along this route, while a collection of other Boone County schools (Conner High School, Conner Middle School, Goodridge Elementary School and Thornewilde Elementary) are located less than a mile off this route. Several larger churches also lie along this route, including Vineyard Christian Church, Grace Fellowship (along the Gunpowder Rd. portion) and 1st Church of Christ in Burlington, at the intersection of KY 237 and KY 18.

Beginning in Autumn 2007, Kentucky Route 237 underwent a $19 Million rerouting and improvement that included widening the road to five lanes from Litton Lane south of Interstate 275 to Cardinal Way. The road was constructed with a landscaped median from Cardinal Way to the Graves Road/Old Noerth Bend Road roundabout North of this the road was straightened and improved to include two through lanes and one center-turn lane to just north of North Point Elementary School. The improvement features two roundabouts (the second and third of their type in Northern Kentucky at the time). One is located at Cardinal Drive, the other at Graves Road/Old North Bend Road. The construction also included bike lanes and an 8-foot-wide (2.4 m) pedestrian path.

On June 15, 2009, Graves Road was permanently rerouted to the new alignment. Traffic using Graves Road now must use the new roundabout to access KY 237.

Construction was completed and the new road was opened in June 2010.

== Future ==
Construction along several sections of KY 237 continued in the summer of 2012 including North Bend Road, Camp Ernst Road and Pleasant Valley Road. New turn lanes were added at the intersection of Camp Ernst Road and Rogers Lane. Construction to widen the section known as Pleasant Valley Road continues near the intersection with US 42. Construction of a SPUI interchange with KY 18 commenced with utility relocation in January, 2013.

== Major intersections ==
The entire route is in Boone County.

Location	mi	km	Destinations	Notes
Union	0.000	0.000	KY 536 (Mt. Zion Road)	
Sugartit	1.581	2.544	US 42 (US 127)	
	6.275	10.099	KY 18 to I-75	interchange
Hebron	9.047	14.560	Cougar Path	former KY 3168 south
Hebron	9.418	15.157	KY 20 (Petersburg Road)	
Francisville	10.542	16.966	I-275 to I-71 / I-75 – Lawrenceburg, Cincinnati, Airport	I-275 exit 6; formerly exit 8 until the opening of the Graves Road interchange in 2021
Francisville	11.210	18.041	KY 2846 east (Tanner Road)	
Francisville	11.733	18.882	KY 495 south (Graves Road)	Traffic circle; opened in 2022
	14.781	23.788	KY 8 east (River Road)	
1.000 mi = 1.609 km; 1.000 km = 0.621 mi
