= Anderson Ferry =

- U.S. National Register of Historic Places
- U.S. Historic district
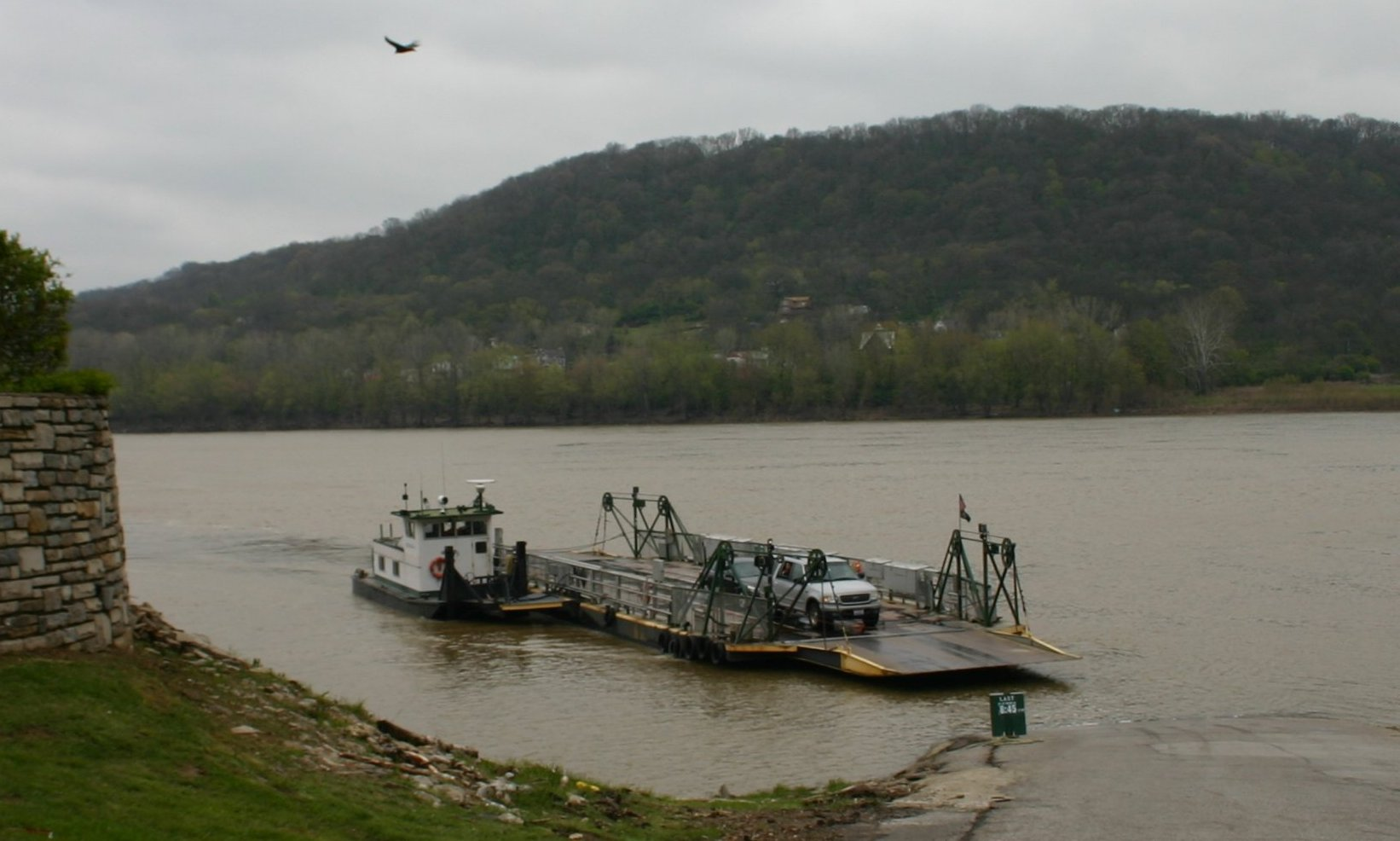

- Location within Ohio Location within the United States
- Location: Between Cincinnati, Ohio and Constance, Kentucky
- Coordinates: 39°4′35.16″N 84°37′28″W
- Built: 1817
- NRHP reference No.: 82003575
- Added to NRHP: June 10, 1982

The Anderson Ferry is a ferry across the Ohio River between Cincinnati, Ohio and Constance, Kentucky. It has been in continuous operation since 1817. It was founded by George W. Anderson, who eventually sold the business to the Kottmyer family who later sold it back to the Anderson family in 1986. The ferry was often used in the 19th century by Kentucky farmers bringing their product to market in Cincinnati. It is the lone survivor of dozens of ferries that once served the Cincinnati area. The ferry is located about 8 miles (13 km) west of Downtown Cincinnati.

== Route ==
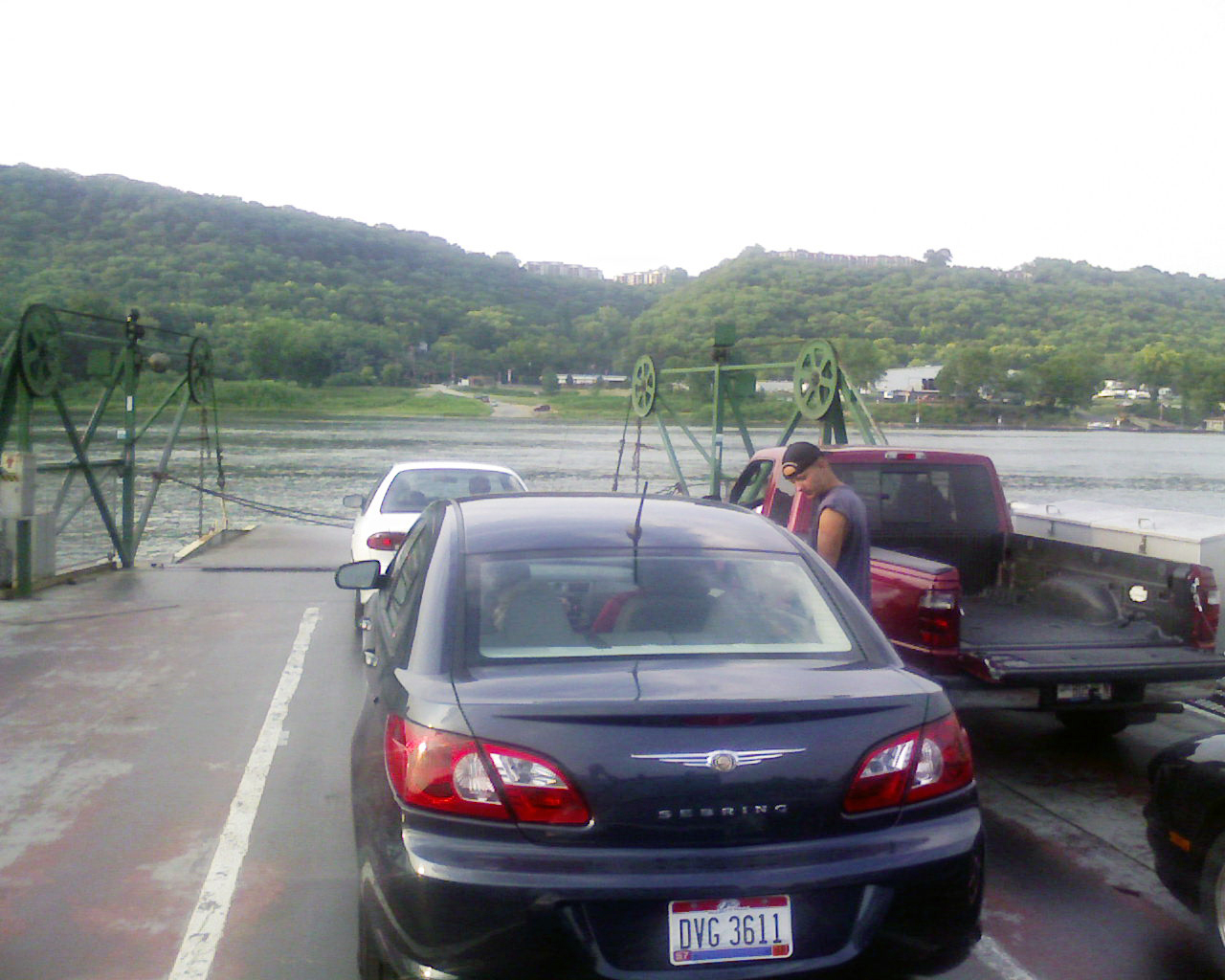
On board the ferry

The ferry connects Anderson Ferry Road (a major arterial street on the Ohio side which traverses the City of Cincinnati; Delhi Township; and Green Township from south to north) with a short private road, which in turn connects with Kentucky Route 8 (the middle section) just east of its junction with Kentucky Route 20 near Constance, Kentucky. A short distance southwest from this junction is KY 20's junction with Kentucky Route 212, which provides the main access to the Cincinnati/Northern Kentucky International Airport. It provides a shortcut for Cincinnati westsiders going to the airport located in Boone County, Kentucky. Price (January 2020) for a one-way ride with a car is $5.00; or a book of 10 tickets can be had for $35.00. In 2020 and 2021, the ferry saw a record amount of usage as closures and construction on the Brent Spence Bridge led to more vehicles utilizing the service.

== See also ==
- Piatt's Landing, Kentucky: historic ferry landing also in Boone County
- National Register of Historic Places listings in Boone County, Kentucky
