= Claflin =

Claflin may refer to:

== People ==
- Claflin family
- Mamie Claflin (1867–1929), American temperance and suffrage leader
- Tennessee Celeste Claflin (1844–1923), American suffragist
- Victoria California Claflin, birth name of Victoria Woodhull, American suffragist

== Other uses ==
- Claflin, Kansas, a small city in the United States
- Claflin University, Orangeburg, South Carolina
