= Kentucky Route 842 =

State highway in Kentucky, United States

Kentucky Route 842

Route information
- Maintained by KYTC
- Length: 7.395 mi (11.901 km)

Major junctions
- South end: US 25 in Florence
- US 42 / US 127 in Florence; I-71 / I-75 in Florence
- North end: KY 236 in Erlanger

Location
- Country: United States
- State: Kentucky
- Counties: Boone, Kenton

Highway system
- Kentucky State Highway System; Interstate; US; State; Parkways
← KY 841	→ KY 844

Kentucky Route 842 is a 7.4-mile-long (11.9 km) state highway in Kentucky. Although listed as an east–west route in Kentucky Transportation Cabinet route logs, KY 842 follows a north–south arc between its termini. The southern terminus of the route is at U.S. Route 25 (US 25) in Florence. The northern terminus is at KY 236 in Erlanger.

== Route description ==
KY 842 begins at an intersection with US 25 and Richardson Road, the unnumbered eastern continuation of KY 842, in Florence. KY 841 heads west as Weaver Road, crossing Interstate 71 (I-71) and I-75 with no access. Weaver Road, a mostly residential road with a few industries, as well as KY 842, then turns to the northwest to intersect US 42/US 127, where it becomes Hopeful Church Road. Hopeful Church Road, like Weaver Road, is mostly a residential road, connecting US 42/US 127 to KY 18. At KY 18, KY 842 changes names for the final time, becoming Houston Road. Located along Houston Road are many different restaurants plus many large stores. KY 842 continues northeast through Florence, intersecting I-71/I-75 before terminating at KY 236 in Erlanger.

== Major intersections ==
County	Location	mi	km	Destinations	Notes
Boone	Florence	0.000	0.000	US 25 (Dixie Highway)	
Boone	Florence	0.803	1.292	KY 3503 (Empire Connector Drive)	
Boone	Florence	2.572	4.139	US 42 / US 127	
Boone	Florence	4.764	7.667	KY 18 (Burlington Pike)	
Boone	Florence	6.010	9.672	KY 717 (Thoroughbred Boulevard) / I-71 / I-75 to I-71 / I-75 north	Ramp to I-71/I-75 south to the east; Access to I-71/I-75 North via KY-717 to the west
Boone	Florence	6.135	9.873	KY 1017 (Turfway Road)	
Kenton	Erlanger	7.395	11.901	KY 236 (Donaldson Highway)	
1.000 mi = 1.609 km; 1.000 km = 0.621 mi
