= Big Bone, Kentucky =

Unincorporated community in Kentucky, United States

Big Bone
- Unincorporated community
- Location within the state of Kentucky Big Bone (the United States)
- Coordinates: 38°53′19″N 84°45′7″W
- Country: United States
- State: Kentucky
- County: Boone
- Time zone: UTC-5 (Eastern (EST))
  - Summer (DST): UTC-4 (EDT)
- GNIS feature ID: 487080

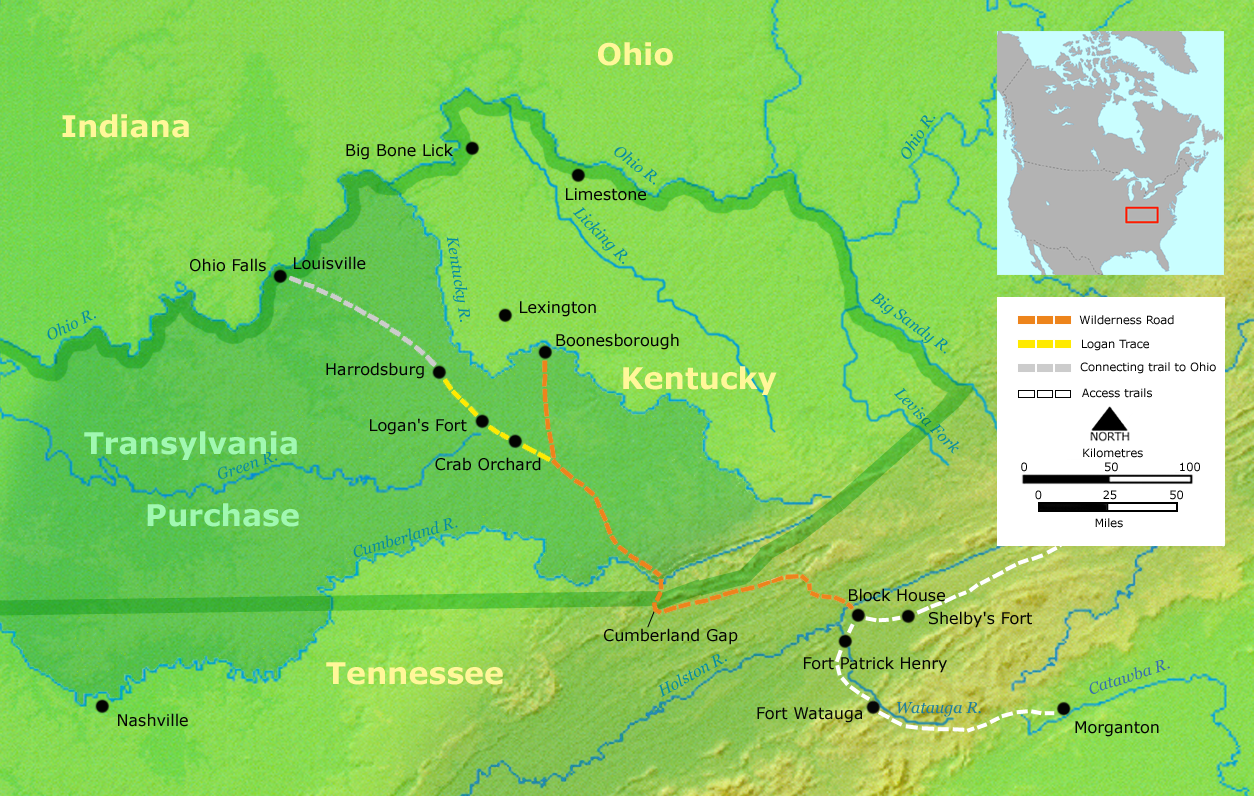
Big Bone Lick settlement shown in 1785 on a map of the Wilderness Road in Kentucky and Tennessee

Big Bone is an unincorporated community in southern Boone County, Kentucky, United States. It is bounded on the west by the Ohio River, and Rabbit Hash, on the south by Big Bone Creek, which empties into the river at Big Bone Landing. The northern extent is along Hathaway Road, and the eastern portion extends not further than U.S. 42, and is approached from that direction by Beaver Road (Route 338) coming from either Richwood or Walton. Big Bone took its name from a nearby prehistoric mineral lick of the same name. Geographical features of interest include Big Bone Lick State Park and the now disappeared Big Bone Island.

== History ==
Big Bone Lick, now the site of Big Bone Lick State Park, is a well-known landmark in the immediate area of Big Bone. The salt lick, or lick, as it is more generally known locally, was long known to the original inhabitants of the area. The fossil deposits were a well-known feature in the geographical region. The area was named after the extraordinarily large bones, including those of mammoths and mastodons, found in the swamps around the salt lick frequented by animals, who need salt in their diets. The mineral springs are created by water flowing through the underlying formations of limestone and shale, where the trapped salts are dissolved and carried, in solution, to the surface, creating brine.

In 1809, a salt furnace featuring two large furnaces with mounted kettles was built to extract salt from the brackish water. It was soon discovered that, due to the relatively low salinity of the springs, 500 to 600 gallons of water were required to produce a single bushel of salt. By 1812 the venture had failed.

The Clay House, a resort hotel, opened nearby in 1815, offering visitors an opportunity to bathe in the supposedly medicinal salt mineral springs. It quickly became popular among naturalists, who came to find bones for museums or private collections. The Clay House closed in 1830, but the salt springs remained a popular spa until 1847. A second hotel was built in 1870.

A post office called Bigbone was established in 1890, and remained in operation until 1941.

== Geography ==
Big Bone Creek enters the Ohio River at mile 516.8 below Pittsburgh. The mouth is at the division of Boone and Gallatin Counties, Kentucky, near the site of Big Bone Island. It is navigable for several miles, and flows through Big Bone Lick State Park.

=== Big Bone Island ===
Big Bone Island was a small, natural island composed of sand and gravel in the Ohio River near the mouth of Big Bone Creek at Big Bone. It is just south of the Boone County line in Gallatin County, Kentucky. Of note is that the county line "runs down the center of the creek". It plays a part in local lore and history of the area and was a popular fishing and camping location. The island has disappeared due mostly to the rise of the river caused by the construction of the Markland Dam, but also due to slabs of floating river ice which destroyed much of the vegetation and carried away most of the soil during the flooding of 1978.

== 1978 floods ==
In January 1978, the Ohio River rapidly rose from 29.6 feet on January 25 to 53.9 feet on January 30, during what has been described as "one of the most severe winter months in southwestern Ohio history." This caused an enormous ice jam, which eventually broke, sending "a wall of ice and water" downstream. It has been stated that the decisions and actions of the U.S. Army Corps of Engineers on January 27, 1978, at the Markland Dam, caused the ice jam to break. This was characterized as being perhaps the worst disaster in modernity on the Ohio River, and caused significant damage, with entire docks, barges and boats crammed against or forced through the Markland dam. A towboat and seven barges sank at the dam, three barges were swept over the dam, six barges were unaccounted for, and 11 barges lodged against the dam producing a major pollution and explosion potential. The ice literally "shaved off" Big Bone Island at the time.
