= Kentucky Route 1303 =

Highway in Kentucky

Kentucky Route 1303
- KY 1303 highlighted in red

Route information
- Maintained by KYTC
- Length: 6.248 mi (10.055 km)

Major junctions
- South end: KY 536 in Independence
- I-275 near Crestview Hills
- North end: US 25 / US 42 / US 127 in Lakeside Park

Location
- Country: United States
- State: Kentucky
- Counties: Kenton

Highway system
- Kentucky State Highway System; Interstate; US; State; Parkways
← KY 1302	→ KY 1304

Kentucky Route 1303 is a 6.397-mile-long (10.295 km) state highway in Kenton County, Kentucky. The southern terminus of the route is at KY 536 in Independence. The northern terminus is at U.S. Route 25, U.S. Route 42 and U.S. Route 127 in Lakeside Park. On its way to KY 536 it goes through many towns. These towns include Edgewood, Erlanger, and Independence. The southernmost segment of the route is named Bristow Road, a moniker carried by KY 536 east of KY 1303. At Richardson Road in Independence, KY 1303 becomes Turkeyfoot Road, a name the route retains to its northern terminus.

== Route description ==
KY 1303 begins at an intersection with KY 536 in Independence, heading north on two-lane undivided Bristow Road. The road passes farmland before heading through suburban residential neighborhoods. The route widens into a five-lane road with a center left-turn lane and intersects Richardson Road, at which point the name changes to Turkeyfoot Road. KY 1303 intersects KY 1829 and forms a concurrency with that route. After KY 1829 splits to the west, the road passes through more suburban neighborhoods with some woods, heading into Erlanger. The route intersects the southern terminus of KY 236 and continues to the northeast, entering Crestview Hills. KY 1303 heads into commercial areas and becomes a four-lane divided highway as it reaches an interchange with I-275. Past this interchange, the route narrows into a two-lane undivided road and passes through residential neighborhoods, entering Lakeside Park. KY 1303 curves to the northwest and comes to its northern terminus at an intersection with US 25/US 42/US 127.

== Major intersections ==
The entire route is in Kenton County.

Location	mi	km	Destinations	Notes
Independence	0.000	0.000	KY 536 (Mt. Zion Road/Bristow Road)	
Independence	1.698	2.733	KY 1829 east (Richardson Road)	South end of KY 1829 overlap
Independence	2.032	3.270	KY 1829 west (Industrial Road)	North end of KY 1829 overlap
Erlanger	3.972	6.392	KY 236 west (Stevenson Road)	Eastern terminus of KY 236
Crestview Hills	5.685	9.149	I-275 to KY 17 / I-71 / I-75 / US 25 / US 42 / US 127 – Airport	I-275 exit 82
Lakeside Park	6.248	10.055	US 25 / US 42 / US 127 (Dixie Highway)	
1.000 mi = 1.609 km; 1.000 km = 0.621 mi: Concurrency terminus
