= Beaverlick, Kentucky =

Unincorporated community in Kentucky, United States

- Unincorporated community
- Location within Kentucky
- Coordinates: 38°52′44″N 84°41′40″W
- Country: United States
- State: Kentucky
- County: Boone
- Elevation: 751 ft (229 m)
- Time zone: UTC-5 (Eastern (EST))
  - Summer (DST): UTC-4 (EDT)
- Area code: 859
- GNIS feature ID: 486636

Beaverlick is an unincorporated community in Boone County, Kentucky, United States. Beaverlick is located along U.S. Route 42 and U.S. Route 127 4.5 miles (7.2 km) west of Walton. The community was established as a fur trading site between 1780 and 1820. The community was founded sometime in the early 1800s. A post office was established at Beaver Lick in 1854 with John Tucker its postmaster. The post office closed in 1944.

Beaverlick was spelled as one word beginning sometime in 1895. The community's name came from its location at the source of the Beaver Branch of Big Bone Creek.

After its establishment, the community eventually grew to have a general store, two blacksmiths, a carriage maker, two physicians, a hotel, a flour mill, a millinery shop and three churches.

At the end of the 1800s, Beaverlick had around 50 residents. As time went on, the community's population dwindled, and today, "not much is left of this small village..." "...except historic houses, churches and cemeteries."

Beaverlick is part of the Cincinnati metropolitan area.
