= Ayler =

Ayler is a surname. Notable people with the surname include:

- Albert Ayler (1936–1970), American jazz saxophonist, singer, and composer
- Donald Ayler (1942–2007), American jazz trumpeter, brother of Albert
- Ethel Ayler (1930–2018), American actress

== See also ==
- Aylor (disambiguation)
- Aylmer
