= Kentucky Route 717 =

State highway in Kentucky, United States

Kentucky Route 717
- Thoroughbred Boulevard, Turfway Road
- KY 717 highlighted in red

Route information
- Maintained by KYTC
- Length: 2.977 mi (4.791 km)
- Existed: 1987–present

Major junctions
- South end: KY 842 / I-71 / I-75 in Florence
- KY 1017 in Florence; KY 236 near Erlanger
- North end: KY 3076 in Erlanger

Location
- Country: United States
- State: Kentucky
- Counties: Boone, Kenton

Highway system
- Kentucky State Highway System; Interstate; US; State; Parkways
← KY 716	→ KY 718

Kentucky Route 717 (KY 717) is a 2.977-mile-long (4.791 km) state highway in northeastern Boone County and northwestern Kenton County, Kentucky, that runs from KY 842 and the southbound lanes of Interstate 71 (I-71) and I-75 in northwestern Florence to KY 3076 and Turfway Road in northwestern Erlanger.

== History ==
KY 717 was designated on December 3, 1987. On March 14, 2014, the road was extended east replacing part of KY 1017.

The original KY 717 was as a loop off of US 41 Alternate in Hopkinsville via 21st Street. This was decommissioned by September 26, 1980.

== Major intersections ==
County	Location	mi	km	Destinations	Notes
Boone	Florence	0.000	0.000	KY 842 (Houston Road) / I-71 south / I-75 south	Southern terminus; continues as southbound ramps beyond KY 842; no direct access from I-71/I-75 north to KY 717 or from KY 717 to I-71/I-75 north
Boone	Florence	0.368	0.592	KY 1017 east (Turfway Road) / Turfway Park	South end of KY 1017 overlap
Boone		0.620	0.998	KY 1017 west (Aero Parkway)	North end of KY 1017 overlap
Boone		1.538	2.475	KY 3147 east (OHara Road)	Western terminus of KY 3147
Boone		1.927	3.101	KY 236 (Donaldson Highway)	
Kenton	Erlanger	2.977	4.791	KY 3076 (Dolwick Drive) / Turfway Road	Northern terminus; continues as Turfway Road beyond KY 3076
1.000 mi = 1.609 km; 1.000 km = 0.621 mi: Concurrency terminus
