= Kentucky Route 212 =

State highway in Kentucky, United States

Kentucky Route 212
- KY 212 highlighted in red

Route information
- Maintained by KYTC
- Length: 1.131 mi (1.820 km)
- Existed: 1972 (numbered 1974)–present

Major junctions
- South end: CVG Airport in Hebron
- I-275 in Hebron
- North end: KY 20 in Hebron

Location
- Country: United States
- State: Kentucky
- Counties: Boone

Highway system
- Kentucky State Highway System; Interstate; US; State; Parkways
| ← KY 211 | → KY 213 |

Kentucky Route 212 (KY 212) is a short state highway located in Boone County, in the northern region of the U.S. state of Kentucky. The highway is approximately 1.3 miles (2.1 km) long, and partially constructed as a freeway, with the rest being a divided highway. The roadway links Interstate 275 (I-275) to the Cincinnati/Northern Kentucky International Airport (CVG Airport), and has been designated as a connector route by the Federal Highway Administration (FHWA).

== Route description ==
Kentucky Route 212 begins at an incomplete interchange with a one-way loop road, named Terminal Drive, in the central region of Cincinnati/Northern Kentucky International Airport. At this interchange, KY 212 is a four-lane divided highway. The highway proceeds northeast reaching a diamond interchange with Kentucky Route 236 (Donaldson Road). A turnaround ramp that transfers southbound traffic to the northbound lanes is located a short distance from the termini of the southbound ramps of the interchange. The roadway continues northward from the interchange, passing a large airport parking lot and a small airport road before reaching a partial cloverleaf interchange with I-275. The road proceeds northward from the interchange, passing a few small businesses before reaching its northern terminus, an at-grade intersection with Kentucky Route 20, known as Petersburg Road.

Kentucky Route 212 is maintained by the Kentucky Transportation Cabinet (KYTC). Part of the job of the KYTC is to measure traffic along the highway. These counts are taken using a metric called annual average daily traffic (AADT). This is a statistical calculation of the average daily number of vehicles that travel along a portion of the highway. The highest AADT along KY 212 at the southern portion of the interchange with I-275, with an approximate count of 21,219 vehicles. The lowest AADT along the highway is just north of the interchange with I-275, with an approximate count of 11,100 vehicles. The portion of the highway traveling from the interchange with I-275 to the southern terminus is designated as an Intermodal Connector Route, part of the National Highway System, a network of roads important to the country's economy, defense, and mobility.

== History ==
A road first appeared near the location of KY 212 around 1937. A short road was built in the location of KY 212 when the U.S. Army Air Corps built the predecessor to the CVG Airport. The road was reconstructed to a divided highway in 1972, but was part of KY 1334 until 1974 or later, when KY 212 was designated, and KY 1334 was rerouted via Youell Road to end at KY 20 (KY 1334 was decommissioned December 3, 1987 and partially destroyed by the runway extension).

The original KY 212 went southeast from KY 100 in Meshack southeast to Center Point. This road was decommissioned by 1967, and is now KY 2439. There was another KY 212 which was formed in 1967 as the Owensboro freeway bypass (now part of US 60).

== Exit list ==
The entire route is in Hebron, Boone County. All exits are unnumbered.

| mi | km | Destinations | Notes |
|---|---|---|---|
| 0.000 | 0.000 | Terminal Drive | Southern terminus |
| 0.293– 0.345 | 0.472– 0.555 | KY 236 (Donaldson Road) | Diamond interchange |
| 0.872– 0.914 | 1.403– 1.471 | I-275 to I-71 / I-75 – Cincinnati, Lexington, Louisville | Partial-Cloverleaf Interchange; exit 4 on I-275 |
| 1.131 | 1.820 | KY 20 (Petersburg Road) | Northern terminus; at-grade intersection |
1.000 mi = 1.609 km; 1.000 km = 0.621 mi
