= Constance, Kentucky =

Unincorporated community in Kentucky, United States

- Unincorporated community
- Location within Kentucky
- Coordinates: 39°04′26″N 84°38′15″W
- Country: United States
- State: Kentucky
- County: Boone
- Elevation: 499 ft (152 m)
- Time zone: UTC-5 (Eastern (EST))
  - Summer (DST): UTC-4 (EDT)
- Area code: 859
- GNIS feature ID: 489988

Constance is an unincorporated community in Boone County, Kentucky, United States. Constance is located on the Ohio River and Kentucky Route 8, 5.2 miles (8.4 km) north of Florence.

A post office called Constance was established in 1855, and remained in operation until November 1997. The ZIP Code for Constance was 41009, which has since been retired. It is unknown why the name "Constance" was applied to this community.

The Henry and Agnes Rolsen House and the south end of the Anderson Ferry, which are both listed on the National Register of Historic Places, are located in Constance.
