= Sugartit, Kentucky =

- Former settlement
- Location within Kentucky
- Coordinates: 38°58′22″N 84°39′46″W
- Country: United States
- State: Kentucky
- County: Boone
- Elevation: 794 ft (242 m)
- Time zone: UTC-5 (Eastern (EST))
  - Summer (DST): UTC-4 (EDT)
- GNIS feature ID: 504705

Sugartit (formerly known as Pleasant Ridge and later as Gunpowder in the 1920s) (Note: "according to The Cincinnati Enquirer, "it had the name of Pleasant Ridge as shown on Lake's 1883 Atlas. It was later called Gunpowder and the area is so designated in John Uri Lloyd's book, 'Felix Moses, Beloved Jew.'") is a rural community in Boone County, Kentucky, United States. It was located at the intersection of U.S. Route 42 and Kentucky Route 237 between the cities of Florence and Union. Sugartit has been noted for its unusual place name.

The community no longer exists and has mostly been annexed into Florence. The last surviving structure was the Sugartit Asphalt factory.

== Etymology ==
According to one account, the community received the name Sugartit because the local men would go to its general store during the winter months, when less farm work was needed, and return home late for dinner; their wives would remark that they "had to have a sugar tit at the store".

== History ==
In 1883, when the community was named Pleasant Ridge, amenities and services included a blacksmith, a general store/paint store, the Pleasant Ridge School, a steam saw and grist mill.

During the time it was named Gunpowder in the 1920s and onward, the community had a post office and general store and a blacksmith shop. Both ceased to exist sometime after the mid-1900s.

In the mid-1960s, few businesses existed, with the Sugartit Asphalt Company and Haines Oil being the only remaining businesses.

Since the 2000s, suburban development from Florence has encroached the former settlement. Today, the Sugartit area “has several businesses and amenities on Route 42, such as fast food restaurants, a gas station, a car wash, banks, apartments, a body shop, hardware, a church, a pub and other establishments. Additionally, Tri-State Running Company has a store here.

Sugartit never became an incorporated town.
