= J.M. Aylor House =

- U.S. National Register of Historic Places
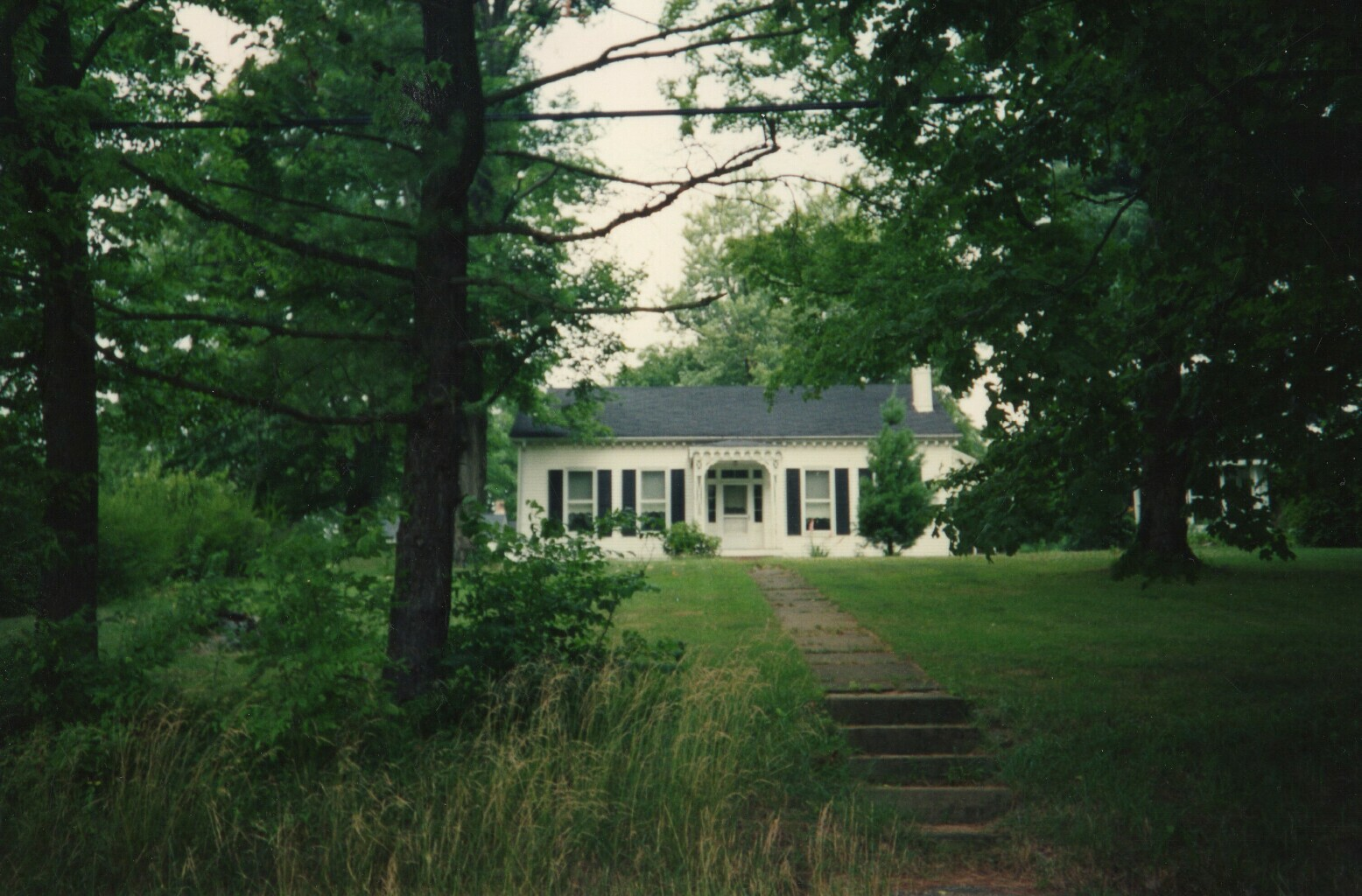

- Location within Kentucky Location within the United States
- Location: 2162 Petersburg Rd. Hebron, Kentucky
- Coordinates: 39°04′00″N 84°42′34″W
- Area: less than one acre
- Architectural style: Gothic Revival
- MPS: Boone County MRA
- NRHP reference No.: 88003275
- Added to NRHP: February 6, 1989

The J.M. Aylor House, at 2162 Petersburg Rd. in Hebron, Kentucky is a historic house listed on the National Register of Historic Places in 1989. The listing included two contributing buildings and a contributing structure.

The house is a double-pile central passage plan house. The property includes a hexagonal gazebo with a hipped roof, and a one-room caretaker's/servant's house with a gabled roof and bargeboard ornamentation.
