= Mamie Claflin =

American temperance and woman suffrage leader

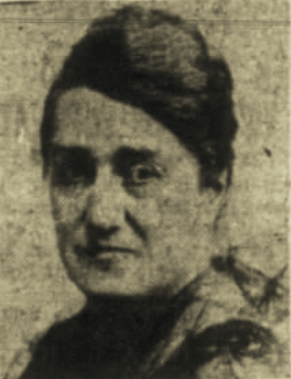
- Photo in Lincoln Journal Star, 1929
- Born: Mamie Mildred Perkins; March 8, 1867; Burlington, Kentucky, U.S.
- Died: December 1, 1929; Lincoln, Nebraska, U.S.
- Resting place: Ord, Nebraska
- Occupations: temperance and suffrage leader; newspaper editor and publisher
- Organizations: Woman's Christian Temperance Union
- Spouse: Jason Lewis Claflin (m. 1886)
- Children: 3

Mamie Claflin (née Perkins; March 8, 1867 – December 1, 1929) was an American temperance and woman suffrage leader. For six years, she served as president of the Nebraska Woman's Christian Temperance Union (WCTU) (1912–18). For 16 years, she was also the editor and publisher of its organ, The Union Worker (1898–1912; 1927–29).

== Early life and education ==
Mamie Mildred Perkins was born at Burlington, Kentucky, March 8, 1867. Her parents were Richard C. Perkins (b. 1842) and Jeannette (Blythe) Perkins (b. 1845). The father, a veteran of the Civil War, became a homesteader in Hall County, Nebraska. Mamie had four younger siblings: Edith, Jeanetta, R. Clark, and Emanuel.

She was educated in the public schools of Kentucky and of Hall County, Nebraska, arriving in Nebraska with her family in 1874. She graduated from the high school at Grand Island, Nebraska.

== Career ==
After graduation, she became a teacher in Howard and Hall counties.

In 1886, she married Jason Lewis Claflin (1858–1944), of Grand Island, Nebraska. For the next ten years, the couple together published the St. Paul Phonograph. During the period of 1896–1905, they were editors of the Ord Journal.

Joining the Methodist Episcopal Church and the WCTU in the same year, at St. Paul, Nebraska, she was selected as the superintendent of the Sunday school Temperance Department of the WCTU in 1893. Four years later, she was made State corresponding secretary and also placed in charge of the official State organ, The Union Worker, a position she held for sixteen years, serving as its editor and publisher. In 1913, she was elected president, of the Nebraska WCTU, and she was annually reelected until 1919. (Note: In Claflin's obituary published by the Lincoln Journal Star, the dates of her presidency are given as 1912–18.)

In the State Prohibition campaign of 1916, which made Nebraska a dry state, Claflin was a member of the board of managers of the State Dry Federation. She maintained an office in Lincoln, Nebraska and had charge of the literature department of the prohibition campaign.

During World War I, she was a member of the State Council of Defense, and took a leading part in raising funds and otherwise providing for the comfort of the troops in the cantonments and training camps.

She was an ardent suffragist and actively engaged in every campaign in which woman suffrage was an issue, finding time, also, to aid in the work of various other organizations for the advancement of women.

== Personal life ==
The Claflins had three daughters, Faith, Mildred, and Dorothy.

Mamie Claflin broke her hip in July 1929, and suffered a stroke thereafter. She died in Lincoln, Nebraska, December 1 of that year and was buried in Ord, Nebraska.
