= Big Bone Lick State Park =

State park in Boone County, Kentucky

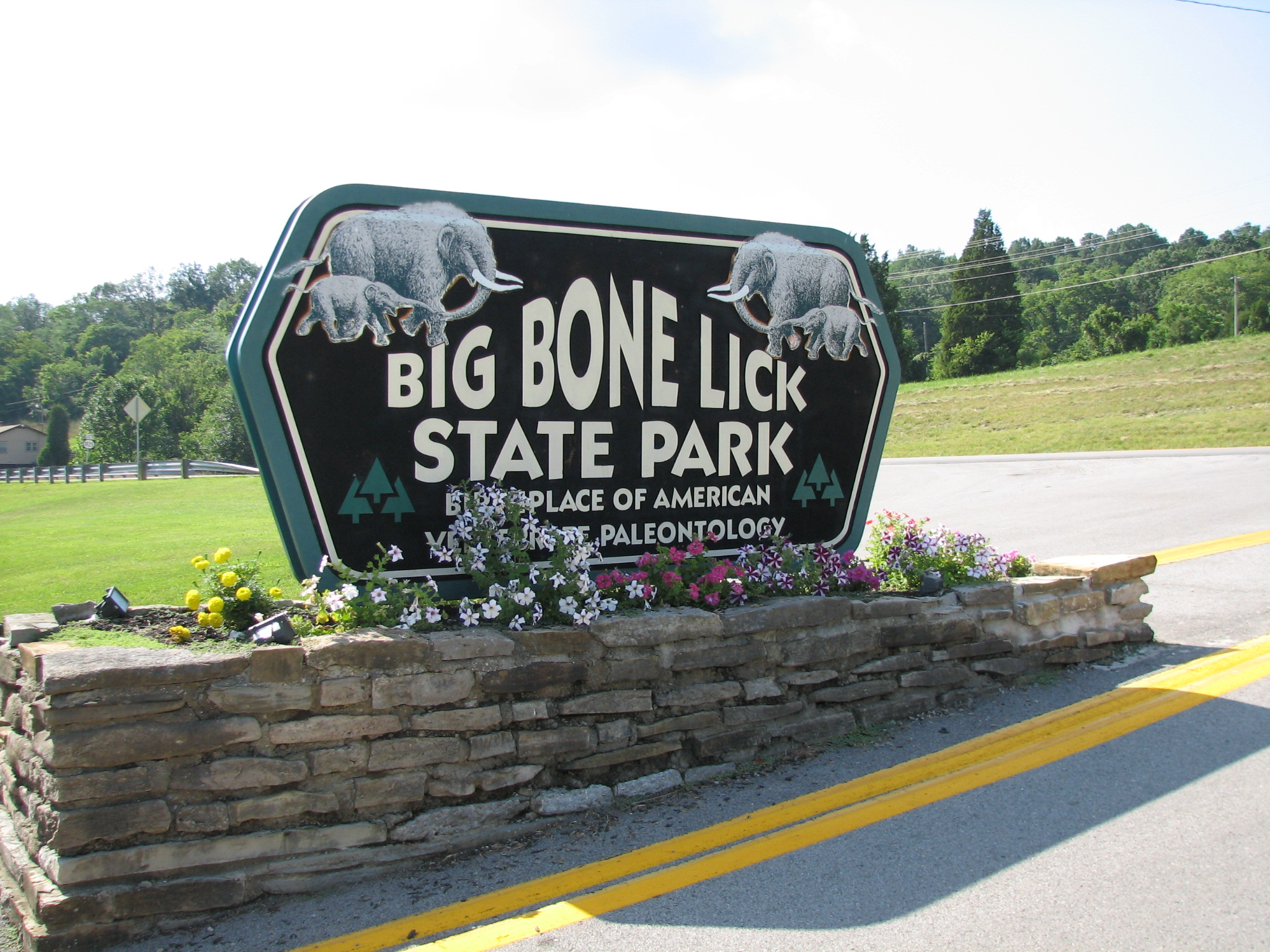

- Location within Kentucky Location within the United States
- Type: Kentucky state park
- Location: Boone County, Kentucky
- Nearest city: Union, Kentucky
- Coordinates: 38°53′13″N 84°44′52″W
- Area: 525 acres (212 ha)
- Elevation: 469 feet (143 m)
- Created: 1960
- Operator: Kentucky Department of Parks
- Open: Year-round
- Big Bone Lick State Park
- U.S. National Register of Historic Places
- U.S. National Historic Landmark
- NRHP reference No.: 72001585 (NRHP nomination); 100011352 (NHL designation)

Significant dates
- Added to NRHP: June 13, 1972
- Designated NHL: December 13, 2024

U.S. National Natural Landmark
- Designated: 2009

Big Bone Lick State Park is located at Big Bone in Boone County, Kentucky. The name of the park comes from the Pleistocene megafauna fossils found there. Mammoths are believed to have been drawn to this location by a salt lick deposited around the sulfur springs. Other animals including forms of bison, caribou, deer, elk, horse, mastodon, musk ox, peccary, ground sloths, wolves, black bears, stag moose, saber-toothed cats, and possibly tapir also grazed the vegetation and salty earth around the springs that the animals relied on for their diet. The majority of fossils found in the area have been dated to the Wisconsin Glacial Period (c. 115,000 – c. 11,700 years ago). Human burials and other signs of human habitation have also been uncovered.

== History ==
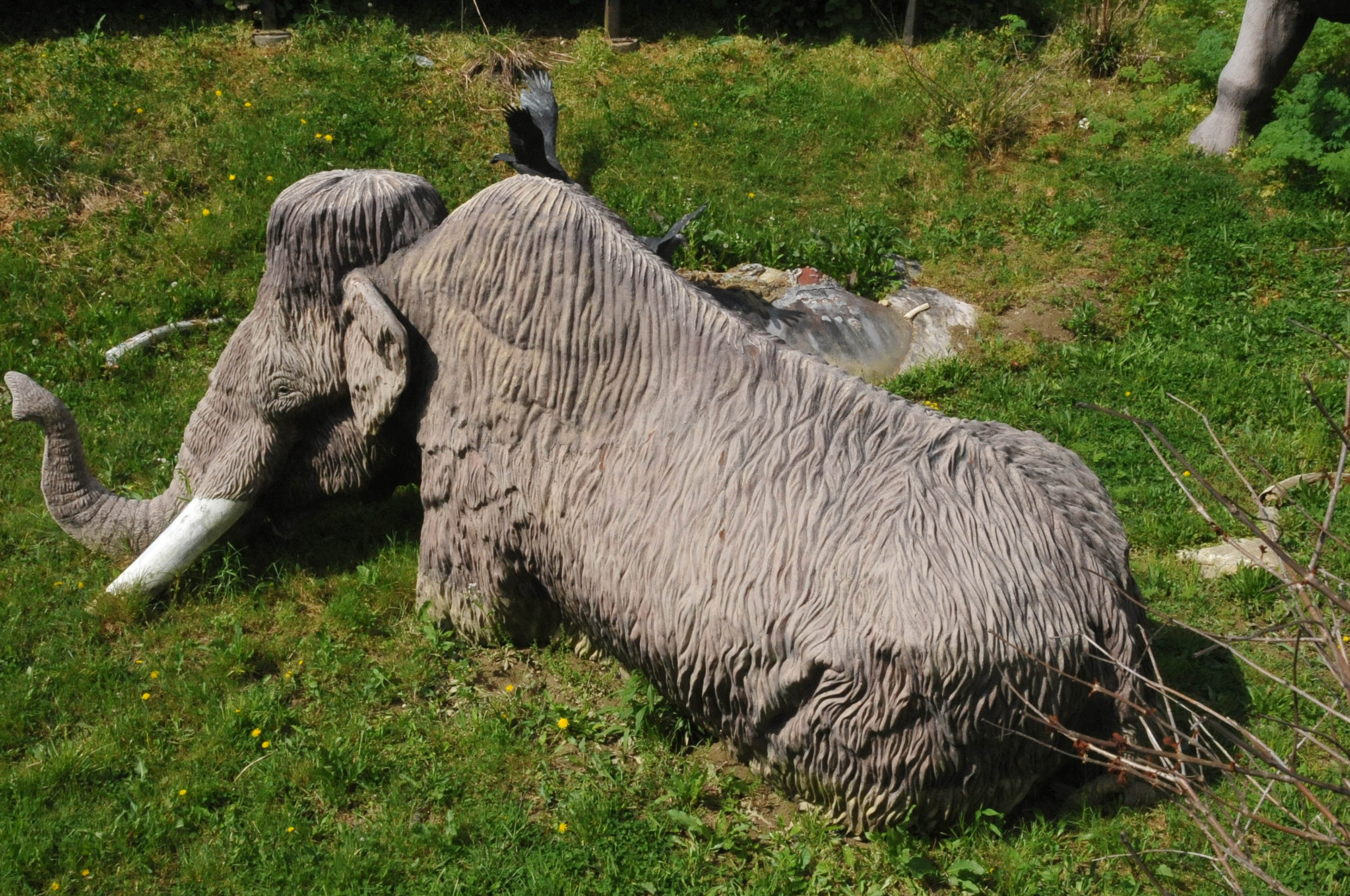
Statue of a woolly mammoth stuck in the soft earth, showing how the fossils were created.

The salt lick, or lick, as it is more generally known locally, and its fossil deposits, were long known to the original inhabitants of the area. The area was named after the extraordinarily large bones, including those of mammoths and mastodons, found in the swamps around the salt lick frequented by animals, who need salt in their diets. The mineral springs are created by water flowing through the underlying formations of limestone and shale, where the trapped salts are dissolved and carried, in solution, to the surface, creating a brine spring. The area near the springs was very soft and marshy causing many animals to become stuck with no way to escape.

=== 18th century ===
The site may have been visited as early as 1739 by Captain Charles le Moyne de Longueuil, Baron de Longueuil. He took the fossils he recovered back to France with him the next year and donated them to the natural history museum in the Jardin des Plantes.

On March 13, 1750, Christopher Gist stopped at Big Bone Lick and wrote in his journal:

"Wednesday 13. — We set out...down the said River on the SE Side...I met two men belonging to Robert Smith at whose House I lodged...The said Robt. Smith had given me an order upon these men for two of the teeth of a large Beest, which they were bringing from towards the Falls of the Ohio, one of which I turned in and delivered to the Ohio Company...The tooth which I brought in...was a Jaw toothe of better Weight than four Pounds; it appeared to be the furtherest Tooth in the Jaw, and looked Like Fine Ivory when the outside was scraped off."

Gist is referring to Robert Smith, an Indian trader, who may have visited Big Bone Lick as early as 1744.

Mary Draper Ingles, a frontier settler, was captured by Shawnee Indians on July 30, 1755, and taken to Lower Shawneetown. After two weeks there, she was taken to Big Bone Lick and put to work boiling brine to make salt, which the Shawnee sold or traded for other goods. In late October, Ingles persuaded another woman to escape with her and they walked over 600 miles (970 km) to her home in what is now Blacksburg, Virginia.

In 1762, amateur naturalist James Wright wrote to John Bartram describing the Big Bone Lick and some of the fossils there, although he had not been there himself, and had heard about them from the Indians:

"There appear to be the remains of 5 Entire Sceletons, with their heads All pointing towards Each other, And near together, suppos'd to have fallen at the same time...Their heads, of which two were larger than the rest, one of these, they said a Man Could but Just Grasp in Both his Arms, with a long Nose, And the Mouth on the underside...They Judged the Creature when Alive must have been the Size of a Small House."

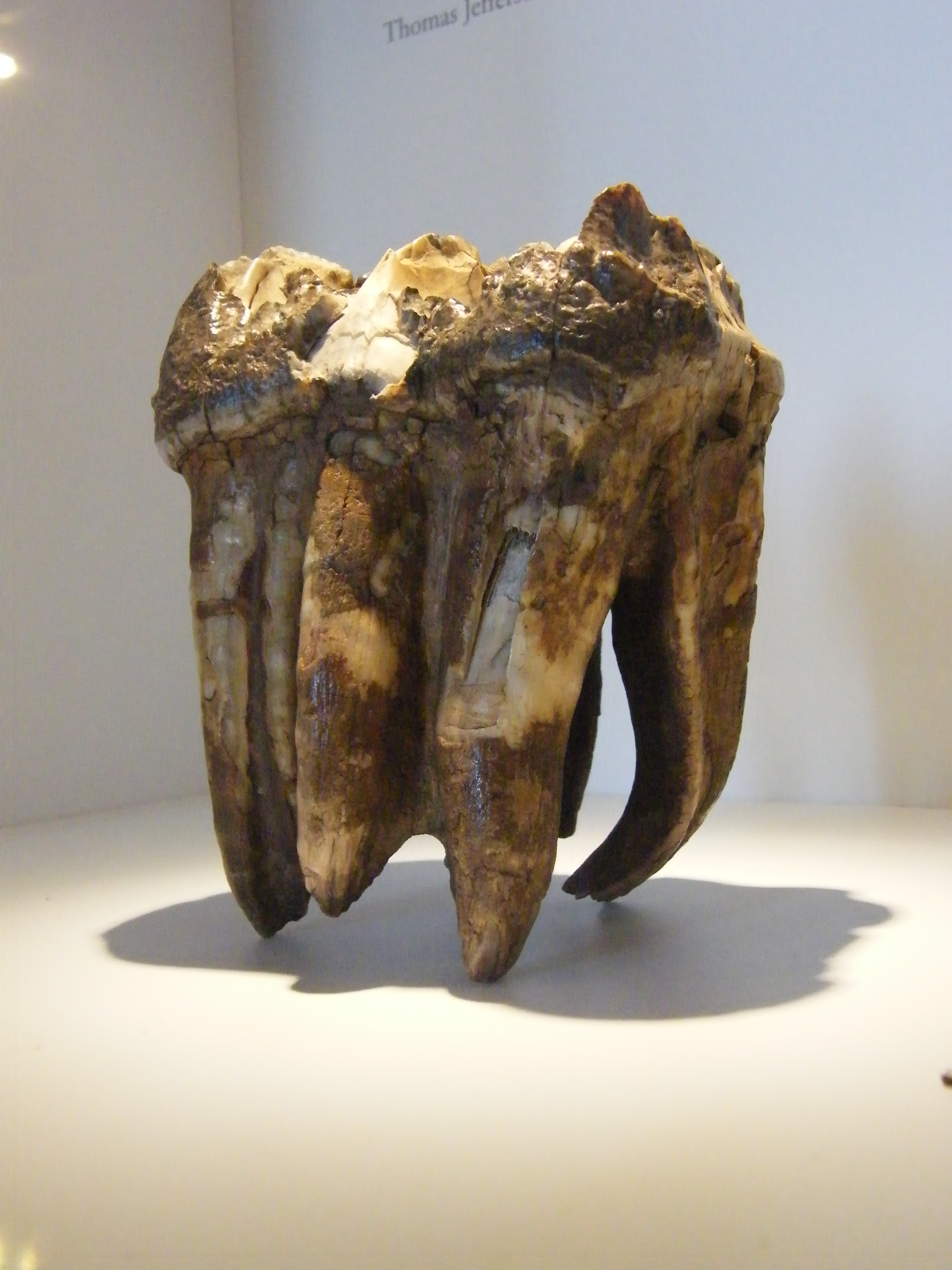
Anatomist William Hunter suggested in 1768 that this mastodon tooth came from an extinct type of carnivorous elephant.

Indian trader George Croghan visited Big Bone Lick in May 1765 and took two six-foot tusks and several other fossil bones, but when he was attacked by Indians a few days later, he lost all his belongings. He returned to Big Bone Lick in June 1766, and collected a number of bones which he took back with him to New York and sent to Benjamin Franklin as a gift. The bones were first examined by botanist Peter Collinson who pronounced them "the carcasses of drowned elephants," who had died, according to Collinson, during The Deluge described in the Book of Genesis. Anatomist William Hunter examined the bones and suggested that they came from an extinct species of carnivorous elephant, which became known as "the American incognitum". Naturalist Georges Cuvier decided that they belonged to an extinct ancestor of the elephant, which Cuvier named "Mastodontes." The idea that any species ever became extinct was revolutionary at this time.

Daniel Boone reportedly visited Big Bone Lick between May and July 1770, after having been captured and released by Shawnee Indians. According to Lyman Draper, Boone "examined the wonderful fossil remains of mammoth found there." On June 15, 1775, Nicholas Cresswell visited Big Bone Lick, then called "Elephant Bone Lick". His diary entry reads, in part:

"Found several bones of a prodigious size, I take them to be Elephants, for we found a part of a tusk, about two foot long, Ivory to all appearance, but by length of time had grown yellow and very soft. All of us stripped and went into the pond to grabble for teeth and found several. Joseph Passiers found a jaw tooth which he gave me. It was judged by the company to weigh 10 pound. I got a shell of a Tusk of hard and good ivory about eighteen inches long. There is a great number of bones in a Bank on the side of this pond of an enormous size but decayed and rotten. Ribs 9 inches broad, Thigh bones 10 inches diameter. What sort of animals these were is not clearly known."

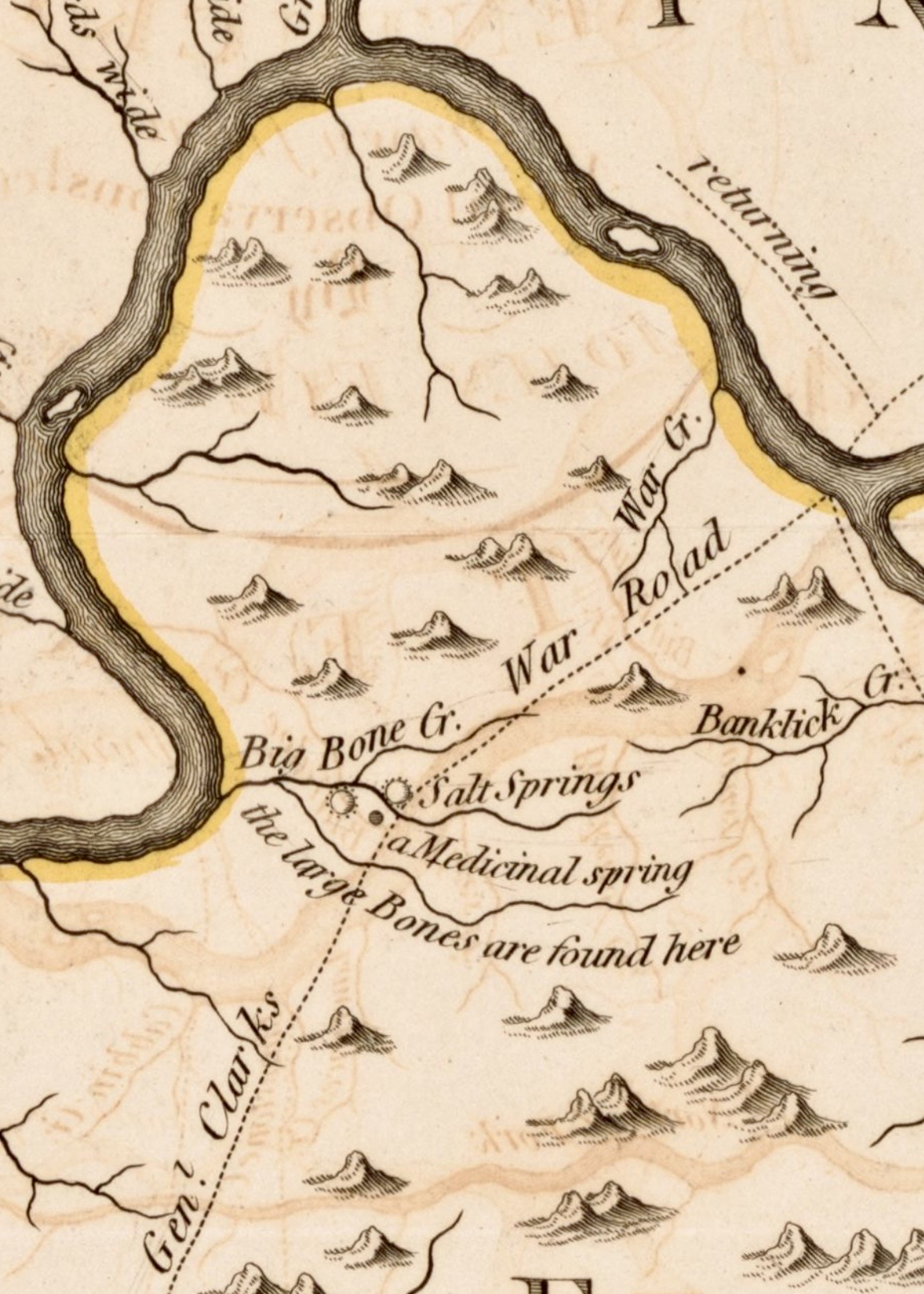
Big Bone Lick on John Filson's 1794 map of Kentucky

In 1795 future president William Henry Harrison collected 13 hogsheads full of fossils, all of which were lost when the barge carrying them sank on the Ohio River.

=== 19th century ===
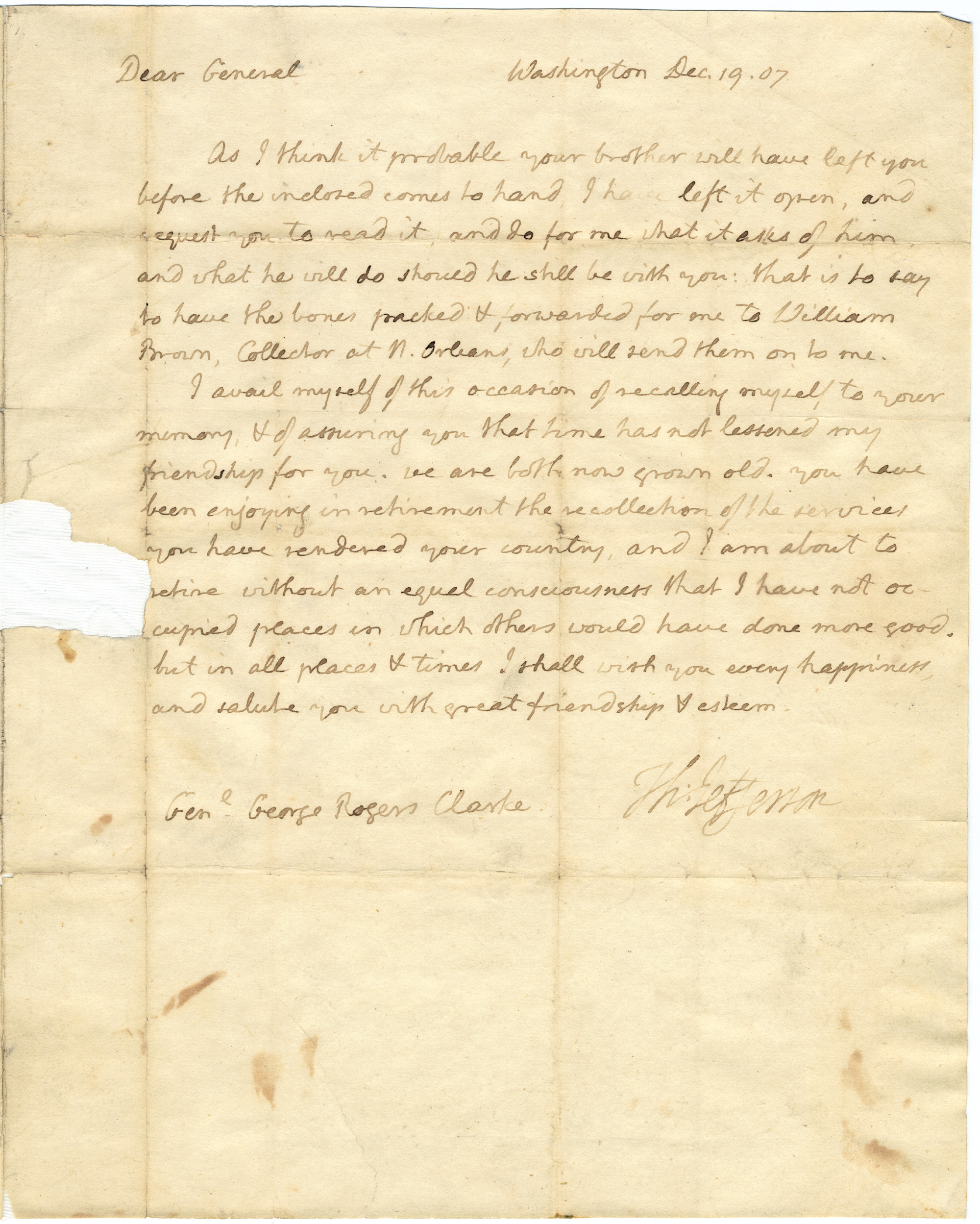
1807 letter from Thomas Jefferson to George Rogers Clark requesting that the bones Rogers had collected at Big Bone Lick be packed and shipped to a New Orleans collector, who would then forward them to Washington.

In 1803 physician William Goforth excavated a large number of bones at Big Bone Lick and sold them in Europe, although the money was stolen from him. Goforth described his finds to Meriwether Lewis who wrote a lengthy description of the bones to Thomas Jefferson. Lewis visited Big Bone Lick in late 1803 and retrieved a number of bones, all of which were lost or stolen. In September 1807 Lewis's friend William Clark, accompanied by his brother George Rogers Clark, visited Big Bone Lick and removed over 300 bones and teeth, which he sent to Jefferson with an eleven-page description. Jefferson donated some of the bones to the Muséum d’Histoire Naturelle in Paris and the Academy of Natural Sciences in Philadelphia. Studies of the bones allowed naturalists to distinguish between mastodons and mammoths and a few other species found in the collection. Jefferson's own private collection was unfortunately ground into fertilizer by a servant.

Clark also found three Clovis spear points, which indicated that early Native Americans had hunted in the area. One mastodon bone was unearthed with a noticeable cut mark on it, implying that the Clovis people lived in the area thousands of years ago.

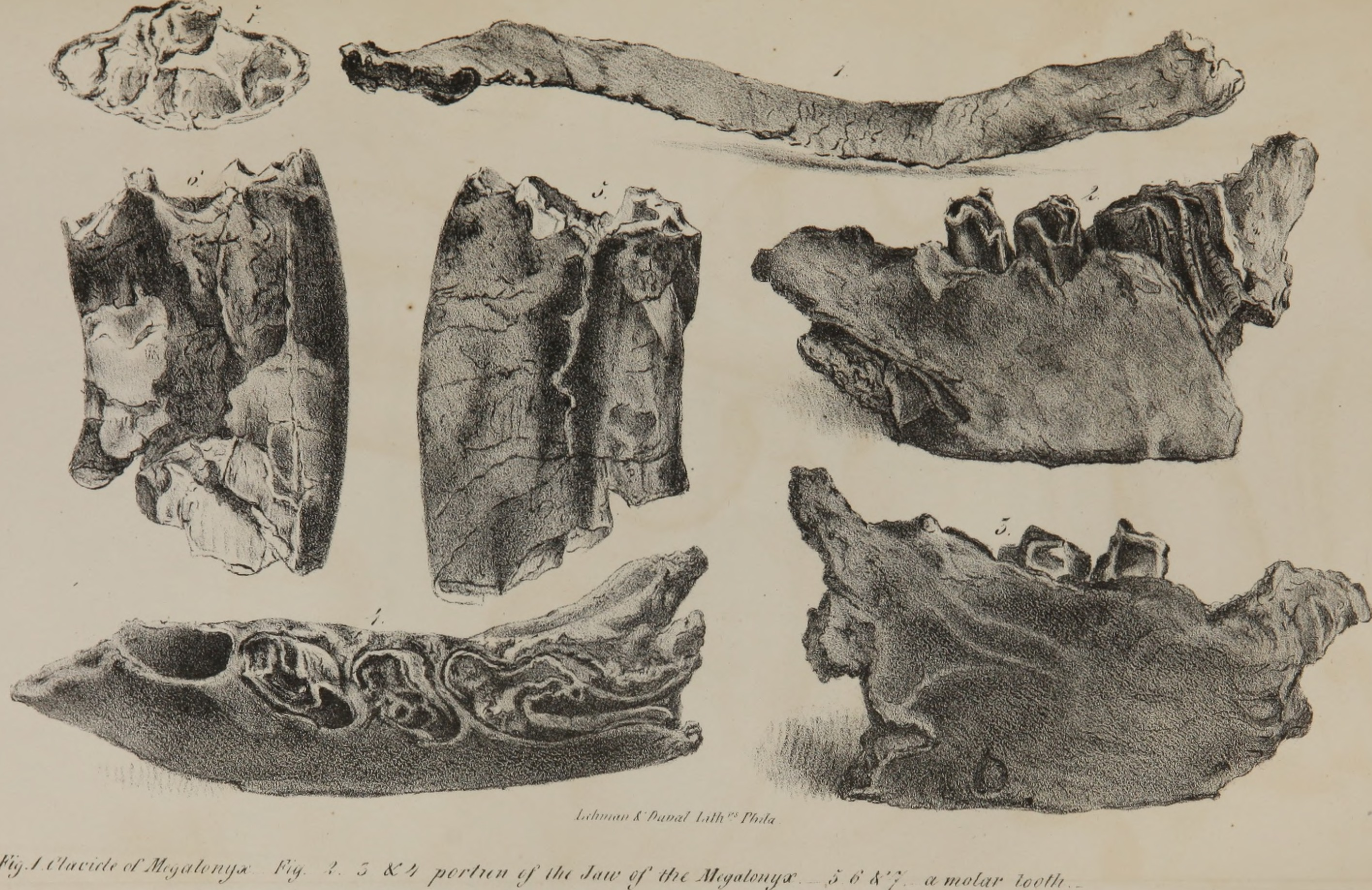
Bones of Paramylodon collected from Big Bone Lick and identified as Megalonyx laqueatus in 1831 by Richard Harlan.

The Clay House, a resort hotel, opened nearby in 1815, offering visitors an opportunity to bathe in the supposedly medicinal salt mineral springs. It quickly became popular among naturalists, who came to find bones for museums or private collections. Notable visitors included Yale professor Benjamin Silliman and natural history professor Constantine S. Rafinesque, among others. The Clay House closed in 1830.

In 1831, paleontologist Richard Harlan identified a new species of giant sloth, Megalonyx laqueatus, from bones found at Big Bone Lick. In 1840, the species was renamed Mylodon harlani to honor Harlan, and is now known as Paramylodon harlani.

By the mid-19th century most of the fossils had been removed, and in 1868 paleontologist Nathaniel Southgate Shaler conducted an extensive excavation to remove all remaining fossils and take them to the Harvard Museum of Comparative Zoology for study. Despite this, Dr. Christopher Columbus Graham, at the advanced age of 93, began excavations in 1877. Graham wrote in an article for the Louisville Courier, "The Mammoth’s Graveyard," that he spent thirty days at the site while ten men dug up the fossils. He collected seven barrels of bones and teeth of mastodons and mammoths, as well as buffalo skulls and the remains of bear, wolf and cougar. Graham corresponded with Charles Darwin and English geologist Sir Charles Lyell, (who had visited the site in 1841) regarding Big Bone Lick.

=== 20th century ===
April 1, 1926 saw the installation of a memorial bell at the park's Southern entrance, following the passing of George Rogers Clark.

In 1932, William Snyder Webb and William Funkhouser conducted an extensive archaeological survey of Big Bone Lick, which uncovered two prehistoric burial mounds and a cemetery of uncertain age.

From 1962 to 1967 the University of Nebraska conducted excavations, seeking any remaining fossils and attempting to determine the age and ecological context of the mammoths and mastodons that had died there. Over 2,000 fossils were uncovered and identified, including the bones of the giant ground sloth (Mylodon harlani and Megalonyx jeffersoni), tapir (Tapirus haysii), mastodon (Mammut americanum), large bison (Bison antiquus), musk ox (Bootherium sp.), giant moose-like deer (Cervalces scotti), caribou (Rangifer sp.), elk (Cervus canadensis), woolly mammoth (Elephas primigenius and Elephas columbi), and horse (Equus spp.). These fossils were dated to the Wisconsin Glacial Period (c. 115,000 – c. 11,700 years ago) and are now on display at the University of Nebraska State Museum. The team also found an Early Archaic spearpoint dated to between 8,000 and 10,000 years old.

Excavations in 1981 uncovered the burials of an adult male and a child, as well as a number of earth ovens and the remains of a house dating to the Late Archaic period. In 1993, an excavation uncovered stone tools, cores, and debitage, limestone tempered and shell tempered ceramics, fire-cracked rock, and faunal remains, including bison teeth. The tools and ceramics were recovered from a large pit and were determined to be Late Woodland and Fort Ancient types. The investigators concluded that the feature was "established and used by Late Woodland people, and that the locality was subsequently occupied by Fort Ancient people after an indeterminate period." It appears likely that Paleo-Indian groups visited the site to make salt by boiling brine, as salt was an important trade item.

=== History of the park ===
In 1950 the Boone County Historical Society was organized and began considering the possibility of creating a park in the area. The Big Bone Lick Historical Association was formed in 1953, and in 1956 purchased 16.66 acres of land, which they deeded to the Kentucky State Commissioner for conservation. In December 1960, the Kentucky Department of Parks began constructing picnic areas, a shelter, and a parking lot. By 1962, the purchase of additional land brought the size of the park to 175 acres. The park was listed in 1972 on the National Register of Historic Places. The Big Bone Lick Historic Site Museum was constructed in 1990 at a cost of $4 million. By 2000, the park had reached its current size of 512 acres.

In 2002, the National Park Service designated Big Bone Lick State Park as an official Lewis and Clark Heritage Trail Site. The park was listed as a National Natural Landmark in February 2009. It bills itself as "the birthplace of American paleontology". The park was further given National Historic Landmark designation in 2024.

== Activities and amenities ==
The visitors center (opened 2004) features indoor and outdoor exhibits of fossils, American art, and a 1,000 pound mastodon skull as well as a gift shop. Exhibits provide information on geology as well as Native American history.

The park features several nature trails, including a Discovery Trail that includes a boardwalk around a marsh bog diorama with recreations of a woolly mammoth, a mastodon, a ground sloth, bison, and scavengers feeding on carcasses and skeletal remains. The Discovery Trail winds through several habitats, including grassland, wetland and savanna, and is accessible to the physically challenged.

Grassland and open woods along a trail at Big Bone Lick State Park, Kentucky, 2026

A small bison herd is also maintained on-site.

The park has picnicking facilities and a 62-site campground.
