= Kentucky Route 20 =

State highway in Kentucky, United States

Kentucky Route 20
- KY 20 highlighted in red

Route information
- Maintained by KYTC
- Length: 20.725 mi (33.354 km)

Major junctions
- West end: KY 18 near Belleview
- KY 237 in Hebron; KY 212 in Hebron
- East end: KY 8 near Cincinnati-Northern Kentucky International Airport

Location
- Country: United States
- State: Kentucky
- Counties: Boone

Highway system
- Kentucky State Highway System; Interstate; US; State; Parkways
← KY 19	→ KY 21

Kentucky Route 20 (KY 20) is a 20.725-mile-long (33.354 km) state highway in Kentucky that runs from KY 18 north of Belleview to the middle segment of KY 8.

== Route description ==
KY 20 begins heading northwest. Near Petersburg, it heads northeast, before turning to the east in Petersburg. KY 20 meets the western segment of KY 8 and provides access to Interstate 275 west. KY 20 merges to the right and passes through Idlewild. KY 20 meets KY 212 just north of the Cincinnati-Northern Kentucky Airport. KY 212 provides access to Interstate 275 east. KY 20 (Petersburg Road) is the last exit on I-275 West in Kentucky before reaching the Indiana state line. KY 20 descends into the Ohio Valley and comes to an end at the middle segment of KY 8 west of Villa Hills.

== Major intersections ==
The entire route is in Boone County.

Location	mi	km	Destinations	Notes
Belleview	0.000	0.000	KY 18 (Burlington Pike)	
Idlewild	10.873	17.498	KY 3608 east (Idlewild Bypass) to I-275	
Idlewild	11.221	18.058	KY 338 (Idlewild Road)	
Hebron	16.620	26.747	KY 237 (North Bend Road)	
Hebron	19.708	31.717	KY 212 south (Terminal Drive) to I-275 / I-71 / I-75 – Airport, Hebron, Lawrenceburg, IN	
Hebron	20.725	33.354	KY 8 (River Road) – Taylorsport, Ludlow, McGlasson Farms, Historic Anderson Ferry	
1.000 mi = 1.609 km; 1.000 km = 0.621 mi
