= Limaburg, Kentucky =

Unincorporated community in Kentucky, United States

Coordinates: 39°01′12″N 84°41′14″W

Limaburg is an unincorporated community in Boone County, in the U.S. state of Kentucky.

== History ==
A post office was established at Limaburg in 1885, and remained in operation until 1907 The name of the post office was spelled "Limaburgh" from 1885 to 1894. According to tradition, the community was named after "Lima", the native home of a share of the first settlers.
