= Hebron, Kentucky =

Unincorporated community in Kentucky, United States

- Census-designated place (CDP)
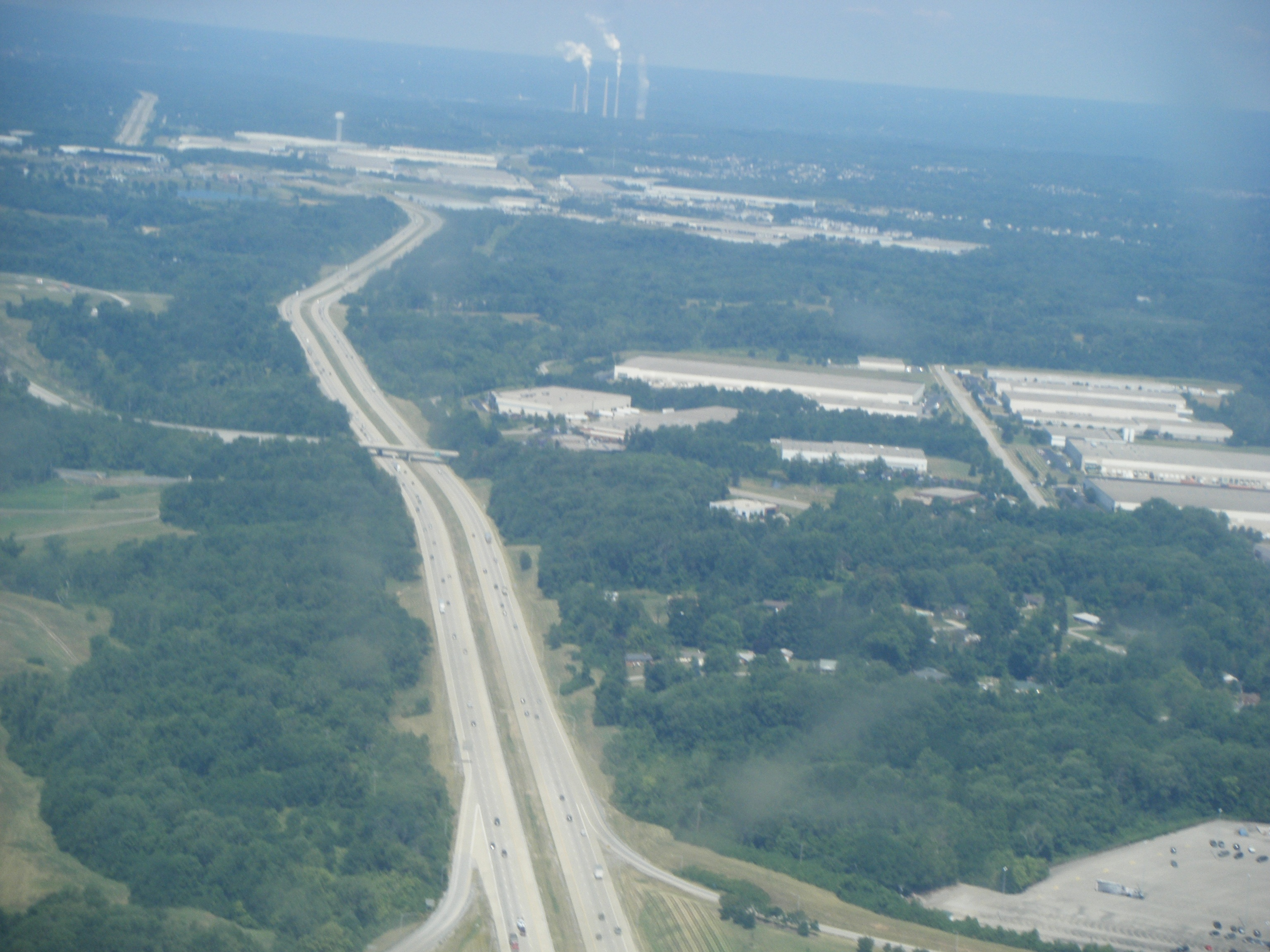
- Area around Hebron, Kentucky

- Location within Boone County and the state of Kentucky
- Coordinates: 39°03′45″N 84°42′35″W
- Country: United States
- State: Kentucky
- County: Boone

Area
  - Total: 6.43 sq mi (16.65 km^{2})
  - Land: 6.42 sq mi (16.62 km^{2})
  - Water: 0.012 sq mi (0.03 km^{2})
- Elevation: 896 ft (273 m)

Population (2020)
  - Total: 6,195
  - Density: 965.1/sq mi (372.64/km^{2})
- Time zone: UTC-5 (Eastern (EST))
  - Summer (DST): UTC-4 (EDT)
- ZIP codes: 41048
- Area code: (859)
- FIPS code: 21-35542
- GNIS feature ID: 2629628

Hebron (/ˈhiːbrən/) is an unincorporated community and census-designated place (CDP) in Boone County, Kentucky, United States. It is named after Hebron Lutheran Church.

As of the 2020 census, it had a population of 6,195. The wider Hebron area is home to the Cincinnati/Northern Kentucky International Airport, which serves Cincinnati and the Tri-State (Ohio-Kentucky-Indiana) area.

Hebron is the site of several corporate centers of operation and distribution, including Amazon, Wayfair, and DHL.

== History ==
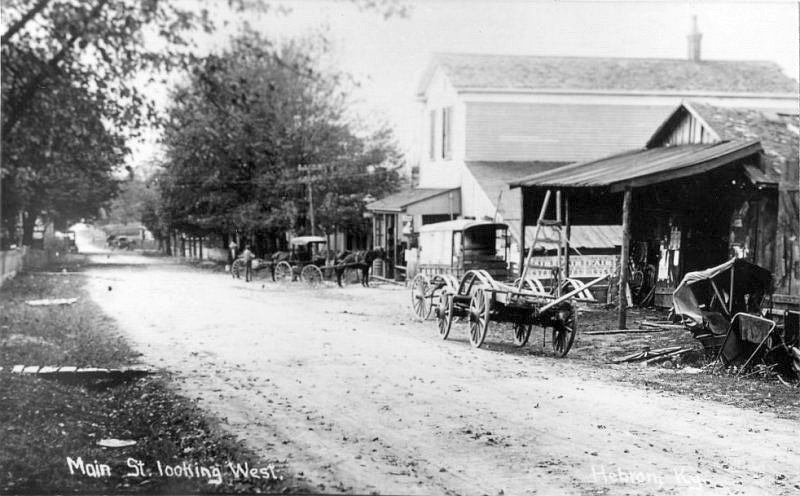
Hebron, c. 1910

Previously known as Briar Thicket and possibly Hecla, the community post office established in 1858 was named for the local Hebron Lutheran Church.

== Geography ==
Hebron is located in northern Boone County, on the western edge of the Cincinnati–Covington suburbs. Interstate 275 forms the northern edge of the CDP, with the CDP of Francisville to the north. The center of Hebron is the area around the intersection of Kentucky Route 20 and Kentucky Route 237, located 3 miles (5 km) west of the entrance to Cincinnati/Northern Kentucky International Airport. Downtown Cincinnati is 16 miles (26 km) to the east of Hebron by I-275 and I-75/71.

According to the U.S. Census Bureau, Hebron has a total area of 6.4 square miles (16.7 km^{2}), of which 0.012 square miles (0.03 km^{2}), or 0.18%, is water.

== Demographics ==
Historical population
Census	Pop.	Note	%±
2000	10,066		—
2010	5,929		−41.1%
2020	6,195		4.5%
U.S. Decennial Census

=== 2020 census ===
As of the 2020 census, Hebron had a population of 6,195. The median age was 32.8 years. 32.2% of residents were under the age of 18 and 7.1% of residents were 65 years of age or older. For every 100 females there were 96.0 males, and for every 100 females age 18 and over there were 94.4 males age 18 and over.

97.9% of residents lived in urban areas, while 2.1% lived in rural areas.

There were 2,015 households in Hebron, of which 48.7% had children under the age of 18 living in them. Of all households, 57.6% were married-couple households, 13.8% were households with a male householder and no spouse or partner present, and 19.4% were households with a female householder and no spouse or partner present. About 13.9% of all households were made up of individuals and 4.6% had someone living alone who was 65 years of age or older.

There were 2,071 housing units, of which 2.7% were vacant. The homeowner vacancy rate was 0.9% and the rental vacancy rate was 4.0%.

Racial composition as of the 2020 census
Race	Number	Percent
White	5,224	84.3%
Black or African American	276	4.5%
American Indian and Alaska Native	13	0.2%
Asian	58	0.9%
Native Hawaiian and Other Pacific Islander	11	0.2%
Some other race	138	2.2%
Two or more races	475	7.7%
Hispanic or Latino (of any race)	329	5.3%

=== 2010 census ===
Hebron became a Census Designated Place with the 2010 Census.

=== 2000 census ===
Before that designation change, Hebron was a CCD (Census County Division) in the 2000 census and earlier, and the boundaries were different.

== Media ==
Hebron is served by one daily newspaper, The Kentucky Enquirer (an edition of The Cincinnati Enquirer), and by one weekly newspaper, The Boone County Recorder. Hebron is also served by twelve television stations and many radio stations as part of the Greater Cincinnati media market.

== In popular culture ==
Movies that were filmed in part in Hebron include Airborne, which shows portions of KY 8 and KY 20.

== Corporate centers ==
Hebron is home to a number of centers of corporate operations and distribution including:

- Amazon.com regional fulfillment center (4 of 15 nationwide)
- Wayfair fulfillment center
- DHL eCommerce distribution center
- Anderson Manufacturing, a manufacturer of rifles, parts and accessories
- Verst Logistics, a contract packaging, sleeving, and transportation management facility that hosted a visit by President Donald Trump in March 2026.

== Transportation ==
=== Air ===
Hebron is served by Cincinnati/Northern Kentucky International Airport (IATA: CVG, ICAO: KCVG, FAA LID: CVG), which is a hub for DHL Aviation as well as a focus city for Allegiant Air, Frontier Airlines, and Sun Country Airlines.

Various articles of the Cincinnati Enquirer describe the airport as being in Hebron. However, the airport is in an unincorporated area of the county. While the airport terminal uses a Hebron postal address, it is outside of Hebron's limits as defined by the U.S. Census Bureau.

=== Highways ===
Hebron is served by one major interstate highway. Interstate 275 is an outer-belt highway through Northern Kentucky.

It is also served by numerous state highways: Kentucky Route 237 (North Bend Road), Kentucky Route 20 (Petersburg Road), and formerly Kentucky Route 3168 (Limaburg Road).

ARTIMIS is Greater Cincinnati's interstate information service. Current highway conditions are available 24/7 locally by dialing 511. For out-of-town drivers or "511"-disabled phone systems, one can call 513-333-3333.

In 2010, work on the KY 237 bridge over I-275 finished, with additional sidewalk and storm drain work.

=== Bus service ===
Hebron is served by the Transit Authority of Northern Kentucky (TANK) which serves Northern Kentucky and operates bus links in Cincinnati at Metro's main Government Square hub.

== Historic places ==
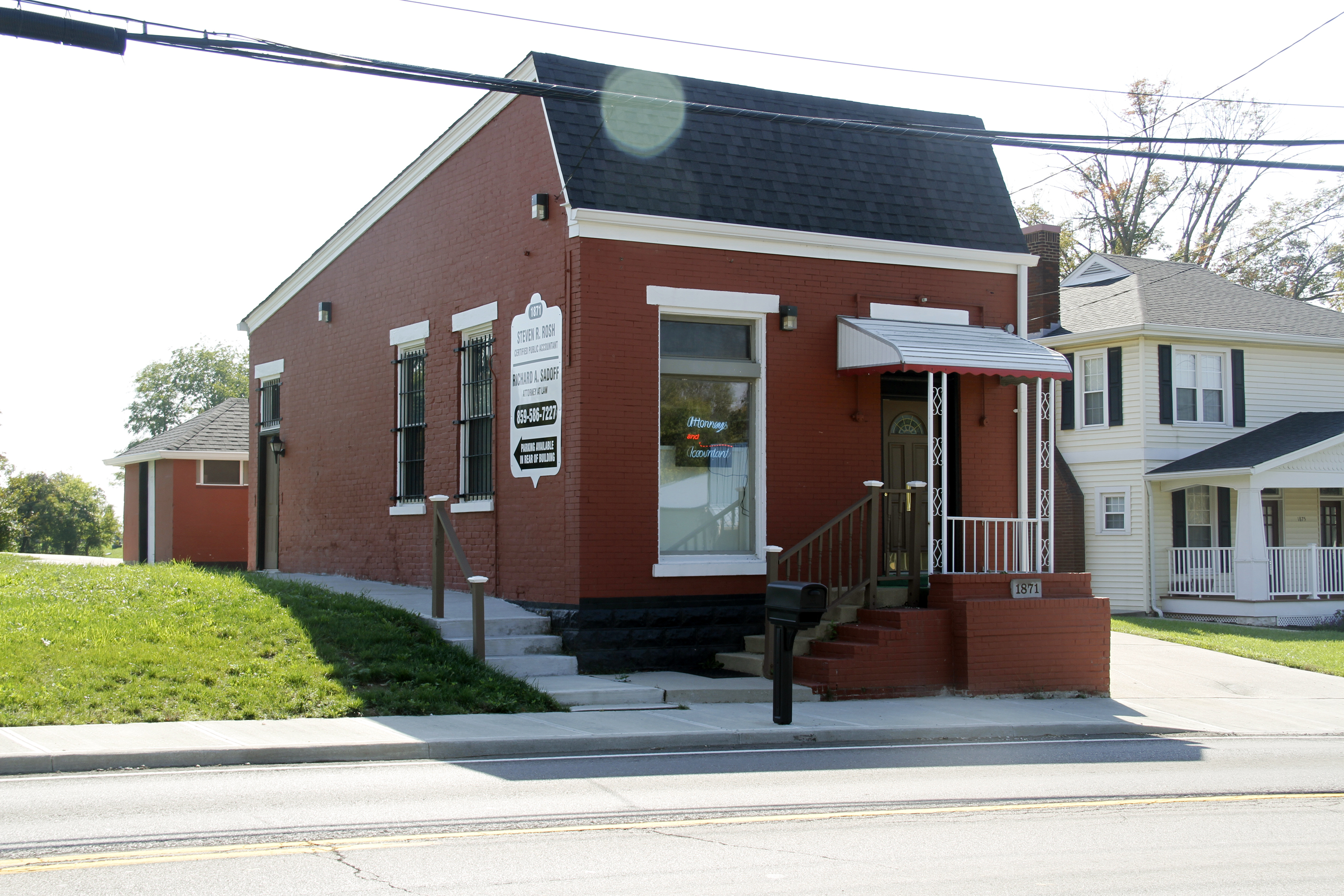
Hebron Deposit Bank

The following have been listed on the National Register of Historic Places:

- J.M. Aylor House
- Allie Corn House
- Cave Johnson House
- Crisler-Crisler Mounds Site
- Hebron Deposit Bank
- Rev. Robert E. Kirtley House

== Notable people ==
- Geoff Davis, U.S. Representative, Kentucky's 4th congressional district
- Jason Johnson, Major League Baseball pitcher
- Max Montoya, former NFL guard for Cincinnati Bengals and Oakland Raiders
- Pat O'Brien, lead guitarist for American death metal band, Cannibal Corpse

== Schools ==
Public schools are part of Boone County Schools.

- Conner High School
- Conner Middle School
- Goodridge Elementary School
- North Pointe Elementary School
- Thornwilde Elementary School
