= Richwood, Kentucky =

Unincorporated community in Kentucky, United States

Coordinates: 38.9206183°N 84.6249440°W

Richwood is an unincorporated community in Boone County, in the U.S. state of Kentucky.

== History ==
A post office called Richwood was established in 1859, and remained in operation until 1918. The community may have the name of the local Rich family.
