= Burlington, Kentucky =

Census-designated place in Boone County, Kentucky, United States

- Census-designated place
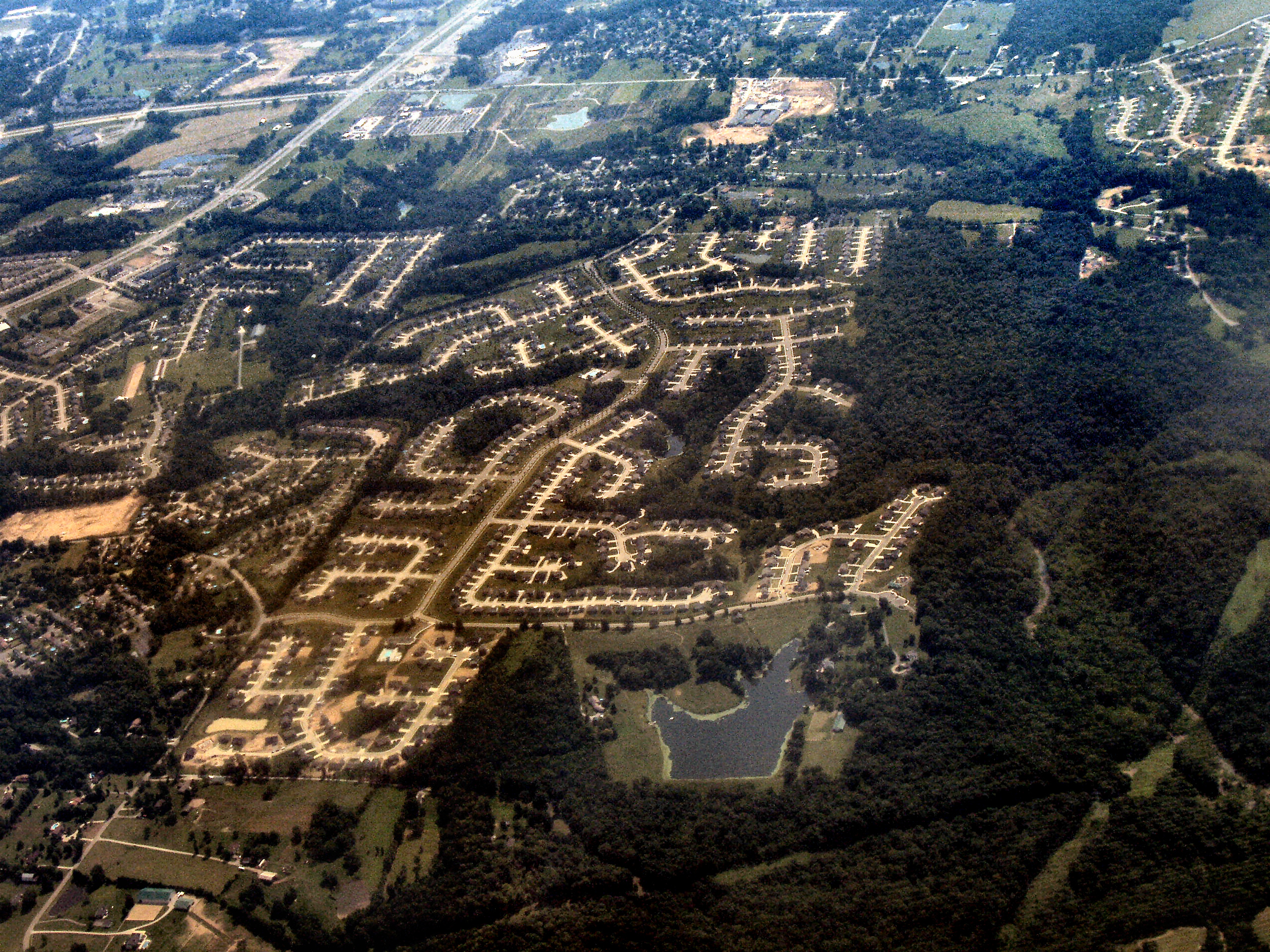
- Burlington from the air, looking east

- Location within Boone County and the state of Kentucky
- Coordinates: 39°01′20″N 84°43′18″W
- Country: United States
- State: Kentucky
- County: Boone

Area
  - Total: 8.81 sq mi (22.83 km^{2})
  - Land: 8.81 sq mi (22.83 km^{2})
  - Water: 0 sq mi (0.00 km^{2})
- Elevation: 830 ft (250 m)

Population (2020)
  - Total: 17,318 ▲
  - Density: 2,000/sq mi (770/km^{2})
- Time zone: UTC-5 (Eastern (EST))
  - Summer (DST): UTC-4 (EDT)
- ZIP code: 41005
- Area code: 859
- FIPS code: 21-11170
- GNIS feature ID: 2402734

Burlington is a census-designated place (CDP) in and the county seat of Boone County, Kentucky, United States. The population was 17,318 at the 2020 census.

== History ==
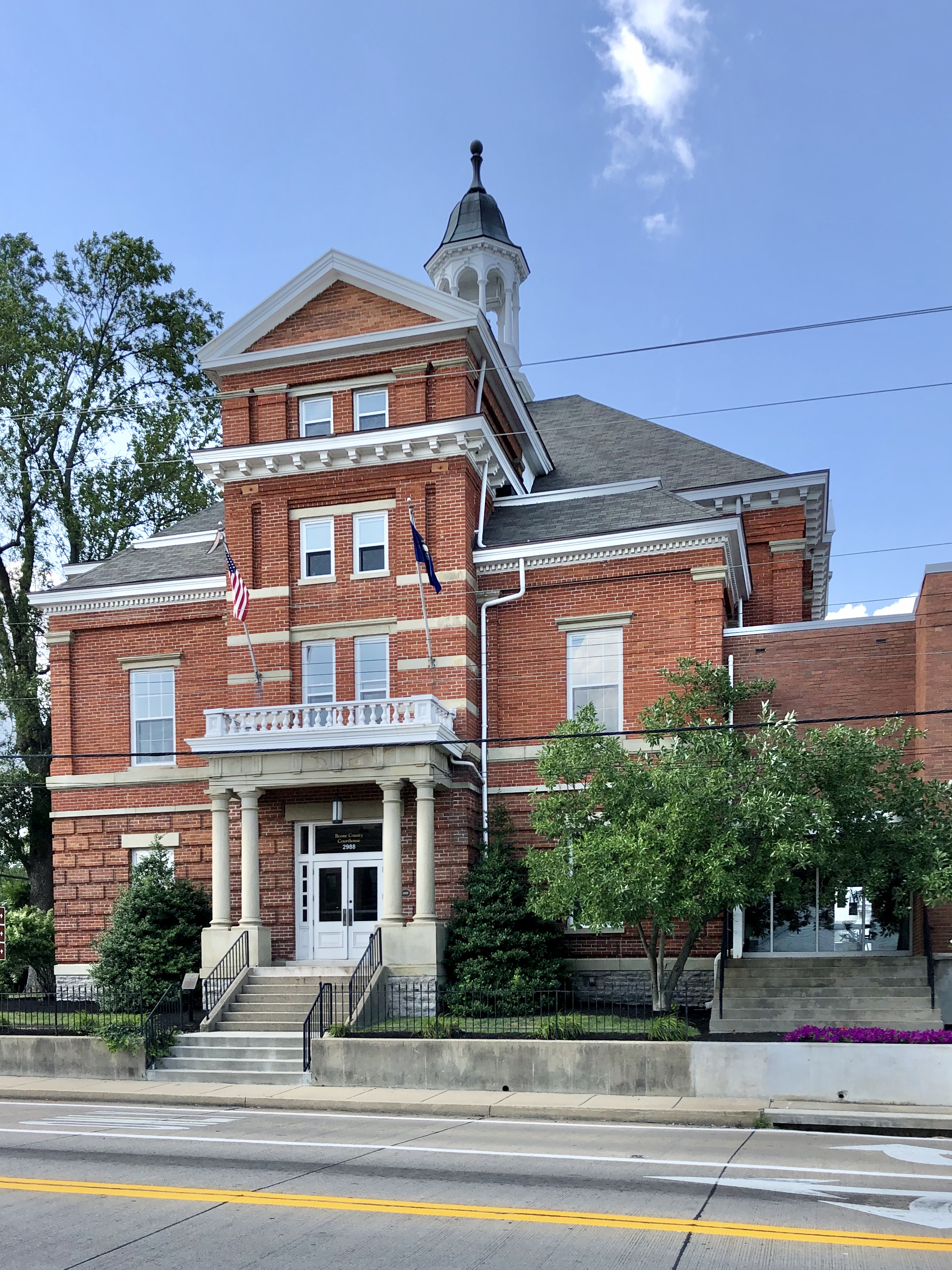
Boone County Courthouse, located in Historic Burlington district

Burlington was incorporated in 1824. However, today Burlington is unincorporated due to the annulment of the city charter in 1923. It is one of the two county seats in Kentucky that are unincorporated, along with Whitley City, the seat of McCreary County.

The county seat of Boone County, Burlington, was initially established on 74 acres, donated by John Craig and Robert Johnson, at the headwaters of the Allen's Fork. It went through various name changes, originally known as Craig's Camp after John Craig, then renamed Wilmington in 1800, and is now known as Burlington, a function of the request of the U.S. Post Office in 1816. Court was initially held in a log courthouse built in 1801, the same year the town was platted. In the initial layout of the town, the streets circled the central "Publick Square." It was this original town plan and square, designed by county surveyor Moses Scott, that would later contribute to the listing of Burlington as a historic district on the National Register of Historic Places. The Burlington Historic District was added to the National Register of Historic Places in 1979.

== Geography ==
Burlington is located in north-central Boone County. Kentucky Route 18 (Burlington Pike) runs through the center of the CDP, leading east 6 miles (10 km) to Florence and west 7 miles (11 km) to the Ohio River at Belleview. Downtown Cincinnati is 16 miles (26 km) to the northeast, and Cincinnati/Northern Kentucky International Airport is directly to the northeast of Burlington.

According to the United States Census Bureau, Burlington has a total area of 8.8 square miles (22.9 km^{2}), all land.

=== Climate ===
The climate in this area is characterized by hot, humid summers and generally mild to cool winters. According to the Köppen Climate Classification system, Burlington has a humid subtropical climate, abbreviated "Cfa" on climate maps. It could also be classified as a hot-summer humid continental climate, which is abbreviated as "Dfa." Record temperatures for Burlington are unknown as well as averages, because it does not have a weather station; information comes from nearby counties.

== Demographics ==
Historical population
Census	Pop.	Note	%±
2000	10,779		—
2010	15,926		47.8%
2020	17,318		8.7%
U.S. Decennial Census

=== 2020 census ===
As of the 2020 census, Burlington had a population of 17,318. The median age was 36.9 years. 24.1% of residents were under the age of 18 and 13.1% of residents were 65 years of age or older. For every 100 females there were 101.6 males, and for every 100 females age 18 and over there were 100.3 males age 18 and over.

99.6% of residents lived in urban areas, while 0.4% lived in rural areas.

There were 6,312 households in Burlington, of which 34.2% had children under the age of 18 living in them. Of all households, 52.2% were married-couple households, 16.2% were households with a male householder and no spouse or partner present, and 24.5% were households with a female householder and no spouse or partner present. About 23.7% of all households were made up of individuals and 8.7% had someone living alone who was 65 years of age or older.

There were 6,551 housing units, of which 3.6% were vacant. The homeowner vacancy rate was 0.9% and the rental vacancy rate was 5.0%.

Racial composition as of the 2020 census
Race	Number	Percent
White	14,778	85.3%
Black or African American	767	4.4%
American Indian and Alaska Native	34	0.2%
Asian	255	1.5%
Native Hawaiian and Other Pacific Islander	57	0.3%
Some other race	311	1.8%
Two or more races	1,116	6.4%
Hispanic or Latino (of any race)	809	4.7%

=== Demographic estimates ===
According to the 2020 American Community Survey, the average household size was 2.78. The median household income was $86,651, and 5.6% of the population was estimated to be below the poverty level. Using race-alone-or-in-combination statistics, the racial makeup of Burlington was 94.9% White, 5.3% Black or African American, 1.6% American Indian and Alaska Native, 1.5% Asian, and 1.3% some other race; 5.9% of the population identified as Hispanic or Latino of any race.

=== 2000 census ===
At the 2000 census there were 10,779 people in 3,799 households, including 2,887 families, in the CDP. The population density was 1,276.0 inhabitants per square mile (492.7/km^{2}). There were 4,083 housing units at an average density of 483.4 per square mile (186.6/km^{2}). The racial makeup of Burlington in 2006 was 93.9% White, 1.89% African American, 0.6% Native American, 1.11% Asian, 0.01% Pacific Islander, 0.94% from other races, and 1.06% from two or more races. Hispanic or Latino of any race were 1.73%.

Of the 3,799 households 42.9% had children under the age of 18 living with them, 62.3% were married couples living together, 10.2% had a female householder with no husband present, and 24.0% were non-families. 19.0% of households were one person and 3.9% were one person aged 65 or older. The average household size was 2.77 and the average family size was 3.19.

The age distribution was 30.1% under the age of 18, 9.8% from 18 to 24, 36.3% from 25 to 44, 18.2% from 45 to 64, and 5.7% 65 or older. The median age was 31 years. For every 100 females, there were 104.1 males. For every 100 females age 18 and over, there were 101.3 males.

The median household income was $56,815 and the median family income was $63,387. Males had a median income of $41,083 versus $28,288 for females. The per capita income for the CDP was $22,806. About 2.3% of families and 2.6% of the population were below the poverty line, including 3.0% of those under age 18 and 1.4% of those age 65 or over.

== Education ==
Burlington has a public library, a branch of the Boone County Public Library.

Burlington is also home to four public schools in the Boone County Schools district, Burlington Elementary School, Charles H. Kelly Elementary School, Stephens Elementary School, and Camp Ernst Middle School.

== Attractions ==
- Dinsmore Homestead - A living history museum of the prominent Dinsmore family antebellum farm. The 700 acres of the homestead were purchased in 1839 and the main house was built in 1842. The Greek Revival style main house and 30 acres were donated by Martha Breasted in 1988 to the Dinsmore Homestead Foundation to develop the living history museum, displaying the well-preserved site of five generations of Dinsmores and the history of the home's enslaved peoples and laborers.
- Old Boone County Courthouse – Built in 1889, designed by the McDonald brothers in a Renaissance Revival style and is listed in the National Register of Historic Places as part of the Burlington Historic District. Having undergone various repairs and updates, it continues to operate as a public space and is still used for a few county operations.

== Notable people ==
- Mamie Claflin (1867–1929), American temperance and suffrage leader
