= List of United States Air Force air control squadrons =

A United States Air Force air control squadron is a group assigned to provide combat air control services in the form of radar, surveillance identification, weapons control, Battle Management and theater communications data link to the forces or area it is assigned to. This list contains squadrons inactive, active, and historical.

== List ==
Squadron	Shield	Location	Nickname/Motto/"Callsign"	Note
9th Expeditionary Air Control Squadron		Ali Al Salem Air Base, Kuwait		Closed
71st Expeditionary Air Control Squadron		Al Udeid AB, Qatar	"Pyramid"	Inactivated 1 November 2014
71st Air Control Squadron		Moody Air Force Base, Georgia	"Alley Cats"	Inactivated March 2000
73d Expeditionary Air Control Squadron		Kandahar Airfield, Afghanistan	Eyes of the Sword/"Double Dagger"	Closed
74th Air Control Squadron		Langley Air Force Base, Virginia	Mobile and Ready	Closed
81st Air Control Squadron		Tyndall Air Force Base, Florida	"Wetstone"	
83d Air Control Squadron		Holloman Air Force Base, New Mexico	"Scorpions"	Closed
101st Air Control Squadron		Worcester ANG Station, Massachusetts	Pro Pace Mundi	Inactivated 16 Oct 1998
102d Air Control Squadron		North Smithfield, Rhode Island	Povocationem Suscepimus/"Roadstead"	Control and Reporting Center, Inactivated 13 September 1998
103d Air Control Squadron		Orange ANG Station, Connecticut	Yankee Watch/"Heckler"	Control and Reporting Center, Retired callsigns: "Footrope"
104th Air Control Squadron		Coos Head ANG Station, Oregon	"Unus Generis"/"Shadow"	Inactivated 30 September 1996
105th Air Control Squadron		Four Lakes, Washington	What You See It What You Get/"Big Willy"	Closed
106th Air Control Squadron		Salt Lake City, Utah	Ace Maker	Control and Reporting Post Inactivated 31 Dec 1995
107th Air Control Squadron		Luke AFB, Arizona	Prepared in All Things/"Autumn"	Inactivated 30 Sep 2012
108th Air Control Squadron		Hancock Field Air National Guard Base, New York	"Incognito"	Inactivated 16 Feb 1994
109th Air Control Squadron		Salt Lake City, Utah	"Warlock"	Control and Reporting Center
110th Air Control Squadron		Alcoa ANG Station, Tennessee	"Clear"	Closed
112th Air Control Squadron		State College, Pennsylvania		Closed
113th Air Control Squadron		Syracuse, New York		Closed
115th Air Control Squadron		Hall Air National Guard Station, Dothan, Alabama		Inactivated 1 January 1996
116th Air Control Squadron		Camp Rilea, Warrenton, Oregon	"Longracks"	Control and Reporting Center
117th Air Control Squadron		Hunter Army Airfield, Savannah, Georgia	"Stealth Control"	Control and Reporting Center
118th Air Control Squadron		Kennesaw, Georgia		Inactivated November 1996
119th Air Control Squadron		Alcoa ANG Station, Tennessee	Fortuna Favet Fortibus	Redesignated 16 August 2002
121st Air Control Squadron		Jefferson Barracks, Missouri	"Vigilant"	Closed
123d Air Control Squadron		Blue Ash Air Station, Ohio	One Team One Fight/"Blue Ash"	Control and Reporting Center
124th Air Control Squadron		Blue Ash Air Station, Ohio		Closed
128th Air Control Squadron		Volk Field ANGB, Wisconsin	Strength Through Vigilance/"Brewtown"	Control and Reporting Center
129th Air Control Squadron		Malcolm McKinnon Airfield, Brunswick, Georgia		Redesignated 10 Oct 1996
133d Air Control Squadron		Fort Dodge, Iowa	"Coffin Corner"	Control and Reporting Element Redesignated 2002
134th Air Control Squadron		Wichita, Kansas	"Jayhawk Control"	Control and Reporting Center
138th Air Control Squadron		Buckley ANG Base, Colorado	"Ghost Riders"	Forward Air Control Post, Inactivated
141st Air Control Squadron		Aguadilla, Puerto Rico	Ever Vigilant/"Quijotes"	Control and Reporting Center
154th Air Control Squadron		Pacific Missile Range Facility, Waimea, Hawaii		Control and Reporting Element Closed
176th Air Control Squadron		Elmendorf AFB, Alaska	Eyes of the North/"Top Rock"	Reorganized as 176th Air Defense Squadron
255th Air Control Squadron		Gulfport Combat Readiness Training Center, Mississippi	"Guard Dog"	Control and Reporting Center
325th Air Control Squadron		Tyndall AFB, Florida	Screamin' Eagles/"Hydra"	Inactivated 2012, Retired callsigns: "Backdraft", "Sideshow"
332d Expeditionary Air Control Squadron		Balad Air Base, Iraq	"Kingpin"	Control and Reporting Center, Closed
337th Air Control Squadron		Tyndall AFB, Florida	Imperio et Moderatio/"Doghouse"	Training Squadron.
386th Expeditionary Air Control Squadron		Ali Al Salem Air Base, Kuwait	"Absolut"	Closed
601st Air Control Squadron		Alzey Air Station (Annex of Sembach Air Base), Germany	Die Adleraugen	Inactivated 31 Mar 1995
603d Air Control Squadron		Aviano AB, Italy	Fide et Animo/"Primo"	Used by 606th Air Control Squadron
606th Air Control Squadron		Aviano AB, Italy	Inspector of the Skies/"Primo"	Control and Reporting Center; Relocated to Aviano AB. Retired Spangdahlem AB callsign "Galley"
607th Air Control Squadron		Luke AFB, Arizona	Always Ready/"Venom"	Training Squadron
610th Air Control Flight		Misawa Air Base, Japan	"Sabre"	
611th Air Control Squadron		Elmendorf AFB, Alaska	Eyes of the North	Inactivated 1 October 2004
619th Air Control Squadron		Schwelentrup, Germany	Vis A Tergo	inactivated 1 August 1985
621st Air Control Squadron		Osan Air Base, Republic of Korea	Pro-Observatio Positiva/"Cobras"	US Air Forces Korea Command and Control Element
623d Air Control Squadron		Kadena Air Base, Japan	Fightin' Yagis/Semper Vigilantes/"Lightsword"	Previously 623d Air Control Flight
624th Air Control Flight		Fuchu Air Base (JASDF), Japan	"Plughat"	Relocated to Yokota Air Base, Japan. Reorganized as 5 AF Air Defense Liaison Element
626th Air Control Squadron		Bremerhaven Army Airfield, Germany		Closed
726th Air Control Squadron		Mountain Home Air Force Base, Idaho	"Hardrock"	Control and Reporting Center
727th Expeditionary Air Control Squadron		Undisclosed Location, Southwest Asia	"Kingpin"	Control and Reporting Center
728th Air Control Squadron		Eglin Air Force Base, Florida	Poised for Peace/"Demons"	Closed
729th Air Control Squadron		Hill Air Force Base, Utah	Best in the Field/"Angry Warriors"	Control and Reporting Center
932d Air Control Squadron		Keflavik Air Station, Iceland	"Loki"	Closed
4414th Air Control Squadron (Provisional)		Ali Al Salem Air Base, Kuwait		Redesignated December 1998 (9th Expeditionary Air Control Squadron)
