= 103 Squadron =

103 Squadron may refer to:

- 103 Squadron (Israel)
- 103 Squadron (Portugal)
- 103rd Squadron (JASDF), Japan
- No. 103 Squadron RAF, United Kingdom
- 103 Search and Rescue Squadron, Canada
- 103rd Aero Squadron, United States Army Air Service
- 103rd Air Control Squadron, United States Air Force
- 103rd Attack Squadron, Pennsylvania Air National Guard (formerly 103rd Observation Squadron, 103rd Bombardment Squadron, 103rd Air Transport Squadron, 103rd Fighter Squadron, among others)
- 103d Rescue Squadron, New York Air National Guard
- VFA-103 (Strike Fighter Squadron 103), United States Navy

== See also ==
- 103 (Tyne Electrical Engineers) Field Squadron
- 103 (Newcastle) Field Squadron, Royal Engineers
