= Cincinnati Airport =

Cincinnati Airport may refer to the following airports that serve Cincinnati, Ohio, United States:

- Cincinnati/Northern Kentucky International Airport (IATA: CVG, ICAO: KCVG)
- Cincinnati Municipal Lunken Airport (IATA: LUK, ICAO: KLUK, FAA LID: LUK)
- Cincinnati–Blue Ash Airport (ICAO: KISZ, FAA LID: ISZ)
