= 607th Air Control Squadron =

US Air Force Squadron

Coordinates: 33.5412°N 112.3754°W

607th Air Control Squadron (ACS)

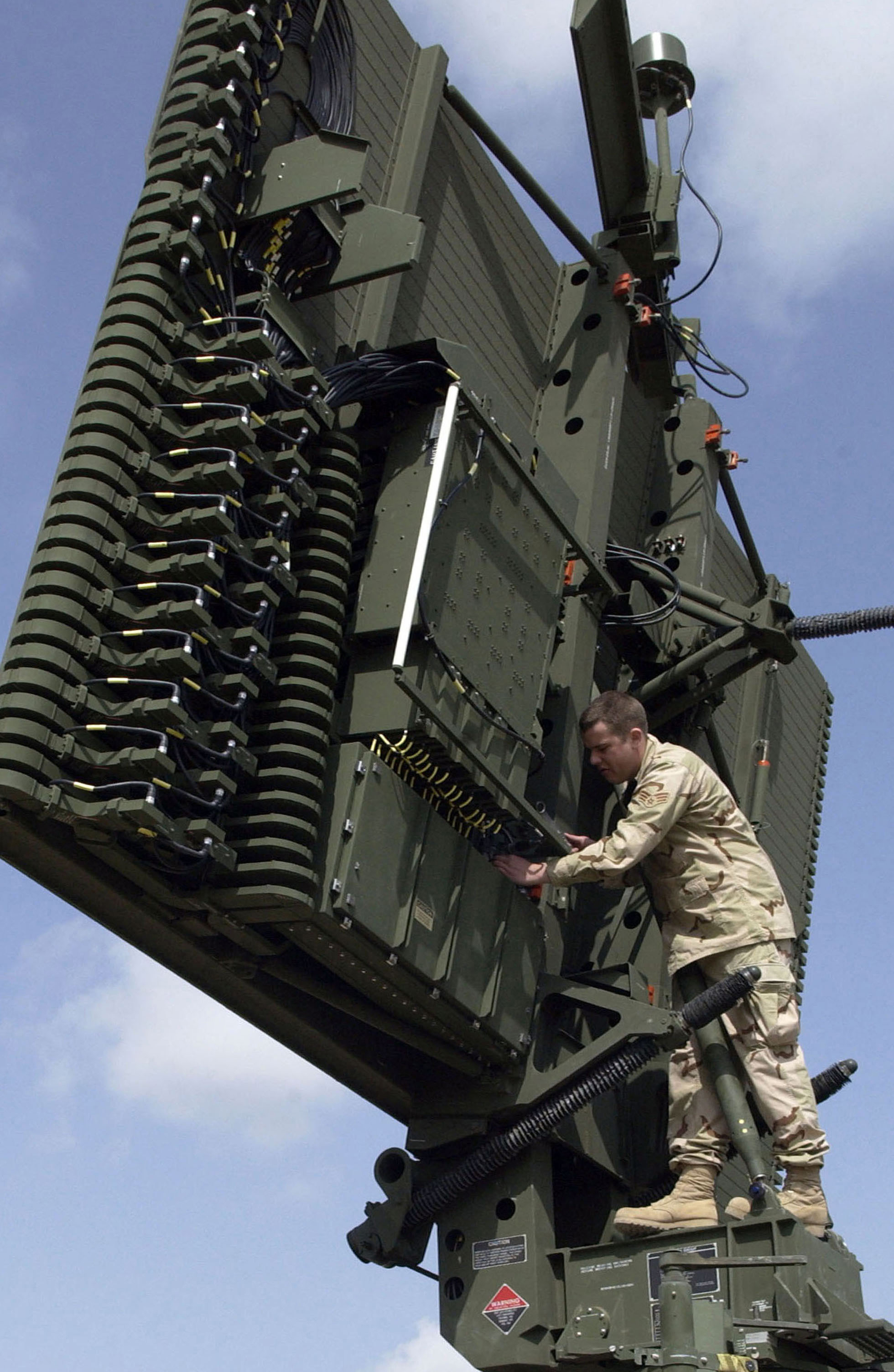
- AN/TPS-75 radar
- Active: 1945-1957; 1969-present
- Country: United States
- Branch: United States Air Force
- Type: Command and Control
- Role: Control and Reporting Center (CRC)
- Part of: Air Education and Training Command
- Garrison/HQ: Luke Air Force Base
- Nickname: Venom
- Motto: Always Ready
- Colors: Ultramarine Blue & Air Force Gold
- Mascot: Sidewinder Snake
- Decorations: Distinguished Unit Citations (Korea) (2x) Air Force Outstanding Unit Awards (12x) Republic of Korea Presidential Unit Citations (2x)
- Campaign Streamers: Korea: UN Offensive CCF Intervention First UN Counteroffensive CCF Spring Offensive UN Summer-Fall Offensive Second Korean Winter Korea, Summer-Fall, 1952 Third Korean Winter Korea, Summer, 1953 Southwest Asia: Ceasefire

Commanders
- Commander: Lt Col. Ryan "Scumper" Hutton
- Director of Operations (DO): Lt Col. Bryce "Rock" Hardt
- Senior Enlisted Leader (SEL): CMSgt(S) Rebecca "Smash" Macfadden

Insignia
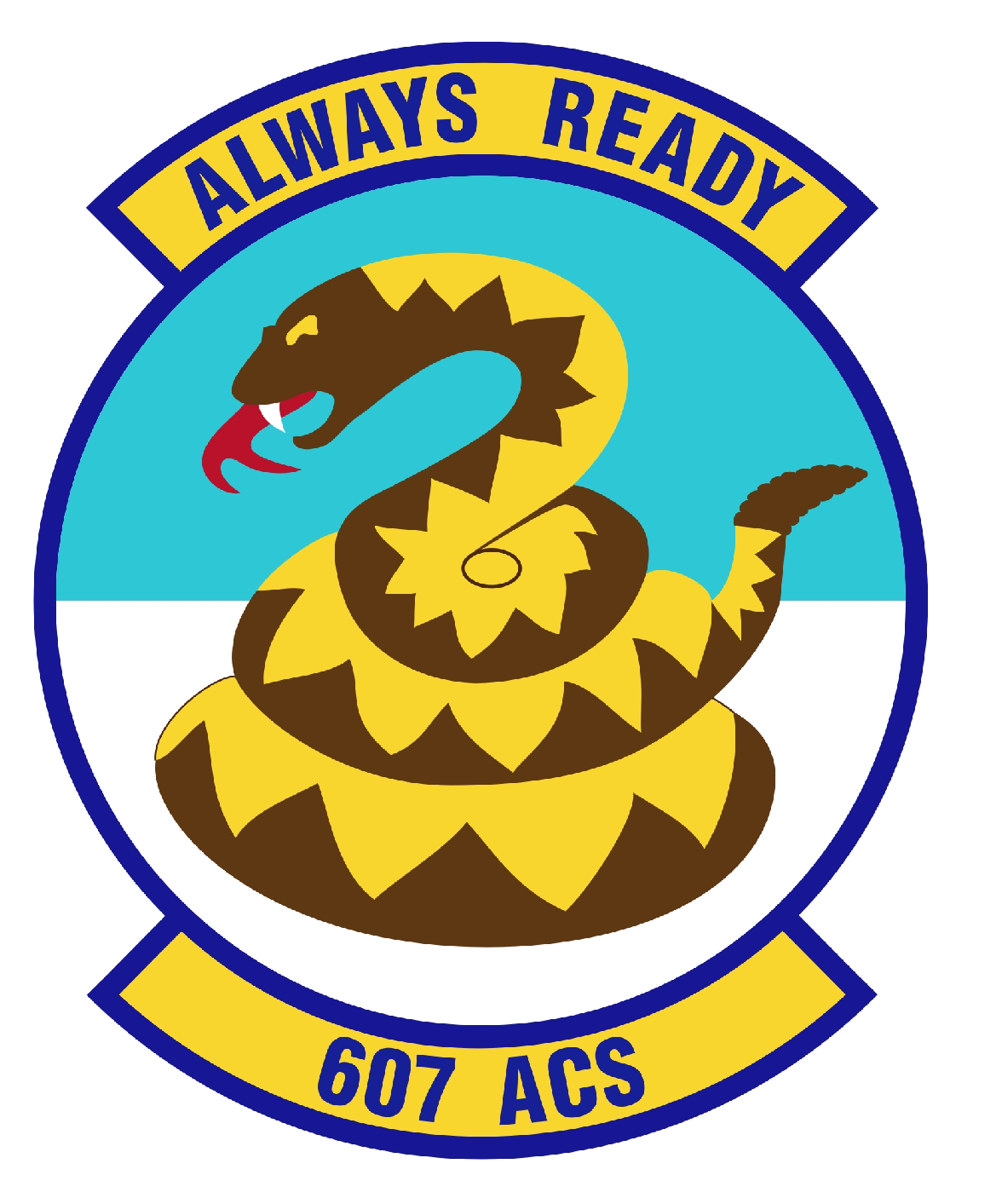
- 607th Air Control Squadron emblem

The 607th Air Control Squadron (ACS) is a unit of the 56th Operations Group, 56th Fighter Wing at Luke Air Force Base in Arizona. Its primary mission is to train Airmen to perform key roles in command and control operations around the world. The 607th ACS is known for its training and collaboration with other nations, and for its role in training Airmen for the Control and Reporting Center career field. The 607th Air Control Squadron trains Air Battle Managers, Mission Systems Operators and Weapons Directors in preparation to fight our nation's next war and stand in support of future CAF training needs. The 607 Air Control Squadron provides in-garrison radar control to flying units operating in local airspace. It operates and maintains radar and communications worth $85M.

The 607 ACS supports 56th Fighter Wing aircrew training with radar control. It also supports the 355th Wing at Davis–Monthan Air Force Base, the 162nd Fighter Group at Tucson IAP, and the 944th Fighter Wing at Luke Air Force Base. To conduct formal initial qualification training for Air Control Squadron operations crew personnel in C2 tactics, techniques and procedures. To provide an understanding of theater level execution and increase mission effectiveness through mission crew and aircrew interface.

== History ==
=== Post World War II ===
The 502nd Tactical Control Group (TCG) was established on 15 December 1945. Within the 502 TCG were the 607th Aircraft Control & Warning (AC&W), 606th Aircraft Control & Warning (now 606th Air Control Squadron, Aviano, Italy) Squadrons. The unit consisted of 2,170 personnel. The primary focus of the 502 TCG was testing and evaluation of early warning radar for detection of adversary aircraft and control of friendly aircraft. In 1947, the 502 TCG was relocated to Greenville, SC and by mid 1947, the size of the squadron was reduced to 80 personnel with a mission set focused on aircraft control and interception. In August of that year, the squadron was relocated to Turner Air Force Base, GA.

=== Korean War ===
Upon the outbreak of the Korean War in 1950, the 607th Aircraft Control & Warning Squadron was mobilized and deployed to support United Nations forces. The squadron sent four radar sets (AN/TPS1B), a MPQ-12 radar, as well as radio jeeps to be used by the Tactical Air Control Parties (TACP). Due to the mishandling of equipment during the shipping process, much of the equipment was damaged. Some 5,000 boxes were utilized for all of the equipment and everything was hand packed.

Upon arrival in country, the equipment was then loaded onto rail to be sent to Daegu, where it was to be unloaded, packed onto trucks for the final journey to Seoul. This processes further exacerbated the already damaged and delicate equipment. Several members were injured or killed during the journey. The move from Busan took three trips and resulted in an ambush by North Korean forces, leaving two airmen killed and much of the equipment damaged.

By 14 October 1950, the 607 AC&W was established and operational at Kimpo Airfield, Korea. Despite the damaged equipment and attrition from the journey, the remainder of 1950 operations resulted in 1,370 navigational steers of friendly aircraft and 11 allied aircraft saved. Due to the mobility of the 607 AC&W, Detachment 1 of the squadron was established and progressed northward. By the end of October, 1950, the 607 AC&W Det 1 set up camp and established operations in Pyongyang, the capital city of North Korea. The remainder of the squadron continued to operate in Kimpo.

In early November, 1950, the 607 AC&W progressed further north to Anju. By this point, the squadron had moved to the Forward Edge of the Battle Area (FEBA). Despite having been assured that the area was secured in allied control, Major W. H. Wilkin ordered the radar and equipment be set up that evening. The following morning, the U.S. Eighth Army approached from the south and the commander informed Major Wilkin that the North Korean Army had only just left the area. The 607 AC&W remained in Anju for less than a month while they assisted the 606 AC&W with B-26 bombings northward up the Yalu River. As winter set in and the temperatures dropped to nearly −30 °F (−34 °C), much of the equipment and airmen struggled. None of the airmen were issued arctic weather gear and opted to wear multiple layers of uniforms to stay warm.

By the end of November, 1950 the Chinese People's Volunteer Army launched their overwhelming attack and forced the withdrawal of UN Forces southward. The airmen of Detachment 1, 607 AC&W packed their gear and began the withdrawal to Kimpo and by mid-December, all equipment was dismantled and airlifted to Daegu. All radar units within the 502 TCG (606 AC&W & 607 AC&W) were south of the 38th parallel.

By the end of December 1950, Detachment 2 of the 607 AC&W was established at Pohang. The detachment was equipped with a TPS-1B but lacked any height finding radar capabilities. By January 1951, UN Forces regained the initiative and Det 1 joined the offensive north toward Pyeongtaek. In March 1951, the 607 AC&W moved and set up headquarters at Yoju Airstrip, this time with CPS-5 and CPS-4 radars, allowing for early warning and height finding capabilities.

Summer of 1951 brought multiple bombing campaigns conducted by Martin B-26 Marauder and Boeing B-29 Superfortress bombers, mostly in darkness and inclement weather. The 607 AC&W provided command and control for these operations. In June of that year, the 607 AC&W provided intercept control for North American P-51 Mustang fighters which resulted in the shoot down of two enemy aircraft 65 miles north of their radar site at an altitude of 1,055 feet. On top of providing ground controlled intercepts and offensive air operations, the controllers of the 607 AC&W provided safe guidance and returns to friendly airfields for lost or battle damaged aircraft almost daily. Additionally, the controllers guided helicopters to rescue downed pilots, behind enemy lines. By July 1951, the 607 AC&W was responsible for control of all night fighters and anti-aircraft artillery in its area of responsibility (AOR).

In October 1957, the 607th Aircraft Control & Warning Squadron had been inactivated.

=== Post Vietnam era ===
In October 1979, the 607th Tactical Control Squadron (TCS) was activated at Tyndall Air Force Base in Panama City, Florida. Its primary mission was to establish and provide a standardized training for all controllers for the Combat Air Force (CAF).

=== Modern era ===
The 607th Air Control Squadron moved from Tyndall Air Force Base to Luke Air Force Base to be collocated with the 107th Air Control Squadron (Arizona Air National Guard), which had previously operated out of Papago Park in Phoenix, Arizona. The 107 ACS moved to Luke in 2009. The primary mission of the 107 ACS was to provide advanced training for Weapons Directors (WD). Together, the 107 ACS and 607 ACS provided training for controllers to the CAF before the 107 ACS was inactivated on 15 November 2013.

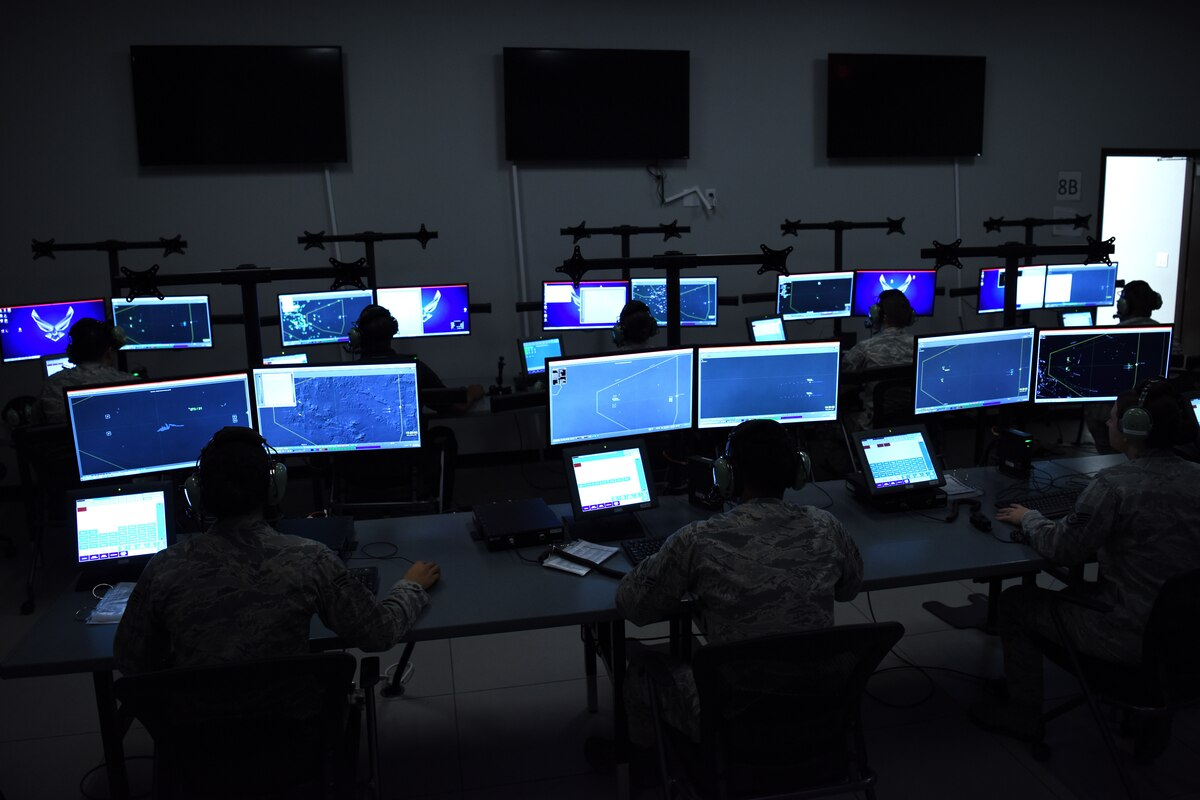
Tactical Operations Center (TOC)

The Control and Reporting Center integrated three distinct Air Force Specialty Codes (AFSC) into a unified career field, known as the Mission Systems Operator (MSO), in alignment with the objectives set forth by General Charles Brown Jr., Chief of Staff of the United States Air Force. Mission Systems Operators, now under the Multi-Capable Airmen Concept conduct the roles of Surveillance Technicians (ST), Interface Control Technicians (ICT) and Air Surveillance Technicians (AST).

In the summer of 2024, the 607th Air Control Squadron deployed a crew to Red Flag at Nellis Air Force Base, NV to operate and employ utilizing Tactical Operating Center-Lite (TOC-L), the future replacement to 23A CRC employment.

On 17 July 2026, the 607th Air Control Squadron was reassigned from the 56th Operations Group to the 479th Flying Training Group, headquartered at Naval Air Station Pensacola, Florida. The reassignment retained the squadron under Air Education and Training Command as the 56th Fighter Wing transitioned to Air Combat Command, preserving AETC oversight of the squadron’s Undergraduate Weapons Director training mission.

== Lineage ==
- Established as the 607th Tactical Control Squadron on 5 Dec 1945
- Activated on 15 Dec 1945
- Redesignated 607th Aircraft Control and Warning Squadron on 30 Jan 1946
- Inactivated on 1 Oct 1957
- Redesignated 607th Tactical Control Squadron on 13 Oct 1969
- Activated on 15 Oct 1969
- Redesignated 607th Tactical Control Training Squadron on 1 Oct 1979
- Redesignated 607th Air Control Squadron on 1 Nov 1991

== Assignments ==
- 502d Tactical Control Group, 15 Dec 1945-1 Oct 1957
- 602d Tactical Control Group (later, 602d Tactical Air Control Group, 602d Tactical Air Control Wing, 602d Air Control Wing), 15 Oct 1969
- 58th Operations Group, 1 May 1992
- 355th Operations Group, 1 Jul 1993
- 552d Air Control Group, 1 May 2008
- 56th Operations Group, 1 Jul 2013 – 16 Jul 2026
- 479th Flying Training Group, 16 Jul 2026 - Present
