= List of surviving LTV A-7 Corsair IIs =

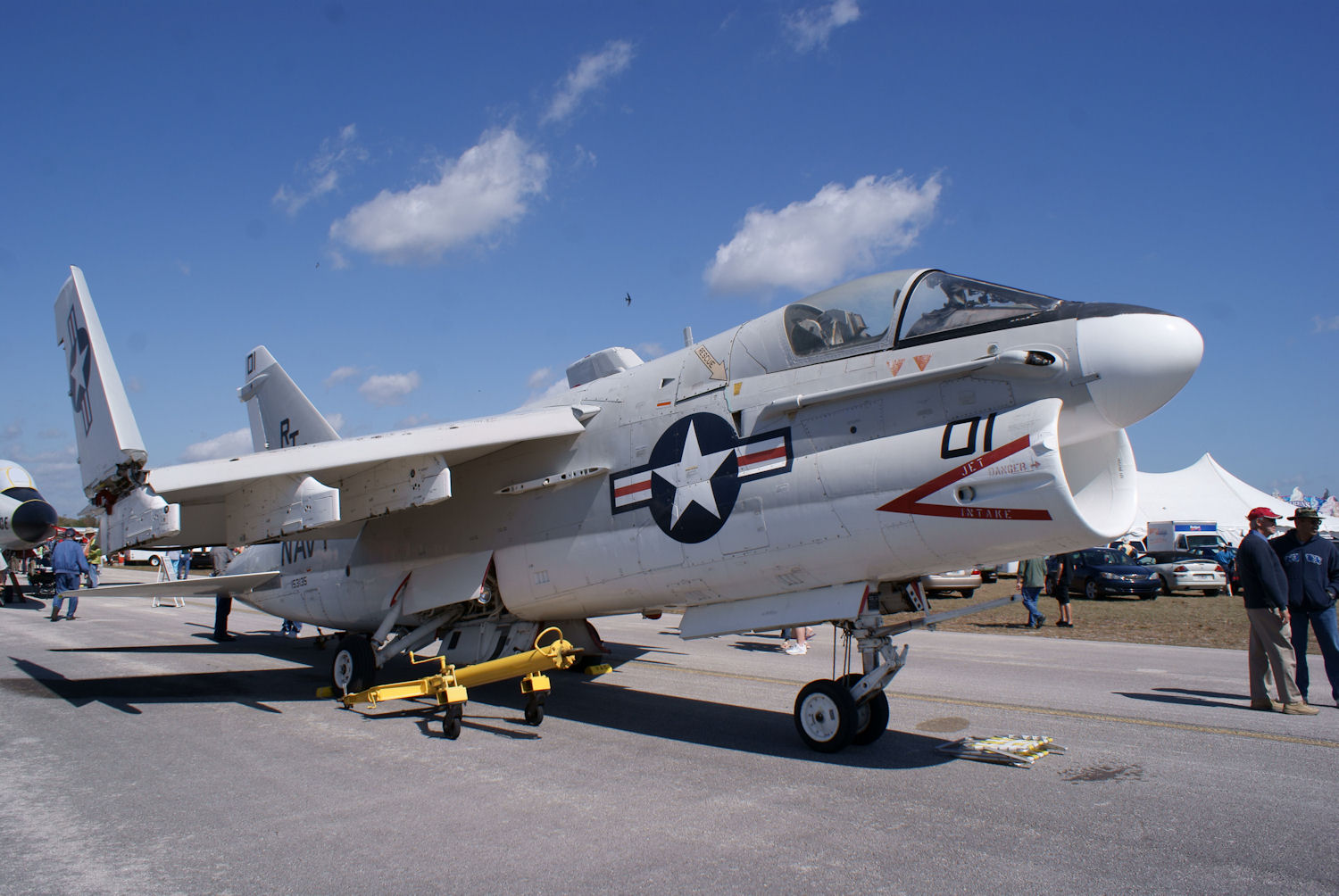
A-7A Bur No. 153135 on display at the Valiant Air Command Warbird Museum, Titusville, Florida

The following is a list of LTV A-7 Corsair II on static display or in museums

== Surviving aircraft ==
=== Greece ===
A-7H

- 158825 – Hellenic Air Force Museum Tatoi
- 159664 – Hellenic Air Force Museum Tatoi
- 160616 – Hellenic Air Force Museum Tatoi

=== Poland ===
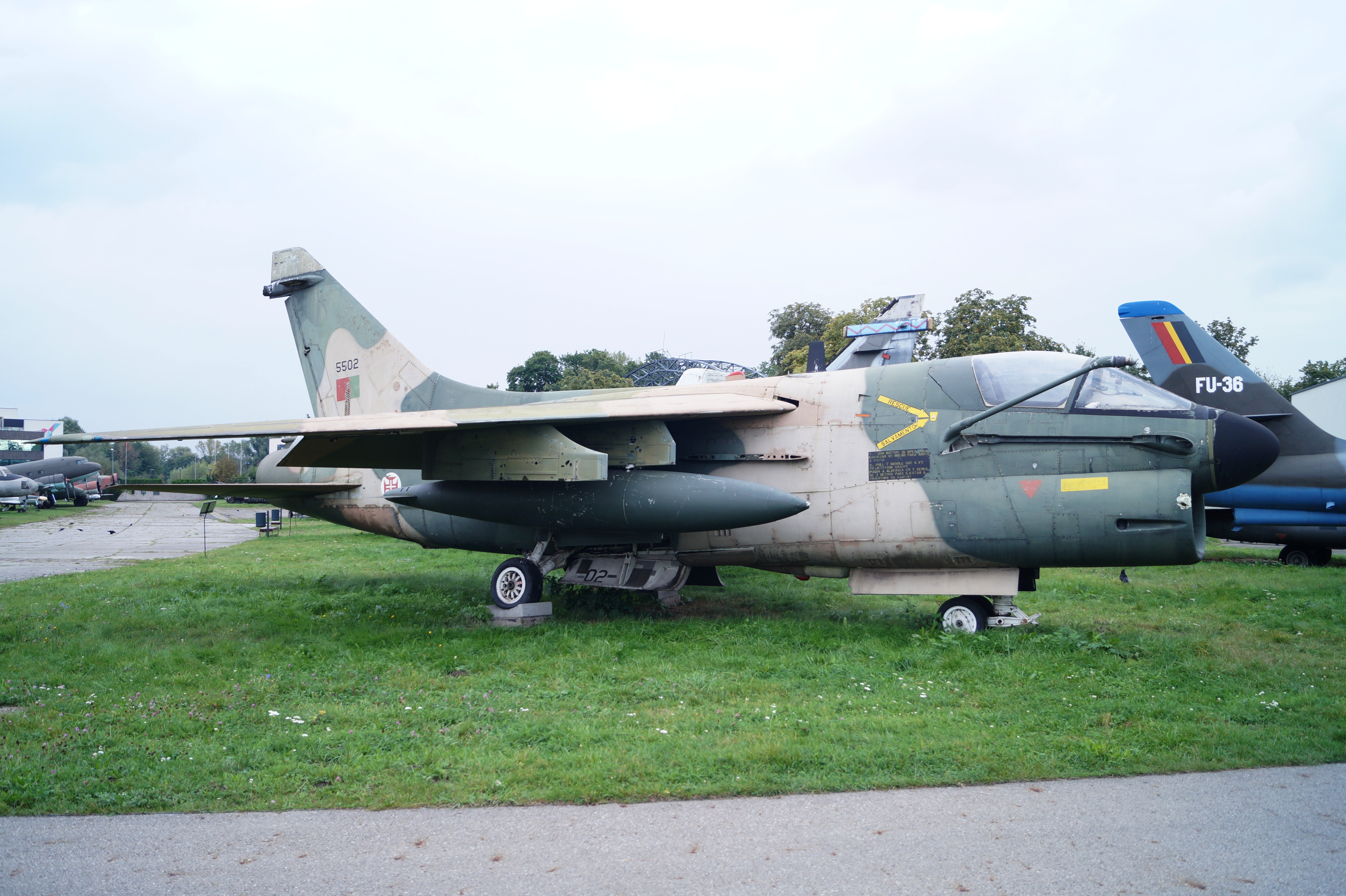
A Retired Ex Portuguese Air Force in Polish Aviation Museum

A-7P

- 5502 – Ex Portuguese Air Force, Polish Aviation Museum, Kraków.

=== Thailand ===
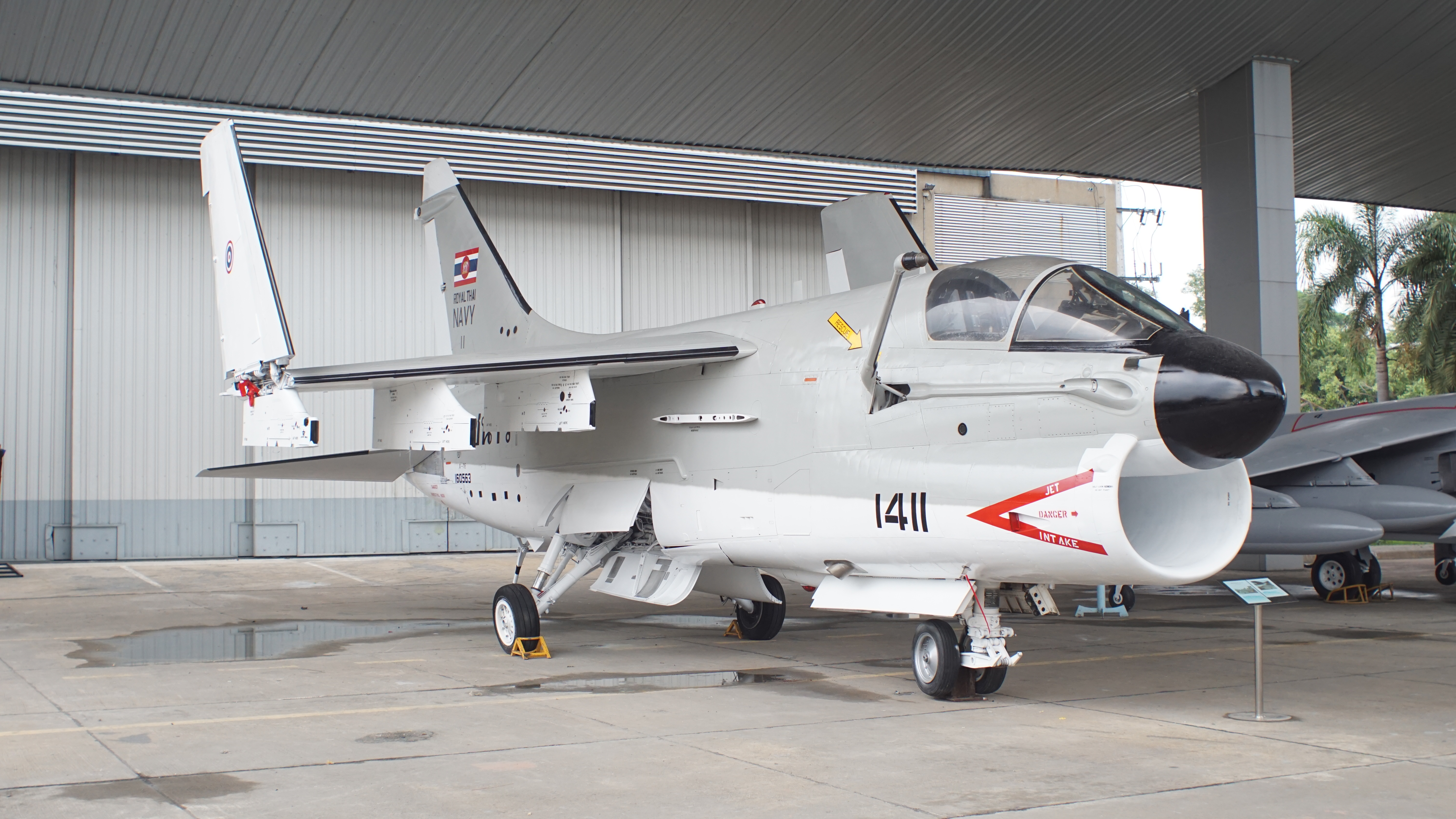
A Retired Royal Thai Navy in the Royal Thai Air Force Museum

A-7E

- 160563 – Retired Royal Thai Navy in the Royal Thai Air Force Museum.

=== United States ===
A-7A

- 152647 – High Springs Community School, High Springs, Florida.
- 152650 – Don Garlits Museum of Drag Racing, Ocala, Florida
- 152658 – Patuxent River Naval Air Museum, Patuxent River, Maryland
- 152660 (displayed as 69-6234) – Flying Tiger Heritage Park, England AFB (formerly), Alexandria, Louisiana.
- 152668 – Museum of Science and Industry, Chicago, Illinois returned to the USN in 2024.
- 152681 – Prairie Aviation Museum, Bloomington, Illinois
- 153135 – Valiant Air Command Warbird Museum, Titusville, Florida
- 153142 – Alliance High School, Alliance, Ohio.
- 153150 – Cecil Field POW/MIA Memorial, formerly Pocahontas Municipal Airport (moved August 2019), Pocahontas, Arkansas.
- 153163 – Fabricor Inc., Cleves, Ohio.
- 153220 – American Legion Post 1170, Round Lake, Illinois.
- 153241 – Pacific Coast Air Museum, Santa Rosa, California
- 153242 – U.S. Space and Rocket Center, Huntsville, Alabama.
- 153266 – Veterans of Foreign Wars (VFW) Post 8343 & 11038, Rochester, Wisconsin.
- 154345 – Hickory Aviation Museum, Hickory, North Carolina

A-7B

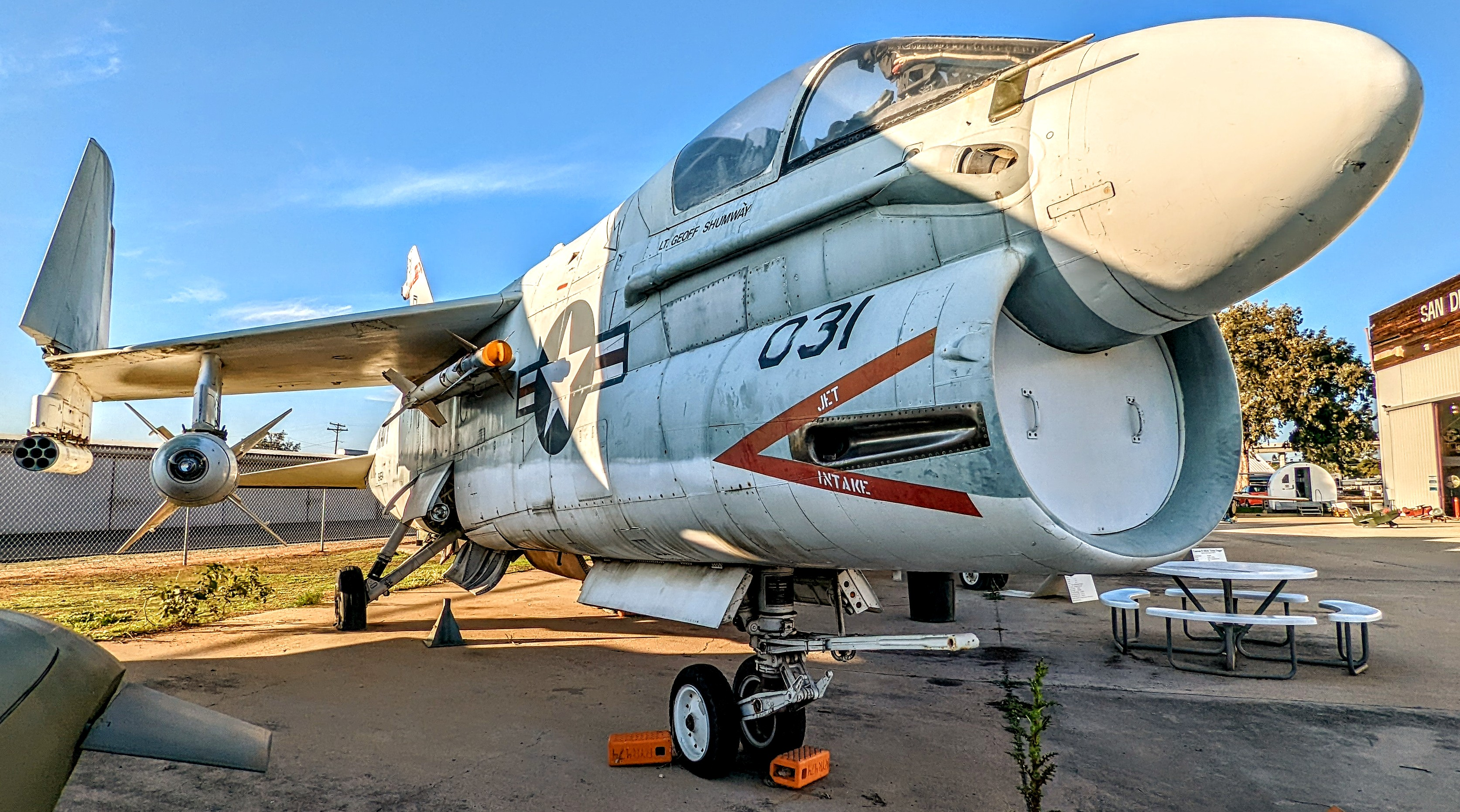
A-7B 154554 Corsair at SDASM Annex

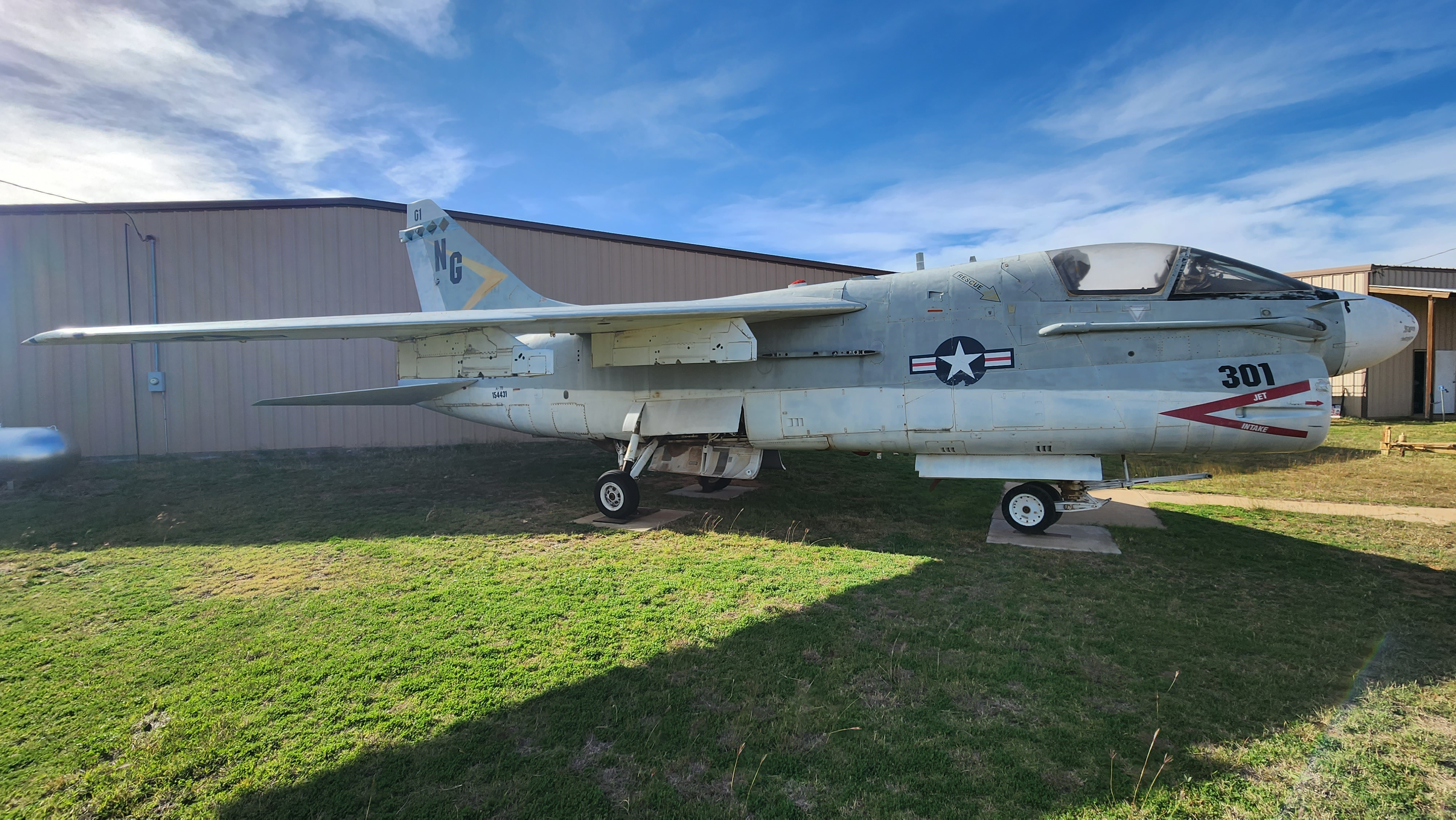
A-7B at the Texas Air Museum in Slaton, Texas.

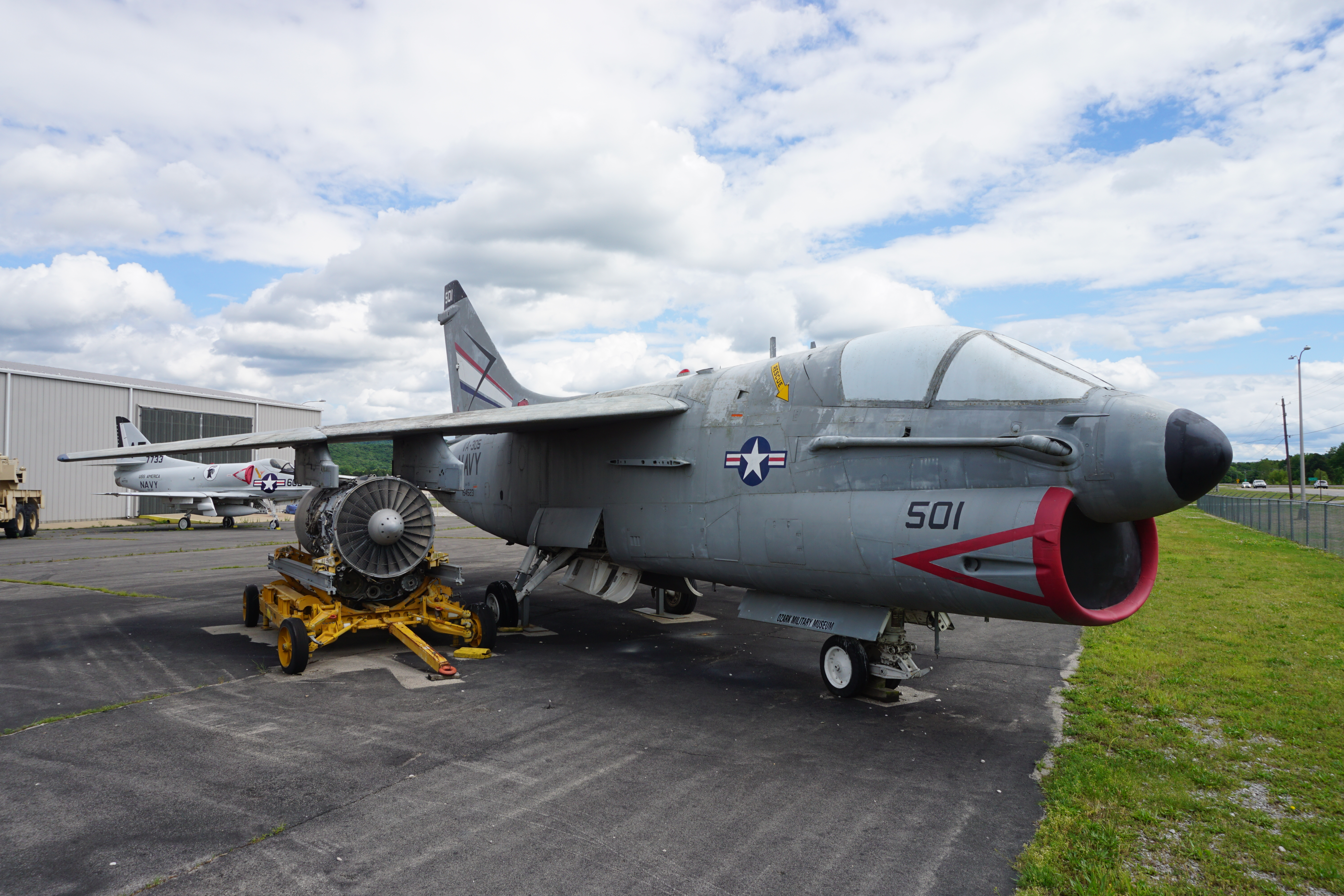
LTV A-7B Corsair II at the Arkansas Air & Military Museum in Fayetteville, Arkansas

- 154362 – NAS Alameda (formerly), Alameda, California.
- 154370 – USS Midway Museum, San Diego, California
- 154420 – NAS Fallon, Nevada.
- 154431 – Texas Air Museum - Caprock Chapter, Slaton Municipal Airport, Slaton, Texas
- 154443 – NAS Lakehurst, Lakehurst, New Jersey.
- 154449 – Joe Davies Heritage Airpark at Palmdale Plant 42, Palmdale, California
- 154474 – NASA Stennis Space Center, Bay Saint Louis, Mississippi.
- 154475 – Yanks Air Museum, Chino, California
- 154476 – El Centro NAF, El Centro, California.
- 154479 – Fort Worth Aviation Museum, Fort Worth, Texas
- 154485 – American Military Heritage Foundation Museum, Saint John the Baptist Peri Airport, Reserve, Louisiana.
- 154502 – Frontiers of Flight Museum, Dallas, Texas
- 154505 – Celebrity Row, Davis-Monthan AFB (North Side), Tucson, Arizona.
- 154523 – Arkansas Air & Military Museum, Fayetteville, Arkansas.
- 154538 – Yanks Air Museum, Chino, California
- 154548 – USS Lexington Museum, Corpus Christi, Texas
- 154550 – Air Victory Museum, Medford, New Jersey
- 154554 – San Diego Air and Space Museum, Gillespie Field Annex, San Diego, California.

A-7C

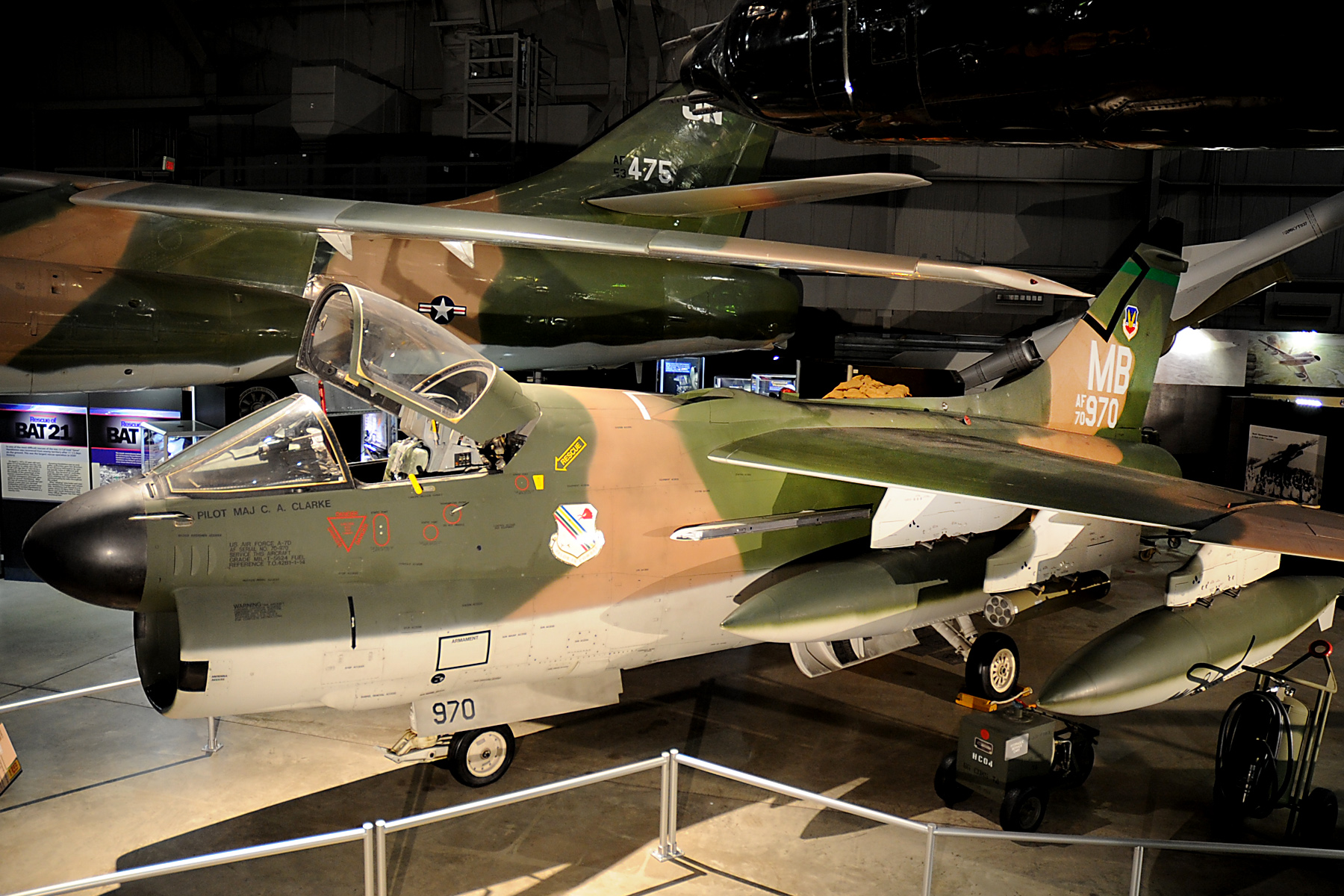
TV A-7D Corsair II in the Southeast Asia War Gallery at the National Museum of the U.S. Air Force

- 156734 – NAS Fallon, Fallon, Nevada.
- 156739 – Estrella Warbirds Museum, Paso Robles, California
- 156763 (displayed as 160122) – NAS Lemoore, California.
- 156797 – United States Naval Museum of Armament and Technology, Ridgecrest, California.

TA-7C

A TA-7C trainer on display at the National Museum of Nuclear Science and History

- 154407 – National Museum of Nuclear Science and History, Albuquerque, New Mexico
- 156751 – Russell Military Museum, Russell, Illinois
- 156782 – New Century Air Center, Olathe, Kansas.

YA-7D

- 67-14583 – Air Force Flight Test Center Museum, Edwards AFB, California

A-7D

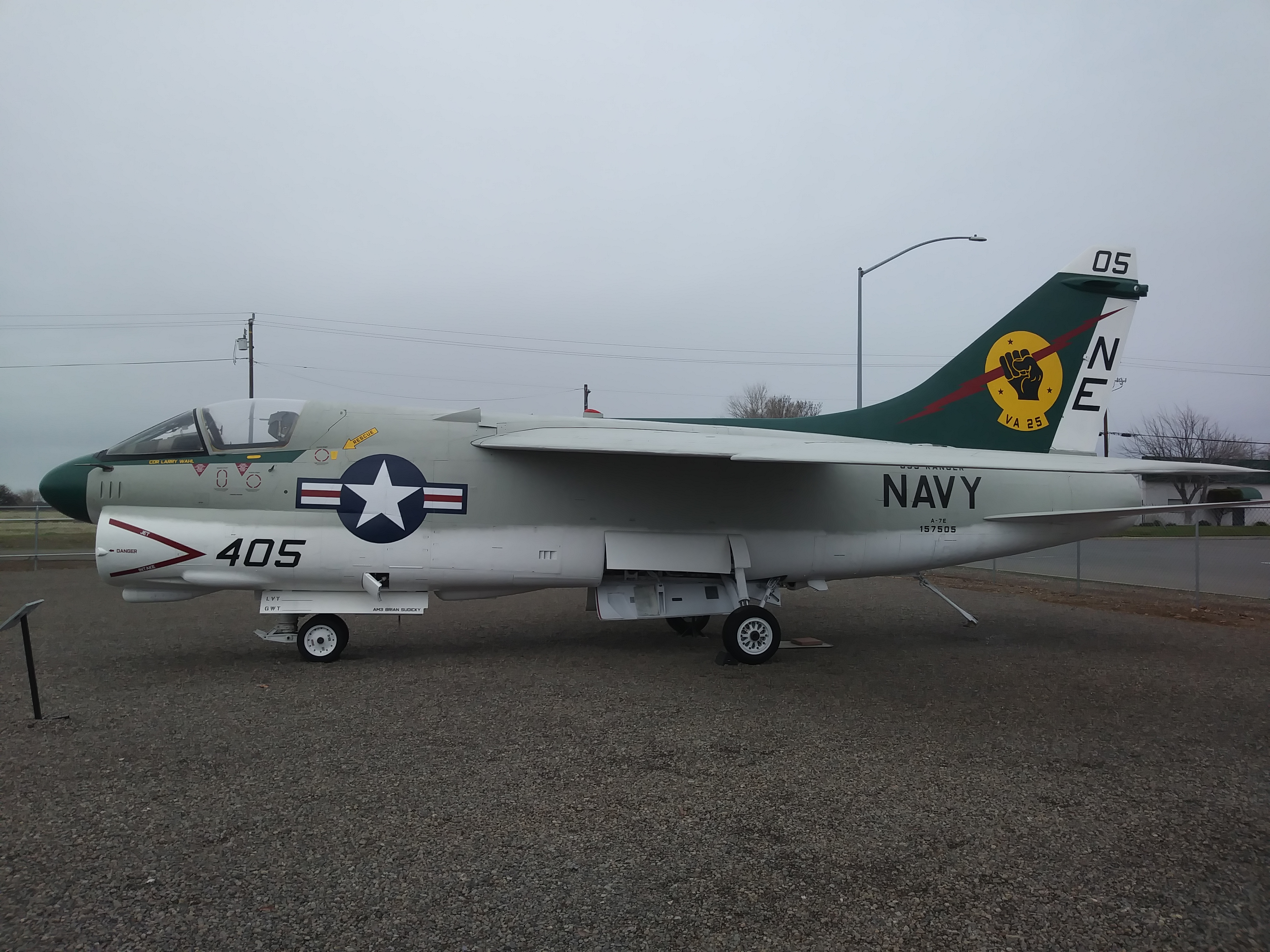
A-7D painted as an A-7E at the Chico Air Museum

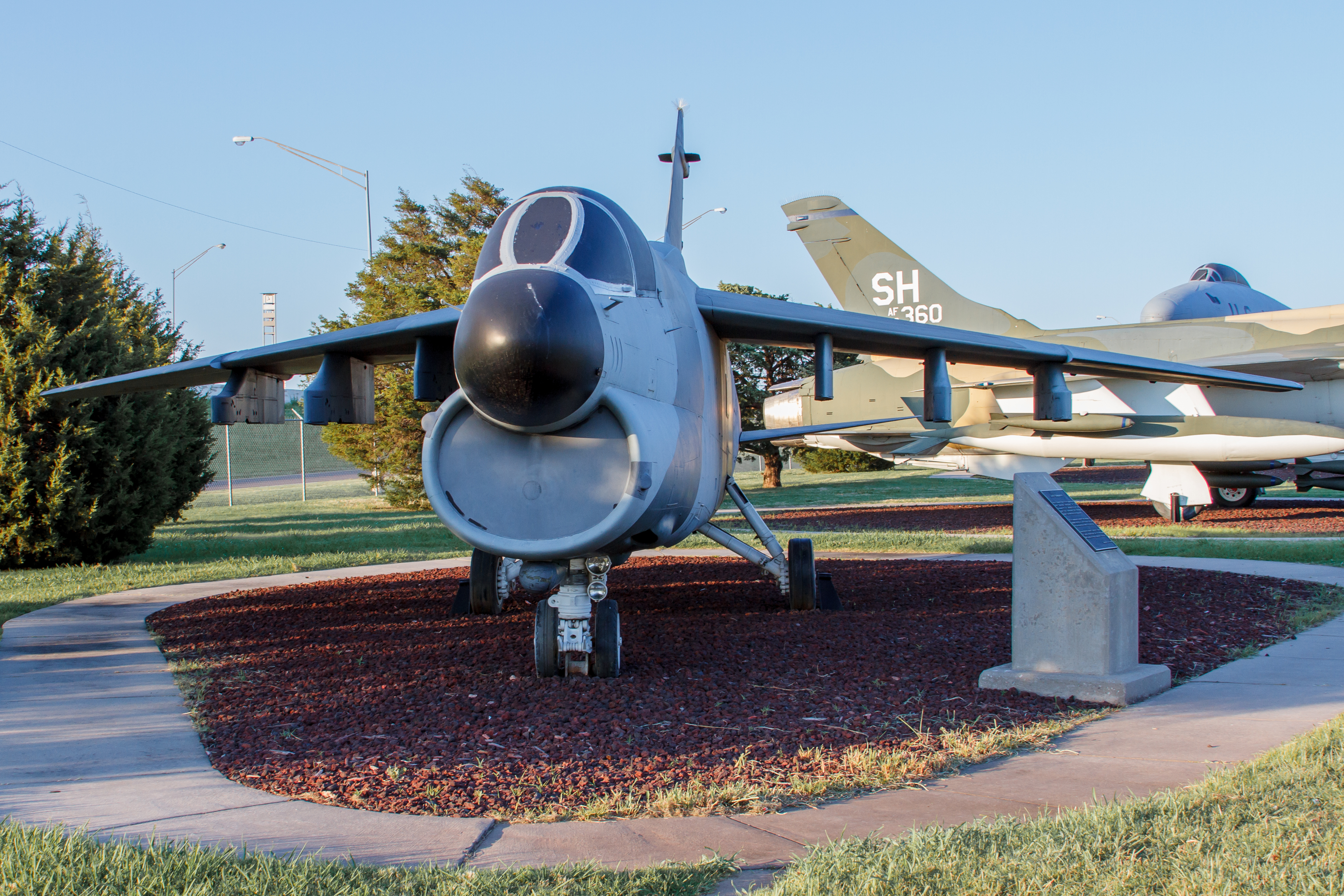
A A-7D Corsair on display at Tinker AFB, Oklahoma.

- 68-8220 – Tomah Veterans Hospital, Wisconsin.
- 68-8222 – Dakota Territory Air Museum, Minot International Airport, Minot, North Dakota
- 68-8223 – Veterans of Foreign Wars (VFW) Post 728, Danville, Illinois.
- 68-8226 – American Veterans (AMVETS) Post 7, North Vernon, Indiana.
- 68-8229 – Warrior Park, Davis-Monthan AFB (North Side), Tucson, Arizona.
- 68-8230 – Cullom, Illinois.
- 69-6188 – March Field Air Museum, Riverside, California
- 69-6191 – Freedom Park Naval Museum, Omaha, Nebraska.
- 69-6192 – Alexander Airport Park, Wausau, Wisconsin.
- 69-6193 – Colorado State Veterans Center, Homelake, Colorado.
- 69-6197 – Glenn L. Martin Aviation Museum, Middle River, Maryland
- 69-6200 – Wings of Eagles Discovery Center, Horseheads, New York
- 69-6202 – Luis Muñoz Marín International Airport, San Juan, Puerto Rico.
- 69-6208 – Veterans of Foreign Wars (VFW) Post 4324, Harry Stern Airport, Wahpeton, North Dakota.
- 69-6239 – Faulkton Municipal Airport, Faulkton, South Dakota.
- 69-6241 – Brooke County Veterans Memorial Park, Weirton, West Virginia.
- 69-6242 – Greeley Weld County Airport, Greeley, Colorado.
- 70-0931 – South Dakota ANGB - 114th FW, Sioux Falls, South Dakota.
- 70-0937 – Correctionville, Iowa.
- 70-0963 – American Legion Post 307, Martin Field, South Sioux City, Nebraska.
- 70-0964 – Chico Air Museum, Chico, California. Painted as an A-7E (Buno 157505) from VA-25. This aircraft donated from the collection of George Ford and was purchased at Auction from the Merle Maine Estate Ontario Oregon.
- 70-0966 – Virginia Aviation Museum, Richmond International Airport, Richmond, Virginia
- 70-0970 – National Museum of the United States Air Force, Wright-Patterson AFB, Dayton, Ohio
- 70-0973 – Pima Air & Space Museum, Tucson, Arizona
- 70-0982 – Wisconsin National Guard Memorial Library and Museum, Volk Field, Camp Douglas, Wisconsin.
- 70-0996 – South Dakota National Guard Museum, Pierre, South Dakota.
- 70-0998 – Aerospace Museum of California, McClellan AFB, McClellan, California
- 70-1001 – Buckley Space Force Base (North-West Side), Denver, Colorado.
- 70-1008 – Monoma County Veterans Memorial & Museum, Onawa, Iowa.
- 70-1012 – Huron Regional Airport, Huron, South Dakota.
- 70-1019 – Myrtle Beach AFB, South Carolina.
- 70-1028 – Oklahoma ANGB - 138th FG, Tulsa, Oklahoma.
- 70-1035 – Memorial Park, McEntire ANGB, Columbia, South Carolina.
- 70-1040 – Firefighting Training Center, Helena, Montana.
- 70-1046 – Wyoming ANGB - 153th AG, Cheyenne, Wyoming.
- 70-1050 – Marv Skie–Lincoln County Airport, Tea, South Dakota.
- 70-1055 – Montrose County Airport, Montrose, Colorado.
- 71-0297 - Tulsa Technology Center, Tulsa, Oklahoma
- 71-0334 – Sam Wise Youth Complex, Altoona, Iowa.
- 71-0337 – 37th Training Wing HQ Parade Ground, Kelly Field (formerly Kelly AFB), San Antonio, Texas.
- 71-0342 – Miracle of America Museum, Polson, Montana
- 71-0347 – American Legion Post 50, Blue Island, Illinois.
- 71-0360 – Ohio ANG, Blue Ash Air Station, Blue Ash, Ohio.
- 72-0117 – Kirtland AFB, Albuquerque, New Mexico.
- 72-0175 – Heritage Museum, Tinker AFB (north side), Oklahoma City, Oklahoma.
- 72-0178 – Ohio ANG, Springfield, Ohio.
- 72-0188 – Commemorative Air Force - Highland Lakes Squadron, Burnet, Texas
- 72-0211 – Ohio ANG, Toledo Express Airport, Toledo, Ohio.
- 72-0213 – Iowa Aviation Museum, Greenfield, Iowa
- 72-0230 – Moody Heritage Park, Moody AFB, Valdosta, Georgia.
- 72-0245 – New Mexico ANG, Santa Rosa Route 66 Airport, Santa Rosa, New Mexico.
- 72-0247 – Naval Air Reserve Facility, Rickenbacker Airport, Columbus, Ohio.
- 72-0254 – Arthur N Neu Airport, Carroll, Iowa.
- 72-0261 – Selfridge Military Air Museum and Air Park, Selfridge AFB, Michigan
- 73-0996 – Wings Over the Rockies Air and Space Museum, Denver, Colorado
- 73-0999 – Rickenbacker ANGB, Ohio ANG - 121st ARW, Rickenbacker Airport, Columbus, Ohio.
- 73-1002 – Pennsylvania ANGB - 171st ARW, Pittsburgh, Pennsylvania.
- 73-1006 – MOTTS Military Museum, Columbus, Ohio.
- 73-1009 – Mid-America Air Museum, Liberal, Kansas.
- 73-1010 – Veterans Memorial Park, Alexander City, Alabama.
- 74-1739 – South Dakota Air and Space Museum, Ellsworth AFB, South Dakota.
- 74-1741 – Arizona Military Museum, Phoenix, Arizona.
- 74-1746 – National Guard Armory, Farmington, New Mexico.
- 74-1756 – 45th Infantry Museum, Oklahoma City, Oklahoma.
- 74-1760 – Airport, Salinas, Puerto Rico.
- 75-0394 – Arizona ANGB, Tucson, Arizona.
- 75-0400 – Grimes ANG - Iowa ANG - 132nd FW, Des Moines Airport, Iowa.
- 75-0403 – Iowa Gold Star Military Museum, Camp Dodge, Johnston, Iowa.
- 75-0406 – Iowa Air National Guard - 185th Fighter Wing, Sioux City, Iowa.
- 75-0408 – Quonset Air Museum, North Kingstown, Rhode Island
- New England Air Museum, Windsor Locks, Connecticut

GA-7D

- 69-6190 – Russell Military Museum, Zion, Illinois. Formerly on display at Octave Chanute Aerospace Museum, Rantoul, Illinois

A-7E

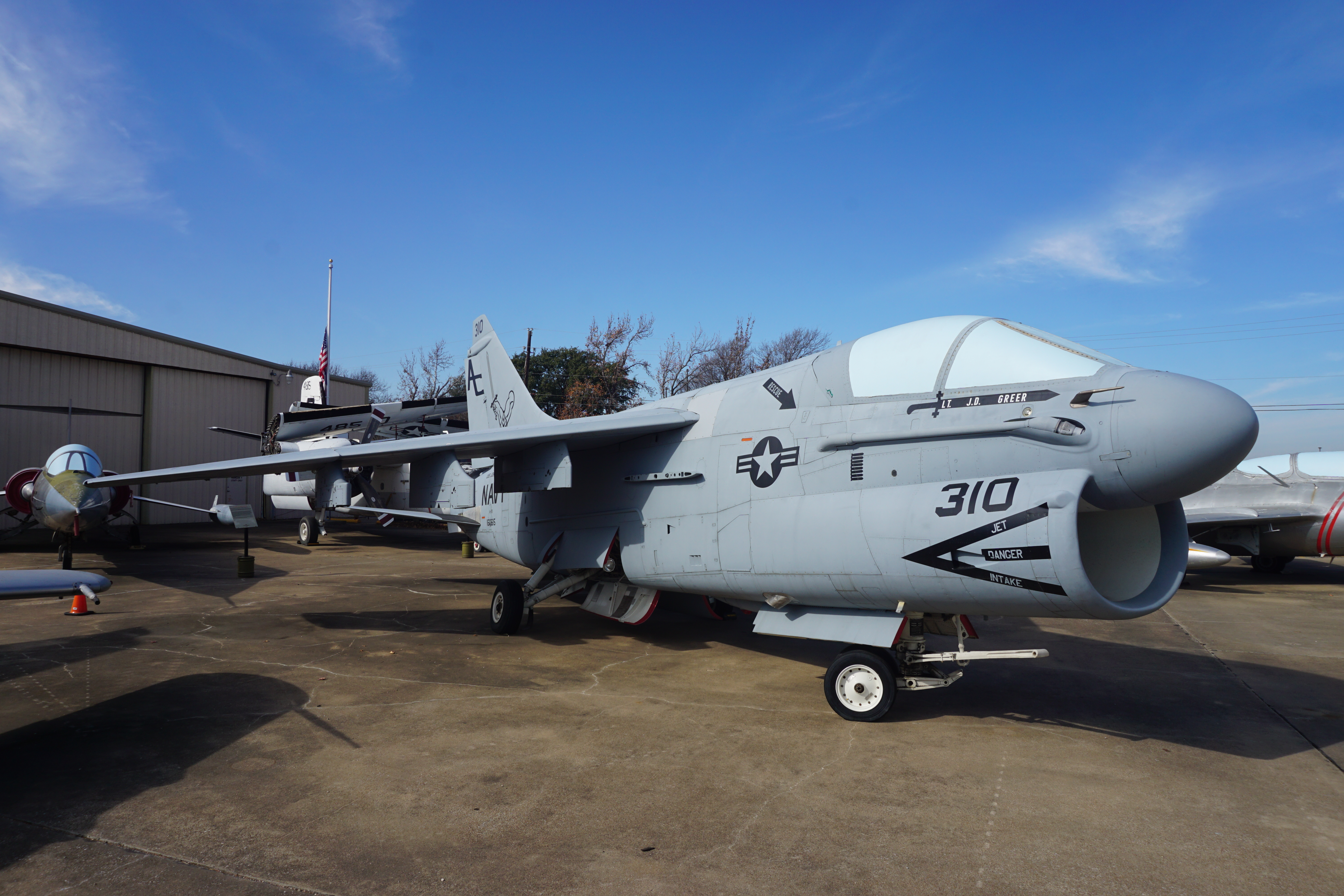
A-7E at the Cavanaugh Flight Museum

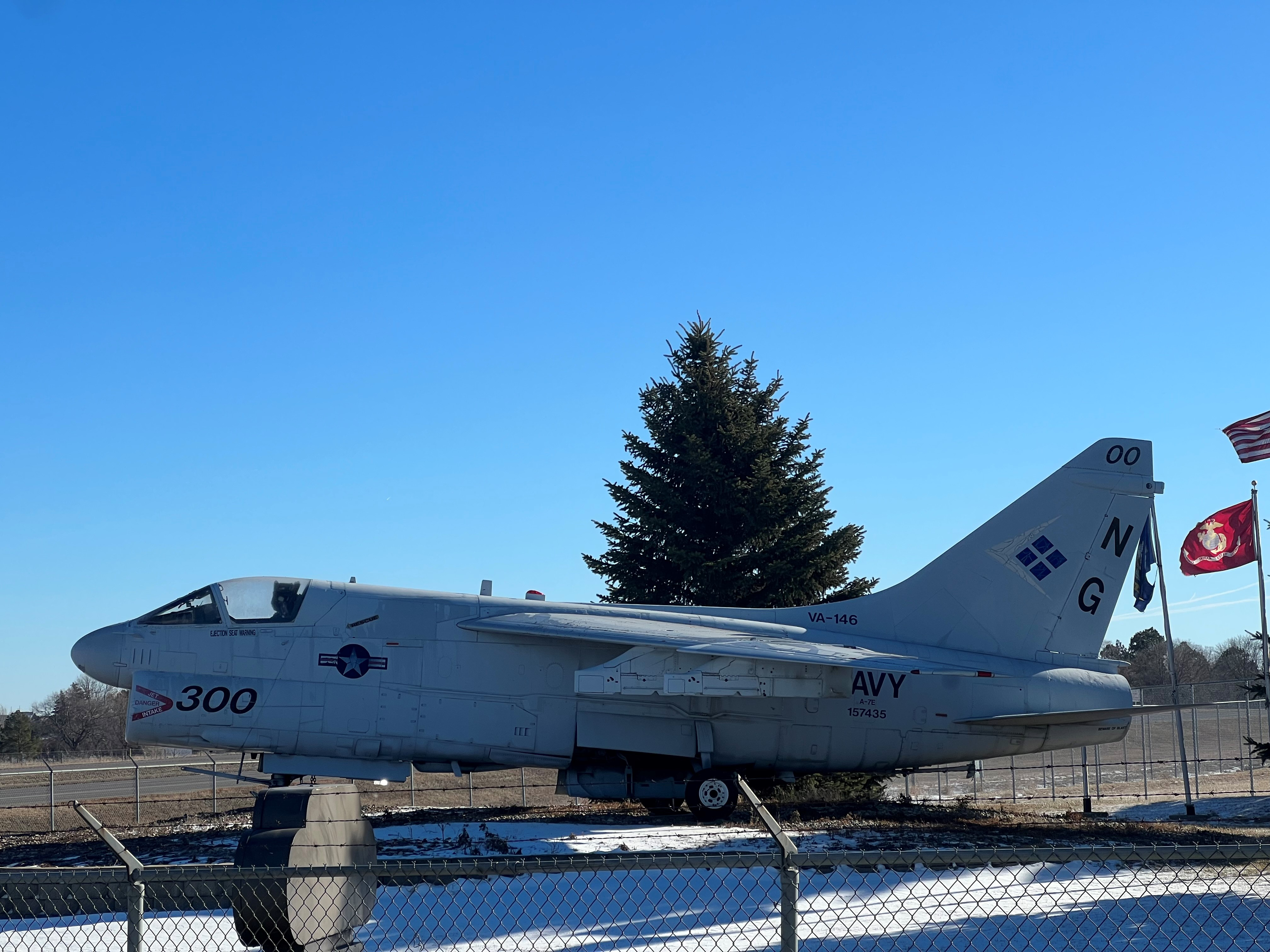
A-7E near the Watertown Regional Airport

- 156801 – under restoration to airworthiness by a private owner in Richardson, Texas
- 156804 – stored outside at the National Naval Aviation Museum, NAS Pensacola, Florida.
- 157435 – Watertown Regional Airport, Watertown, South Dakota.
- 157452 – Aviation History & Technology Center, Dobbins ARB (formerly Atlanta NAS), Atlanta, Georgia.
- 157455 – War Eagles Air Museum, Santa Teresa, New Mexico.
- 157506 – Air Power Park, Hampton, Virginia.
- 157586 (displayed as 157503) – Camp Blanding AAF/NG - Museum and Memorial Park, Camp Blanding, Jacksonville, Florida.
- 158003 – Brothers Welcome Airport, Lake City, Florida.
- 158026 – Heritage in Flight Museum, Lincoln, Illinois
- 158657 – New Century Air Center, Olathe, Kansas.
- 158662 – NAS Oceana (South Side), Virginia Beach, Virginia.
- 158319 – Tillamook Air Museum, Tillamook, Oregon
- 158842 – Air Classics Museum of Aviation, Sugar Grove, Illinois
- 159261 – Veterans Memorial Park, University Mall, Tuscaloosa, Alabama
- 159268 – MAPS Air Museum, Canton, Ohio
- 159278 – Southern Museum of Flight, Birmingham, Alabama.
- 159291 – Patriots Point Naval & Maritime Museum, Charleston, South Carolina
- 159301 – Oakland Aviation Museum, Oakland, California
- 159303 – Edwardsville Township Park, Edwardsville, Illinois
- 159647 – Fallon Auto Mall, Fallon, Nevada.
- 159971 – Carolinas Aviation Museum, Charlotte, North Carolina
- 159974 – New Orleans NAS JRB, New Orleans, Louisiana.
- 160613 – Empire State Aerosciences Museum, Glenville, New York
- 160614 – Mountain Home High School, Mountain Home, Arkansas
- 160713 – Pima Air & Space Museum, Tucson, Arizona
- 160714 – National Naval Aviation Museum, NAS Pensacola, Florida
- 160715 – Heritage Park, NAS Jacksonville, Jacksonville, Florida.
- 160724 – Louisiana Veterans Memorial, Baton Rouge, Louisiana
- 160869 – Veterans Museum, Halls, Tennessee

YA-7F

- 70-1039 – Hill Aerospace Museum, Hill AFB, Utah
- 71-0344 – Air Force Flight Test Center Museum, Edwards AFB, California

A-7K

- 80-0288 – Celebrity Row, Davis-Monthan AFB (North Side), Tucson, Arizona.
- 81-0073 – Iowa Gold Star Military Museum, Camp Dodge, Johnston, Iowa
