= 728th Battle Management Control Squadron =

728th Battle Management Control Squadron

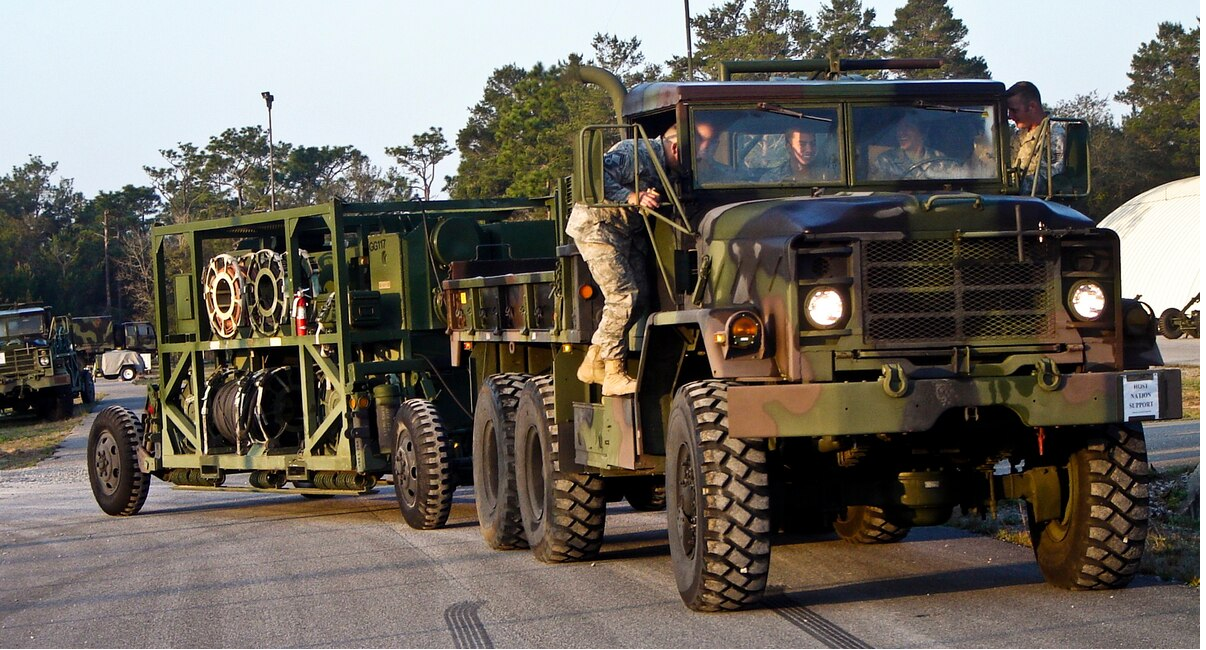
- A truck with equipment for a 728th Squadron exercise departs for Duke Field
- Active: 1950–2013; 2023–present
- Country: United States
- Branch: United States Air Force
- Role: Command and control
- Part of: Air Combat Command
- Garrison/HQ: Robins Air Force Base, Georgia
- Motto: Poised for Peace
- Mascot: Demon
- Engagements: Operation Desert Storm
- Decorations: Air Force Outstanding Unit Award

Commanders
- Current commander: Lt Col Alex "Big Bobby" Wallis

Insignia
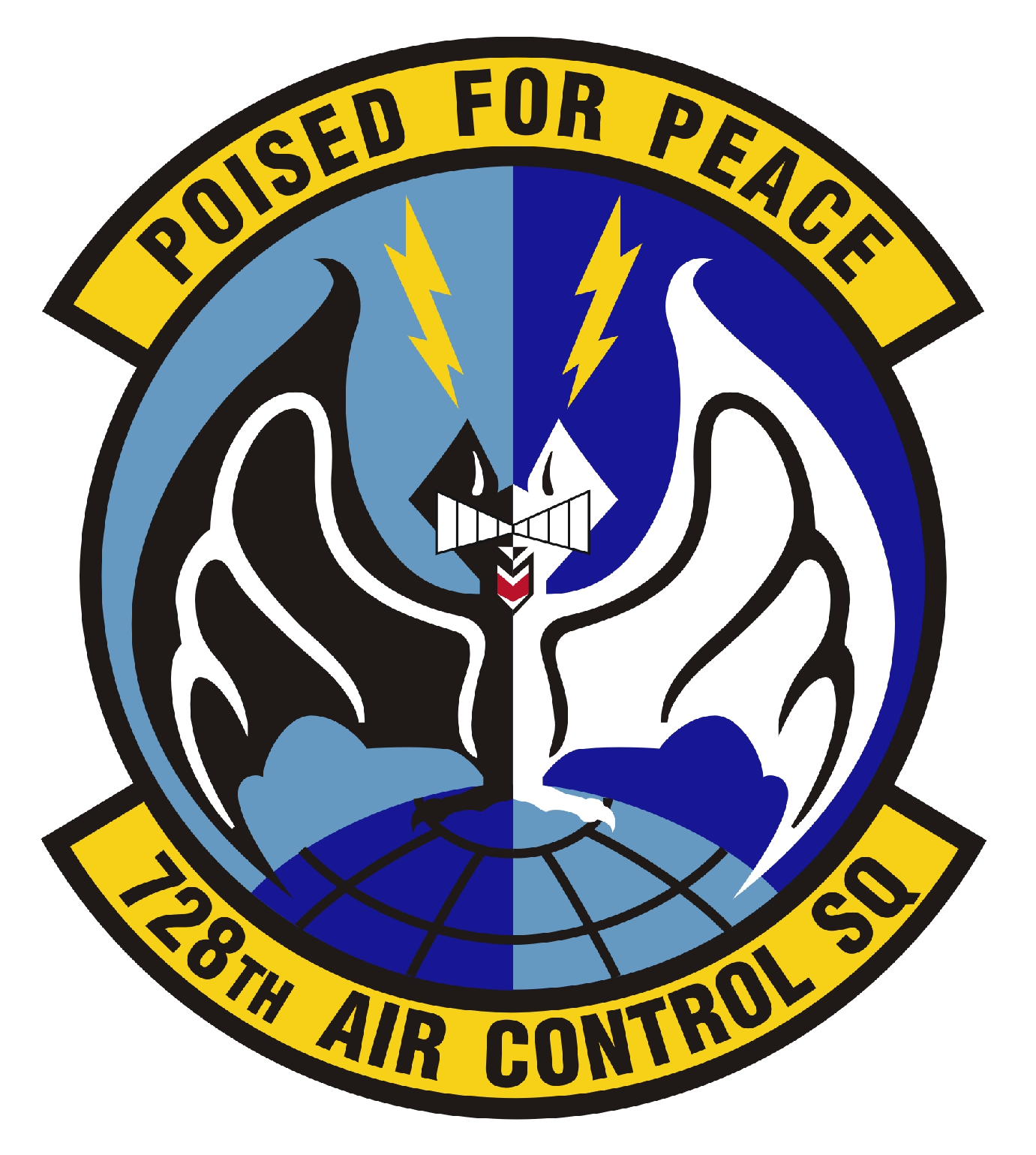
- 728th Battle Management Control Squadron emblem (Note: Approved 7 April 2009. Description: On a disc parted per pale celeste and azure, issuing from base a demi-globe parted per pale of the field counterchanged, gridlined sable, supporting a stylized bat parted per pale of the third [color mentioned] and argent counterchanged, his eyes as a radar of the fourth [color mentioned] detailed of the third [color mentioned], langued gules, in chief two lightning bolts or; all within a narrow black border. Attached above the disc, a yellow scroll edged with a narrow black border and inscribed "POISED FOR PEACE" in black letters. Attached below the disc, a yellow scroll edged with a narrow black border and inscribed "728TH AIR CONTROL SQ" in black letters. Significance: Ultramarine blue and Air Force yellow are the Air Force colors. Blue alludes to the sky, the primary theater of Air Force operations. Yellow refers to the sun and the excellence required of Air Force personnel. The two colors of the field represent day and night operations. The counterchanged globe symbolizes fair and foul weather. The counterchanged stylized bat signifies battle management functions of theater air defense during night and day, data link management, surveillance, identification and air battle execution. The bat's radar eyes represent the means to search the sky to accomplish tactical unit functions. The lightning bolts symbolize the high speed exchange of combat communications and fused data crucial to joint tactical operations.)

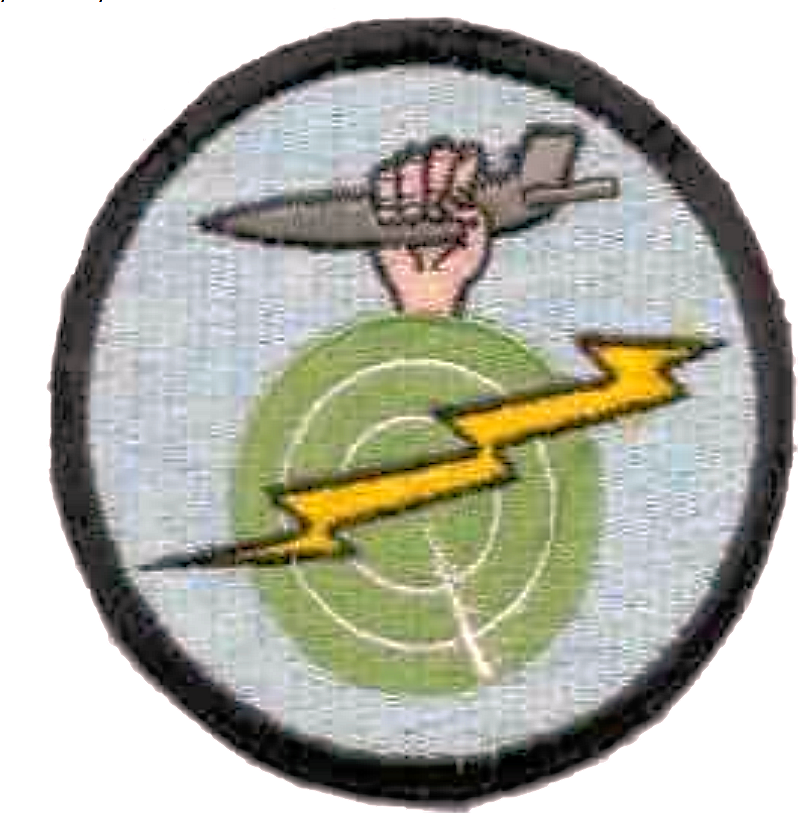
- 728th Aircraft Control and Warning Squadron emblem (Note: Approved 16 July 1954.)

The 728th Battle Management Control Squadron (formerly Air Control Squadron) is an active United States Air Force unit that since February 2023 provides command and control of aircraft in United States Central Command by performing 24/7 real-time radar surveillance along with airspace deconfliction, air-refueling positioning, and tactical reconnaissance.

It was previously assigned to the 552d Air Control Group, 552d Air Control Wing and was inactivated on 17 May 2013. On 13 February 2023 the unit was activated at Robins Air Force Base, Georgia as the new primary mission of the 461st Air Control Wing and was redesignated as 728th Battle Management Control Squadron.

From 1950 to 2013, the unit was a Control and Reporting Center.

== History ==
The squadron was activated on 2 September 1950 at Turner Air Force Base, Georgia. The unit, originally designated 728th Aircraft Control and Warning Squadron moved to Pope Air Force Base, North Carolina on 2 November 1950 followed by a move to Donaldson Air Force Base, South Carolina on 16 January 1954. On 12 June 1956, the squadron was stationed at Shaw Air Force Base, South Carolina. In the early 1960s, as Army airborne units were training for deployment to Vietnam, Detachment 1 of the 728th Squadron operated out of a field deployment on Fort Bragg and set up mobile communications systems for Army field exercises. This detachment moved to McCoy Air Force Base, Florida in 1965 and provided radio relay communications for the Inter-American Peace Force at San Isidro Air Base in the Dominican Republic. The detachment relocated to Myrtle Beach Air Force Base, South Carolina in 1967. The 728th, in those days, was an element of Tactical Air Command and supported the Composite Air Strike Force. The Detachment at Myrtle Beachwas discontinued in 1969 and its personnel were sent to tactical control squadrons at Cannon Air Force Base, New Mexico; Eglin Air Force Base, Florida; Bergstrom Air Force Base, Texas and other bases. The 728th moved to Eglin Air Force Base Auxiliary Field No. 3 (Duke Field) on 15 August 1977.

=== Awards and activities ===
Since the squadron's creation, the 728th has received six Air Force Outstanding Unit Awards and has participated in several major command, U.S. Readiness Command and Joint Chiefs of Staff directed exercises and deployments throughout the world. During Operations Desert Shield/Storm, the 728th fulfilled a vital role in the coalition effort while they were deployed to King Kalid Military City, Saudi Arabia. The 728th also participated in Operation Deny Flight, the suppression of flight activities over Bosnia, while deployed to Monte Jacotenente, Italy. Additionally, the 728th contributed to the fight against illegal narcotics in Central and South America and supported an ongoing rotation to Kuwait as part of Operation Desert Calm. They also have been deployed six times to Iraq to support Operation Iraqi Freedom.

With the transition of the 33d Fighter Wing from an Air Combat Command (ACC) unit operating the McDonnell F-15 Eagle to an Air Education and Training Command unit operating the Lockheed Martin F-35 Lightning II, as well as a push to consolidate all stateside control and reporting centers under one Wing, on 1 May 2008 the 728th Air Control Squadron was reassigned to the newly activated 552d Air Control Group at Tinker Air Force Base, Oklahoma. The 552d Air Control Group's parent wing is the 552d Air Control Wing also at Tinker Air Force Base which also operates the majority of the USAF's fleet of E-3B/C Sentry AWACS aircraft. The resulting wing consolidated all ACC tactical command and control and air Battle Management capabilities under one parent organization allowing for continuity among CRCs. The unit was inactivated in 2013. On 13 February 2023 the unit was redesignated as the 728th Battle Management Control Squadron and activated at Robins Air Force Base, Georgia. It was assigned to the 461 Operations Group of the 461st Air Control Wing.

== Lineage ==
- Constituted as the 728th Aircraft Control and Warning Squadron on 30 August 1950

Activated on 2 September 1950
Redesignated 728th Tactical Control Squadron on 1 July 1964
Redesignated 728th Air Control Squadron on 1 November 1991
Inactivated on 17 May 2013

- Redesignated 728th Battle Management Control Squadron on 12 December 2022

Activated on 13 February 2023

=== Assignments ===
- 507th Tactical Control Group (later 507th Communications and Control Group, 507th Tactical Control Group, 507th Tactical Air Control Group, 507th Tactical Air Control Wing, 507 Air Control Wing), 2 September 1950
- 33d Operations Group, 1 May 1992
- 552d Air Control Group, 1 May 2008 – 17 May 2013
- 461st Operations Group, 13 Feb 2023 – present

=== Stations ===
- Turner Air Force Base, Georgia, 2 September 1950
- Pope Air Force Base, North Carolina, 2 November 1950
- Donaldson Air Force Base, South Carolina, 16 January 1954
- Shaw Air Force Base, South Carolina, 12 June 1956
- Eglin Air Force Base Auxiliary Field No. 3 (Duke Field), Florida, 15 August 1977 – 17 May 2013 (Note: The unit's official list of stations does not reflect its move from the auxiliary field to the main base at Eglin on 5 June 1994.)
- Robins Air Force Base, Georgia, 13 February 2023 – present

=== Past Commanders ===
Capt. David F. Pyle	2 September 1950
Maj. Carl H. Leo	18 December 1950
Maj. Joseph R McNamara	ca. 1952
Maj. Frank S Puente	Jul 1953
Maj. J. M. Patrick	1 July 1954
Maj. George C. Marvin	25 July 1955
Maj. Blythe E. Stevens	15 August 1955
Capt J. N. Landon	ca. 1955
Maj. Edmond Jacobs	7 November 1955
Lt Col. Homer L. Marcy	25 May 1956
Maj. Harry Leas	8 February 1957
Lt Col. Harry E Novinger	ca. 1957
Lt Col. Marshall F. Crispen	16 December 1959
Maj. Glen W. Richardson	24 June 1960
Maj. Frank Hathaway	ca. 1961
Lt Col. William F. Gilland	Unknown
Lt Col. Douglas P. Shinn	Unknown
Maj. Frank R. Highsmith	July 1963
Lt Col. Wilson M. Depriest	Aug 1964
Col Walter J. Russell Jr.,	ca. 1967
Lt Col Don F. Fair,	ca. 1968
Lt Col William N. Hopkins	15 April 1969
Lt Col Jimmy Hicks	9 February 1971
Lt Col Loren F. Driver	2 July 1971
Maj. Francis X. Arceneaux	ca. 1973
Lt Col Jack L. Breid	ca. 1974
Lt Col Arthur J. Gillett	ca. 4th Qtr 1975
Lt Col James L. Johnson	25 July 1977
Maj. James Koza	16 July 1979
Lt Col Gerald E. Haba	29 July 1981
Lt Col Bobby R. Wright	ca. Dec 1982
Lt Col Bobby W. Smart	ca. Dec 1983
Lt Col Terry M. McKenzie	1 June 1984
Lt Col Terry F. Green	13 June 1986
Lt Col Lloyd W. McGrady	7 November 1989
Lt Col William L. Alford	ca. Nov 1990
Lt Col Steven S. Savage	2 November 1992
Lt Col Mike Davis	ca. 1993
Lt Col Mark E. Bontrager	9 January 1995
Lt Col Dale R. Wildey	2 June 1997
Lt Col Jon C. Wilson	7 May 1999
Lt Col Randal S. Nelson	12 June 2001
Lt Col Scot D. Shively	27 August 2003
Lt Col Frederick S. DeFranza	1 September 2005
Lt Col Douglas I. Hagen	20 June 2007
Lt Col Dominic Setka	16 October 2009
Lt Col Jon Rhone	May 2011
Lt Col Joshua T. Gulbranson	13 February 2023
