= Blue Ash Air Station =

Blue Ash Air National Guard Station
- Part of Ohio Air National Guard (ANG)
- Blue Ash, Ohio

Site information
- Controlled by: United States Air Force

Location
- Location of Blue Ash Air National Guard Station in Ohio
- Coordinates: 39°15′26″N 84°23′16″W

Garrison information
- Garrison: 123rd Air Control Squadron

Blue Ash Air Station (also known as Blue Ash Air National Guard Station) is an Air National Guard facility located in Blue Ash, Ohio, United States, about 1/2 mile (0.80 km) north of the former Cincinnati–Blue Ash Airport. It has been the home of the Ohio Air National Guard's 123rd Air Control Squadron since November 1953. As of 2016, it was estimated to contribute $20 million annually to the local economy. An LTV A-7 Corsair II is on display at the station.
