= Cincinnati–Blue Ash Airport =

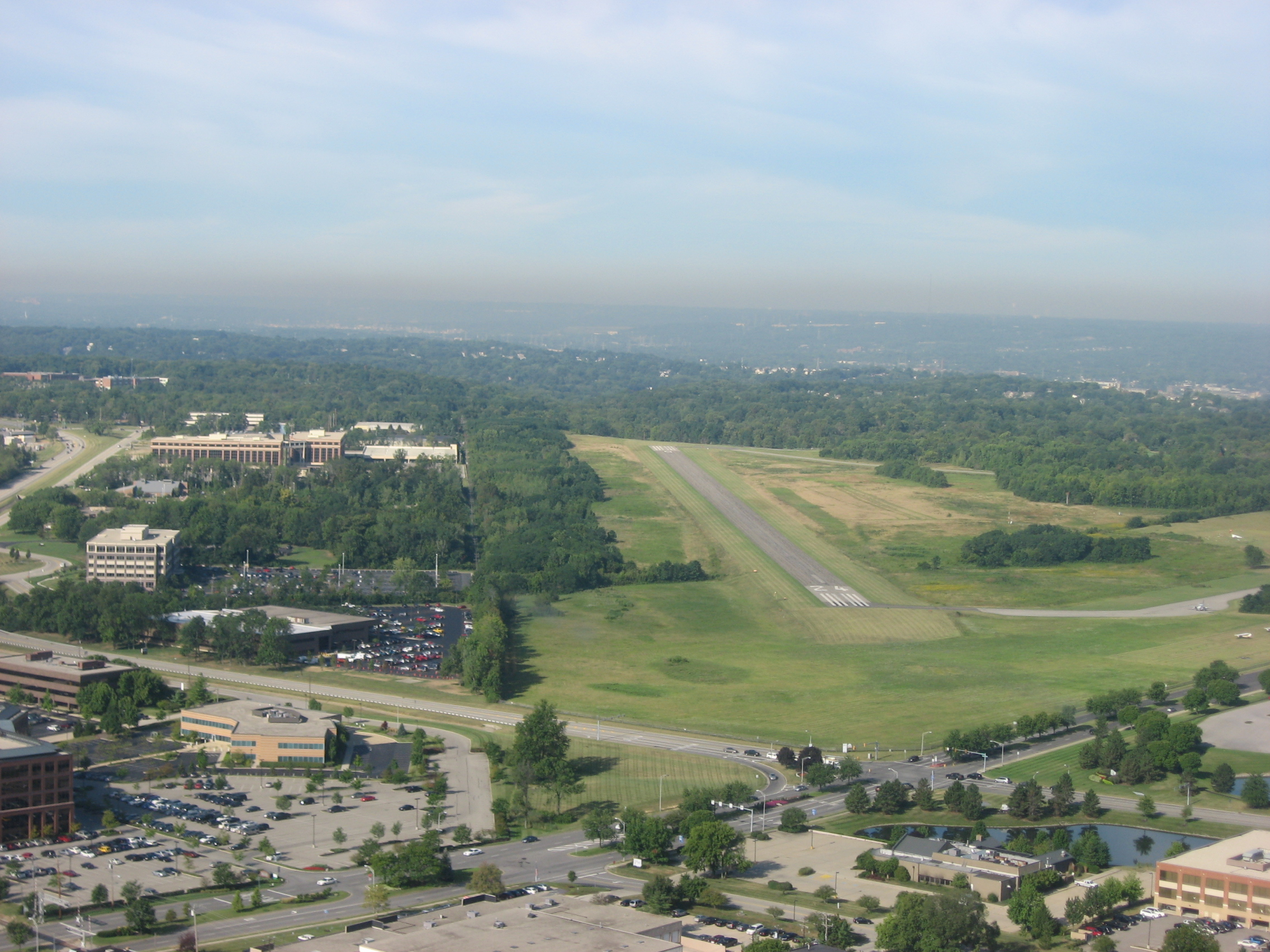
- Preparing to land on Runway 24
- IATA: none; ICAO: KISZ; FAA LID: ISZ

Summary
- Airport type: Public
- Owner: City of Cincinnati
- Serves: Cincinnati metropolitan area
- Location: Blue Ash, Ohio
- Opened: 1921
- Closed: August 29, 2012
- Passenger services ceased: 1990s
- Elevation AMSL: 856 ft (261 m)
- Coordinates: 39°14′48″N 084°23′20″W

Map
- Location of airport in Ohio ISZ (the United States)

Runways
Direction	Length		Surface
Direction	ft	m	Surface
6/24	~~3,499~~	~~1,066~~	~~Asphalt~~ (closed)

Statistics (2006)
- Aircraft operations: 35,000
- Based aircraft: 136
- Source: Federal Aviation Administration

Blue Ash Airport (ICAO: KISZ, FAA LID: ISZ), also known as Cincinnati–Blue Ash Airport, was a public airport located in Blue Ash, Ohio, United States and owned by the City of Cincinnati. Located 16.5 miles (26.6 km) northeast of downtown Cincinnati, it served as a general aviation reliever for the Cincinnati/Northern Kentucky International Airport.

Established in 1921, the airfield was one of the first in operation in the United States, and it became Ohio's first municipal airport when Cincinnati purchased it in 1946. For decades, it was eyed as a potential future site for Cincinnati's primary commercial airport, spurring construction of Cross County Highway, but efforts to develop the site repeatedly failed. In the 1970s, much of the property around the airfield was converted into an industrial park and golf course. Cincinnati eventually sold about half of the remaining airfield to the City of Blue Ash and permanently closed the facility on August 29, 2012, despite local efforts to keep it operational. In 2017, Cincinnati sold the remaining land and runway to Al Neyer, which is building a mixed-use development on the site.

Although most U.S. airports use the same three-letter location identifier for the FAA and IATA, Blue Ash Airport was assigned I77 and later ISZ by the FAA but had no designation from the IATA.

== History ==
=== Private ownership ===
Blue Ash Airport's history began in 1921 with a dirt runway located off Cooper Road, in then-unincorporated Sycamore Township, on land that has since been converted into an industrial park. The first Cincinnati–Chicago airmail flight took off from this field. On August 5, 1922, it was dedicated as Grisard Field, after Cincinnati-area pilot Lt. John K. Grisard, who was shot down in France during World War I. The following year, the Grisard Field Company leased the field to Maj. Hugh Watson, a barnstormer and former Army flight instructor, and his brother Parks. They were joined by John Paul Riddle and, in 1924, T. Higbee Embry. The company owned two Curtiss JN-4 biplanes. In its early days, the airfield's grass runways served general aviation, airmail operations, and the 359th Army Reserve Observation Squadron.

By 1938, there were two Watson airports. Hugh Watson Field operated out of this hangar on Glendale–Milford Road, while Parks Watson Airport operated out of the original Grisard barn-turned-hangar just to the south.

In 1925, the Grisard Company dissolved and moved its hangars and equipment to Lunken Field, then considered a more desirable location for its proximity to downtown Cincinnati. The reserve squadron moved there as well. Grisard Field was sold to the Watson brothers, who rededicated it as Watson Airport, with Eddie Rickenbacker in attendance. Hugh later moved to Lunken, leaving Parks in charge of the airport. After a year at Lunken, he returned to Blue Ash and built his own facility on the northern edge of the property, along Glendale Milford Road. By 1928, airlines were making scheduled flights to Cleveland and Louisville, Kentucky, from Watson.

=== Failed expansion plans ===
In 1938, after a major flood submerged Lunken Airport, Cincinnati city leaders began discussing a major expansion of the Blue Ash site in order to replace Lunken as the area's commercial airport. By this time, Watson was used primarily for training student pilots from local universities. The city purchased Parks Watson Airport in 1946 and Hugh Watson Field in 1955. The city headquartered Blue Ash Airport at the former Hugh Watson Field, keeping Parks Watson open for a time, and closed a shooting range that had operated on the property since the 1940s. The city's Blue Ash development plans were hampered by community opposition, three failed Hamilton County bond measures, political infighting, and Cincinnati's decision not to participate in the federal airfield program.

While fog and flooding continued to cause frequent problems at Lunken, Northern Kentucky officials secured federal funds to build a competing airport at Hebron, in 1944. The Greater Cincinnati Airport (CVG) began serving commercial flights there two years later. Cincinnati officials maintained expansion plans for the Blue Ash site into the 1960s, hoping to compete with CVG. County officials drew up plans for a 5-mile-long (8.0 km) connector from the Mill Creek Expressway (Interstate 75) to the airport. However, the Blue Ash Civic League and nearby residents continued to oppose the expansion plans. Blue Ash incorporated, first as a village in 1955, then as a city in 1961, to take control of zoning matters and contain the airfield. By 1959, the county dropped plans for an airport connector and instead focused on building a more ambitious Cross County Highway.

In 1960, the Internal Revenue Service selected the Cincinnati area for a new, five-state regional data center, prompting many area cities and townships to vie for the facility and its employees' income tax revenue. The following year, Blue Ash proposed to have Cincinnati donate part of the Blue Ash Airport site to the IRS, calling hopes for a major airport there "obsolete". For its part, Cincinnati had been pushing for a Queensgate location. Instead, Northern Kentucky officials again won out over their Ohio counterparts, securing a new facility in downtown Covington. The older southeastern half of the airport was closed in September 1963, with the newer northwestern half remaining in use.

=== Decline and closure ===
With the Blue Ash Airport destined to remain a quaint general aviation facility, the City of Cincinnati began to seek other uses for the undeveloped portions of the 1,600-acre (6.5 km^{2}) tract. The non-profit Community Improvement Corporation, initially led by Reed Hartman, carved out a well-landscaped CIC Industrial Park at the former Parks Watson Airport to the east and, in 1979, the 18-hole Blue Ash Golf Course to the west. In 1977, Cincinnati finally replaced the grass runways with a paved runway and taxiways, the city's last major infrastructure improvements to the airport. A decade later, the airport considered relocating to Goshen, where it would sit astride the Clermont-Warren county line.

In 2006, after years of negotiations, the City of Blue Ash purchased 128 acres (52 ha) of the airfield, including all the hangars and taxiways, from the City of Cincinnati for $37.5 million over 30 years. Because the Federal Aviation Administration had been subsidizing airport maintenance, Cincinnati was originally required to spend all proceeds towards aviation-related expenses, but the city had hoped to use $11 million for the construction of a revived streetcar system now known as the Cincinnati Bell Connector. COAST, an anti-streetcar interest group, opposed the use of airport funds for the streetcar. Residents of some Cincinnati neighborhoods were also upset that Mayor Mark Mallory had promised to disburse the same funds to neighborhood councils during his 2005 campaign against David Pepper. Nevertheless, the two cities reworked the purchase in 2007 to avoid violating FAA rules.

The most recent airport master plan called for the retention and improvement of the current runway but the removal and demolition of all facilities to the west of the runway (the current taxiways, hangars, and ramps), the construction of a parallel taxiway, and new terminals and facilities to the east of the runway. The reclaimed area to the west of the runway was to be converted into a park, some light retail spaces, a museum, and additional space for three relocated holes from the Blue Ash Golf Course.

Despite these plans, the City of Cincinnati concluded in 2012 that it could not afford to reconfigure the airstrip and keep it operational and decided to focus its resources on Lunken Airport. Meanwhile, Blue Ash expressed little interest in operating the airport itself, pointing out that the FAA had declined to finance the reconfiguration on several occasions and the runway was "at the end of its useful life". Amid declining airport revenues, the City of Cincinnati closed Blue Ash Airport permanently at noon on August 29, 2012 after 91 years of continuous service. Many planes were moved to more modern facilities at Lebanon-Warren County Airport, and Cincinnati West Airport also saw increased demand. That fall, Blue Ash opened phase I of Summit Park on the wooded western side of the airfield and demolished the Co-Op Aircraft Service hangar, which had stood since 1952.

On May 19, 2017, Cincinnati sold the remaining 98 acres (40 ha), including the runway, to Al. Neyer. Neyer is building a mixed-use development on the site named The Neighborhoods of Summit Park, beginning with a residential subdivision named The Daventry.

A 1969 Cessna aircraft was stranded at the airport when it closed; it was later stripped of its parts, then removed during construction.

== Facilities and aircraft ==
Before the sale of 128 acres (52 ha) to the City of Blue Ash, Cincinnati–Blue Ash Airport covered an area of 257 acres (104 ha) and was served by three fixed-base operators. Two taxiways and one asphalt-paved runway (6/24) measuring 3,499 by 75 feet (1,066 m × 23 m) roughly formed a right triangle. The runway, which was not sold to Blue Ash, was restricted to aircraft weighing less than 12,500 pounds (5,700 kg).

For the 12-month period ending January 30, 2006, the airport had 35,000 aircraft operations, an average of 95 per day: 97% general aviation, 2% air taxi and 1% military. There were 136 aircraft based at this airport: 88% single-engine and 11% multi-engine airplanes and 1% helicopter.

Under the Watsons, the airport was a scheduled stop for Universal Air Lines. Decades later, air charter service Schmidt Aviation flew scheduled flights between Blue Ash Airport and Chicago Midway International Airport.

== Activities ==
From 1997 to 2009, Blue Ash Airport hosted an annual air show known as Blue Ash Airport Days. This show was usually held in September and featured aerobatic performers, helicopter tours, and numerous static displays.

The airport was home to the fully restored World War II B-17 bomber, My Gal Sal (one of three B-17E bombers in existence). It was housed in the Warbirds hangar and open for touring at certain scheduled times. Plans were in place to make the bomber the centerpiece of an aviation museum at the airport. Despite having private funding already promised for the construction of the museum, the plans were abandoned when the airport was closed in 2012. The bomber was shrink-wrapped and sent to the National World War II Museum in New Orleans in August 2012.

== Accidents and incidents ==
- On 20 September 1929, a Great Lakes Sport Trainer crashed at Watson Airport, killing the pilot.
- On 31 October 1937, a glider crashed at Watson Airport due to structural failure, killing the pilot.
- On 3 July 1960, an unknown aircraft crashed immediately after takeoff from Parks Watson Airport, injuring the pilot and three passengers.
- On 8 July 1960, a Conrad 9800 crashed after taking off from the airport.
- On 8 August 1971, a Cessna 172 crashed into a field due to engine failure shortly after taking off from the airport, injuring the pilot and three passengers.
- On 3 September 1974, a Bellanca crashed after taking off from the airport, killing the pilot and two passengers.
- On 4 April 1991, a Mooney M20J crashed while attempting to land at the airport, killing the pilot.
- On 31 October 1993, a Mooney M20K crashed while attempting to land at the airport, killing the pilot.
- On 15 August 1998, a Cessna 152 departing from Blue Ash Airport bound for Cincinnati/Northern Kentucky International Airport ran out of fuel and collided with a car as it attempted a landing on Ronald Reagan Cross County Highway, killing three.
- On 11 May 2007, a Cessna 172 and a Beechcraft Bonanza collided in mid air minutes after both aircraft had taken off from the airport, killing all three on board.
- On 24 May 2008, a Cessna 172 crashed after hitting electrical wires while attempting an emergency landing at the airport.

== See also ==
The City of Cincinnati owns one other property outside its corporation limits:

- French Park (Amberley, Ohio)

Blue Ash Air Station is located 1/2 mile (0.80 km) to the north of the former Blue Ash Airport.
