= Worcester Air National Guard Station =

Worcester Air National Guard Station
- Part of Massachusetts Air National Guard
- Worcester, Massachusetts

Site information
- Type: Air National Guard Station
- Controlled by: United States Air Force

Location
- Location of Worcester Air National Guard Station, Massachusetts
- Coordinates: 42°16′48″N 071°46′43″W

Site history
- In use: 11 September 1965 - 16 October 1998

Garrison information
- Occupants: 101st Air Control Squadron

Worcester Air National Guard Station (also known as Worcester Air Station) is a closed United States Air Force station. It was located in Worcester, Massachusetts, in Green Hill Park. It was the home of the Massachusetts Air National Guard's 101st Air Control Squadron until 16 October 1998.

== History ==
Worcester Air Station was located in the Green Hill Park section of Worcester, Massachusetts (50 Skyline Dr Worcester, MA 01605). When the 101st Air Control Squadron was inactivated on 16 October 1998, most of the Worcester Air National Guard Station was handed over to the State of Massachusetts. Today the City of Worcester Worcester Parks, Recreation & Cemetery Division occupies the former 101st Air Control Squadron Headquarters building. The former RADAR tower for the 101st Air Control Squadron can still be seen on the sight in a fenced in area just west of the Parks, Recreation & Cemetery Division building.

Worcester ANGS Water Drainage Map
