= 729th Air Control Squadron =

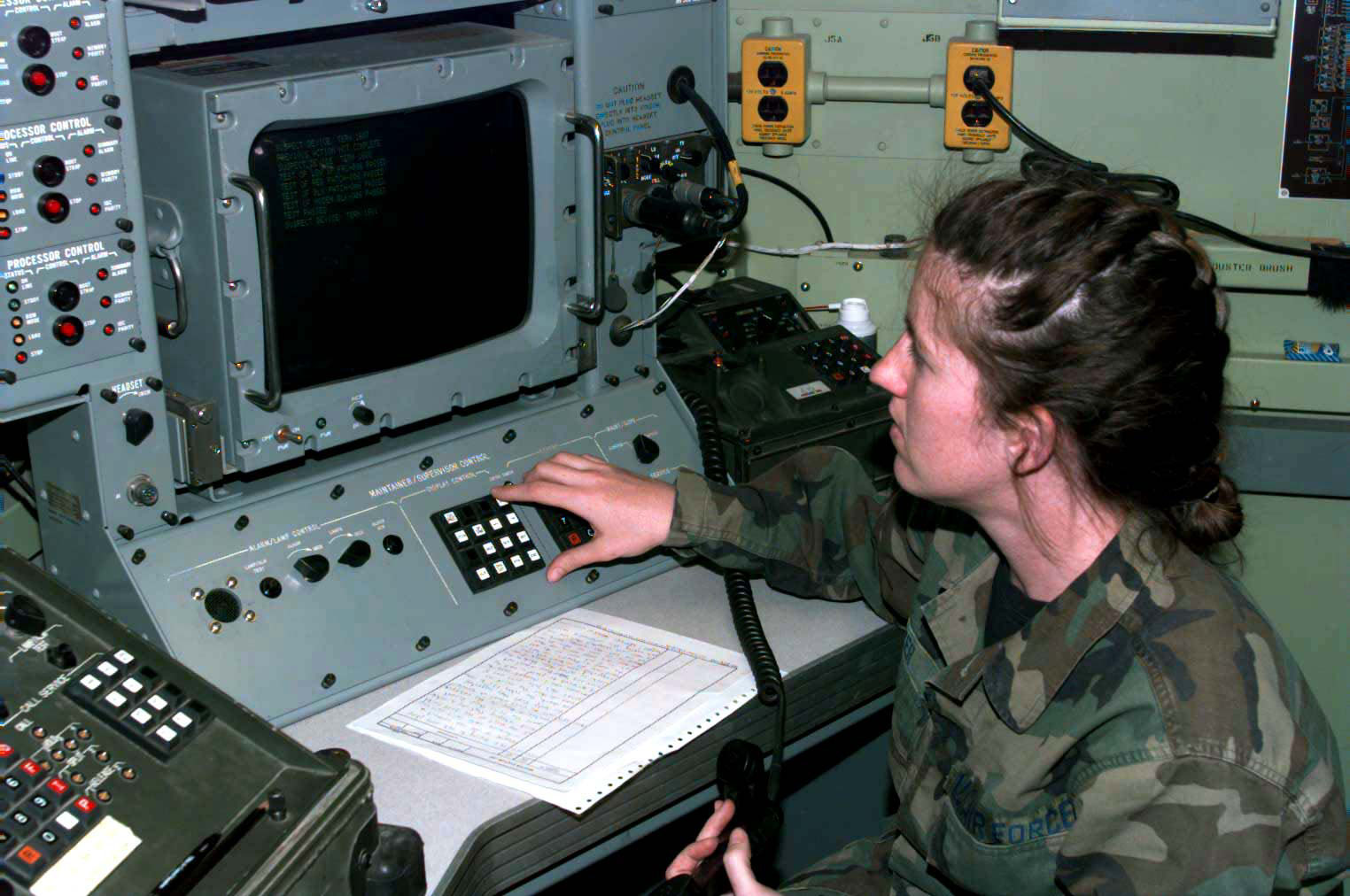
- Squadron member providing communications during Exercise Roving Sands
- Active: 16 February 1951 – 15 July 1958; 6 January 1964 – 15 June 1969; 15 October 1969 – 30 November 1979; 1 October 1985 – present
- Country: United States
- Branch: United States Air Force
- Role: Command and Control
- Part of: Air Combat Command; 15th Air Force; 552d Air Control Wing
- Garrison/HQ: Hill Air Force Base
- Motto: Best in the Field
- Mascot: Angry Warriors
- Decorations: Air Force Meritorious Unit Award; Air Force Outstanding Unit Award

Insignia
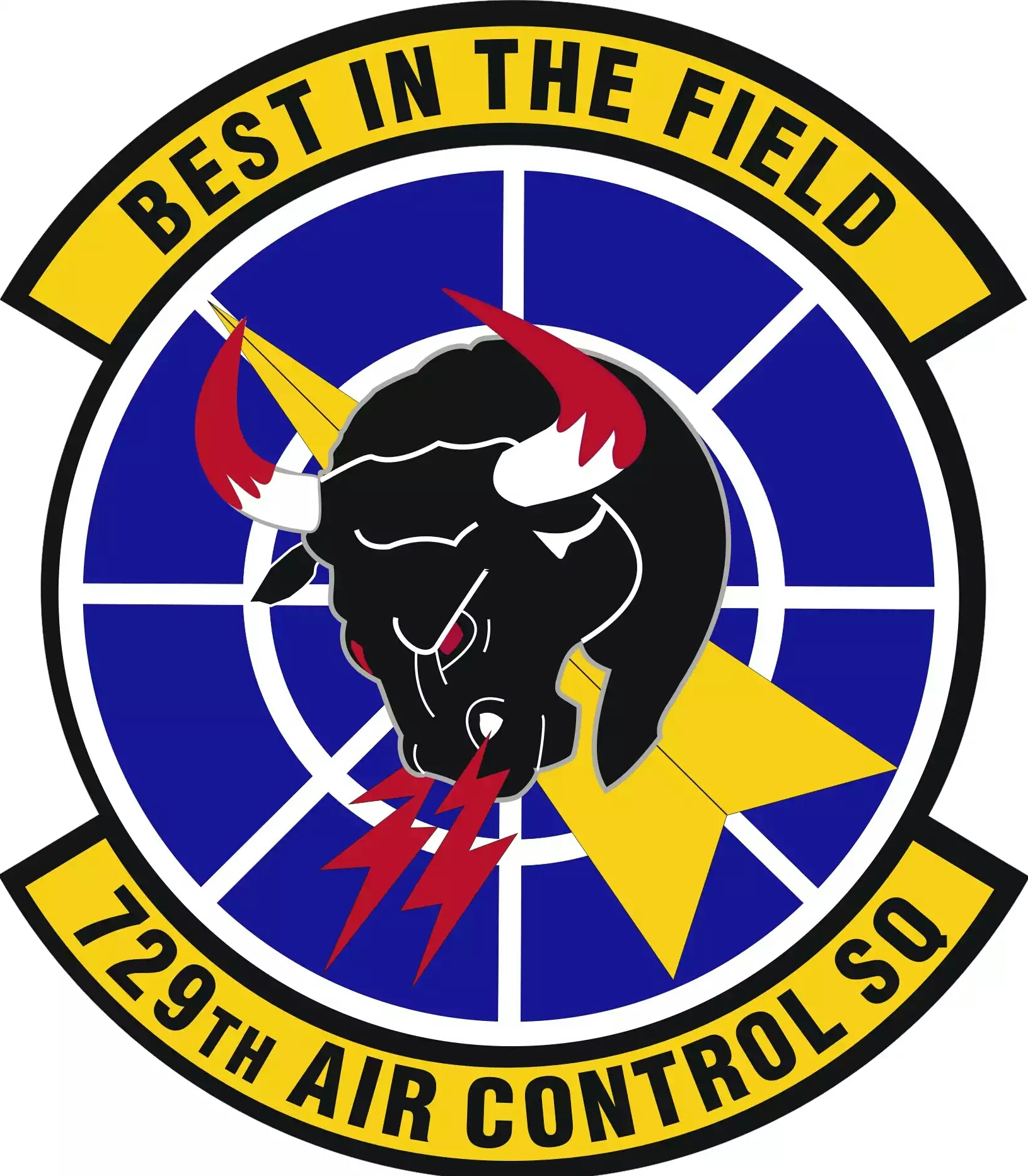
- 729th Air Control Squadron emblem (Note: Dedcription: On a disc Azure, a target of two concentric circles and crosshairs Argent, charged with a delta flight symbol point to dexter chief Or, overall a bull couped at the neck Sable, horned and detailed of the second [color], horns and eye embellished Gules, emitting from the nostrils two lightning bolts of the like [color]; all within a narrow Black border. Meaning: Ultramarine blue and Air Force yellow are the Air Force colors. Blue alludes to the sky, the primary theater of Air Force operations. Yellow refers to the sun and the excellence required of Air Force personnel. The bull symbolizes the strength, stamina, and durability of the squadron. The smoke snorts as lightning bolts represent the electronic control and surveillance of the skies provided by the squadron. The stylized aircraft symbolizes the strength of airpower and with the radar scope/target signifies the squadron's worldwide capability for deployment.)

The 729th Air Control Squadron is a Control and Reporting Center (CRC) assigned to the 552d Air Control Group, 552d Air Control Wing. The 729th's mission is focused around providing air control (radar) services for combat air operations. Officially, the 729th provides a mobile, combat-rated, senior radar element of the Theater Air Control System for worldwide contingencies. Additionally the 729th provides combat and control of joint air operations by conducting surveillance identification, weapons control, Battle Management and theater communications data link.

The squadron provides the theater Air Force commander a rapid reaction mobile air control system and control and reporting center during worldwide contingencies. It also provides command and control of joint air operations through surveillance, identification, weapons control, theater missile defense, battle management and theater communications data links.
