= 552nd Air Control Group =

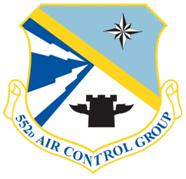
- 552nd Air Control Group Emblem
- Country: United States
- Branch: Air Force
- Type: Command and Control
- Part of: Air Combat Command; 15th Air Force; 552d Air Control Wing
- Garrison/HQ: Tinker Air Force Base
- Website: www.552acw.acc.af.mil/About-Us/Fact-Sheets/Display/Article/430828/552nd-air-control-group/

The 552nd Air Control Group is a subordinate unit of the 552nd Air Control Wing of the United States Air Force and is responsible for operations, maintenance, training, and combat support for three combat-coded Control and Reporting Centers. Additionally, the Group provides software and ground communications for the E-3 Airborne Warning and Control System fleet. The group consists of one air control networks squadron, an operations support squadron, one geographically separated training squadron, and three geographically separated air control squadrons. It is located at Tinker Air Force Base near Oklahoma City in Oklahoma.

== History ==
The 552nd Air Control Group was activated on 1 May 2008 and was built upon the foundation of the 552d Communications Group. The group has a rich heritage and takes great pride in the accomplishments of its Airmen. The 552nd Mission Support Deputate was established in August 1975 to provide E-3 software support. Over the next year, approximately 150 personnel arrived and established the software support facility and prepared to receive the first Boeing AWACS software release. The first ground support computer for software development and post-mission analysis was delivered in January 1977.

The first Boeing software release was delivered in February 1977, followed by the first E-3 delivery to the Air Force in March 1977. Since the first software release, there have been 13 major Boeing software upgrades and 45 Air Force-developed versions of the software. Since 1975, group personnel have deployed to ELF ONE, Operations Desert Shield/Storm, Provide Comfort, Southern Watch, Northern Watch, Deny Flight, Desert Fox, Uphold/Maintain Democracy, Allied Force, Operation Iraqi Freedom, and Enduring Freedom. Participation in counter-drug operations has also led to deployments to Panama, Curaçao, Ecuador, and Puerto Rico.

Post-mission analysis has been provided to numerous customers including the National Transportation Safety Board, Drug Enforcement Administration, U.S. Navy, U.S. Army, Defense Intelligence Agency, National Security Agency, and the North Atlantic Treaty Organization. In addition, this analysis has supported air launched cruise missile testing, B-1 Bomber testing, the USS Stark investigation, F-117 and F-22 Stealth Fighter testing, Red/Green Flag exercises, and enabled the complete air war history of Operation DESERT STORM.

The Mission Support Deputate's history came to a close on May 29, 1992, and the 552nd Computer Group activated. On 1 July 1994, the 552nd Computer Systems Group was activated with two subordinate squadrons: the 752d Computer Systems Squadron and the 552nd Computer Systems Squadron. Once again, on 8 August 2003, the 752nd Computer Systems Squadron was redesignated the 752nd Communications Squadron, and on 5 September 2003, the 552nd Computer Systems Group was redesignated as the 552nd Communications Group. The name changes were made to more correctly identify the worldwide mission of the group and its subordinate squadrons.

Finally, on 1 May 2008, the 552nd Communications Group was de-activated, and the 552nd Air Control Group was activated in its place. Along with the activation of the Air Control Group came the addition of the four active duty Air Control Squadrons.

== Subordinate Units ==
=== 552nd Air Control Networks Squadron ===
The 552d Air Control Networks Squadron is responsible for the entire AWACS software project lifecycle, as well as providing ground communications support for E-3 AWACS both in-garrison and deployed. The squadron supports the Wing through control of AWACS combat software and mission support software, and well as being responsible for the data link interoperability testing and certification of E-3 aircraft with other joint and allied command, control, and communications platforms. Additionally, the builds, issues, and tracks Communications Security (COMSEC) and mission software kits, provides post-mission archival of E-3 data, and operate and maintain the wing's $3 million mainframe computer system.

=== 752nd Operations Support Squadron ===
The 752nd Operations Support Squadron provides dedicated support to geographically separated combat coded and training Air Control Squadrons. In addition, the squadron plans and supports worldwide contingency operations in support of combatant commanders.

=== Air Control Squadrons ===
The 607th Air Control Squadron conducts formal initial qualification training (IQT) for Air Control Squadron operations crew personnel in command and control tactics, techniques, and procedures (TTP) and provides an understanding of theater level execution.

The 726th and 729th Air Control Squadrons provide a mobile, combat-rated, senior radar element of the Theater Air Control System for worldwide contingencies. The squadrons also provide command and control of joint air operations through surveillance, identification, weapons control, theater missile defense, battle management and theater communications data links.
