= Control and Reporting Centre =

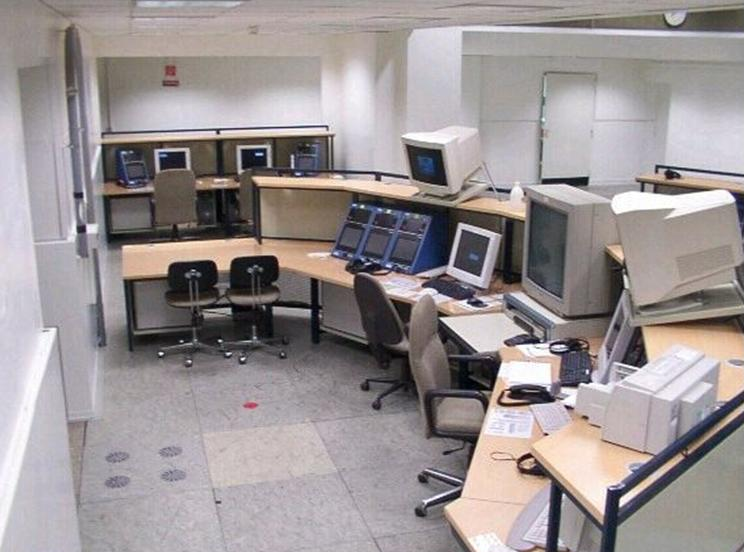
Former CRC in Brockzetel/Aurich of the German Air Force, 2010

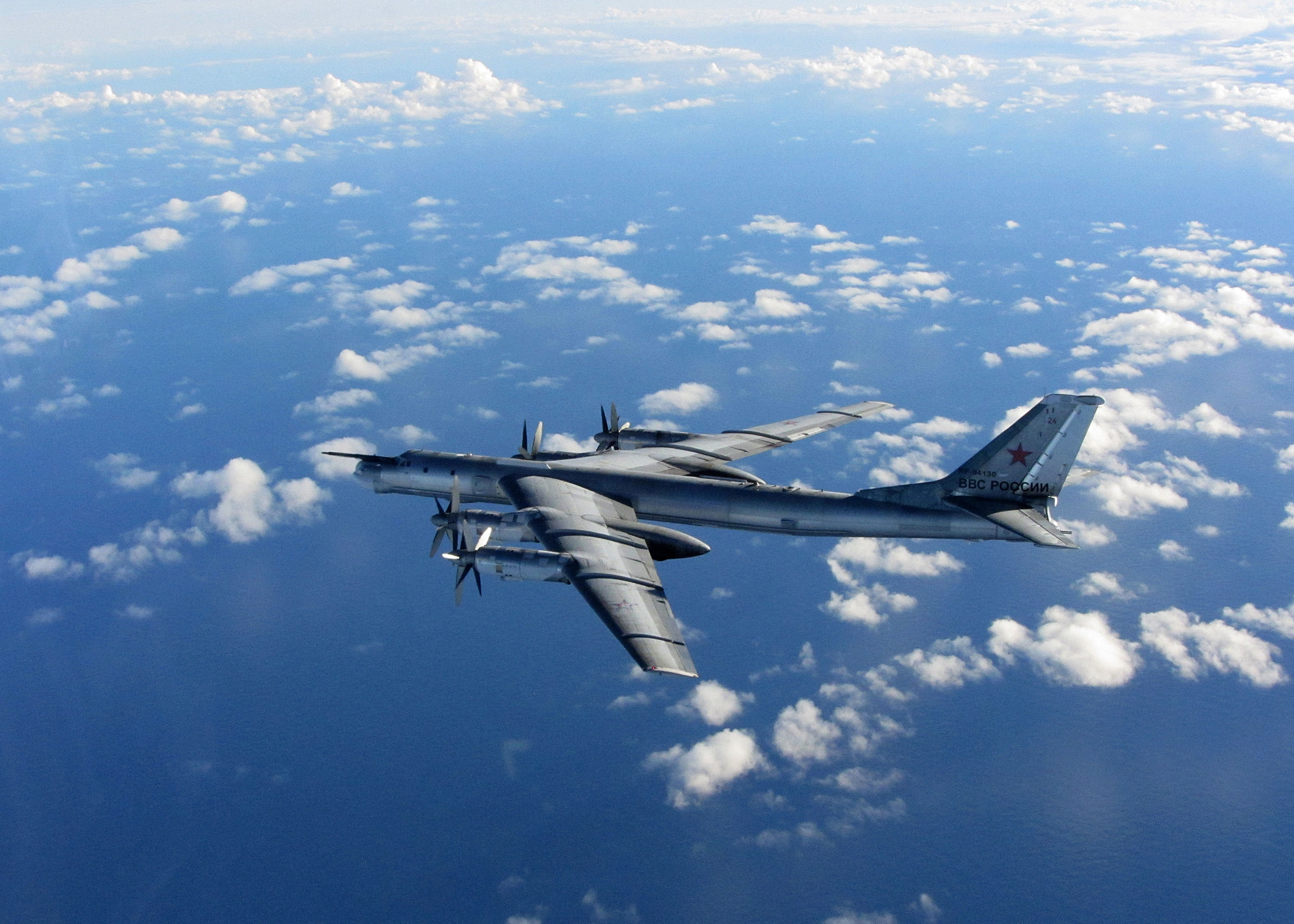
Russian Bear 'H' photographed from an RAF Typhoon QRA aircraft controlled by RAF CRC Boulmer

A Control and Reporting Centre (CRC) is according to the Joint Chiefs of Staff publication 1.02 defined as: "A subordinated air control element of the tactical air control centre for which radar control and warning operations are conducted within its area of responsibility."

Control and Reporting Posts (CRP) & Reporting Posts (RP), which provide radar control and surveillance within their defined areas of responsibility, may operate under the control of a CRC.

NATO operates ACC Systems in static or deployable CRC's in order to provide Airspace Surveillance, to control Air Force Operations and to meet national and allied military commitments. In NATO Europe a CRC might be subordinated to a Combined Air Operations Centre (CAOC) and / or to an equivalent national Air Operation Centre.

== CRC in NATO Europe ==
Command Air (CCA)
Designation	Location		Country	Remark
CAOC UD	Uedem	51°40'50"N 6°18'20"E	Germany	Responsible for NATO airspace north of the Alps
CAOC TJ	Torrejon	40°30'12"N 3°27'25"W	Spain	Responsible for NATO airspace south of the Alps
DACCC PR	Poggio Renatico	44°47'30"N 11°29'50"E	Italy	Homebase of NATO WW deployable Air C2 Center
CRC	Beauvechain		Belgium	National Air Defence Operations
CRC	Hlavenec	50°12'28"N 14°41'22"E	Czechia	National Air Defence Operations
CRC	Karup	56°25'50"N 9°14'50"E	Denmark	National Air Defence Operations
CRC	Cinq Mars la Pile	47°21'6"N 0°27'47"E	France	National Air Defence Operations
CRC	Loperhet	48°24'10"N 4°18'54"W	France	National Air Defence Operations
CRC	Lyon Mt.Verdun	45°51'10"N 4°47'1"E	France	National Air Defence Operations
CRC	Mont de Marsan	43°55'20"N 0°29'42"W	France	National Air Defence Operations
CRC	Erndtebrück	50°59'36"N 8°14'25"E	Germany	National Air Defence Operations
CRC	Schönewalde	51°48'38"N 13°11'26"E	Germany	National Air Defence Operations
CRC	Larissa	39°37'47"N 22°24'18"E	Greece	National Air Defence Operations
CRC	Licola	40°53'31"N 14° 2'27"E	Italy	National Air Defence Operations
ARS	Poggio Renatico		Italy	National Air Defence Operations
CRC	Nieuw Milligen	52° 18′ 58″ N, 4° 56′ 34″ E	Netherlands	National Air Defence Operations
CRC	Sørreisa	69°3'36"N 17°59'57"E	Norway	National Air Defence Operations
CRC	Monsanto	38º43'46"N 9º11'24"W	Portugal	National Air Defence Operations
CRC	Eskişehir	39°24'51"N 29°51'27"E	Turkey	National Air Defence Operations
CRC	RAF Boulmer	55°24'28"N 1°37'17"W	United Kingdom	National Air Defence Operations
