= 103rd Air Control Squadron =

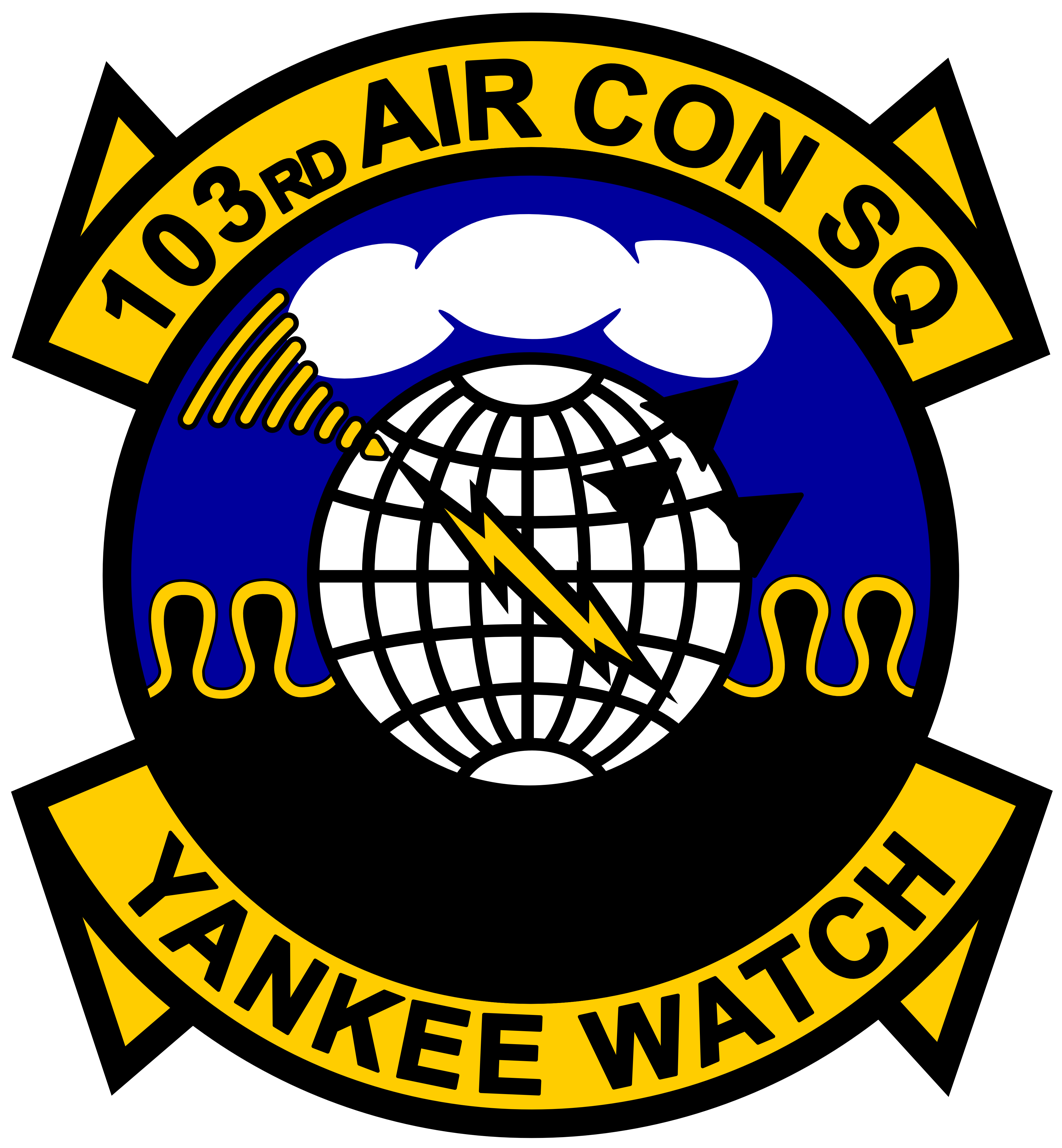
- Official patch and logo for the 103rd Air Control Squadron, Connecticut Air National Guard.
- Active: 1946 – present
- Country: United States
- Branch: Air National Guard
- Type: Command and Control
- Role: "To meet state and federal mission responsibilities."
- Garrison/HQ: Orange Air National Guard Station, Orange, Connecticut
- Nickname: "Yankee Watch"
- Decorations: Presidential Unit Citation, Meritorious Unit Award, Outstanding Unit Award

Commanders
- Civilian leadership: President Donald Trump (Commander-in-Chief); Frank Kendall III (Secretary of the Air Force); Governor Ned Lamont (Governor of the State of Connecticut)
- State military leadership: Major General Francis J. Evon Jr. (TAG); Brigadier General Gerald McDonald (AAG)

103rd Air Control Squadron is a National Guard squadron assigned to the Connecticut Air National Guard. It provides theater command with air battle management, radar surveillance, air space control, and long haul communication capabilities to plan and execute combined air operations, air superiority and air strike ground attack operations, and provides state authorities with a dedicated force ready to react to local and national emergencies. The unit is located on Orange Air National Guard Station in Orange, CT.

== See also ==
- Connecticut Air National Guard
