= Embry–Riddle Aeronautical University, Daytona Beach =

Private university in Daytona Beach, Florida, U.S.

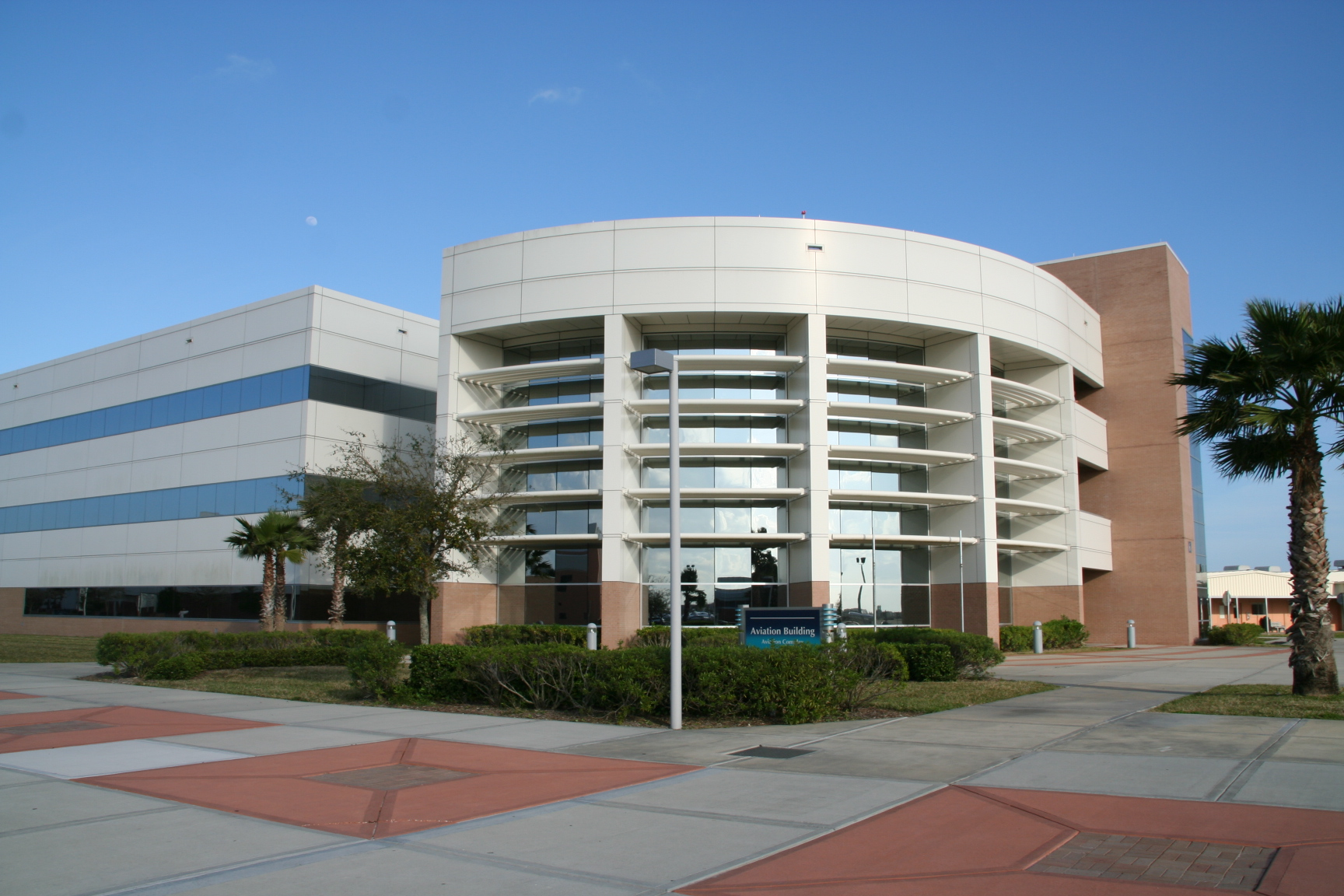
- The Aviation Building
- Former names: Embry–Riddle Company (1926–1939); Embry–Riddle School of Aviation (1939–1965); Embry–Riddle Aeronautical Institute (1965–1970)
- Type: Private university
- Established: 1965
- Founders: T. Higbee Embry and John Paul Riddle
- Parent institution: Embry–Riddle Aeronautical University
- Faculty: 1,070
- Students: 7,603
- Location: 1 Aerospace Blvd, Daytona Beach, Florida, Florida, 32114, United States; 29.1886°N 81.0487°W
- Campus: 185 acres (75 ha); Urban
- Colors: Blue & Gold (academics) Blue and Gold (athletics)
- Nickname: Eagles
- Sporting affiliations: NCAA Division II – Sunshine State
- Mascot: Ernie the Eagle
- Website: daytonabeach.erau.edu

Embry–Riddle Aeronautical University, Daytona Beach is a residential campus of Embry–Riddle Aeronautical University, a private university focused on aviation and aerospace programs, and it is located in Daytona Beach, Florida. The university offers associate, bachelor's, master's, and doctoral degree programs in arts, sciences, aviation, business, and engineering.

== History ==
Embry–Riddle began in 1925 as the "Embry–Riddle Company", an aircraft dealer and airmail provider, founded by Talton Higbee Embry and John Paul Riddle in Cincinnati, Ohio. In 1926, the company added a flight school. In 1930, Embry–Riddle was incorporated into what is now American Airlines, and the flight school was closed. In 1939, the partners opened a new flight school – "Embry–Riddle School of Aviation" – in Miami, Florida, which provided training in what turned out to be the lead up to World War II. Over time, the flight school expanded beyond pilot training, providing specialized courses in a number of aeronautical sciences; this was eventually recognized with the 1965 name change to "Embry–Riddle Aeronautical Institute", coincident with moving operations to Daytona Beach, Florida. In 1970, the Institute was renamed Embry–Riddle Aeronautical University.

== Campus ==
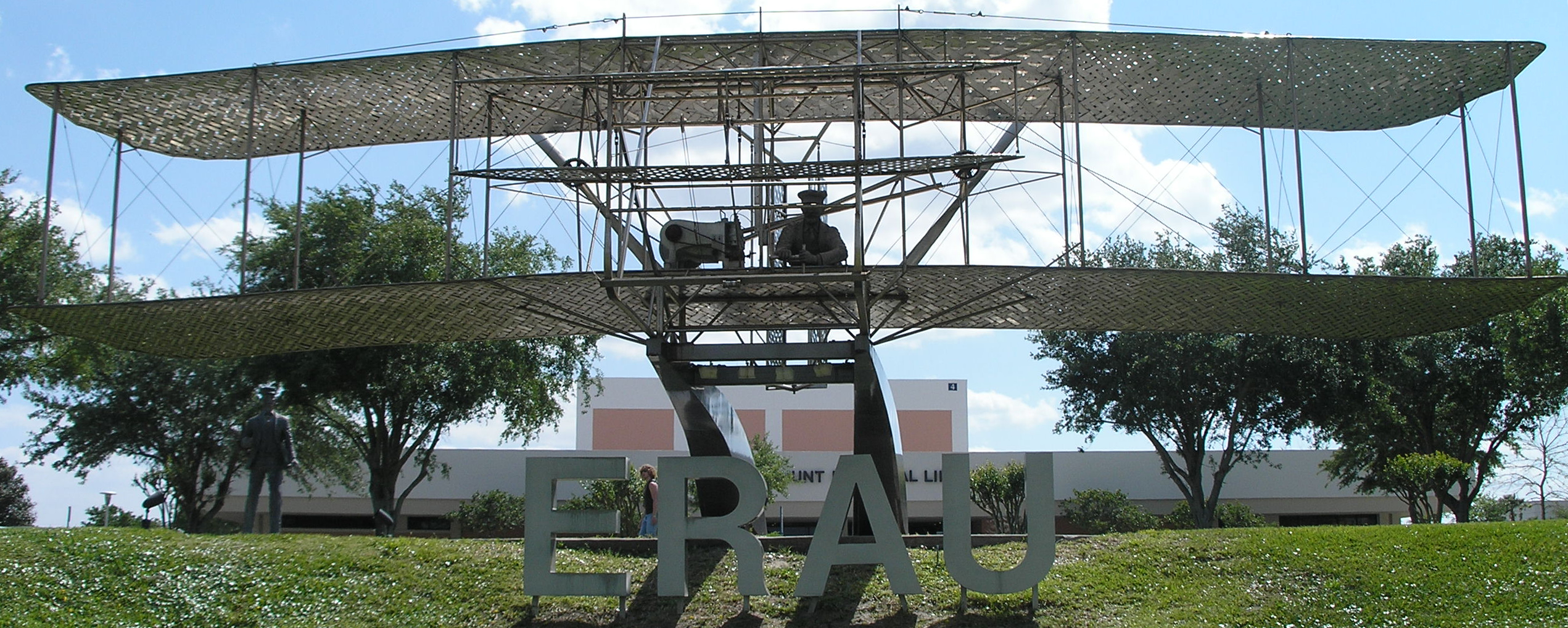
The Wright Flyer statue is the centerpiece of the Daytona Beach campus. The Jack. R. Hunt Memorial Library is visible in the background.

This 185 acre (748,671 m^{2}) site has been the home to Embry–Riddle since 1965. Built adjacent to the Daytona Beach International Airport, the campus has easy access for flight training. The main campus consists of an aviation complex, academic quad and residence halls surrounding the student center and Jack R. Hunt Aviator Park. Athletic facilities are located across Clyde Morris Blvd., anchored by the ICI Center.

The university owns 140 acres (0.57 km^{2}) directly south of the main campus that is developed into a research park. The cornerstone building, the John Mica Engineering and Aerospace Innovation Complex (MicaPlex) was opened in May 2017. An additional building for a subsonic wind tunnel is currently under construction at the same site. An upper classman residence, the Chanute Complex, is approximately two miles south of the main campus.

=== Academic buildings ===
==== Lehman Engineering and Technology Center ====
Engineering classes and facilities (such as the Thermojet solid model printer, the 3024-core Cray CS400 supercomputer "Vega" and wind tunnels) are concentrated in the Lehman Engineering and Technology Center, built in 1995 to facilitate hands-on training in various engineering practices. The three-story facility also includes a number of classrooms and offices for departments within the College of Arts and Sciences and the College of Engineering. The building was built in part with a $12.5 million congressional appropriation in 1994. The building is named for former Florida congressional representative Bill Lehman. There various software titles available to faculty and students in two computer labs within the Lehman Building, including CATIA, Nastran, Pro/ENGINEER, and Matlab.

==== James Hagedorn Aviation Complex ====
The Aviation Complex includes the College of Aviation building, the Advanced Flight Simulation Center, a new College of Maintenance, a new Fleet Maintenance Hangar, and a new Flight Operations building.

The College of Aviation building provides a conducive learning environment for those in the aeronautical sciences as well as the air traffic, meteorology, safety, homeland security and dispatch programs. Opened in 2002, the building houses FAA testing facilities, a flight tutoring lab, weather labs, a spatial disorientation simulator, air safety lab, TRACON and en route air traffic control simulators as well as a control tower simulator.

The Flight Operations building is the home to the flight department. It houses flight dispatch, safety, records, scheduling, chief pilot's, team leaders, ip offices, oral and debrief rooms, and a classroom. It stands out from the rest of the campus because of its tower that houses the flight supervisors office and an interior observation deck.

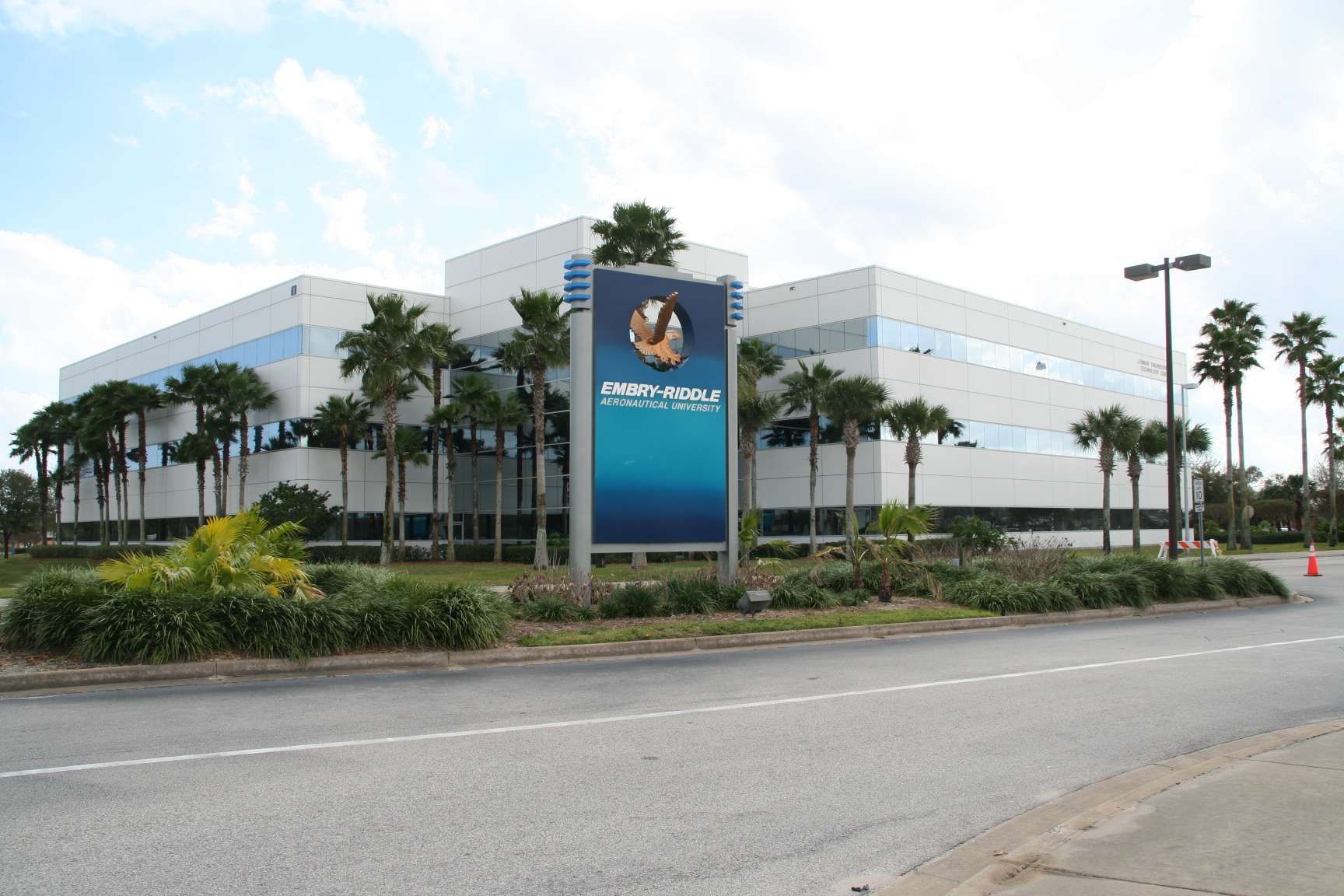
The entrance to Embry Riddle Aeronautical University, the Lehman College of Engineering is in the background.

The Emil Buehler College of Maintenance building is a new 3-story building that houses many maintenance labs and is located in-between the flight operations building and the AMS hangar complex.

The Advanced Flight Simulation Center houses 14 simulators: eight level-six Cessna 172 NAV III simulators, two Diamond DA42 Twinstar simulators, one Bombardier Canadair Regional Jet (CRJ) level-six simulator, and 2 Redbird Crosswind Trainers. The full-motion McDonnell Douglas MD-90 simulator was recently sold and removed from the west sim bay. The simulation center also houses a number of classrooms and offices. This building was badly damaged in the Christmas Day Tornado of 2006 and became fully operational again in June 2007.

The completed complex includes a replacement for the hangar that was destroyed in the tornado Christmas Day 2006.

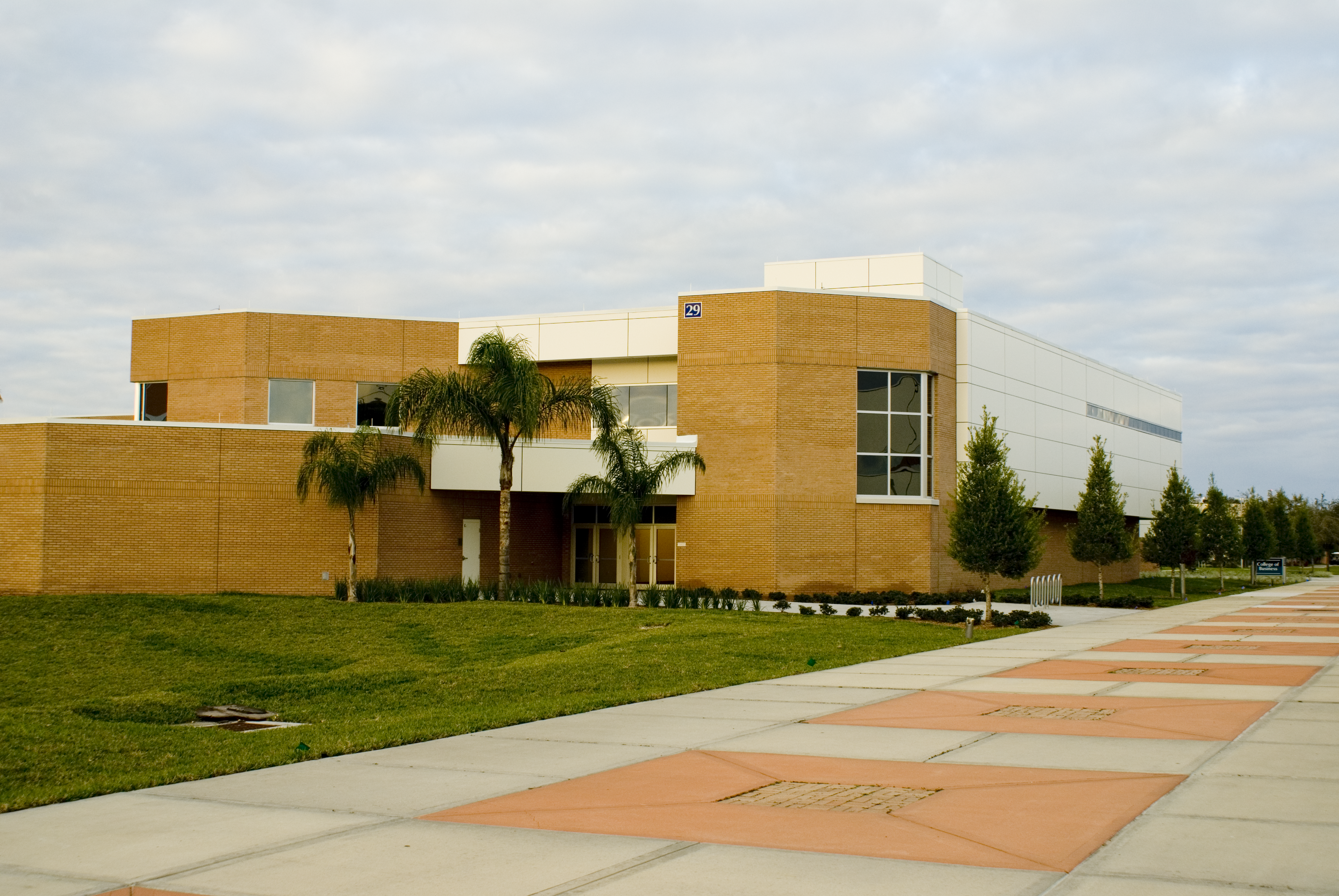
David O'Maley College of Business

==== David O'Maley College of Business building ====
The David O'Maley College of Business building, located next to the College of Aviation building, houses the College of Business as well as the largest computer lab on campus and four relatively large classrooms. The College of Business building is the newest academic building on campus and opened at the beginning of the spring 2008 semester. As of October 30, 2018, the business school name was changed to the David O'Maley College of Business in honor of David O'Maley, a philanthropist and trustee of Embry–Riddle Aeronautical University.

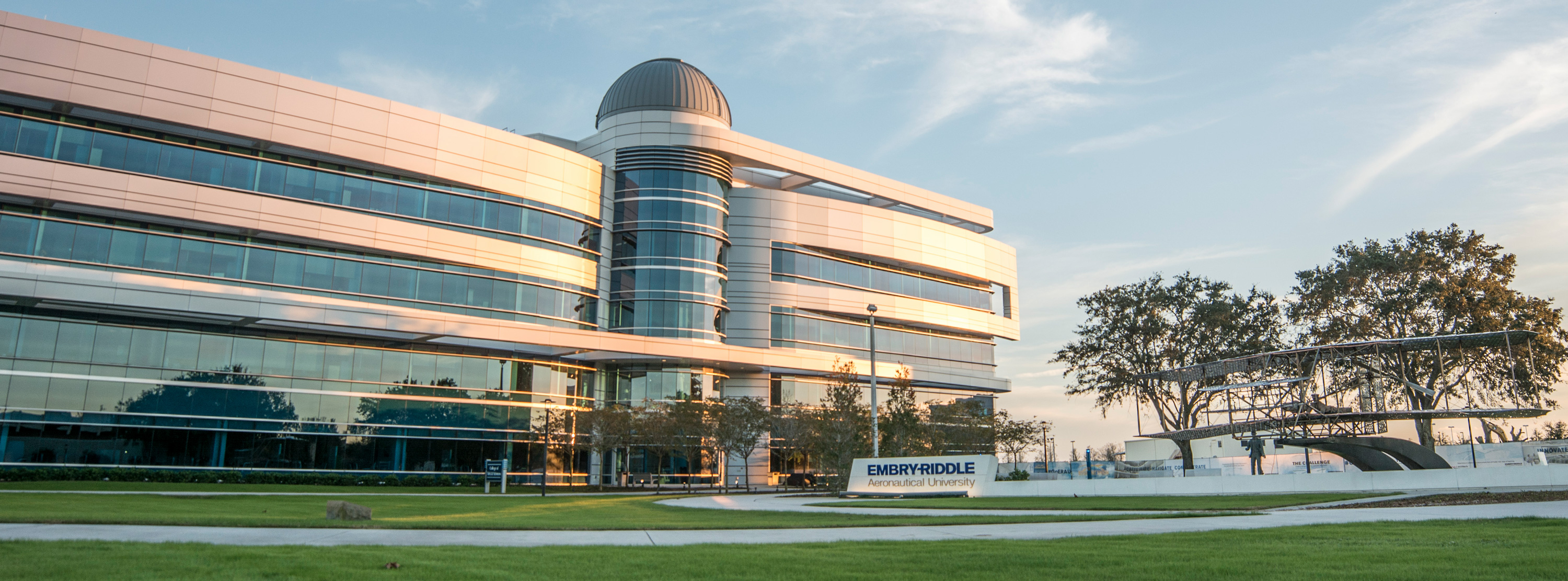
College of Arts and Sciences and the Embry Riddle Observatory

==== College of Arts and Sciences ====
The 140,000-square-foot College of Arts & Sciences building is a diverse learning community comprising five academic departments — Human Factors & Behavioral Neurobiology, Humanities & Communication, Mathematics, Physical Sciences, and Security Studies & International Affairs. The Observatory has the largest telescope in the state of Florida. It is on a free standing 164,313 pound steel structure, that holds up the 18,000 pound telescope.

==== Other academic buildings ====
The 49,000-square-foot (4,600 m^{2}) Jack R. Hunt Memorial Library (JRHML) is the on campus library and contains over 230,000 volumes. The library is noted for having the world's largest collection of NASA and NACA documents as well as a very extensive aviation media collection. NASA personnel have frequently consulted the JRHML for its highly comprehensive collection of NASA documents, most importantly, during the Space Shuttle Columbia disaster investigation. The JRHML has been demolished to make space for the new four-floor Student Union, which features a new library on the top two floors. The building was completed in October of 2018 is and named after Mori Hosseini.

The Capt. Willie Miller Instructional Center contains classrooms and an auditorium for large lectures, presentations or performances.

=== Residences ===
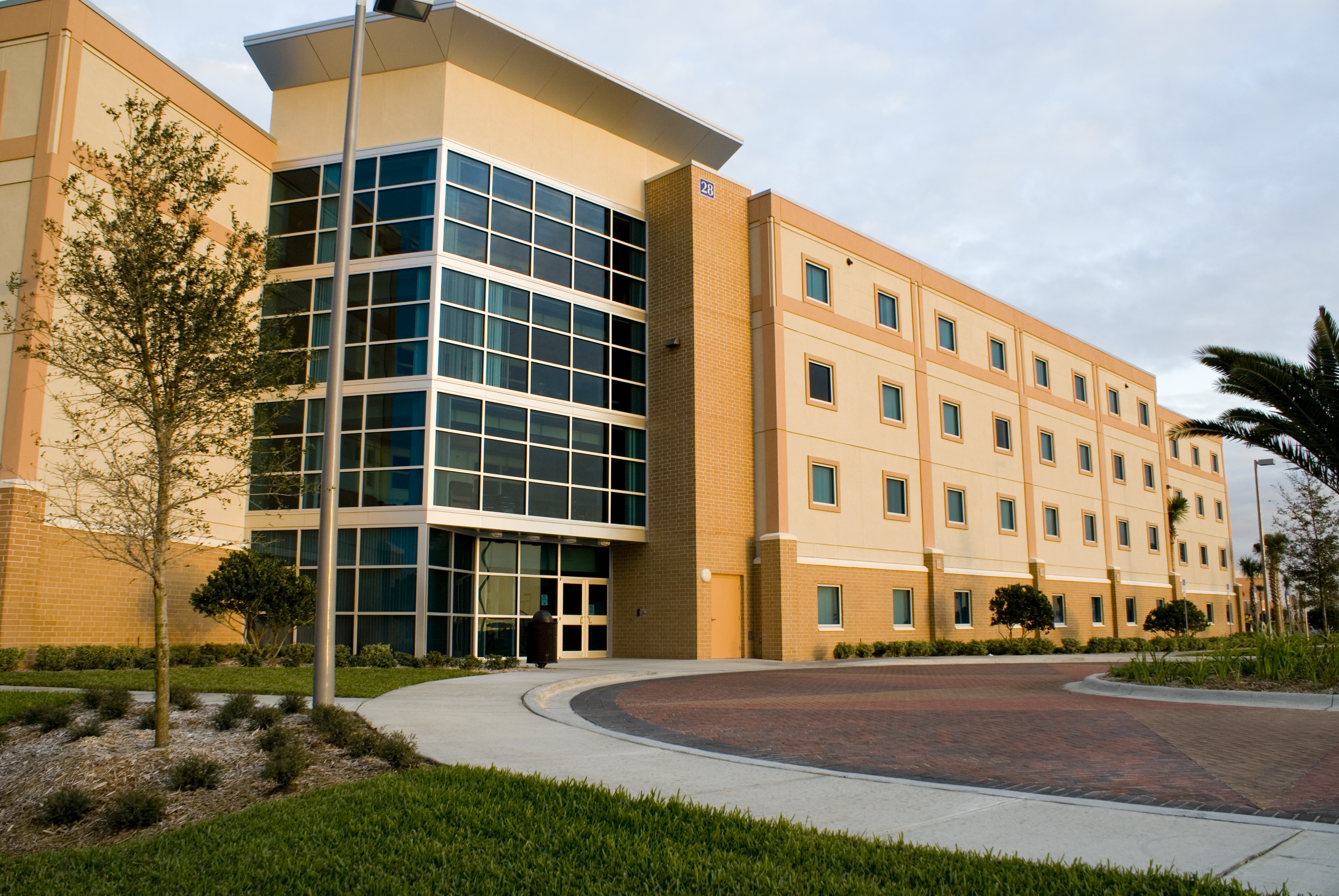
Apollo Hall

Total student capacity in the residence halls is approximately 2,000 students. Over 1,000 students live in the $29 million Student Village residence complex on the north edge of campus. Four residence halls, as well as two food venues, housing offices, and the office of the Embry Riddle Resident Student Association, are contained within the Student Village. Doolittle Hall was built in 1968 and it is named after General Jimmy Doolittle (1896-1993) famous for the Doolittle Raid during World War II.> Doolittle it is a three-story residence hall typical of traditional university housing and is designated for first-year students. It is located near the center of campus.

New Residence Hall 1 opened in January 2017 and is located near the center of campus. This five-story facility offers suite-style living to first-year students. New Residence Halls 2 and 3 were completed in 2019 and 2021, respectively. Apollo Hall officially opened for the fall 2007 semester and houses 256 residents. The Chanute Complex is a residential complex 1.5 miles (2.4 km) to the south of the main campus of the university and is named for aviation pioneer Octave Chanute. Construction of New Residence Hall 4 began in October of 2025.

=== Student facilities ===
Students make regular use of the Mori Hosseini Student Union, located in the center of campus. The student center includes several dining facilities. It also has offices for the Student Government Association, Touch-N-Go Productions (campus entertainment), Greek life, The Avion Newspaper and The WIKD 102.5 FM. Many university offices, such as Campus Safety and the Dean of Student's office, are also housed in the student center. The second floor of the union includes a rooftop lounge, gaming area, and study rooms. The third floor and fourth floor host the library and other offices such as Student Employment, Title IX Office and Career Services. The student union also includes an events center and campus bookstore.

Other student facilities include the 5,300-square-foot (490 m^{2}) Interfaith Chapel, ICI Center gym, and intramural sports fields. A two-story, 12,500-square-foot (1,160 m^{2}) fitness center was opened in August 2007, next to the pool. A new fitness center was opened in late 2022.

The old fitness center was repurposed into the Boeing Center for Aviation & Aerospace Safety, the product of a $5.1 million donation by the Boeing Company to the university. Directed by former NTSB chairman Robert L. Sumwalt, the center opened in January 2024.

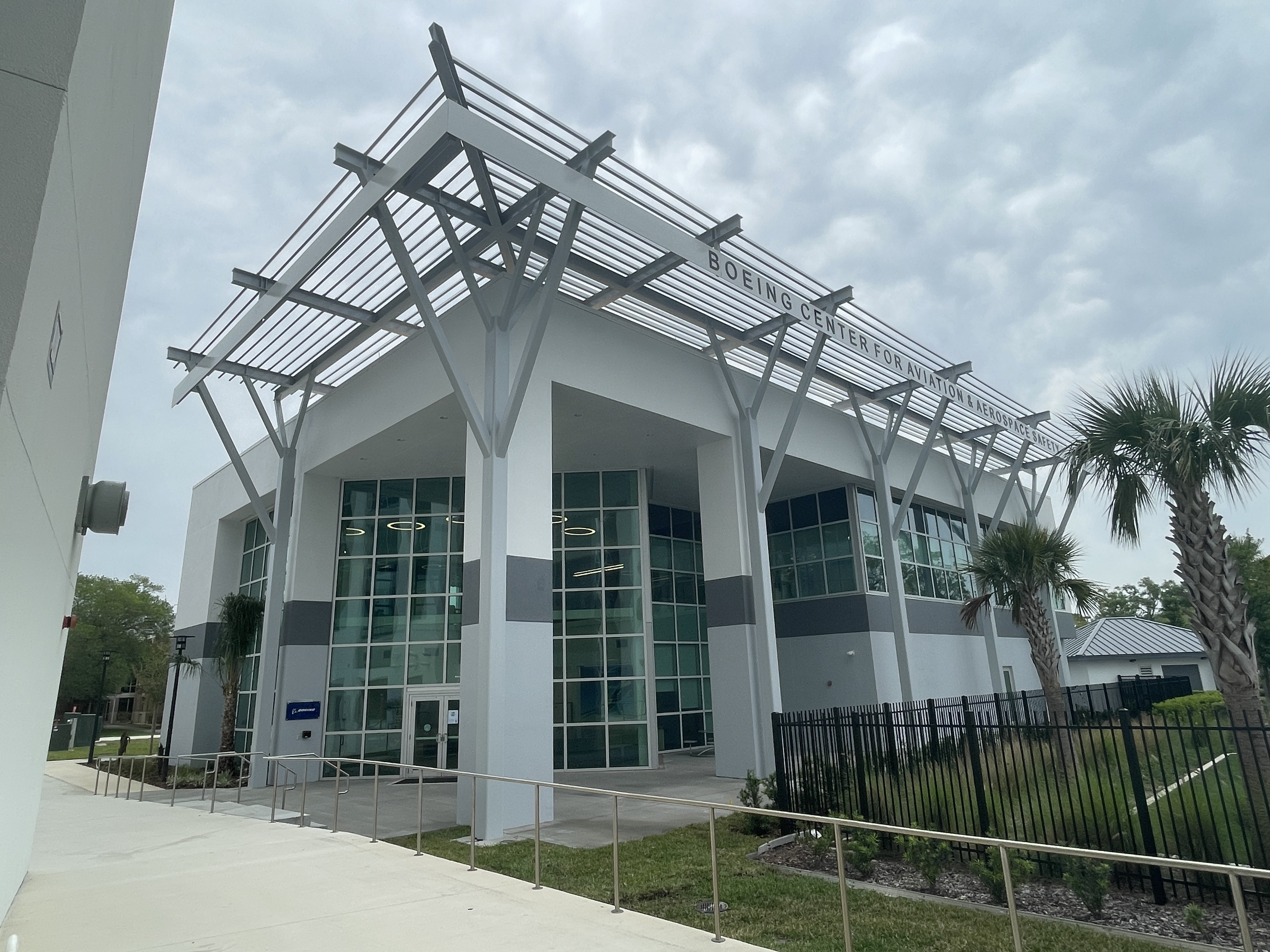
The Boeing Center for Aviation and Aerospace Safety at Embry-Riddle Aeronautical University, Daytona Beach

== Organization ==
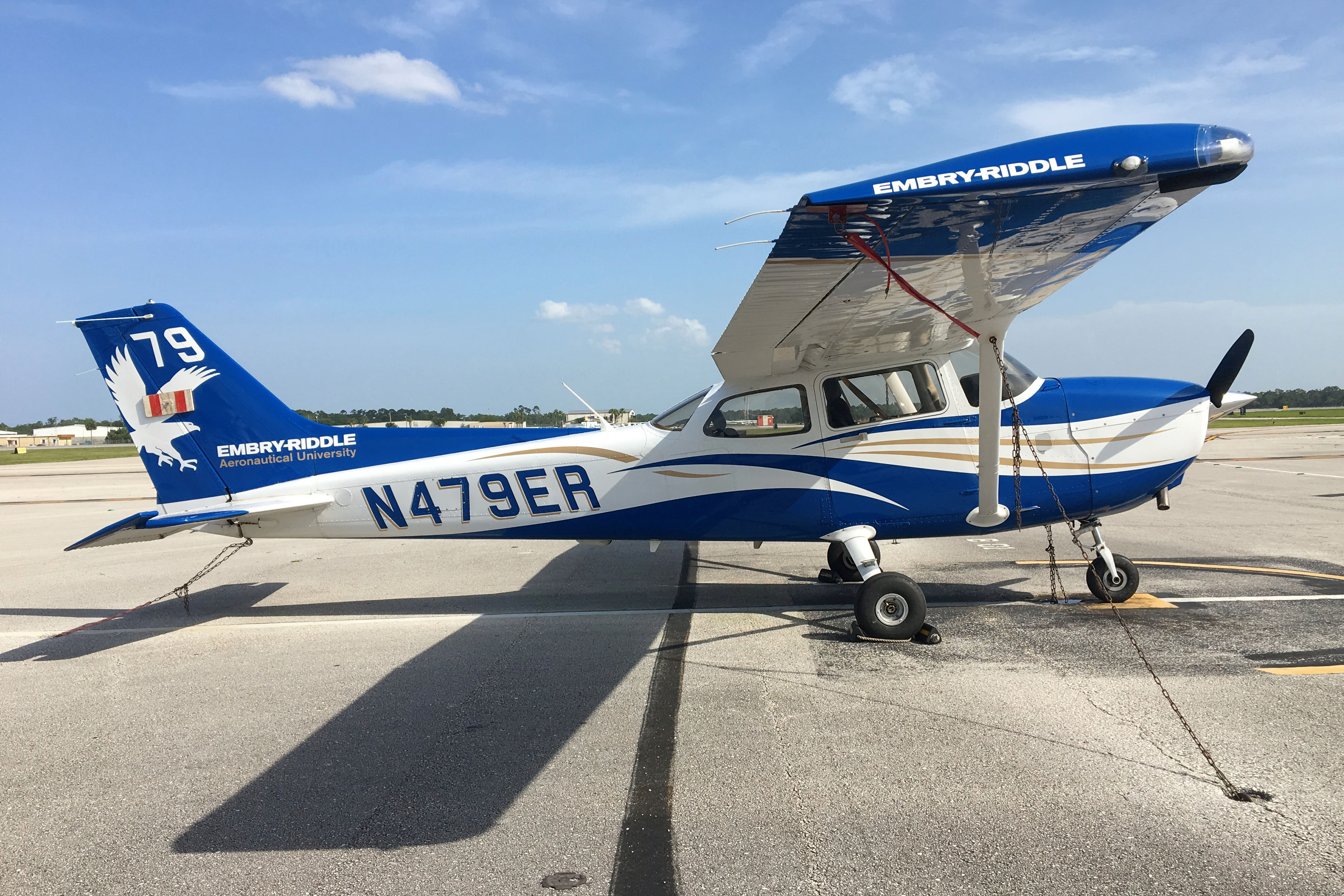
A Cessna 172 aircraft used for training

Embry–Riddle's Daytona Beach campus is the larger of two residential campuses that form Embry–Riddle Aeronautical University. The campus serves as the academic and administrative headquarters of the university and also is home to the headquarters of the worldwide campus.

Academics at the Daytona Beach campus are organized into four colleges. Each college is served by a college dean, who reports to the provost. Colleges are then organized into departments. Non-academic departments are organized under the president. Academics at the campus are organized by subject into the following colleges:

=== College of Arts and Sciences ===
- Department of Human Factors
- Department of Physical Sciences
- Department of Mathematics
- Department of Security Studies & International Studies
- Department of Humanities and Communication
  - ROTC (Reserve Officer Training Corps)
    - Air Force ROTC
    - Army ROTC
    - Naval/Marine ROTC

=== College of Aviation ===
- Aeronautical Science Department
- Applied Aviation Sciences Department
- Aviation Maintenance Science Department
- Flight Department

=== College of Business ===
- Department of Economics, Finance, and Information
- Department of Management, Marketing, and Operations

==== College of Engineering ====
- Aerospace Engineering Department
- Electrical, Computer, Software, and Systems Engineering Department
- Engineering Fundamentals (formerly Freshman Engineering)
- Mechanical and Engineering Science Engineering Department
- Civil Engineering Department

== Academics ==
Embry-Riddle Aeronautical University, also known as “The Harvard of the Skies,” is one of the top universities in the world for aviation and aerospace.

Aeronautical science (flight training) and aerospace engineering are the two most popular degrees at the Daytona Beach campus. Daytona Beach's aerospace engineering degree program ranked number one in the U.S. News & World Report college rankings of aerospace engineering degree schools without a Ph.D. program each year in 2001-2005 since the category was introduced in 2001. The university now has a Ph.D. program in aerospace engineering.

Embry–Riddle's Daytona Beach campus has an extensive ROTC program, and one of the nation's largest Air Force ROTC programs. Their Air Force ROTC program frequently wins national competitions.

As of 2007, the engineering physics program at the Daytona Beach campus was the largest undergraduate engineering physics program in the country, and the only one specializing in aerospace. As a result, the aerospace engineering program has been reclassified and Embry-Riddle's Aeronautics/Aerospace Engineering program is tied for 8th position in the 2023 US News and World Report rankings for Best Aerospace / Aeronautical / Astronautical Engineering Undergraduate Programs overall.

== Student life ==
Embry–Riddle's Daytona Beach Campus total enrollment is 8,370 including 841 graduate students. 27% are female and 73% are male. International students make up 10.2% of the Daytona Beach Campus's enrollment. Aviation interests characterize most of the student body, though particularly among the aerospace engineering and aeronautical science majors. Daytona Beach has over 130 student organizations, including 10 fraternities and four sororities. Other prominent student organizations include the Eagles Flight Team, which competes in the National Intercollegiate Flying Association, the Eagles Sport Aviation Club, Model United Nations team, the Embry–Riddle Muscle Car Association and the Student Government Association.

== Athletics ==
The athletic teams of Embry–Riddle's Daytona Beach (main) campus are called the Eagles. The university is a member of the NCAA Division II ranks, primarily competing in the Sunshine State Conference (SSC) as a provisional member since the 2015–16 academic year for most their sports (achieving D-II full member status in 2017–18); while its men's and women's track and field teams compete in the Peach Belt Conference (PBC) as associate members. Prior to joining the NCAA and the SSC, the Eagles previously competed in the National Association of Intercollegiate Athletics (NAIA) as a founding member of the Sun Conference (formerly known as the Florida Sun Conference (FSC) until after the 2007–08 school year) from 1990–91 to 2014–15.

ERAU–Daytona Beach competes in 22 intercollegiate varsity sports: Men's sports include baseball, basketball, cross country, golf, lacrosse, rowing, soccer, tennis and track & field (indoor and outdoor); while women's sports include basketball, cross country, golf, lacrosse, rowing, soccer, softball, tennis, track & field (indoor and outdoor) and volleyball; and co-ed sports include cheerleading.

=== Accomplishments ===
Embry–Riddle enjoyed great success in the NAIA and The Sun Conference, winning 104 Sun Conference regular season titles, 32 conference tournament crowns, 29 individual national titles, as well as team national championships in men's basketball (2000) and men's tennis (2013). Embry–Riddle's student-athletes have also proven to be very successful in the classroom, as evidenced by the 321 NAIA scholar-athletes and 80 CoSIDA Academic All-Americans since 1990. Embry–Riddle has had 59 of those CoSIDA Academic All-Americans come since 2010, which is the 11th-highest total among NCAA schools across all three divisions.

Embry–Riddle has served as the host for several NAIA National Championships in recent years. The Eagles hosted the 2002 and 2003 NAIA Men's and Women's Golf National Championships and also served as host of the 2004 NAIA Women's Golf National Championship at LPGA International. In addition, Embry–Riddle hosted the 2005 and 2006 NAIA Men's Soccer National Championship, the 2007 and 2008 NAIA Women's Soccer National Championship. The Embry–Riddle Soccer Stadium was upgraded in 2005 specifically to host the 2005 event, and can seat 1,000 fans. Embry–Riddle's athletic department is led by John Phillips, who was named director of athletics in January 2014.

=== Ice hockey ===
Embry–Riddle also fields an ice hockey team in AAU College Hockey, ERAU was formerly a part of the American Collegiate Hockey Association; they began play in the AAU in 2021. They play in the College Hockey South Conference. Their current head coach is Bob Joyce. They play their home games at Daytona Ice Arena in South Daytona. The team qualified for the 2020 ACHA National Tournament but was cancelled due to the COVID-19 pandemic. The team also qualified for the 2021-2022, 2022-2023 and 2023-2024 national tournaments.

== Notable faculty ==
Name	Department	Title
Kenneth Rowe	Aerospace Engineering	Associate Professor
Robert L. Sumwalt	Aviation and Aerospace Safety	Executive Director
John P. Johnson		5th President
Reda R. Mankbadi	Engineering College	Founding Dean
Alan Pratt	Humanities	Professor
Stathis Kefallonitis	Marketing	Professor
Kenneth L. Tallman		President, 1981–1986

== See also ==
- Embry–Riddle Aeronautical University, Prescott
- List of Embry–Riddle Aeronautical University alumni
- List of aerospace engineering schools
- Embry–Riddle Observatory
- The Avion Newspaper (Daytona Beach Student Newspaper)
- WIKD-LP The WIKD 102.5 FM (Daytona Beach Campus Radio Station)
- Independent Colleges and Universities of Florida (ICUF)
