= WIKD =

WIKD may refer to:

- WIKD-LP, a low-power radio station WIKD-LP (102.5 FM) licensed to Daytona Beach, Florida, United States
- Bulutumbang Airport in Tanjung Pandan, Indonesia
