= Airlift International =

US scheduled cargo airline (1945–1992)

Airlift International Riddle Airlines Riddle Aviation Company
IATA	ICAO	Call sign
RD	AIR	AIRLIFT; RIDDLE
- Founded: 28 May 1945 incorporated in Florida as Riddle Aviation Company as Riddle Airlines from 3 December 1952 as Airlift International from 16 March 1964
- Ceased operations: June 1992
- Operating bases: Miami, Florida
- Fleet size: See Fleet
- Destinations: See Destinations
- Headquarters: Miami, Florida; United States
- Key people: Arthur Vining Davis; James B. Franklin; Paul J. Finazzo
- Founder: John Paul Riddle

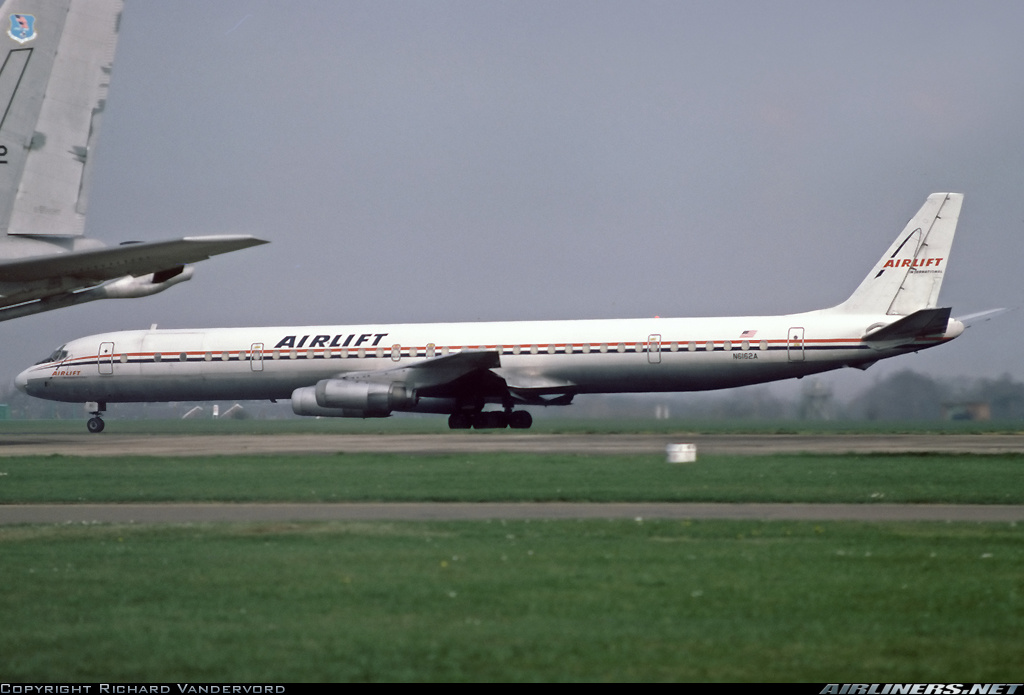
DC-8-63CF at Mildenhall, UK, 1976

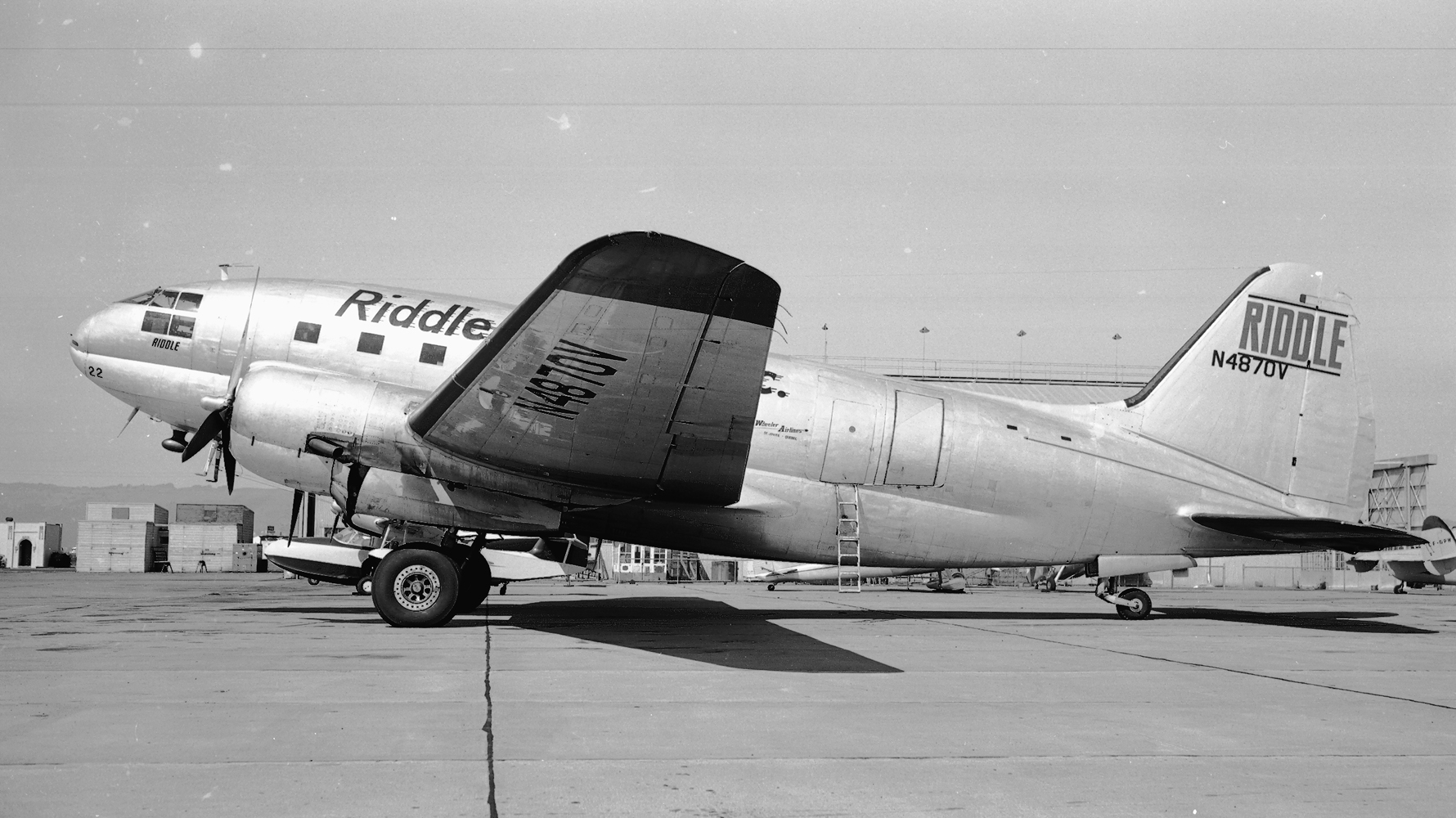
C-46 at Oakland 1955

Airlift International (originally Riddle Aviation Company, then Riddle Airlines) was one of the first US cargo airlines, with the same founder, John Paul Riddle, as Embry-Riddle Aeronautical University. In 1951, the Civil Aeronautics Board (CAB), a now-defunct Federal agency that, at the time, tightly regulated almost all US commercial air transport, certificated Riddle as an "all-cargo carrier," a scheduled freight airline, to fly from New York and Miami to Puerto Rico. This later expanded to include north-south routes on the east coast and midwest. Airlift's headquarters were at Miami International Airport, Florida.

The airline was generally unprofitable, often substantially so, with brief periods of increased revenue and profitability followed by extended declines and debt restructuring; likewise, the airline notably expanded and contracted its fleet several times. Nonetheless, until the 1970s Airlift played a prominent role. Despite losses, it was the subject of repeated changes of control through the early 1960s, including by Arthur Vining Davis, a powerful business leader of the era. Airlift was the first US all-cargo airline to operate jets and a major military contractor during the Vietnam War. In 1966, Airlift bought Slick Airways, another all-cargo carrier and once the largest US freight airline. The CAB gave Slick's trancontinental freight routes to Airlift. In late 1973 Airlift was briefly the subject of a merger agreement with Flying Tiger Line.

The US deregulated air cargo at the end of 1977. Airlift was much the weakest of the three remaining all-cargo airlines and, shorn of protection, quickly succumbed. In May 1981, Airlift ceased operations for over a year, entering bankruptcy in June. It never exited, but lingered in Chapter 11 for over a decade, operating at a low level with a handful of aircraft, including flying turboprops for casinos and prisons, as well as Douglas DC-8 charters. A 1988 Miami Herald article referred to Airlift as "a near-ghost of airlines past." The company last operated June 1992. In August, Hurricane Andrew destroyed two former Airlift aircraft at Miami International Airport. Airlift was the last of the CAB all-cargo carriers to operate.

== History ==
=== Founder ===
John Paul Riddle (1901–1989) was an aviation pioneer, a barnstormer who founded several pilot instruction schools, one of which became Embry-Riddle Aeronautical University. He also helped create a Brazilian pilot school during World War II which grew into the Escola de Especialistas de Aeronáutica of the Brazilian Air Force, a school for aviation specialists, the largest such military institute in South America.

=== Startup ===
J.P. Riddle incorporated Riddle Aviation Company in Florida on 28 May 1945. The carrier's original primary activity was flying to Brazil in support of Riddle's Brazilian aviation school. By 1946 the airline was flying freight from New York to San Juan via Miami. By 1948 the airline achieved stability transporting needlework. Riddle flew raw materials five days a week in Douglas C-47s from Teterboro Airport to Puerto Rico (where skilled needleworkers were paid 1/5 the New York rate) and brought back finished goods (such as fine gloves). Needlework was over 80% of Riddle's business at this time. The carrier was initially an irregular air carrier, but in 1951 the CAB certificated it as a scheduled freight airline between New York and Miami on the one hand and Puerto Rico on the other. See External links for a picture of a Riddle Aviation Co Curtiss C-46. The CAB approved a name change to Riddle Airlines on 3 December 1952.

=== A decade of ownership and management changes ===
Arthur Vining Davis was a powerful business leader of his time, having built Alcoa and industrialized aluminum in the US. In retirement, he invested heavily in South Florida land and companies. In 1953, investors forced out J. P. Riddle, only for him to regain control in 1954. Shortly thereafter, Davis started buying what became a dominant stake in the airline. In 1955, Riddle won a contract to fly seven C-46s for Logair, an Air Force domestic freight network. Also in 1955, the CAB awarded Riddle some of the north–south domestic cargo routes previously flown by defunct U. S. Airlines, with AAXICO getting the rest. Unfortunately, the new routes, which Riddle launched January 1956, were deeply unprofitable and as Table 1 shows, financial results for 1956–1960 were extremely poor. AAXICO was no more successful, suspending its scheduled routes in 1959. By 1956, Davis owned 38% of Riddle. Davis also had 27% of Mackey Airlines, a small Florida-based international passenger airline, which he put into a trust to satisfy CAB concerns. Davis kept investing in Riddle, including backing new issuances; Riddle went public in July 1956. By 1959, 92-year old Davis owned over 60% of Riddle.

Table 1: Riddle Airlines^{(1)} financial results, 1951–1960(1) Until December 1952, Riddle Aviation Company (2) Nine months ending December
USD 000	1951^{(2)}	1952	1953	1954	1955	1956	1957	1958	1959	1960
Op revenue:										
Scheduled	920	1,594	1,814	2,343	2,376	4,667	6,448	5,188	5,243	4,472
Non-sched		43	186	129	198	235	4,600	4,551	2,268	1,982
Other	16	96	(115)	72	999	923	370	(144)	145	46
Total	937	1,733	1,885	2,544	3,573	5,825	11,420	9,596	7,658	6,504
Operating result	(22)	12	(331)	186	646	(1,226)	(1,883)	(2,374)	(1,533)	(1,826)
Net result	(28)	(2)	(396)	102	530	(1,084)	(1,731)	(3,510)	(1,147)	(2,094)
Op margin (%)	-2.3	0.7	-17.5	7.3	18.1	-21.0	-16.5	-24.7	-20.0	-28.1

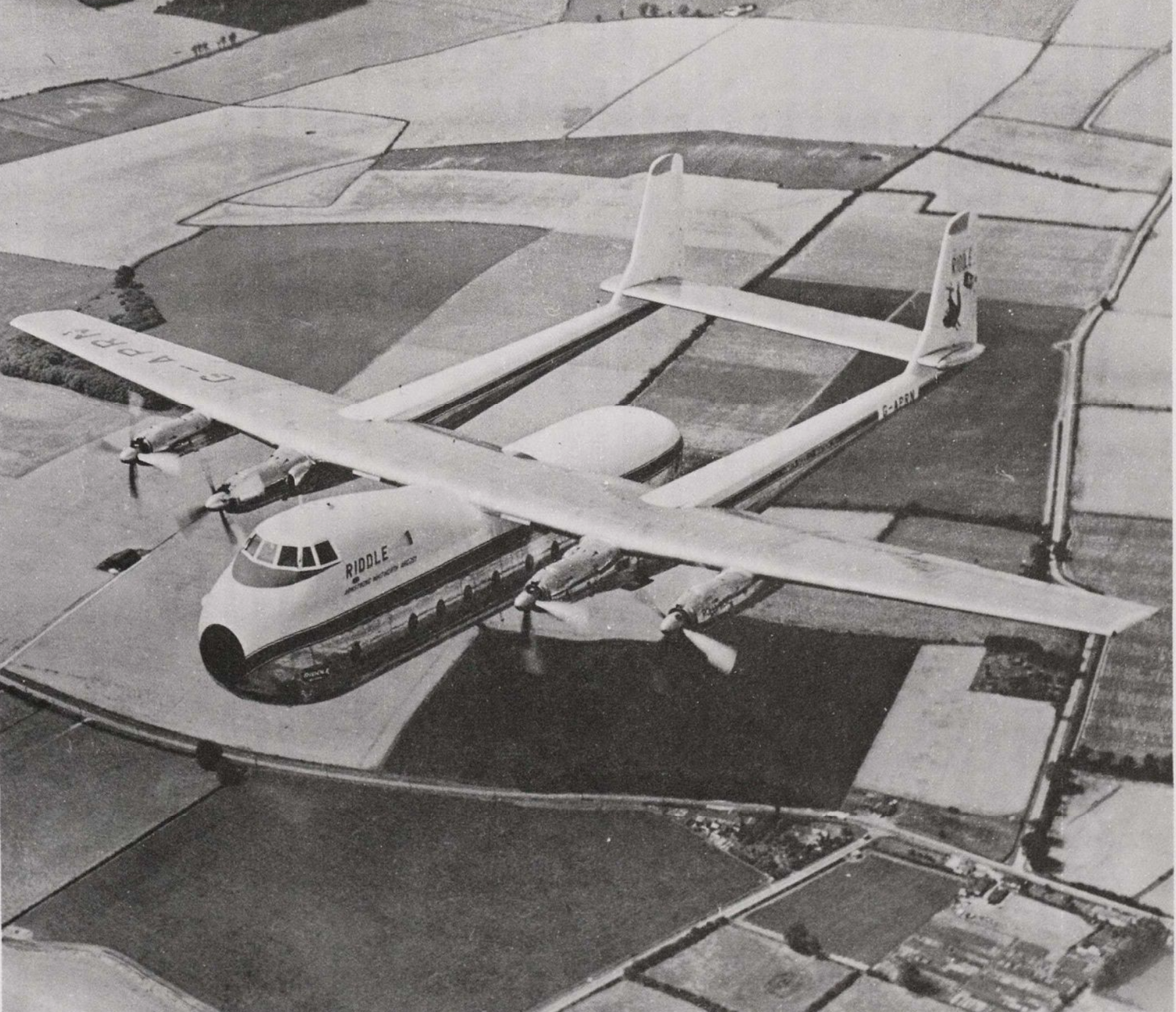
Argosy 1960. Katy the Kangaroo is visible on the tail, but External links has a photo with a better view of the mascot

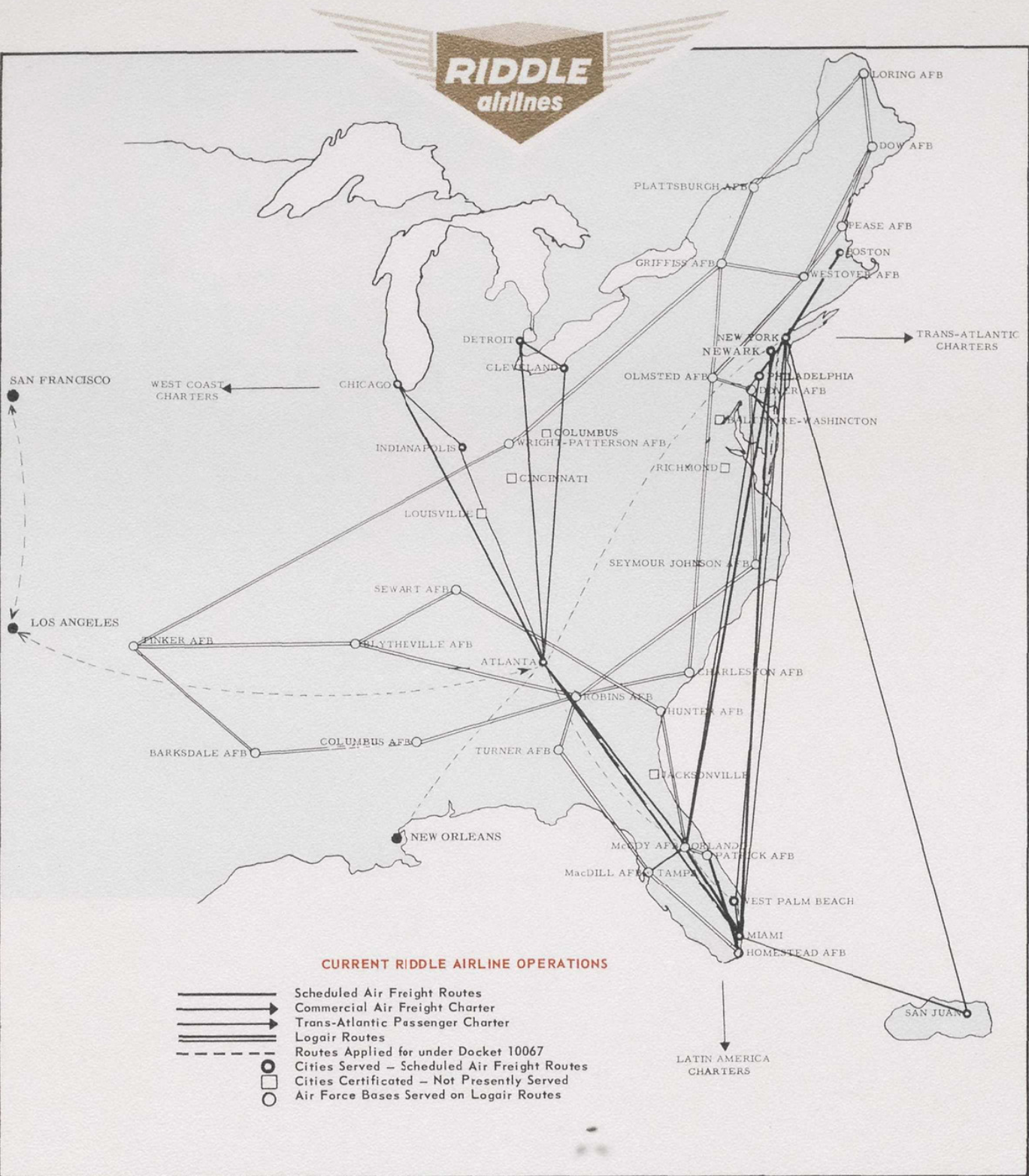
Network June 1960, including Logair

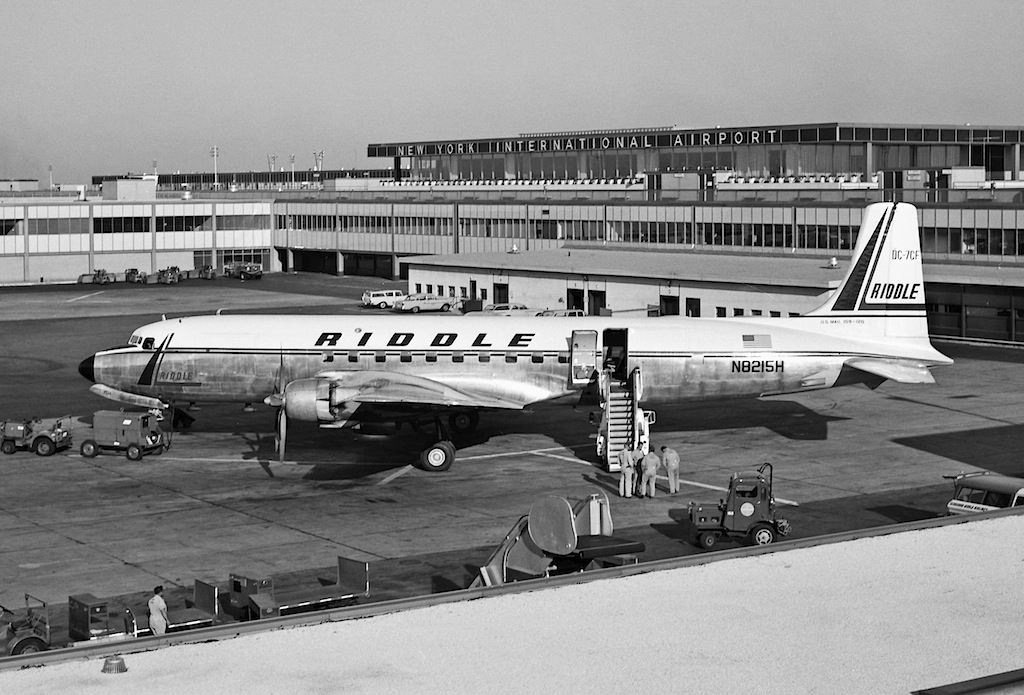
DC-7CF at New York 1962

Davis replaced J.P. Riddle with a new president in 1958, but in 1959 Riddle lost its Logair contract, leading to a 50% reduction in operations. During 1959, Riddle's fleet collapsed from 40 to 14 aircraft. Davis installed another president, Robert M. Hewitt, previously Davis's partner in aircraft leasing. In 1960, Davis sold most of his stake to a Hewitt-led group; Hewitt estimated Davis lost $5 million (over $55 million in 2026 terms) on his Riddle investment. Hewitt expanded into military charters and transatlantic commercial charters with Douglas DC-7s, and won a Logair contract for bulky freight by acquiring the Armstrong Whitworth AW.650 Argosy. Results initially improved, and Riddle became the largest airline military contractor for the year ending June 1962. But Riddle could not operate the Argosy profitably or to the military's satisfaction and returned them in 1962. The next year, the military initially eliminated Riddle as a contractor entirely. Despite being the largest shareholder, Hewitt was forced out in October 1962 in favor of James B. Franklin, a former Capital Airlines executive. A new name, "Airlift International," became effective on CAB approval 16 March 1964.

=== C-46R ===
After World War II, the C-46 was unable to meet standards for passenger aircraft operated by certificated scheduled carriers; it did meet the looser standards for cargo flights and passenger flights on irregular air carriers. In the early 1950s, government standards tightened, forcing modifications so C-46s could meet the higher standards. By 1957, Riddle developed the C-46R, one of three such programs that met the new standards and increased the aircraft's speed, load and safety. Riddle converted at least several dozen aircraft. External links has a photo of the program demonstrator.

=== Katy the Kangaroo ===
Starting in 1958, Riddle's aircraft tails featured a cartoon kangaroo, with a pouch full of boxes and trailing a cylinder labeled "TNT," with a lit fuse (See External links for a photo). TNT stood for the tagline "Tonight Not Tomorrow" referencing the speed of airfreight. The kangaroo's name was Katy and a live kangaroo made publicity appearances. Riddle created My Fair Katy, a musical number based on My Fair Lady. In 1961, Katy made news by escaping her Miami Airport quarters. In 1963 she was handed to a creditor.

=== 1960s bubble: Vietnam, Slick and a diverse fleet ===
In early 1963, Riddle restructured its debt, as part of which Douglas Aircraft agreed to finance two Douglas DC-8 convertible freighters, the first of which delivered that year, making Airlift the first all-cargo carrier to operate a pure jet and qualifying it for military contracts. 1965 was only the second profitable financial year (ending June) in Airlift's two decade history. The scheduled east-coast system still lost money, but increased demand due to an east-coast dock strike, robust military charter business and a five-day-a-week DC-8 charter for Alitalia lifted the company into profit. Military charters surged. Eight months into the government's fiscal 1966 (also year ending June) Airlift's military charter volume to Europe was double the original $6 million commitment, and the military added a further $3 million contract to fly to Vietnam.

Table 2: Airlift International^{(1)} financial results, 1961–1972(1) Until March 1964, Riddle Airlines (2) Year ending June
USD 000	1961	1962	1963	1964	1965	1966	1967	1968	1969^{(2)}	1970^{(2)}	1971^{(2)}	1972^{(2)}
Op revenue:												
Scheduled	4,210	2,091	4,494	5,711	8,294	10,331	10,094	12,142	14,659	14,127	11,013	
Non-sched	19,430	21,717	8,603	9,783	12,854	42,799	56,147	42,794	43,170	38,460	35,054	
Other	66	90	1,341	713	2,056	380	381	1,009	914	1,116	108	
Total	23,706	23,898	14,439	16,208	23,203	53,510	66,623	55,946	58,742	53,703	46,176	47,500
Operating result	853	(235)	(694)	995	3,110	8,502	6,611	(3,264)	(1,879)	(8,615)	(1,731)	2,500
Net result	(133)	(865)	(1,627)	(416)	1,745	5,475	3,676	(4,395)	(5,720)	(13,875)	(14,123)	500
Op margin (%)	3.6	-1.0	-4.8	6.1	13.4	15.9	9.9	-5.8	-3.2	-16.0	-3.7	5.3

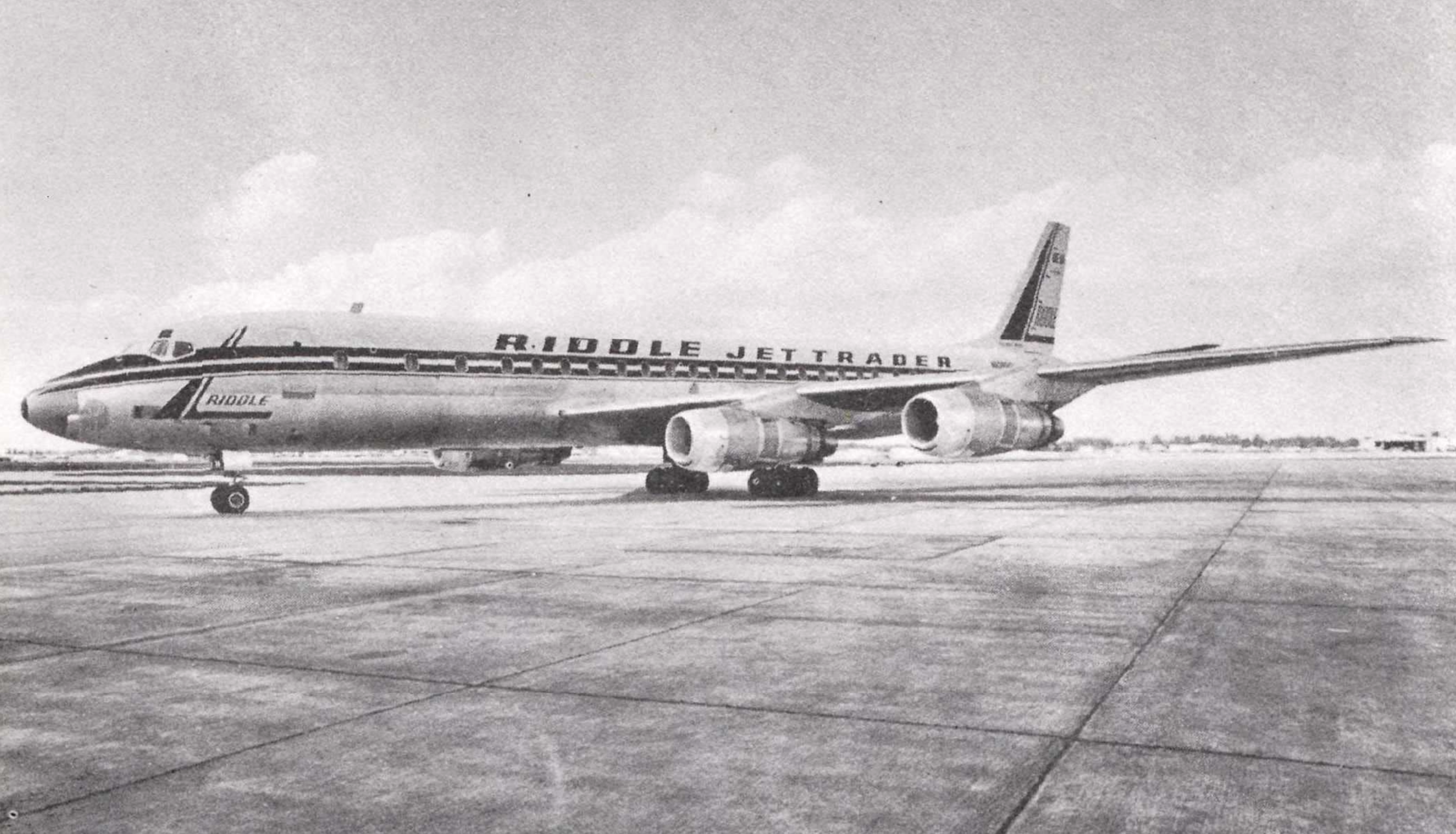
Riddle's first DC-8 1963

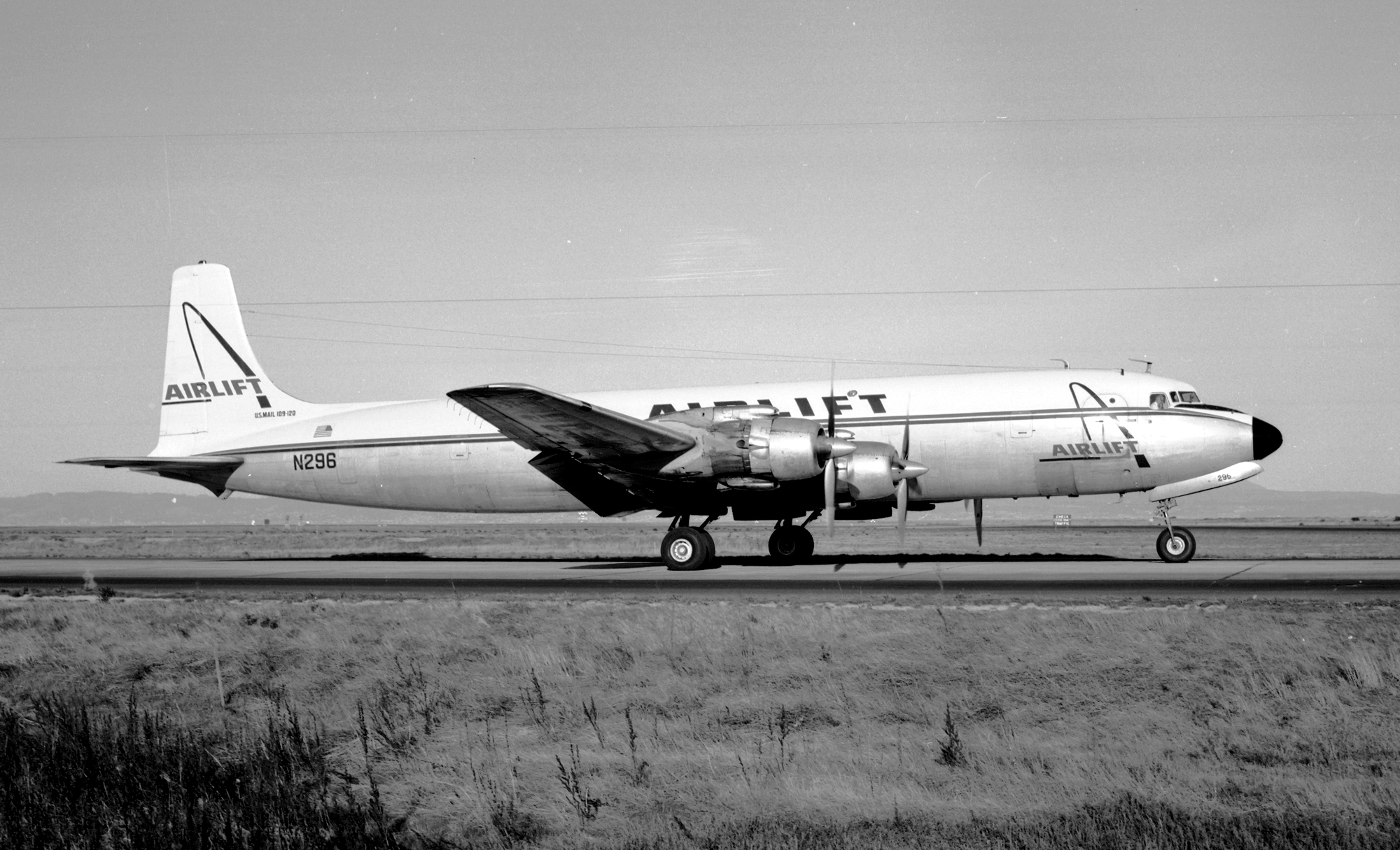
DC-7C at San Francisco 1967

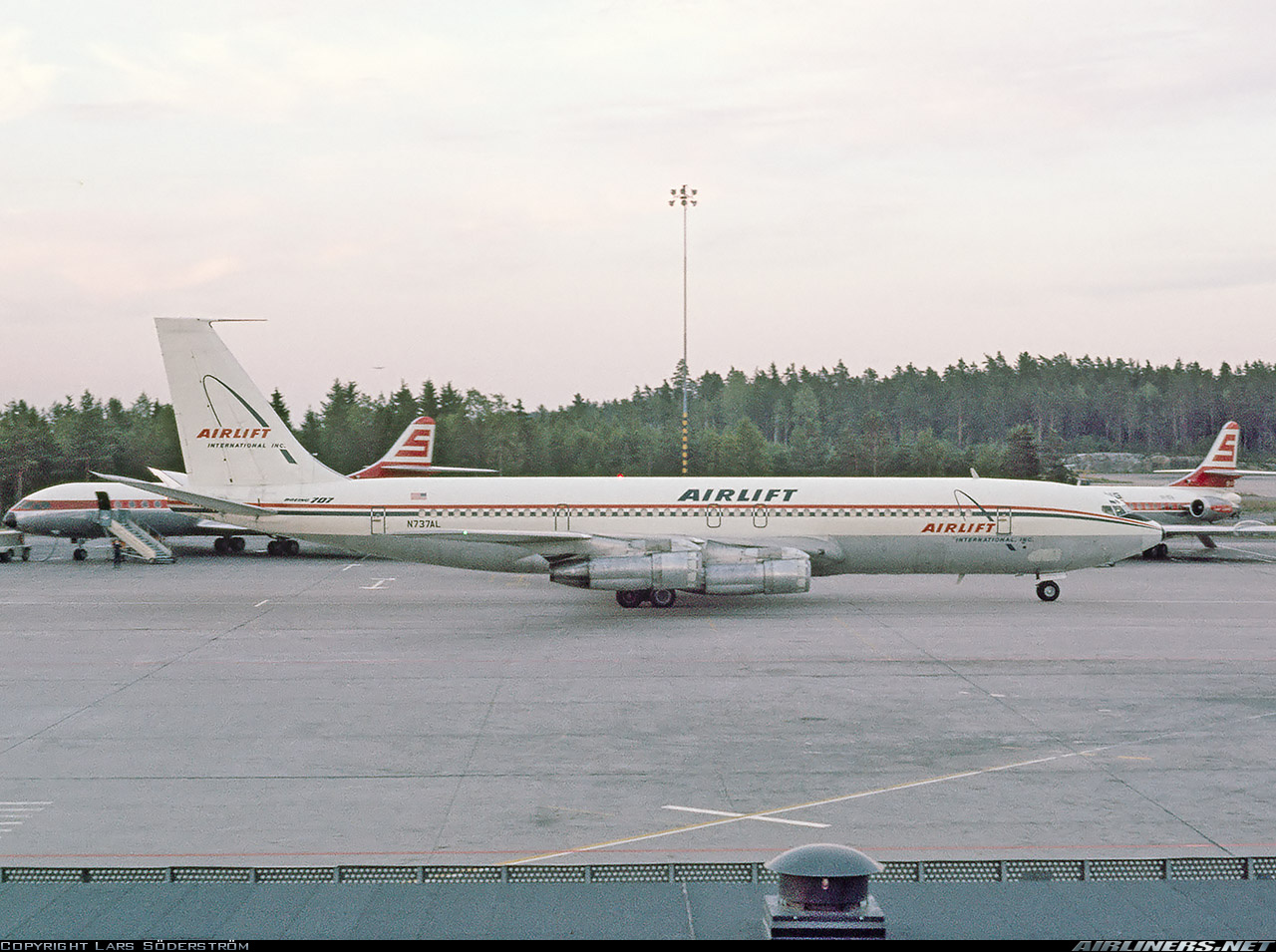
707-320C at Stockholm 1968

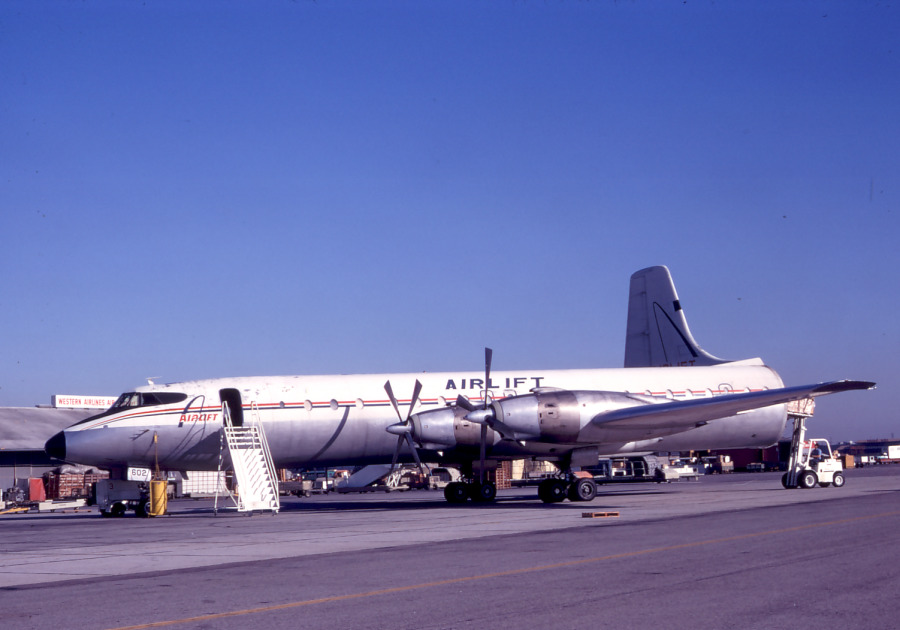
CL-44 LAX August 1969

After World War II, Slick Airways became the largest air freight carrier, certificated in 1949 to fly a scheduled transcontinental route. Like Airlift, Slick found scheduled domestic air freight unprofitable. It suspended scheduled flights in 1958, resumed in 1962 only to stop again in 1965, leaving it with six aircraft flying military charters to Vietnam. This was a problem because the military awarded long-term contracts only to airlines with a meaningful civil business. Airlift acquired Slick on July 1, 1966. In the following 12 months (year ending June 1967) Airlift flew over $52 million (over $500 million dollars in 2026 terms) in military charters, compared to $19 million the prior year. In 1968, the CAB awarded Airlift Slick's former east-west scheduled freight routes, giving Airlift access to the west coast.

Slick's Canadair CL-44 turboprops and Lockheed L-1049H Super Constellations joined Airlift's DC-8s, DC-7s and C-46s. In 1967, Airlift added Boeing 707s, 727s, Lockheed L-100 Hercules and put a deposit on a Boeing 2707 SST; its May 1968 fleet comprised 36 aircraft across eight types (see Fleet). Good times ended abruptly. The need for cargo flights to Vietnam diminished in 1967, and the military first cut back propeller aircraft, including CL-44 turboprops (two of which Airlift was able to shift to flying on behalf of Lebanese carrier Trans Mediterranean). In fiscal year 1968 the military largely ceased chartering propeller aircraft, including the CL-44, which jets rendered uneconomic. Military revenue dropped and Airlift took large writedowns for obsolete aircraft. From financial year 1968 through 1971 Airlift posted $36 million in losses. The fleet shrank to only seven aircraft by December 1971 from 42 at December 1966 (see Fleet). Net losses in financial years 1970 and 1971 were disastrous, as shown in Table 2. The 1971 figures included $3 million in forfeited deposits (over $24 million in 2026 terms) when Airlift failed to finance delivery of three DC-8-63CFs, despite selling its three L-100s (and an associated Logair contract) to Saturn Airways in October 1970 to raise money. An ex-Airlift L-100 crashed, killing its three still-Airlift crew, the day after it was sold. (See Airlift Hercules). World Airways got the foregone DC-8s, (see External links for a photo of one of these failed DC-8 deliveries with World Airways registration and Airlift livery). Airlift recapitalized in October 1972 and at the end of the year Franklin stepped down in favor of Paul J. Finazzo. In October 1973, Flying Tiger tentatively agreed to buy Airlift, but by January 1974, the deal was off, Tiger and Airlift citing the energy crisis as a reason to end it.

=== Deregulation and Latin America ===
Airlift, along with Flying Tiger, World Airways and Trans International, attracted attention by flying DC-8s to Cambodia into the besieged city of Phnom Penh in early 1975. The mid 1970s saw passenger carriers retreat from the domestic cargo business. Western, Continental, Eastern and Delta eliminated all-cargo aircraft service in 1970, 1973, 1973 and 1975 respectively. Passenger carriers increasingly relied on belly space of passenger aircraft to carry freight, nonoptimal because such aircraft fly during the day, not at night. Unfortunately Airlift took a 109 day pilot strike ending early March 1976, and the lack of freighter service by the passenger carriers induced air freight forwarders like Emery and Airborne to charter nascent freight hub-and-spoke systems of their own, limiting Airlift's ability to leverage reduced competition from the passenger carriers. At the end of 1977, the Air Cargo Deregulation Act deregulated the US domestic air cargo market. Airlift was in a self-admittedly weak position entering deregulation compared to the other two remaining all-cargo carriers. And Flying Tiger expanded into Airlift domestic markets in early 1978, putting further pressure on Airlift. But Airlift finally got what it long desired, authority to fly to Latin America.

Table 3: Airlift International financial results, 1973–1981
USD 000	1973	1974	1975	1976	1977	1978	1979	1980	1981
Op revenue:									
Scheduled	16,782	24,450	21,781	24,428	34,936	39,103	20,918	34,455	4,926
Non-sched	20,724	22,441	17,630	12,454	26,069	42,243	32,735	32,972	7,600
Other	394	1,282	1,140	818	1,617	2,953	2,630	2,751	245
Total	37,899	48,174	40,552	37,700	62,623	84,299	56,283	70,178	12,772
Operating result	(3,234)	986	(3,042)	(3,200)	5,495	3,377	6,336	(11,214)	(2,033)
Net result	(2,238)	1,151	(3,011)	(3,427)	6,231	4,523	6,547	(12,314)	(2,455)
Op margin (%)	-8.5	2.0	-7.5	-8.5	8.8	4.0	11.3	-16.0	-15.9

Boeing 727-100C Miami June 1973

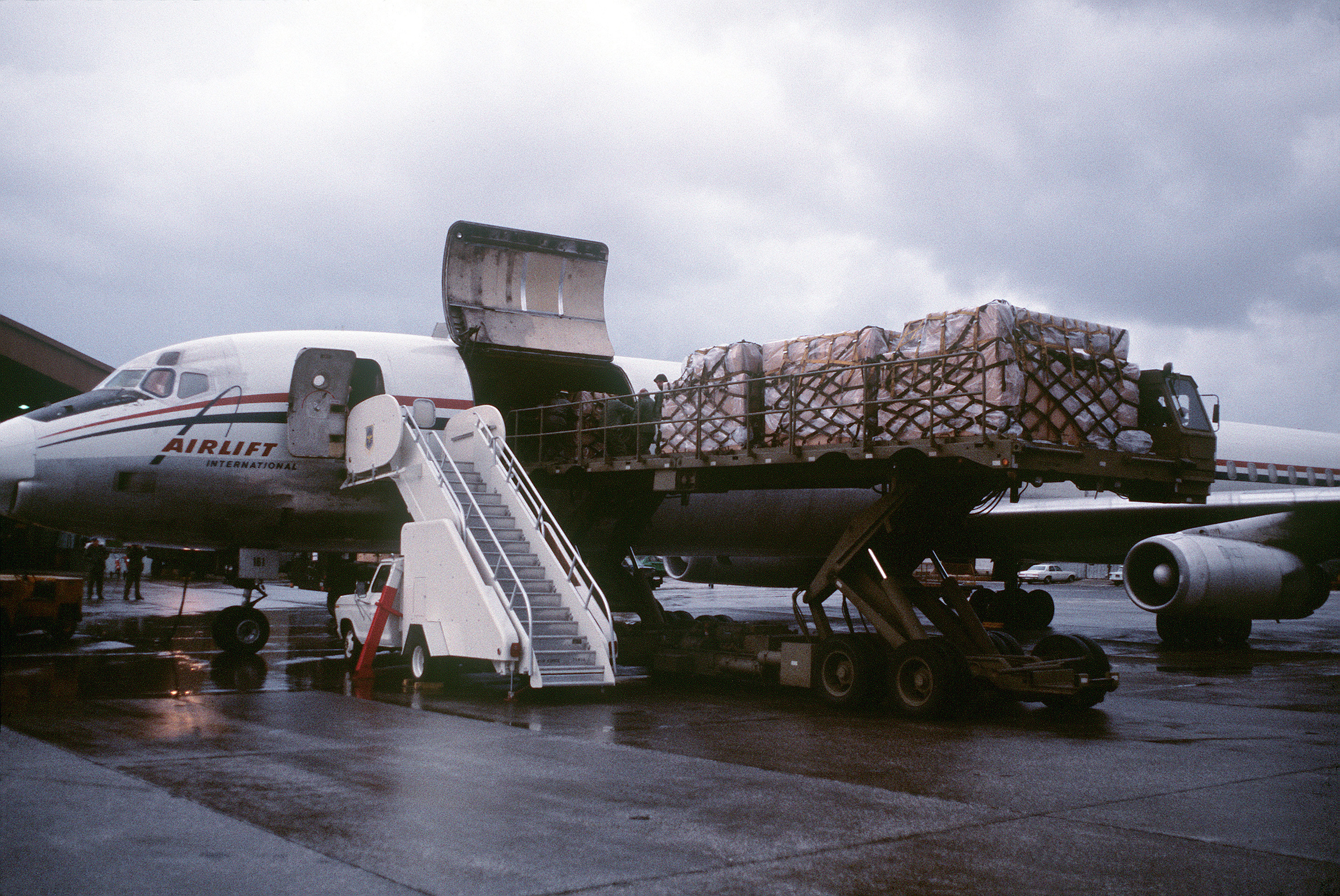
DC-8-63CF at Naples Nov 1980 with relief supplies for 1980 Irpinia earthquake

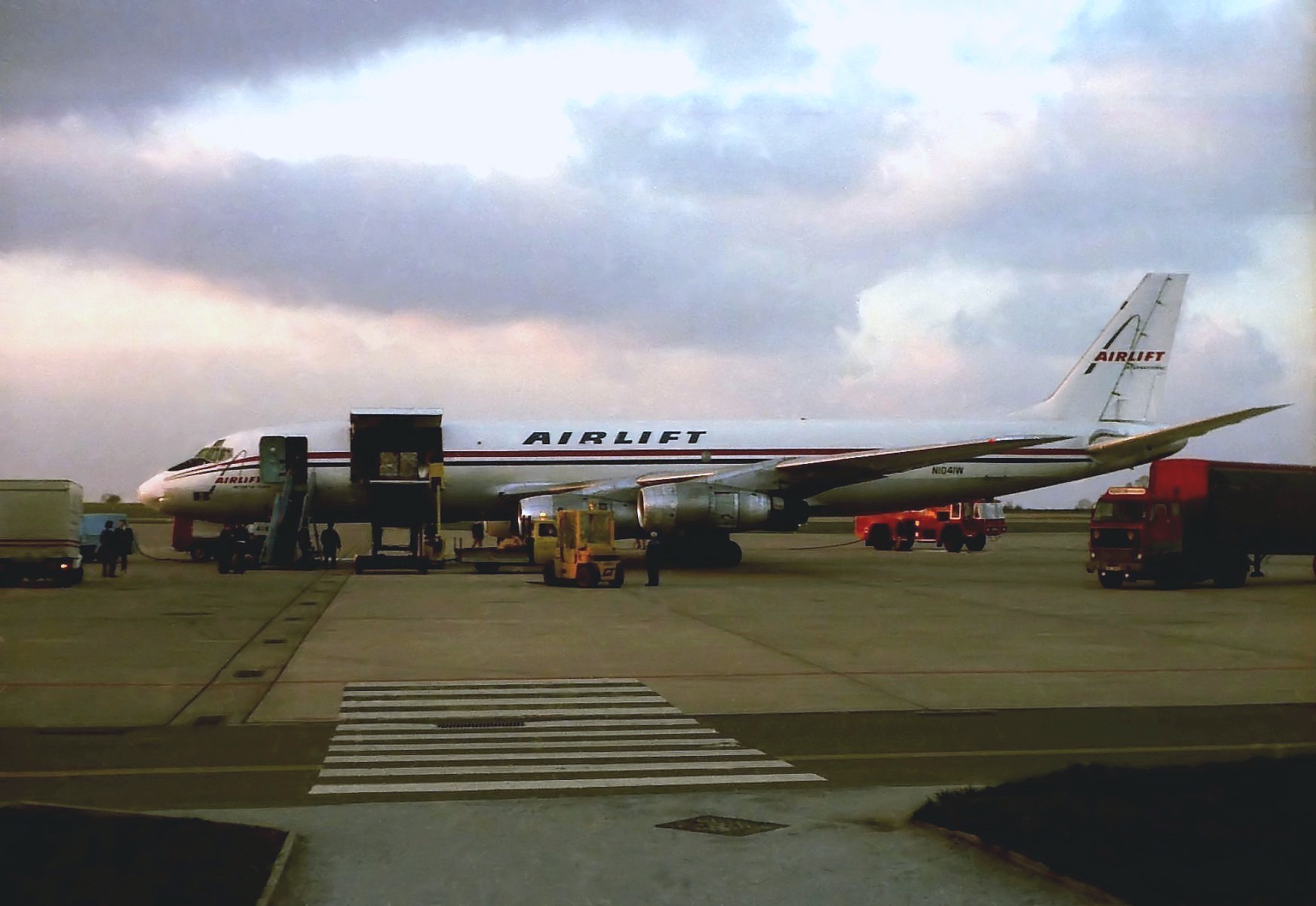
DC-8-54F East Midlands December 1980

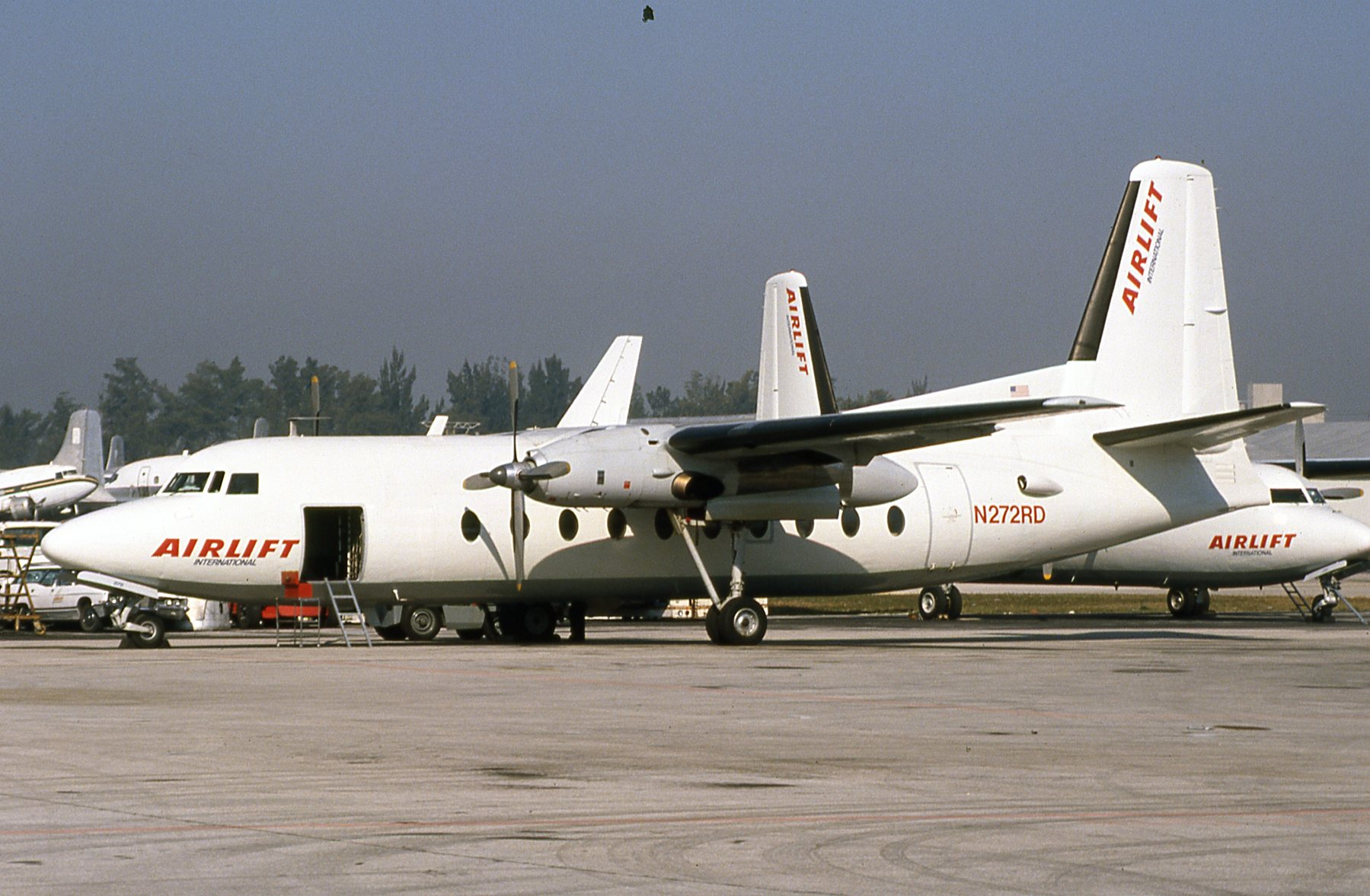
Fairchild F-27 at Miami March 1989

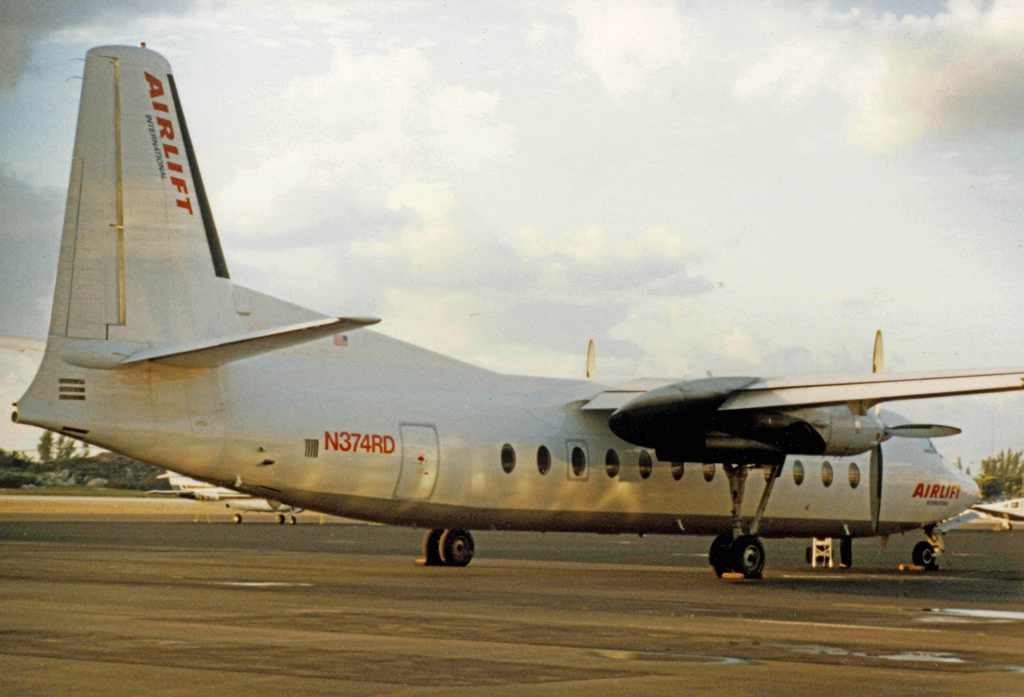
FH-227C in Fort Lauderdale 1989

Riddle first tried to enter Latin America in 1961 by buying Aerovias Sud Americana (dba ASA International), a small Florida-based freight airline certificated to fly to Latin America. Riddle argued ASA (which was in financial trouble) would improve with better aircraft connected to Riddle's domestic system. The CAB turned down Riddle in 1963. Airlift tried again in 1965. In 1968, with ASA moribund since 1965, the CAB refused Airlift (which wanted to use L-100s on ASA routes) a final time (after appeals), saying the ASA network would lose money for Airlift, and distract it from making the former Slick routes a success. Airlift sought Latin American routes again in 1973, but the CAB did not respond. In 1978, the CAB, acting against the advice of its own administrative law judge, finally gave Airlift authority to fly to 12 countries or territories between Argentina and the Dominican Republic. Airlift saw it as the break it was waiting for, but some of the most desirable destinations at the time, such as Venezuela, refused to allow it to enter. But Airlift was unable to handle domestic competition: 1980 was one of the worst financial years in its history. It ended service at 18 domestic cities, reducing the network to New York, Miami, San Juan and five Latin American points.

=== A near-ghost ===
In May 1981 Airlift stopped operating, unable to pay employees or aircraft insurance. It declared bankruptcy in June. Creditors forced appointment of a trustee in November, sidelining Finazzo. In 1982 he was named head of Hawaiian Air Lines. In June 1982, Airlift resumed service in a small way, initially flying military charters with a DC-8. Airlift limped along in Chapter 11, under trustee control, for over 10 years. In the late 1980s it acquired Fairchild F-27/Fairchild-Hiller FH-227 turboprop aircraft, for casino flights to the Bahamas and Atlantic City, and operated a DC-8 under contract to CF Airfreight. The airline filed a plan of reorganization in June 1988, approved by the bankruptcy court in January 1989, but it fell through. A planned 1991 liquidation was averted when an investor group made an offer; that also fell through. In March 1992, over 10 years into what was then South Florida's longest-running bankruptcy, Miami aviation entrepreneur George Batchelor made an offer, further forestalling liquidation; Airlift then had eight employees and a contract to fly prisoners for New York State. But Batchelor pulled out. Federal Aviation Administration (FAA) records show F-27/FH-227 operations as late as June 1992, but none in July. Remaining assets were auctioned in early August. Later that month, two former Airlift Fairchild F-27 aircraft were destroyed by Hurricane Andrew (see Accidents).

Depleted as it was, in 1992 Airlift was the last CAB all-cargo carrier standing. Seaboard World merged into Flying Tiger in 1980, Flying Tiger merged into Federal Express in 1989. Airlift, Seaboard and Flying Tiger were the only remaining CAB cargo carriers in 1978.

== Destinations ==
1951:

- Miami
- San Juan
- New York

September 1966:

- Atlanta
- Boston
- Chicago
- Cleveland
- Detroit
- Indianapolis
- Miami
- New Orleans
- New York
- Orlando
- Philadelphia
- St. Thomas
- San Juan

== Fleet ==
September 1946:

- 7 Douglas C-47

January 1952:

- 4 Curtiss C-46

May 1953:

- 12 Curtiss C-46

April 1958:

- 33 Curtiss C-46
- 4 Douglas DC-4

November 1961:

- 7 Armstrong Whitworth AW.650
- 24 Curtiss C-46
- 3 Douglas DC-4
- 10 Douglas DC-7CF

December 1965:

- 2 Douglas DC-8-54CF
- 14 Douglas DC-7F
- 9 Curtiss C-46

December 1966:

- 2 Douglas DC-8-54CF
- 4 Canadair CL-44*
- 7 Lockheed L-1049H*
- 23 Douglas DC-7F
- 6 Curtiss C-46

(*) Still listed by the FAA as under Slick, despite June 1966 merger of Slick into Airlift

As of May 1968, Airlift operated:

- 3 Boeing 707-320C
- 2 Boeing 727-100QC
- 2 Douglas DC-8-54F
- 4 Canadair CL-44
- 4 Lockheed L-100 Hercules
- 5 Douglas DC-7B
- 11 Douglas DC-7C
- 5 Curtiss C-46

December 1971:

- 4 DC-8
- 3 727

World Airline Fleets 1979 (copyright 1979) shows Airlift with:

- 3 Douglas DC-8-32/33F
- 2 Douglas DC-8-54F
- 3 Douglas DC-8-63CF
- 1 Boeing 727-100C

1987–88 World Airline Fleets (copyright 1987) shows Airlift with:

- 1 Fairchild Hiller FH-227C
- 1 Douglas DC-8-54F
- 2 Douglas DC-8-61

The 1989 edition of JP airline fleets shows Airlift with:

- 6 Fairchild Hiller FH-227C/Fairchild F-27
- 1 Douglas DC-8-54F

=== Airlift Hercules ===
Of four L-100 Hercules delivered to Airlift in 1967 (Construction Numbers 4221, 4222, 4225, 4229, registrations N9248R, N9245R, N759AL, N760AL respectively), three had fatal crashes within five years:

- N760AL C/N 4229 crashed in Alaska December 1968 while in Airlift service operating on behalf of Interior Airways (see Accidents below)
- N9248R C/N 4221 crashed in New Jersey October 1970, the day after Airlift sold its L-100 fleet to Saturn, still operated by Airlift crew.
- N759AL C/N 4225, reregistered to N14ST, crashed in Illinois May 1972 in Saturn service from metal fatigue.

== Accidents ==
- 17 December 1955: A Riddle C-46F disintegrated in flight over South Carolina with the loss of both pilots, the only people on board. The cause was traced to nonconforming elevator parts installed as part of conversion performed overseas by a contractor which created its own parts, which had left the aircraft ineligible for an airworthiness certificate.
- 20 December 1957: A Riddle C-46R on departure from Miami suffered a hydraulic line rupture with subsequent fire in the right engine. The aircraft safely returned to Miami but was extensively damaged due to failure of the emergency fuel shutoff system, insufficient fire barriers and an inoperable fire bottle. The aircraft had been rebuilt from the wreckage of an earlier accident (with another operator) that killed 26 people in 1951.
- 30 March 1959: A Riddle C-46R suffered an intense inflight fire, over Georgia, with the subsequent crash fatal to both pilots on board, the only occupants. The probable cause was ignition of cargo in the aft belly compartment from an unguarded lightbulb.
- 12 September 1966: Airlift International Flight 184/12, DC-7C N2282 from Tachikawa Air Base to Wake Island failed to rotate on takeoff due to improper loading of freight, overran the runway and was destroyed, crew survived.
- 30 December 1966: DC-7C N4059K gear collapsed on takeoff from Saigon to the Philippines, leading to the destruction of the aircraft. Crew survived.
- 22 June 1967: Lockheed L-1049H Super Constellation N6936C was on approach to Saigon when it collided with a USAF F-4. F-4 pilots safely ejected, but the Constellation was destroyed along with four crew and three passengers.
- 24 December 1968: Lockheed L-100-10 Hercules N760AL on approach to Brit-Puk No. 1, a landing strip for an oil drilling site near Prudhoe Bay, Alaska, failed to go around despite poor visibility and crashed. The aircraft was on wet-lease to Interior Airways of Alaska, but operated by Airlift. Two of three Airlift flight crew killed. The loadmaster, an Interior employee, survived. Aviation Safety Network and NTSB incorrectly identify this as an aircraft operated by Interior, but contemporaneous reporting is very clear.
- 23 March 1974: DC-8-63CF N6164A undergoing maintenance at Travis Air Force Base exploded when fumes in a fuel tank ignited, killing a maintenance worker. The aircraft was destroyed.
- 24 August 1992: After Airlift ceased operations, Fairchild F-27 N273RD and Fairchild F-27M N276RD were written-off after damage by Hurricane Andrew

== See also ==
- List of defunct airlines of the United States
- Slick Airways
- Flying Tiger Lines
- Arthur Vining Davis
- John Paul Riddle
