= John Paul Riddle =

American aviator (1901–1989)

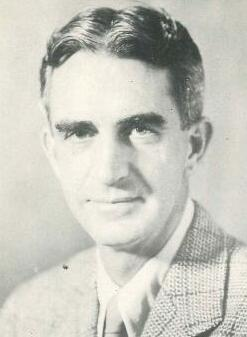
- Born: John Paul Riddle; May 19, 1901; Pikeville, Kentucky
- Died: April 6, 1989 (aged 87)
- Occupations: Pilot; Educator; Airline executive
- Known for: Barnstorming; Training of military pilots in World War II; Embry-Riddle Aeronautical University; Escola de Especialistas de Aeronáutica; Airlift International

John Paul Riddle (May 19, 1901 – April 6, 1989) was an American pilot and aviation pioneer, best known for training Allied air crews in WW2 and co-founding what later became Embry-Riddle Aeronautical University (ERAU). In Brazil, Riddle was instrumental in establishing a large aviation school for the Brazilian Air Force, today known as the Escola de Especialistas de Aeronáutica. He also founded an airline, initially known as Riddle Airlines, but later as Airlift International, which was one of the first scheduled air freight airlines in the United States.

== Personal life ==
Born on May 19, 1901 in Pikeville, Kentucky. After graduating from Pikeville College, he entered the Naval Academy, but left after a year because he wanted to fly airplanes, which he learned to do with the US Army Air Service in Texas after first learning to overhaul plane engines, allowing him to fulfill his boyhood dream of becoming a barnstormer, flying cross country giving rides to people at fairs, having girls write messages on the wings of his Jenny, the aircraft he loved best.

As a young man Paul Riddle was married to and divorced from an opera singer named Grace Chatfield, from nearby Dunleary, Kentucky. In 1948 he married Adele Goeser, who at the time had four children. They had two more children and were divorced in 1969, but ended up as friends living in the same house in Coral Gables, Florida where aged 87 Riddle came down with an illness and died in his sleep a few days later, April 6, 1989. His ashes were scattered over the Atlantic. Riddle is remembered by a marker at Oak Ridge Cemetery in Arcadia, Florida, surrounded by the honored graves of RAF cadets who died learning to fly.

== Embry-Riddle ==
On December 17, 1925, exactly 22 years after the Wright Brothers' first flight, Riddle and T. Higbee Embry formed the Embry-Riddle Company at Lunken Airport in Cincinnati, Ohio. Riddle had met Embry two years prior, while Riddle was barnstorming in Ohio. He had landed at a polo field, offered Embry a ride in his plane, and from then on they were good friends. Riddle was named general manager, and the two began to sell Waco Aircraft in Cincinnati. In spring of 1926, the Embry-Riddle Company opened the Embry-Riddle Flying School. The school grew rapidly in 1928 and 1929, until the Embry-Riddle Company (now the Embry-Riddle Aviation Corporation) was merged with the Aviation Corporation (AVCO) of Delaware. AVCO phased out the Embry-Riddle Flying School in the fall of 1930. Shortly after, AVCO became American Airways (the predecessor of American Airlines), and the Embry-Riddle Company was gone.

In 1939, Riddle was ready to get back into the business of training pilots. He contacted Embry, who had no interest in reentering a partnership with Riddle. Riddle, now living in Miami, Florida, found a partner in John G. McKay and his wife, Isabel. Keeping the Embry-Riddle name, they reestablished the Embry-Riddle School of Aviation (now the Embry-Riddle Aeronautical University), partnering with the University of Miami to provide flight training under the Civilian Pilot Training Program, increasing the number of pilots immediately preceding World War II. Riddle and McKay also formed the Riddle Aeronautical Institute at Carlstrom Field in Arcadia, Florida on March 22, 1941, for the purpose of training pilots for the United States Army Air Corps. A separate division of Embry-Riddle provided technical training in maintenance and metal work.

McKay purchased Riddle's share of Embry-Riddle in 1944 and from then on the two co-founders of the original Embry-Riddle were no longer involved.

== Brazilian Air Force School for Aeronautics Specialists ==
Riddle helped establish an aviation school in Brazil in 1943, then known as the Escola Técnica de Aviação. This is now the Escola de Especialistas de Aeronáutica of the Brazilian Air Force, the largest military education system in South America, focused on the aviation education of Brazilian Air Force personnel.

== Riddle Airlines/Airlift International ==
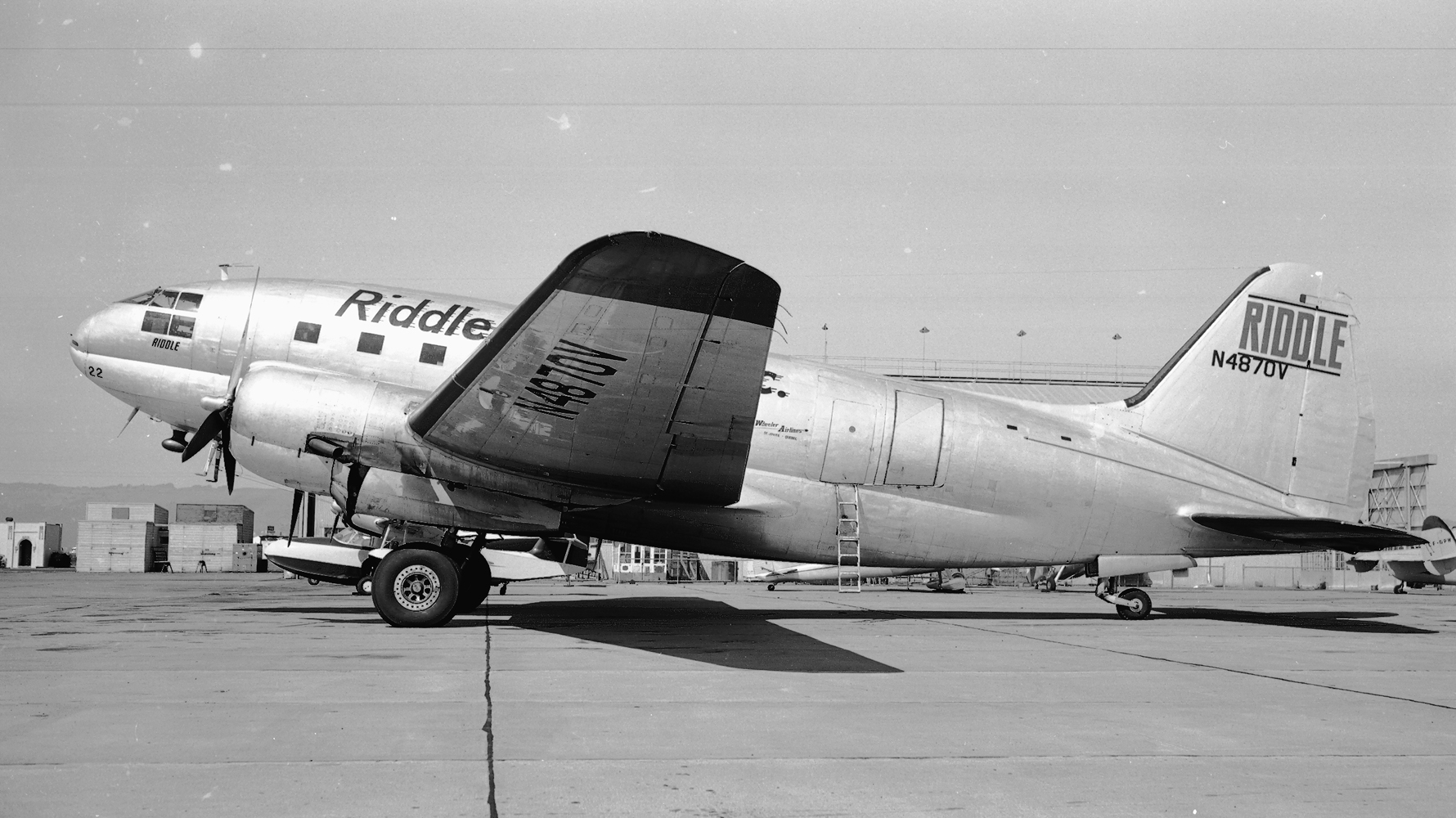
Riddle C-46 at Oakland 1955

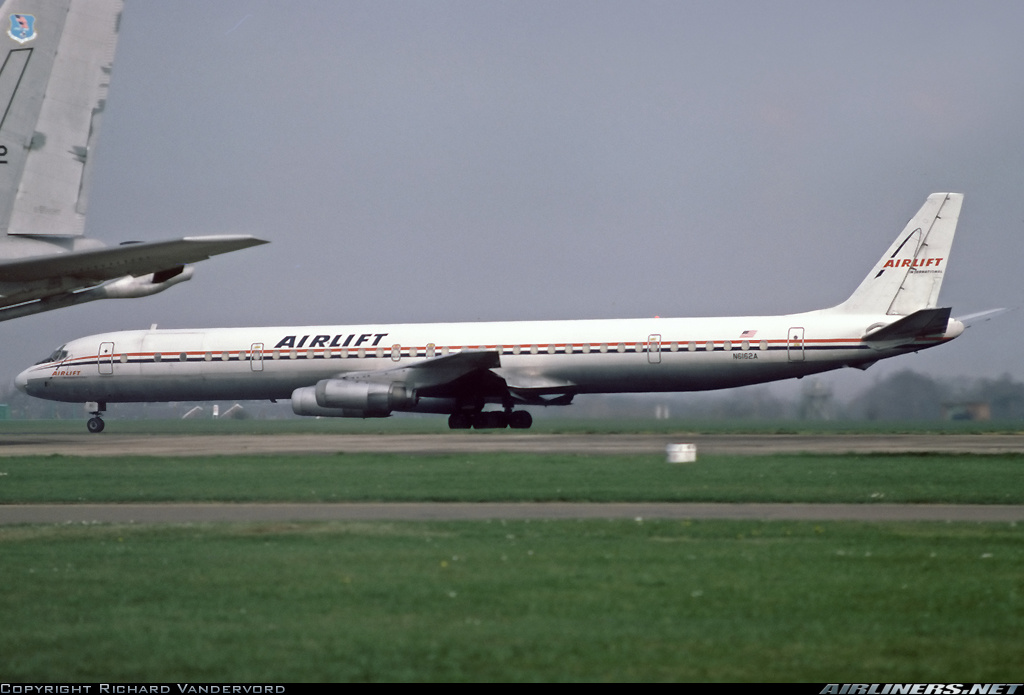
Airlift DC-8-63CF at Mildenhall, UK, 1976

Riddle established Riddle Aviation Company in May 1945, the initial primary purpose of which was to fly between the US and Brazil in support of Riddle's education work for the Brazilian government (see above). In 1951, the Civil Aeronautics Board certificated Riddle Aviation to become one of the US's first scheduled freight airlines. In 1952, Riddle Aviation became Riddle Airlines. J.P. Riddle lost control of the carrier in 1953, but regained it in 1954. However, a powerful businessman of the era, Arthur Vining Davis, bought control of Riddle Airlines and in 1958 replaced J.P. Riddle with new management. The airline once had a live kangaroo as a mascot, Katy the Kangaroo. A cartoon version was painted on aircraft tails.

The airline was renamed to Airlift International in 1964, and in 1966, acquired Slick Airways, another scheduled freight airline that was once the largest freight airline in the US. Airlift at its height operated over 40 freighter aircraft, with fleet types such as Lockheed L-100 Hercules, Canadair CL-44s, Douglas DC-8s, Boeing 707s and Boeing 727s.

The United States deregulated air cargo in 1977. Airlift was an early victim, entering bankruptcy in 1981, from which it never emerged, operating at low intensity until its 1992 demise.

== Other companies ==
The J.P. Riddle Company was a school founded in 1939. The flying and technical school was so large that it contracted five flying schools to the US and British governments.

== Use of Riddle's name ==
- The call sign for aircraft at both ERAU campuses use the phrase "Riddle" followed by the numbers (two at the Prescott campus) in its registration. The call sign is recognized by the Federal Aviation Administration and is usable in the entire National Airspace System.
- The John Paul Riddle Society is a gift society at Embry-Riddle reserved for those who have donated more than $500,000 to the university.
- Before its current name, Airglades Airport in Clewiston, Florida was known as Riddle Field.

== Awards ==
- Wesley L. McDonald Elder Statesman Award (1986)
- Pikeville College Outstanding Alumni Award (1988)
- Florida Aviation Hall of Fame

== See also ==
- Embry-Riddle Aeronautical University
