= T. Higbee Embry =

American businessman (1897–1946)

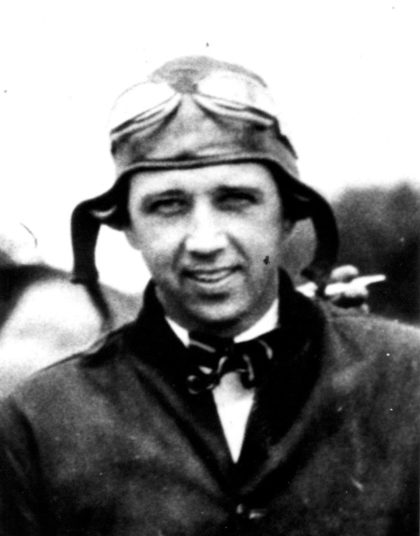
- Born: Talton Higbee Embry; May 17, 1897; Cincinnati, Ohio, U.S.
- Died: 1946 (aged 48–49)
- Education: Asheville School
- Occupation: Businessman
- Known for: Founding Embry–Riddle Aeronautical University

Talton Higbee Embry (May 17, 1897 – 1946) was an American aviation enthusiast who co-founded the company leading to Embry-Riddle Aeronautical University.

== Early life and family ==
Embry was born in Cincinnati, Ohio where he started his education. He attended Asheville School in Asheville, North Carolina. While Embry was trying to start a bus company in Cincinnati he met early aviator John Paul Riddle, who had landed at the local polo field. Riddle offered him a plane ride, and from then on Embry was hooked on aviation. After parting ways with Riddle in 1939, he moved to California in 1941. Five years later, in 1946, Embry died of a heart attack.

He married Mary Elizabeth Bennett in June 1919.

== Career ==
Two years after meeting, T. Higbee Embry and friend, John Paul Riddle, formed the Embry-Riddle Company on December 17, 1925 at Lunken Airport in Cincinnati, Ohio. The company was financed by Embry and he served as company president, and the two began to sell Waco Aircraft. In the spring of 1926, the Embry-Riddle Company opened the Embry-Riddle Flying School.

The Embry-Riddle Company was merged with the Aviation Corporation (AVCO) of Delaware in 1929. AVCO phased out the Embry-Riddle Flying School in the fall of 1930. Shortly after, AVCO became American Airways (the predecessor of American Airlines), and the Embry-Riddle Company was gone.
