= John P. Johnson (academic administrator) =

American academic

5th President of Embry-Riddle Aeronautical University
- In office November 2005 – May 2015

John P. Johnson is an American academic who became the fifth president of Embry-Riddle Aeronautical University in 2006. He formerly served as interim president since 2005 and served as Provost and Chief Academic Officer since 2003. He retired from Embry-Riddle on May 31, 2015 and was named President Emeritus by the Board of Trustees.

Johnson held the position of Provost and Chief Academic Officer at Texas A&M University-Texarkana (1999-2003). He served as the Dean of the College of Health Professions at the Medical University of South Carolina (1991-1998) and as the Dean of the College of Professional Studies at Northern Kentucky University (1987-1991). He served as the Chairman of the Department of Communication Disorders at Lamar University (1983-1987).

Johnson received his Bachelor of Arts Degree (1967) and Master of Science Degree (1969), both from Florida State University, before completing his Doctor of Philosophy Degree (1975) from Kent State University. Concurrent with his university administration appointments, Johnson held faculty appointments in Speech Pathology and Audiology, Physical Medicine and Rehabilitation, Otolaryngology and Communicative Sciences, and Biology.

== Industry and community service ==
- In 2014, Johnson received the Daytona Regional Chamber of Commerce’s Enterprise Award on behalf of the University for Generous Community Service, and a substantial impact on the overall economic vitality of the Daytona Beach area.
- Johnson received the 2013 Herbert M. Davidson Memorial Award for Outstanding Community Service from the Community Foundation of Volusia & Flagler, a division of the United Way of Volusia-Flagler Counties.
- In 2008-2009 he was the Honorary National Chairman of the Silver Wings Society.

== Honors and recognition ==
- Johnson received the 2010 John K. Lauber Award for Aviation Safety from the University Aviation Association, honoring the University's record of safe flying and operations as part of the safety-culture initiative he established.
- For his leadership in aerospace education and research, he received the 2007 Jimmy Doolittle Fellowship Award from the U.S. Air Force Association.
