= WIKD-LP =

- Daytona Beach, Florida; United States
- Frequency: 102.5 MHz
- Branding: The WIKD 102.5 FM

Programming
- Format: Free-Format

Ownership
- Owner: Embry-Riddle Aeronautical University

History
- First air date: February 15, 2005
- Former call signs: WERU
- Call sign meaning: Wicked

Technical information
- Licensing authority: FCC
- Facility ID: 133962
- Class: L1
- ERP: 94 watts
- HAAT: 31 meters
- Transmitter coordinates: 29°11′33.00″N 81°2′50.00″W

Links
- Public license information: LMS
- Webcast: Listen live (via iHeartRadio)
- Website: Official Website

WIKD-LP (102.5 FM) is the radio station of Embry-Riddle Aeronautical University in Daytona Beach, Florida. The station broadcasts in the Daytona Beach area as a LPFM, covering about a 5- to 7-mile radius from the transmitter site, with a coverage of roughly 120,000 people depending on time of year not including online streaming. The station is non-profit, entirely student run, and does not have a fixed format, however focuses on Top 40, indie, alternative rock, and EDM.

WIKD is currently operated as a division of the Embry-Riddle Student Government Association by a nine-member Operations Board.

== History ==
The history of student radio at Embry-Riddle dates back to the 1970s and WSST-FM, which morphed into WERU-AM in 1977. WERU-AM was dissolved in 1982. A subsequent broadcasting club charted with the Student Activities department dissolved in 1988 without establishing a student-run radio station. WSST and WERU were both low-power stations that were not able to be received off campus.

WIKD began as "The Broadcast Club" in the Spring semester of 1990, initially chartered by then-freshman Steve Graff. The first few meetings brought high turnout (ca. 75 students), but did not immediately lead to much progress. The club gained momentum after Graff met Todd Gumbrecht, another freshman resident of the same dormitory (Doolittle Hall, then known as Dorm I) as Graff. The two developed a publicity-heavy strategy in order to meet their goal of establishing a campus radio station.

The club became known for its fliers which were posted around campus (often in unapproved locations) to announce club meetings, as this was long before e-mail and text messaging and Facebook and Twitter. The fliers were influenced by the DIY ethic of punk rock, surrealism, 1950s' clip art, science fiction, and "golden age" of radio. A flier typically consisted of cut-and-pasted and otherwise altered photographs from magazines, and their distinct style and provocative nature made them stand out from other notices on campus.

The initial club logo was a stylized radio tower resembling the tower symbol from an FAA sectional chart, with the letters "WERU" drawn in a 1920s' art deco type script. The radioactivity symbol became another popular club logo later, appearing on buttons, T-shirts, and stickers. With the preponderance of fliers, T-shirts, buttons, and stickers, some students believed there actually already was an operating station on campus. The "WERU" station ID was not an FCC-assigned station ID, and was chosen purely because of the ease of recognition within the University community.

The club decided to pursue the goal of carrier current broadcasting, and in the Fall of 1991, Graff and Gumbrecht travelled to NYC to attend a convention of carrier current college stations hosted by equipment manufacturer LPB. At this meeting, the pair obtained a copy of the UConn station bylaws, which became the model for the broadcast club/WERU organization.

Also in 1991, Gumbrecht became the Student Government Association (SGA) representative for students living in campus housing. In addition to being a passionate advocate for dorm residents, Gumbrecht used this platform to further the argument for the station, and to find allies within the Student Government Association. Also, in 1991, the club organization began to bloom, with Carrie Czernikowski as the treasurer, author of the training manual, and eventual training director.

Initially there was antipathy from the dean of students, the Student Activities office, and the SGA toward the club and its goal of establishing a radio station. This was due to the failure and dissolution of a previous iteration of the broadcast club, involving theft of equipment. The mischievous and defiant impression that the club gave off at times may not have helped with this matter. However, the growing popularity of the movement among students, and the dedication of members eventually overcame the aversion, and by 1992, "Campus Radio" became a campaign issue in the SGA presidential race.

While working toward the eventual goal of a campus radio station, the club engaged in fundraising, publicity, and charity events, such as providing mobile DJ services for student organizations and Special Olympic events. These activities further increased the club's exposure, and generated funding for a proposed studio and broadcasting infrastructure. In 1993, per student vote, the station was established as a division of the SGA, the first new division in 24 years, with Gumbrecht as the Division Head.

The first WERU studio was in a closet shared by the university cafeteria vendor, Morrison's. At this point, the station broadcast via AM carrier current on 710AM. Eventually, the station moved operations to a closet in the McKay Hall dormitory with a small mixing board and two CD players. WERU later moved into a Student Government Association (SGA) office in the Student Center (currently room UC-111). With upgraded facilities, and by this time a full-fledged division of the SGA, WERU was initially broadcasting on 104.7 MHz through radiating cable FM on campus. After many years of trials and tribulations from previous Chairmen, WERU 104.7 FM had finally applied for a LPFM FCC license in 2002 thanks to SGA President, Peter Alverez, and WERU Chairman, Patrick "Nacho" Mudge. Shortly after application, "Nacho" left ERAU to be soon followed by Chairman Greg Huston, who continued to pursue the station's LPFM license.

By the Fall 2004 semester Division Chairpersons Jesse Lesperance and David Yarwood had successfully completed the LPFM construction permit application. On Tuesday, February 15th, 2005, at 12:00pm, WERU completed its first broadcast on 99.1 FM. WIKD then applied and was approved for their current call letters as WIKD-LP.

On Christmas Day 2006, an F2 tornado struck the Embry-Riddle Daytona Beach Campus, which caused millions of dollars in damages, subsequently damaging the radio station studio. Through the valiant work of many, WIKD was quickly back up and running, and within 2 months was back to a high broadcasting standard.

During the Winter break of 2011-2012 a team of WIKD members got to work to give the radio station a much needed makeover, both aesthetically, and technically. The implementation of a brand new Nautel VS300 transmitter with dynamic RDS capability was followed by a brand new climate controlled 10x12' transmission shed. The studio itself was made state of the art with complete Cat6 wiring and StudioHub+ implementation. Furthermore, new doors, ceiling tiles, paint job, desk carpet were installed. 6 fiber optic lines were run to form the internal network (WIKDNET) so that FTP and streaming services could be improved. Major strides in programming rotation were made to suit the new studio changes which include a CHR style rotation schedule. DJs continue to bring free-format variety to the station through their shows.

In April 2012 the WIKD crew applied for a frequency change from 99.1 MHz to 102.5 MHz. In doing so WIKD-LP effectively became a 24/7 FM station rather than the previous half-day timeshare station. In switching to 102.5 MHz WIKD also waived the large amounts of interference that were being received on 99.1 from a larger power FM station in Jacksonville, Florida. This new station was branded as The WIKD 102.5 FM and Eagles FM was dropped completely as a name.

In August 2013, WIKD become the 23rd college radio station be to be broadcast and streamed on Clear Channel's iHeart Radio service.

WIKD continuously strives to provide radio entertainment in Daytona Beach, broadcasting through a fully digital capable studio, providing the only free-format radio option in Daytona Beach.

WIKD also provides a DJ service to members of the ERAU community, and the Daytona Beach Area called WIKD Entertainment. WIKD Entertainment offers professional entertainment services at reasonable prices, available for parties, weddings, various on-campus events, and other private events. All on-campus events for student clubs and organizations are provided free of charge.

Since moving into ERAU's new Student Union building in 2018, WIKD has adopted new divisions in podcasting and productions. The station provides their recording studio for free to any students wanting to make a podcast or music.

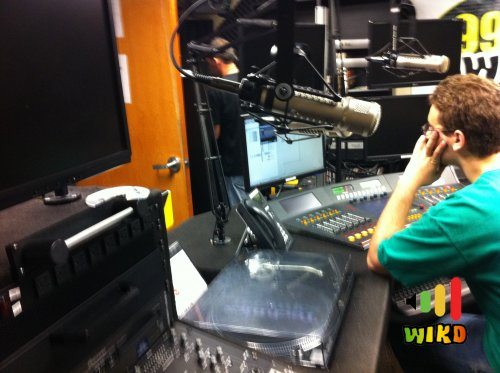
The former WIKD Studio in UC-111 A

== See also ==
- College radio
- Indie radio
- List of college radio stations in the United States
