= Arthur Vining Davis =

American industrialist and philanthropist (1867–1962)

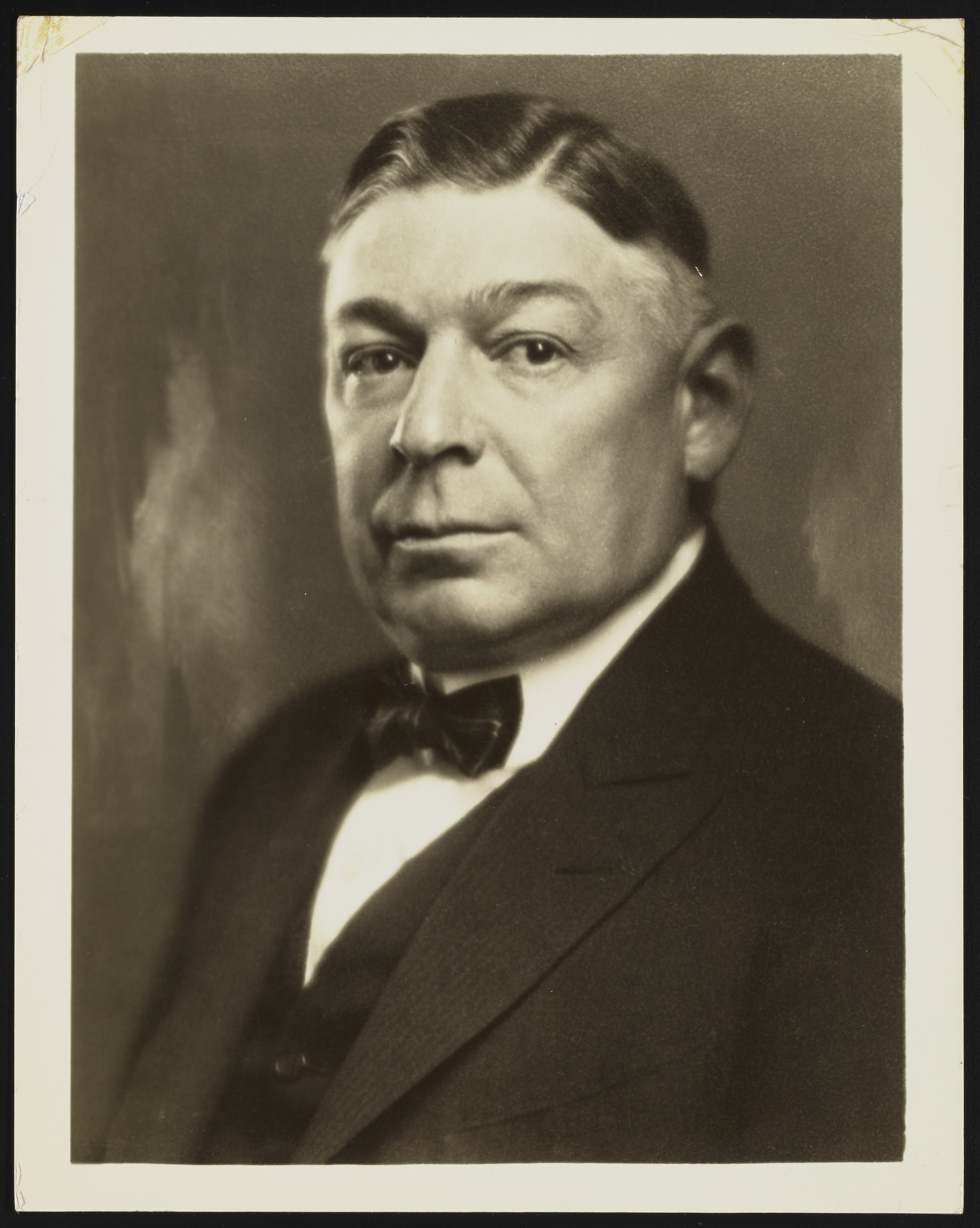
- Born: May 30, 1867; Sharon, Massachusetts, U.S.
- Died: November 17, 1962 (aged 95); Miami, Florida, U.S.
- Resting place: Locust Valley Cemetery, Locust Valley, New York, U.S.
- Occupation: Industrialist
- Known for: Philanthropy
- Spouses: Florence Holmes; Elizabeth Hawkins Weiman

Arthur Vining Davis (May 30, 1867 – November 17, 1962) was an American industrialist and philanthropist, for many years president, chairman and largest stockholder of the aluminum producer Alcoa.

== Early history and education ==
Arthur Vining Davis was born in Sharon, Massachusetts, the son of Perley B. Davis, a Congregational minister, and Mary Frances. After attending school in Hyde Park, Massachusetts, and the Roxbury Latin School in Boston, Davis entered Amherst College, graduating in 1888 seven years before his friend Calvin Coolidge.

== Early career ==
As a result of his father's friendship with a former parishioner, Alfred E. Hunt, founder of the Pittsburgh Reduction Company that made aluminum, Davis obtained a job with that company. Although aluminum's favorable characteristics as an industrial metal had been known for several decades, it was expensive to manufacture; Hunt's company hoped to capitalize on Charles Martin Hall's experiments to produce the metal at low cost via electrolysis.

The work required a handyman's disposition—overalls and a twelve-hour day—as the manufacturing process was a continuous one. Davis and Hall became close associates during the experimental phase, and on Thanksgiving Day of 1888, they poured the first commercial aluminum.

== Alcoa ==
Davis soon became general manager of the firm and a director in 1892. He continued as general manager when the firm became the Aluminum Company of America (Alcoa) in 1907; he became president in 1910 and chairman of the board in 1928, in which capacity he served until 1958. Although by this time aluminum was more widely known, it was by no means a household word. Davis' major responsibility was to promote the manufacturing and selling of quality aluminum products: Alcoa's Wear-Ever line of cookware was sold by college students recruited each spring; Alcoa made aluminum wire as an electrical conductor when copper-wire producers refused to do so; and aluminum horseshoes, bicycles, covers for bottles, canteens, and ships, and the Wright brothers' airplane engine were evidence of the metal's versatility.

But these years were also highlighted by confrontations with the government over antitrust issues. In 1912, the Justice Department charged Alcoa with three counts of violation of the antitrust laws; within a few weeks, the company signed a consent decree. In 1922, the company underwent investigation by the Federal Trade Commission, but the case was dismissed in 1930. In 1937 the Justice Department began an extensive antitrust case against Alcoa. This one was conspicuous for its duration and for Davis' extraordinary performance on the witness stand. Davis was the star witness, testifying for six weeks and contributing over 2,000 pages of testimony. In dismissing the petition of the Justice Department, the trial judge praised Davis, who also drew accolades from his Alcoa colleagues for having personally won the company's case.

Awarded the Presidential Certificate of Merit for ensuring that the government had adequate supplies of aluminum in World War II, Davis built Alcoa into an industrial giant. He also amassed great wealth as the company's largest stockholder, thereby provoking continued personal confrontation with Washington. At the time of his retirement from Alcoa in 1957, he was listed as the third-richest individual in the world.

Because Davis cherished privacy, his personal success was not accompanied by much exposure to the media about his business or private life. He did not usually fare well in interviews. "I've had to work hard all my life," he asserted to a reporter. "I've had to work sixteen hours a day to make a good living. Do you work sixteen hours a day?" Time magazine referred to Davis as a "terrible-tempered tycoon...ruling [Alcoa] with desk-thumping autocracy," a view that was not atypical in the press at large.

== Investments and philanthropies ==
Before retiring from Alcoa, Davis began a second career by investing primarily in the Bahamas and Florida.

The investments included extensive real estate holdings in the Miami area (estimated at one-eighth of Dade County; see also Arvida Corp.) and on Cuba's Isle of Pines (he was said to own one-quarter of the island before his property there was nationalized by the government of Fidel Castro when it came to power), as well as ownership or control of some thirty Florida enterprises ranging from dairy farms to resort hotels. In 1959, Davis purchased "half of Longboat Key, a good part of Lido Key and all of Bird, Otter and Coon Keys," all islands on the west coast of Florida. The rapid acquisition and size of the investments resulted in considerable publicity and additional controversy with the government, this time with the Securities and Exchange Commission.

Davis bought 5,000 acres of land in Eleuthera in 1939 and 30,000 more acres after the war. He invested in farming and in a canning factory and introduced associated infrastructure. Davis sold most of his holdings to the government in 1950 for a resort venture; when the venture failed, Davis repurchased most of his former holdings for less money.

== Personal life ==
Davis married Florence Isabel Holmes, of Indiana, on October 23, 1894, in Allegheny Co, PA. She died on May 3, 1909, in Pittsburgh, PA. In March 1912, he married Elizabeth Hawkins Weiman, who died in 1933. He had no children.

== Death and legacy ==
In 1962 Davis died in Miami, leaving a $400-million estate. Only a small portion of his wealth went to individuals. The majority went to a trust he had established in 1952 and to Arvida (from ARthur VIning DAvis), a northern Quebec model town he had founded in 1927 for working families. The Arthur Vining Davis Foundations provide financial assistance to educational, religious, cultural, and scientific institutions, and are regular PBS donors.

== Resources ==
- "Arthur Vining Davis". Dictionary of American Biography, Supplement 7: 1961–1965. American Council of Learned Societies, 1981.
- * McGoun, William E., Southeast Florida Pioneers: The Palm and Treasure Coasts, 1998, Sarasota: Pineapple Press, Chapter 27. Compares the lives of Arthur Vining Davis and John D. MacArthur, another heavy investor in Florida real estate.
