= Harry Clever Field =

- IATA: PHD; ICAO: KPHD; FAA LID: PHD

Summary
- Airport type: Public
- Owner: City of New Philadelphia
- Serves: New Philadelphia, Ohio
- Time zone: UTC−05:00 (-5)
  - Summer (DST): UTC−04:00 (-4)
- Elevation AMSL: 894 ft (272 m)
- Coordinates: 40°28′13″N 081°25′12″W

Map
- Location within Ohio Location within the United States

Runways
Direction	Length		Surface
Direction	ft	m	Surface
12/30	1,907	581	Turf
15/33	3,951	1,204	Asphalt

Statistics (2023)
- Aircraft operations (year ending 9/26/2023): 21,350
- Based aircraft: 40
- Source: Federal Aviation Administration

Harry Clever Field (IATA: PHD, ICAO: KPHD, FAA LID: PHD) is a public airport in New Philadelphia, Ohio. The National Plan of Integrated Airport Systems for 2018 categorized it as a general aviation facility.

The airport hosts a number of events, such as bush plane fly-ins and pancake breakfasts. Events often include old warbirds and vintage aircraft.

The airport is home to a chapter of the experimental aircraft association.

== History ==
Tuscarawas County Aviation was established on 26 January 1929 to build Schoenbrunn Air Field. An airway sign directing pilots to the airport was painted on the roof of a local factory building in August of that year.

Construction of an 8,600-square-foot (800 m^{2}) brick hangar began in early July 1936. Just before World War II, future astronaut John Glenn learned to fly at the airport.

By November 1948, the airport had grown to over 97 acres (39 ha). A new 4,000-foot (1,200 m) runway was dedicated on 23 July 1950. By June 1956 it was known as the Dover-New Philadelphia Airport. Lake Central Airlines began offering flights from the airport using DC-3s in late March 1953. The service continued until 1961. Before the year was out, the city had offered the New Philadelphia Municipal Airport to the county and authorized leasing part of it to a charter service called Flytwin. Midwest Airways began offering service to the airport in early October 1964.

By late January 1967, paving of taxiways was underway. In January 1968, the airport received a $50,000 grant from the state to repave the runway. The paving was completed in mid April, with the only work remaining being painting the runway markings. After city council rejected a suggestion a few days later to institute landing fees, Tuscarawas Aviation, the airport leaseholder, announced plans to sell stock. The majority of shares were purchased by Jack and Harold Miller, who took over operation of the airport less than a week later. Following a proposal by a former mayor the year before, the airport was renamed Harry Clever Field in honor of its founder on 7 June 1969. It received another $50,000 grant from the state in early August 1970 to build taxiways. That November, four pilot-controlled strobe and twelve threshold lights were installed at the airport.

A Michigan-based company, GAM Corporation, took over operation of the airport in 1973. Perkins was given a lease in early April 1974 to build a new airport restaurant.

In 2015, the airport received funds to update its master plan and replace its wind cone. The master plan update allowed the airport to reclassify its runway and develop a new airport layout.

In 2020, a mural dedicated to John Glenn was painted at the airport.

== Facilities ==
Harry Clever Field covers 65 acres (26 ha) at an elevation of 894 feet (272 m). It has two runways: 15/33 is 3,951 by 100 feet (1,204 x 30 m) asphalt; 12/30 is 1,907 by 70 feet (581 x 21 m) turf.

The airport has a fixed-base operator that sells fuel and offers services such as general maintenance and rental cars as well as amenities such as conference rooms, vending machines, pilot supplies, conference rooms, and more.

In the year ending September 26, 2023, the airport had 21,350 aircraft operations, average 58 per day: 95% general aviation, 4% air taxi, and <1% military. 40 aircraft were then based at the airport: 38 single-engine and 2 multi-engine airplanes.

The airport is adjacent to the Evergreen Burial Park.

== Accidents and incidents ==
- On June 14, 2008, a Mooney M20K was damaged during a gear-up landing at Harry Clever Field. The pilot thought he had lowered the landing gear at the final approach fix, but "did not check it down and locked." The pilot heard the audible gear warning say "check gear" as he was reaching to increase the throttle for a go-around. The pilot was reaching for the landing gear handle as the airplane settled onto the runway. The probable cause of the accident was found to be the pilot's failure to extend the landing gear prior to landing.
- On August 9, 2009, a Cessna TR182 impacted a deer during landing at the Harry Clever Field airport. He heard a loud thump and his passenger saw the impact.
- On June 25, 2011, a Piper PA-28-140 airplane was substantially damaged during a runway excursion while landing at Harry Clever Field Airport. The pilot reported that, before entering the traffic pattern, the airport's windsock appeared to be "limp/down" and that he decided land on runway 14. While on final approach, the pilot encountered a strong wind gust that resulted in the airplane touching down past the touchdown zone. He noted that the airplane was too far down the runway to safely abort the landing, so he elected to steer the airplane into a field located off the right side of the runway.
- On February 18, 2012, a Cessna 182 sustained substantial damage when the left wheel separated from the left main landing gear during landing roll at the Harry Clever Field Airport. The left wing sustained substantial damage when it struck the ground. The pilot reported that the landing was normal, but during the landing roll as the airplane was turning onto the taxiway, the left wheel separated from the landing gear. The examination of the airplane revealed that the four bolts that attached the wheel to the landing gear were broken. The probable cause of the incident was found to be the inadequate maintenance of the wheel attachment bolts, which resulted in the left wheel separating from the landing gear during landing due to ductile overstress fractures.

== See also ==
- List of airports in Ohio
