= Boone County Airlines =

Airline based in Kentucky, United States

IATA	ICAO	Call sign
-	-	-
- Founded: October 27, 1946; 78 years ago
- Ceased operations: 1950; 75 years ago
- Hubs: Cincinnati/Northern Kentucky International Airport
- Headquarters: Boone County, Kentucky, USA

Boone County Airlines was a passenger airline based in Boone County, Kentucky, near Cincinnati, Ohio, USA. It was the first airline to operate commercial passenger service from the Cincinnati/Northern Kentucky International Airport instead of the Cincinnati Municipal Lunken Airport.

== History ==
The airline was established and started operations in 1946 and was the first airline to offer commercial passenger service from Cincinnati/Northern Kentucky International Airport. The airline operated out of the original wooden terminal built at the airport after the previously military airfield was declared surplus. The planes were crewed by members of the Boone County Aero Club. As well as passenger services, their fleet of three Douglas DC-3s was used for charter trips for businesses such as Procter & Gamble and recreational flights. Boone County Airlines also had pilot training facilities for students, while also selling airplanes and servicing aircraft. By the early 1950s, the Boone County Aero Club was dissolved and the airline had ceased operations.

== Fleet ==
- 3 – Douglas DC-3

== See also ==
- List of defunct airlines of the United States
