= Metal Aircraft Corporation =

- Industry: Aerospace
- Predecessor: Halpin Development Company
- Founded: 1927
- Founder: Thomas E. Halpin
- Defunct: 1929
- Fate: Purchased by Columbus Flying Service
- Headquarters: Cincinnati, Ohio, United States
- Key people: Powel Crosley, Jr.; T. Higby Embry; Ralph Graichen (Chief Engineer); E. F. Lunken

Metal Aircraft Corporation was an American aircraft manufacturer of transport aircraft. The company was a pioneer in all-metal construction at a time when the technology was in its infancy.

== History ==
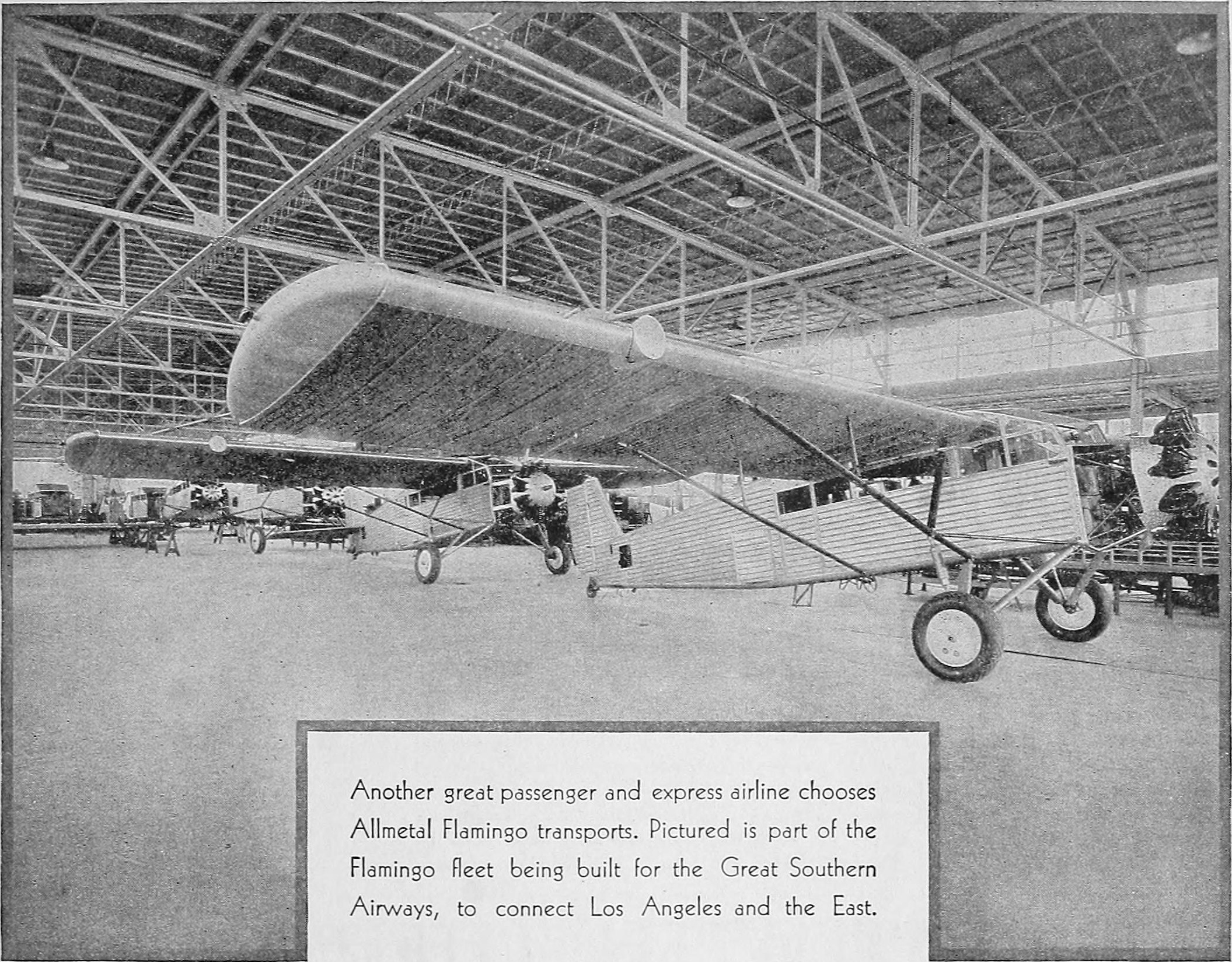
Flamingos under construction at the Metal Aircraft factory at Lunken Airport.

In October 1927, Thomas E. Halpin, the former chief inspector of the Stout Metal Airplane Company, moved to Cincinnati and founded the Halpin Development Corporation to begin work on a new airplane design. He was joined by Ralph R. Graichen, the co-designer of the Ford Trimotor, who became vice-president and chief engineer of the company. By January 1928, construction of the Halpin Flamingo had started. Following the first flight of the airplane at Lunken Airport on 9 April 1928, the company was offered $10,000 if it would remain in Cincinnati. Within two weeks the company was purchased by a group of Cincinnatians and on 2 May 1928 it was reincorporated as the Metal Aircraft Corporation. (Note: This group included Powell Crosley and Julius Fleischmann, Jr.) Production of the Metal Aircraft Flamingo transport was continued at its factory at the Lunken Airport with several variations.

In September 1928, construction on a new factory was started at Lunken Airport. (Note: The factory was built on the west side of Wilmer Avenue. However, due to the road being moved westward in the 1960s, the former site of the factory is now to the east of it.) By May 1929, a monoplane called the "Moonbeam" was built at the company's factory for Powell Crosley. Later, by July 1929, Mason-Dixon Air Lines installed a ticket counter and waiting room in the building.

Following a merger with the Johnson Airplane and Supply Company of Dayton, Ohio and the Kansas City Airport in September 1929, Robert H. Shryver, president of Columbus Flying Service, purchased a controlling interest in the company.

By 1932, the former Metal Aircraft Corporation factory was being used by the Vermilya-Huffman Flying Service and the Jones-Graichen Aircraft Corporation. (Note: The latter was developing a single engine low wing monoplane with the unusual feature of "venturi tubes" located in the landing gear fairings.)

== Aircraft ==
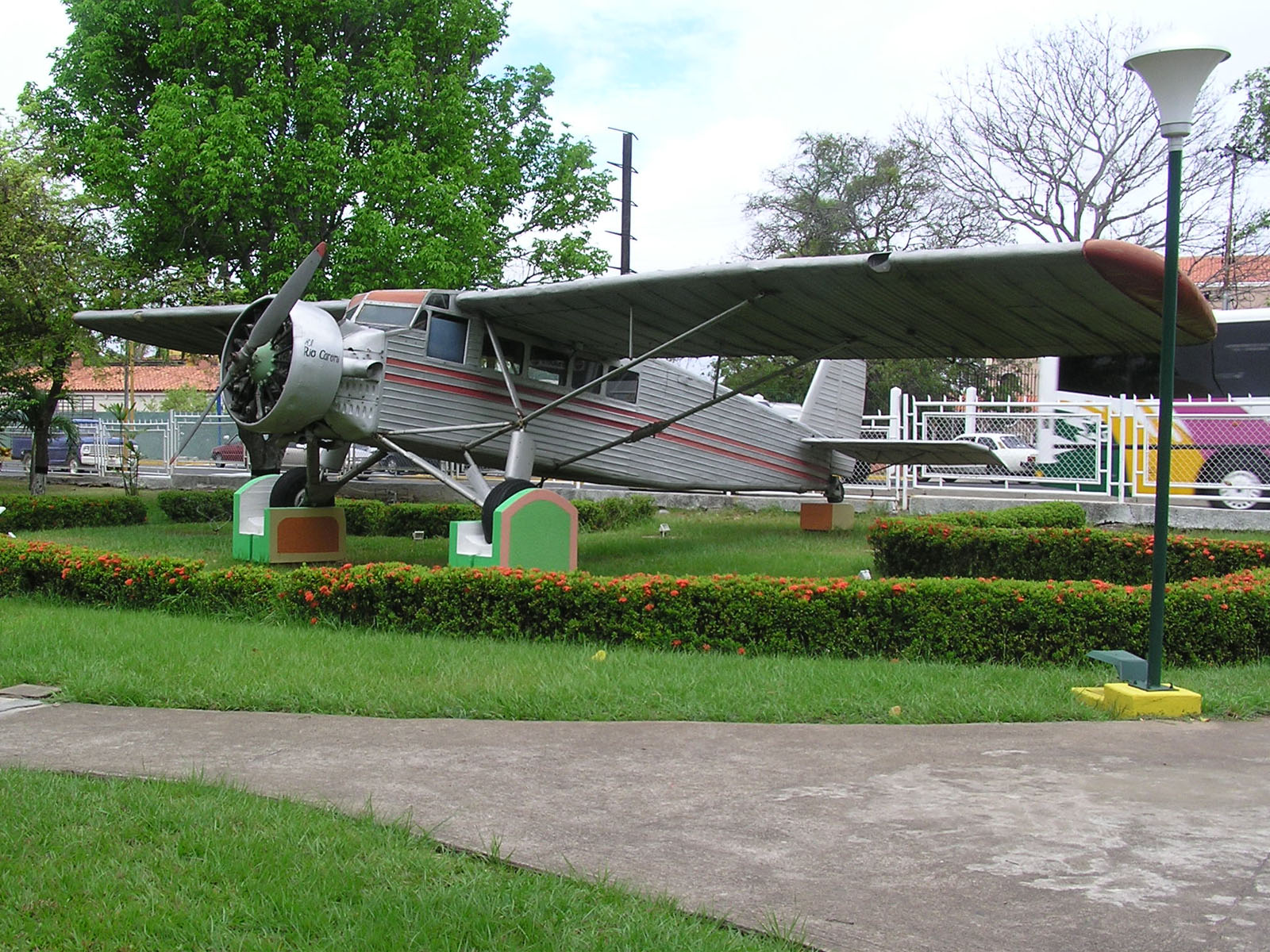
The Metal Aircraft Flamingo El Rio Caroni, which was used by Jimmy Angel to discover Angel Falls

Model name	First flight	Number built	Type
Metal Aircraft G-1 Flamingo	1928	1	Single engine monoplane airliner
Metal Aircraft G-2 Flamingo		21	Single engine monoplane airliner
Metal All-Metal Tranship	1929		Single engine monoplane airliner

== See also ==
- Aeronca Aircraft
- International Aircraft
