= Ohio World War II Army Airfields =

Ohio World War II Army Airfields
- Part of United States Army

Site information
- Type: Army Airfields

Site history
- Built: 1940-1944
- In use: 1940–present

During World War II, the United States Army Air Forces (USAAF) established numerous airfields in Ohio for training pilots and aircrews of USAAF fighters and bombers.

Most of these airfields were under the command of First Air Force or the Army Air Forces Training Command (AAFTC). However the other USAAF support commands (Air Technical Service Command (ATSC); Air Transport Command (ATC)) commanded a significant number of airfields in a support roles.

It is still possible to find remnants of these wartime airfields. Many were converted into municipal airports, some were returned to agriculture and several were retained as United States Air Force installations and were front-line bases during the Cold War. Hundreds of the temporary buildings that were used survive today, and are being used for other purposes.

== Major airfields ==
Army Air Force Training Command

- Bricker APT, Bowling Green

Contract Primary Flying Instruction
Now: Wood County Airport (IATA: 1G0)

- Lockbourne AAB, Columbus

374th Army Air Force Base Unit
Was: Lockbourne Air Force Base (1948-1974)
Was: Rickenbacker Air Force Base (1974-1980)
Now: Rickenbacker Air National Guard Base (1980-Present)
Also: Rickenbacker International Airport (1994-Pres)
(IATA: LCK, ICAO: KLCK, FAA LID: LCK)
Eastern Flight Training Center

Kenton County Airport, Covington, Kentucky
Sub-base of Lockbourne AAB
Now: Cincinnati/Northern Kentucky International Airport
(IATA: CVG, ICAO: KCVG, FAA LID: CVG)

Air Transport Command

- Lunken APT, Cincinnati

Joint use USAAF–Navy–Civil airfield
Now: Cincinnati Municipal Lunken Airport
(IATA: LUK, ICAO: KLUK)

Air Technical Service Command

- Cleveland MAP, Cleveland

Aircraft assembly and modification facilities
Now: Cleveland Hopkins International Airport
(IATA: CLE, ICAO: KCLE, FAA LID: CLE)

- Patterson Field AAF, Fairborn

478th Army Air Force Base Unit
Merged 1948 with Wright Field AAF

- Wright Field, AAF, Dayton

Merged 1948 with Patterson Field
Now: Wright-Patterson Air Force Base (1948-Pres)
- Dayton AAF, Dayton

Sub-base of Wright Field AAF
Joint use USAAF/Navy/Civil Airfield
Now: Dayton International Airport
(IATA: DAY, ICAO: KDAY, FAA LID: DAY)

- Clinton County AAF, Wilmington, Ohio

Sub-base of Wright Field AAF
Glider Training
Was: Clinton County Air Force Base (1947-1972)
Now: Airborne Airpark
(IATA: ILN, ICAO: KILN, FAA LID: ILN)
