= Cincinnati/Northern Kentucky International Airport =

Airport in Boone County, Kentucky, United States

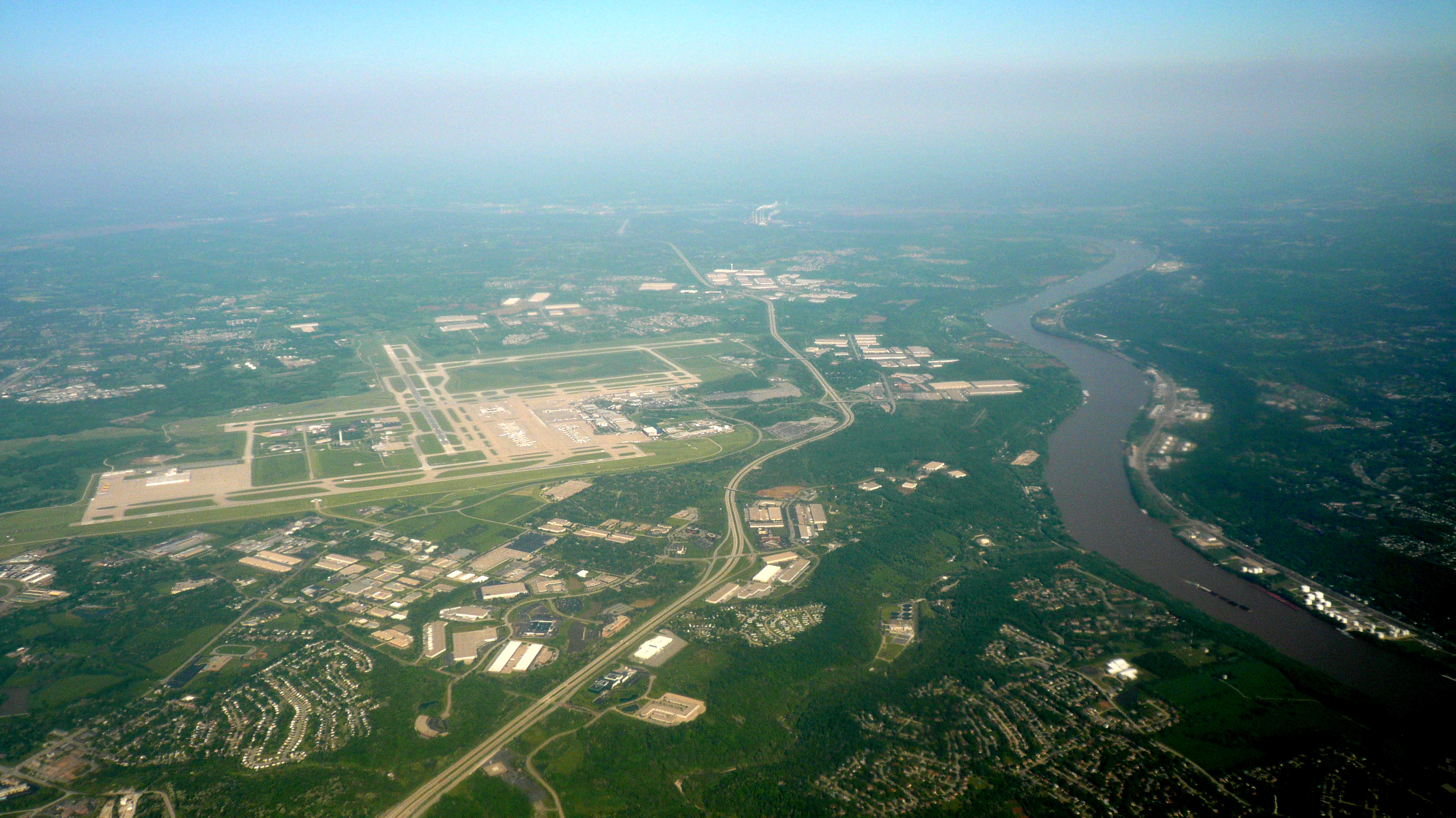
- IATA: CVG; ICAO: KCVG; FAA LID: CVG; WMO: 72421

Summary
- Airport type: Public
- Owner/Operator: Kenton County Airport Board (CVG Airport Authority)
- Serves: Cincinnati metropolitan area
- Location: 2939 Terminal Drive; Boone County, Kentucky, U.S. (Hebron postal address)
- Opened: January 10, 1947; 79 years ago
- Hub for: Amazon Air; Atlas Air; DHL Aviation
- Operating base for: Allegiant Air; Endeavor Air; Frontier Airlines; Sun Country Airlines
- Elevation AMSL: 896 ft (273 m)
- Coordinates: 39°02′56″N 084°40′04″W
- Website: www.cvgairport.com

Maps
- FAA airport diagram
- Interactive map of Cincinnati/Northern Kentucky International Airport

Runways
Direction	Length		Surface
Direction	ft	m	Surface
9/27	12,001	3,658	Asphalt/concrete
18C/36C	11,000	3,353	Asphalt/concrete
18L/36R	10,000	3,048	Concrete
18R/36L	8,000	2,438	Concrete

Statistics (2025)
- Total passengers: 8,971,128 ▼2.62%
- Aircraft operations: 154,373
- Total cargo (tons): 1,703,828
- Source: CVG Airport

Cincinnati/Northern Kentucky International Airport (IATA: CVG, ICAO: KCVG, FAA LID: CVG) is a public international airport located in Boone County, Kentucky, United States, near the community of Hebron. It is the primary commercial airport for Cincinnati, Ohio and the tri-state area. The airport's code, CVG, is derived from the nearest city at the time of the airport's opening, Covington, Kentucky. The airport covers an area of 7,000 acres (10.9 sq mi; 28.3 km^{2}). It is included in the Federal Aviation Administration (FAA) National Plan of Integrated Airport Systems for 2023–2027, in which it is categorized as a medium-hub primary commercial service facility.

Cincinnati/Northern Kentucky International Airport offers nonstop passenger service to over 50 destinations in North America and Europe, handling numerous domestic and international cargo flights every day. The airport is a cargo global hub for Amazon Air, Atlas Air, ABX Air, Kalitta Air, and DHL Aviation. The airport is currently the 5th busiest airport in the United States by cargo traffic and 12th largest in the world. CVG is the fastest-growing cargo airport in North America.

== History ==
=== Beginnings ===
President Franklin D. Roosevelt's administration approved preliminary funds for site development of the Greater Cincinnati Airport on February 11, 1942. This was part of the United States Army Air Corps program to establish training facilities during World War II. At the time, air traffic in the area centered on Lunken Airport just southeast of central Cincinnati. Lunken opened in 1926 in the Ohio River Valley; it frequently experienced fog, and the 1937 flood submerged its runways and two-story terminal building. Federal officials wanted an airfield site that would not be prone to flooding, but Cincinnati officials hoped to build Lunken into the region's main airport.

Officials from Boone, Kenton, and Campbell counties in Kentucky took advantage of Cincinnati's short-sightedness and lobbied Congress to build an airfield there. Boone County officials offered a suitable site on the provision that Kenton County paid the acquisition cost. In October 1942, Congress provided $2 million to build four runways. Although the last of the land necessary to build the airport was not acquired until May 1943, site preparation had already begun. By mid March 1944, it had been named Greater Cincinnati Airport. The airport was to be "formally presented" to the City of Cincinnati in June.

The field opened August 12, 1944, with the first B-17 bombers beginning practice runs on August 15. As the tide of the war had already turned, the Air Corps only used the field until it was declared surplus in 1945. However, this was not before the first regularly scheduled air freight shipment in the United States arrived in mid-September, signalling the future importance of the airport.

On October 27, 1946, a small wooden terminal building opened and the airport prepared for commercial service. Boone County Airlines was the first airline to provide scheduled service from the airport and had its headquarters at the airport. (Note: Commercial flights had been previously carried out on an ad hoc basis due to the flooding of Lunken in March 1945.)

The first commercial flight, an American Airlines DC-3 from Cleveland, landed on January 10, 1947, at 9:53 am. A Delta Air Lines flight followed moments later. The April 1957 Official Airline Guide shows 97 weekday departures: 37 American, 26 Delta, 24 TWA, 8 Piedmont, and 2 Lake Central. As late as November 1959 the airport had four 5,500 ft (1,700 m) runways at 45-degree angles, the north–south runway eventually being extended into today's runway 18C/36C.

In the 1950s Cincinnati city leaders began pushing for expansion of a site in Blue Ash to both compete with the Greater Cincinnati Airport and replace Lunken as the city's primary airport. The city purchased Hugh Watson Field in 1955, turning it into Blue Ash Airport. The city's Blue Ash plans were hampered by community opposition, three failed Hamilton County bond measures, political infighting, and Cincinnati's decision not to participate in the federal airfield program.

=== Jet age ===
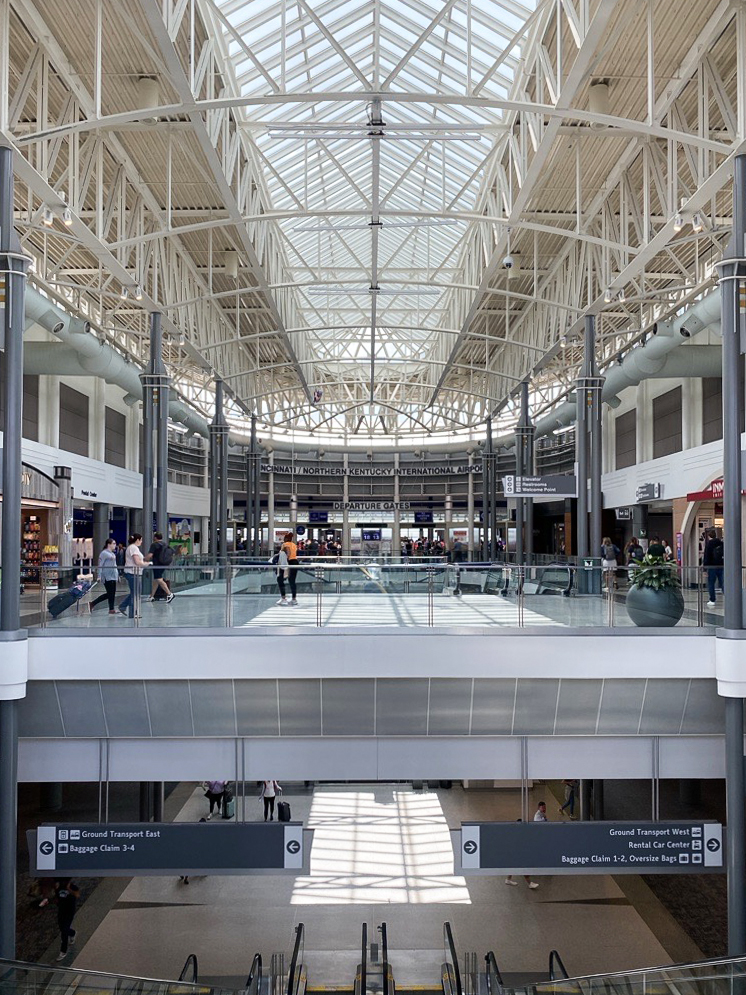
Main atrium

On December 16, 1960, the jet age arrived in Cincinnati when a Delta Air Lines Convair 880 from Miami completed the first scheduled jet flight. The airport needed to expand and build more modern terminals and other facilities; the original Terminal A was expanded and renovated. The north–south runway was extended from 3,100 to 8,600 ft (940 to 2,620 m). In 1964, the board approved a $12 million bond to expand the south concourse of Terminal A by 32,000 sq ft (3,000 m^{2}) and provide nine gates for TWA, American, and Delta. A new east–west runway crossing the longer north–south runway was constructed in 1971 south of the older east–west runway. A fire on June 15, 1975, significantly damaged the old terminal building and killed two firemen.

In 1977, before the Airline Deregulation Act was passed, CVG, like many small airports, anticipated the loss of numerous flights; creating the opportunity for Patrick Sowers, Robert Tranter, and David and Raymound Mueller to establish Comair to fill the void. The airline began service to Akron/Canton, Cleveland, and Evansville. In 1981, Comair became a public company, added 30-seat turboprops to its fleet, and began to rapidly expand its destinations. In 1984, Comair became a Delta Connection carrier with Delta's establishment of a hub at CVG. That same year, Comair introduced its first international flights from Cincinnati to Toronto. In 1992, Comair moved into Concourse C, as Delta Air Lines gradually continued to acquire more of the airline's stock. In 1993, Comair was the launch customer for the Canadair Regional Jet, of which it would later operate the largest fleet in the world. By 1999, Comair was the largest regional airline in the country worth over $2 billion, transporting 6 million passengers yearly to 83 destinations on 101 aircraft. Later that year, Delta Air Lines acquired the remaining portion of Comair's stock, causing Comair to solely operate Delta Connection flights. In the meantime, the airport had been renamed Greater Cincinnati International Airport in November 1978.

In 1988, two founders of Comair, Patrick Sowers and Robert Tranter launched a new scheduled airline from CVG named Enterprise Airlines, which served 16 cities at its peak. The airline spearheaded the regional jet revolution in a unique manner by operating 10-seat Cessna Citation business jets in scheduled services. The flights became popular with Cincinnati companies. The airline served destinations including Baltimore, Boston, Cedar Rapids, Columbus (OH), Green Bay, Greensboro, Greenville, Hartford, Memphis, Milwaukee, New York–JFK, and Wilmington (NC). The airline also became the first international feed carrier by feeding the British Airways Concorde at JFK. In 1991, the airline ceased operations because of high fuel prices and the suspension of the British Airways contract after the first Gulf War. The facility's name changed to Cincinnati/Northern Kentucky International Airport at the start of 1992.

=== Delta Air Lines hub ===
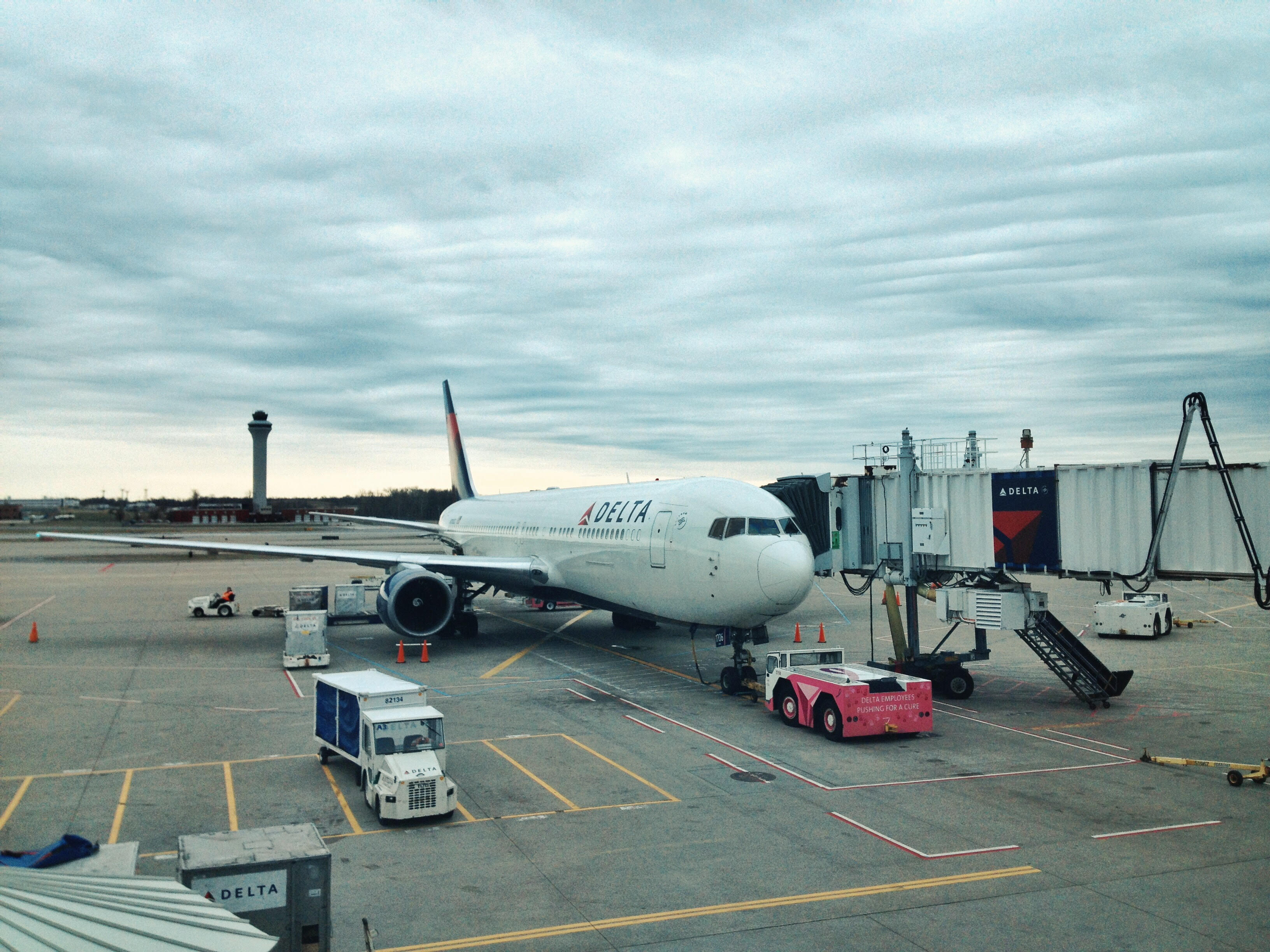
Delta Air Lines Boeing 767-300ER heading to Paris in 2015

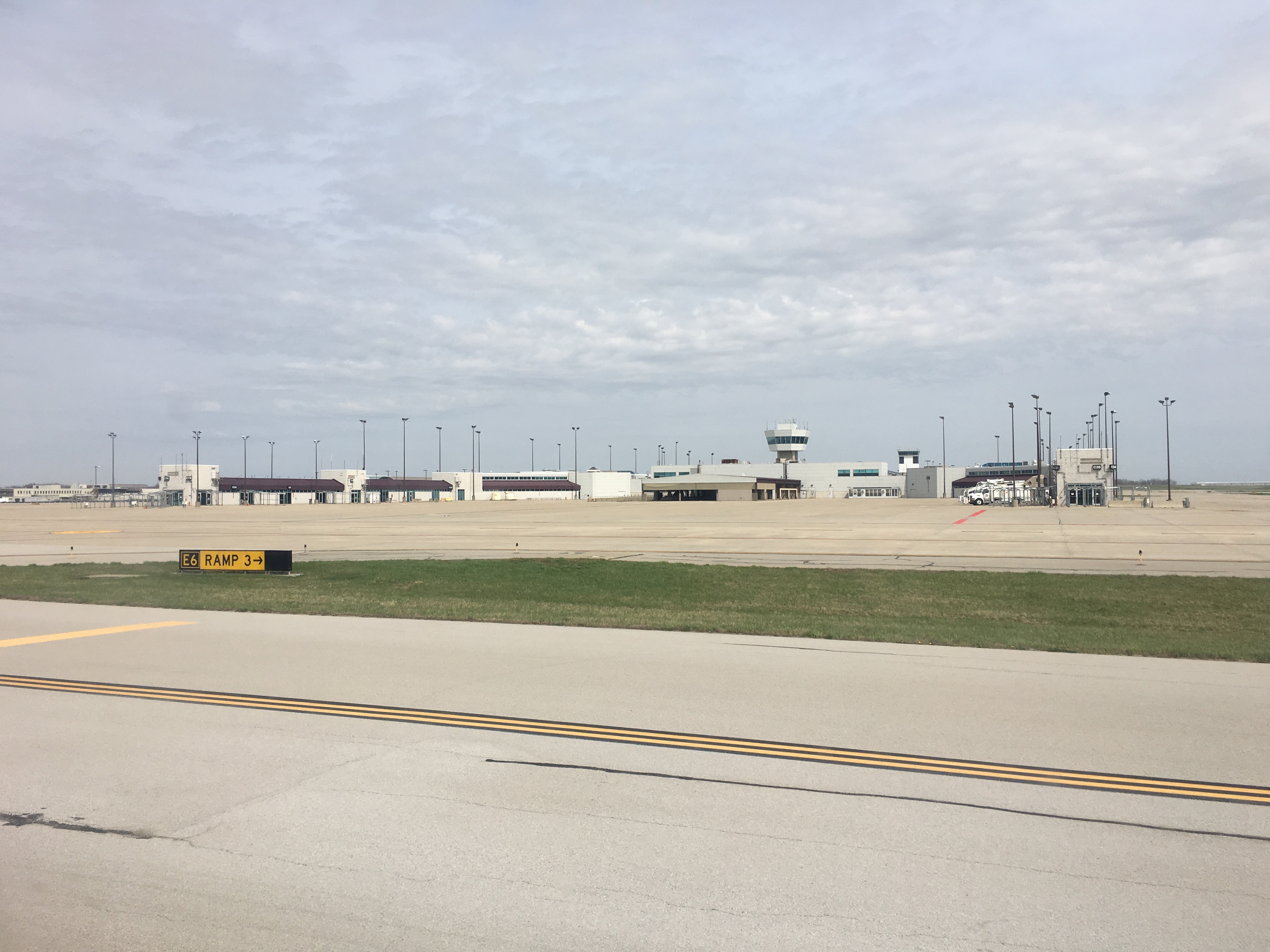
Concourse C in 2016

In the mid-1980s, Delta opened a hub in Cincinnati. Delta's continued growth at CVG then prompted them to spend $550 million to build their own terminal facility in the 1990s. The new terminal, known then as Terminal 3, opened in 1994 and would largely replace Terminal D. Terminal 3 consisted of three airside concourses, with most of Terminal D's gate space being repurposed into Terminal 3's Concourse A while Concourses B and C were new construction. Concourses A and B were parallel concourses connected to Terminal 3's main building by an underground walkway which also included a people mover (a similar layout to Delta's main hub at Hartsfield–Jackson Atlanta International Airport). Concourse C was only accessible by shuttle buses and was a ground-level facility for regional aircraft used by Delta Connection (operated by Comair). After the opening of Terminal 3, the former Terminals B and C were renamed Terminals 1 and 2 respectively, which continued to house non-Delta airlines.

Aircraft operations dramatically increased from around 300,000 to 500,000 yearly aircraft movements. In turn, passenger volumes doubled within a decade from 10 million to over 20 million. This expansion prompted the building of runway 18L/36R and the airport began making preparations to construct Concourse D while adding an expansion to Concourse A and B.

At its peak, CVG became Delta's second-largest hub, handling over 600 flights daily in 2005. It was the fourth largest hub in the world for a single airline, based on departures, ranking only behind Atlanta, Chicago–O'Hare, and Dallas/Fort Worth. The hub served everything from a 64-mile flight to Dayton, to a daily nonstop to Honolulu and Anchorage, to transatlantic destinations including Amsterdam, Brussels, Frankfurt, London, Manchester, Munich, Paris, Rome, and Zürich. Additionally, Air France operated flights into CVG for several periods for over a decade before finally terminating the service in 2007.

When Delta went into bankruptcy in September 2005, a large reduction at CVG eliminated most early-morning and night flights. These initial cuts caused additional routes to become unprofitable, causing the frequency of low-volume routes to be further cut from 2006 to 2007. Planning for the new east–west runway stopped, along with all expansions to current terminals; Terminal 1 was closed due to lack of service.

In 2008, Delta merged with Northwest Airlines and cut flight capacity from the Cincinnati hub by 22 percent with an additional 17 percent reduction in 2009. Concourse C, which had opened in 1994 at a cost of $50 million, was permanently closed in 2009 and demolished in 2016, since it was built for smaller regional jets which were going out of fashion, and it was not connected to the people mover system. Concourse C housed 23 shops and restaurants. Further reductions in early 2010 caused Delta to close Concourse A in Terminal 3 on May 1, consolidating all operations into Concourse B. This resulted in the layoff of more than 800 employees.

By 2011, Delta was down to roughly 130 flights per day at CVG. After several years of cuts to its older fleet, which were cited as being cut due to high costs associated with rising oil prices, Delta's wholly owned and CVG-based subsidiary, Comair, ceased all operations in September 2012, ending over three decades of operations. In 2017, the hub was downgraded to a focus city, which was eliminated in 2021.

=== Recent history ===
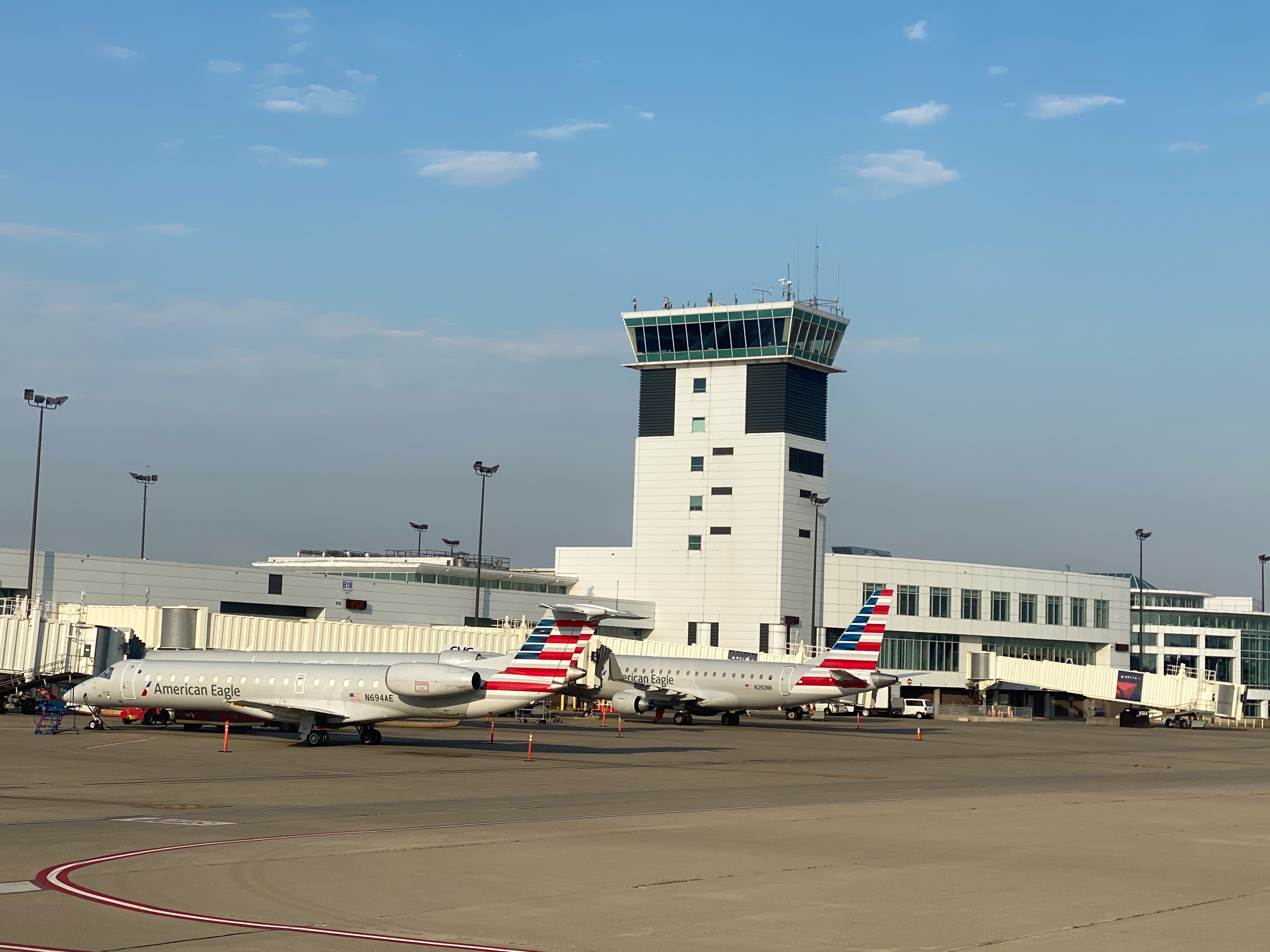
Concourse B ramp tower

Until 2015, CVG consistently ranked among the most expensive major airports in the United States. Delta operated over 75% of flights at CVG, a fact often cited as a reason for relatively high domestic ticket prices. Airline officials suggested that Delta was practicing predatory pricing to drive away discount airlines. From 1990 to 2003, ten discount airlines began service at CVG, but later pulled out, including Vanguard Airlines, which pulled out of CVG twice. After Delta downsized its hub operations, low cost carriers began operations and have been sustained at the airport ever since.

Terminal 2 was closed in May 2012, and CVG re-opened and consolidated all non-Delta airlines to Concourse A in Terminal 3 at that time, which became the sole terminal. Renovation and expansion of the ticketing/check-in area and Concourse A took place that year to accommodate the move. Terminals 1 and 2 were torn down in early 2017 to construct an overnight parking and deicing area. Both concourses, the customs facility, baggage claim, and ticketing areas were renovated in late 2017 to mid 2018 under a $4.5 million plan. In 2021, the airport opened a new rental car and ground transportation center adjacent to the main terminal.

== Facilities ==
=== Terminal ===
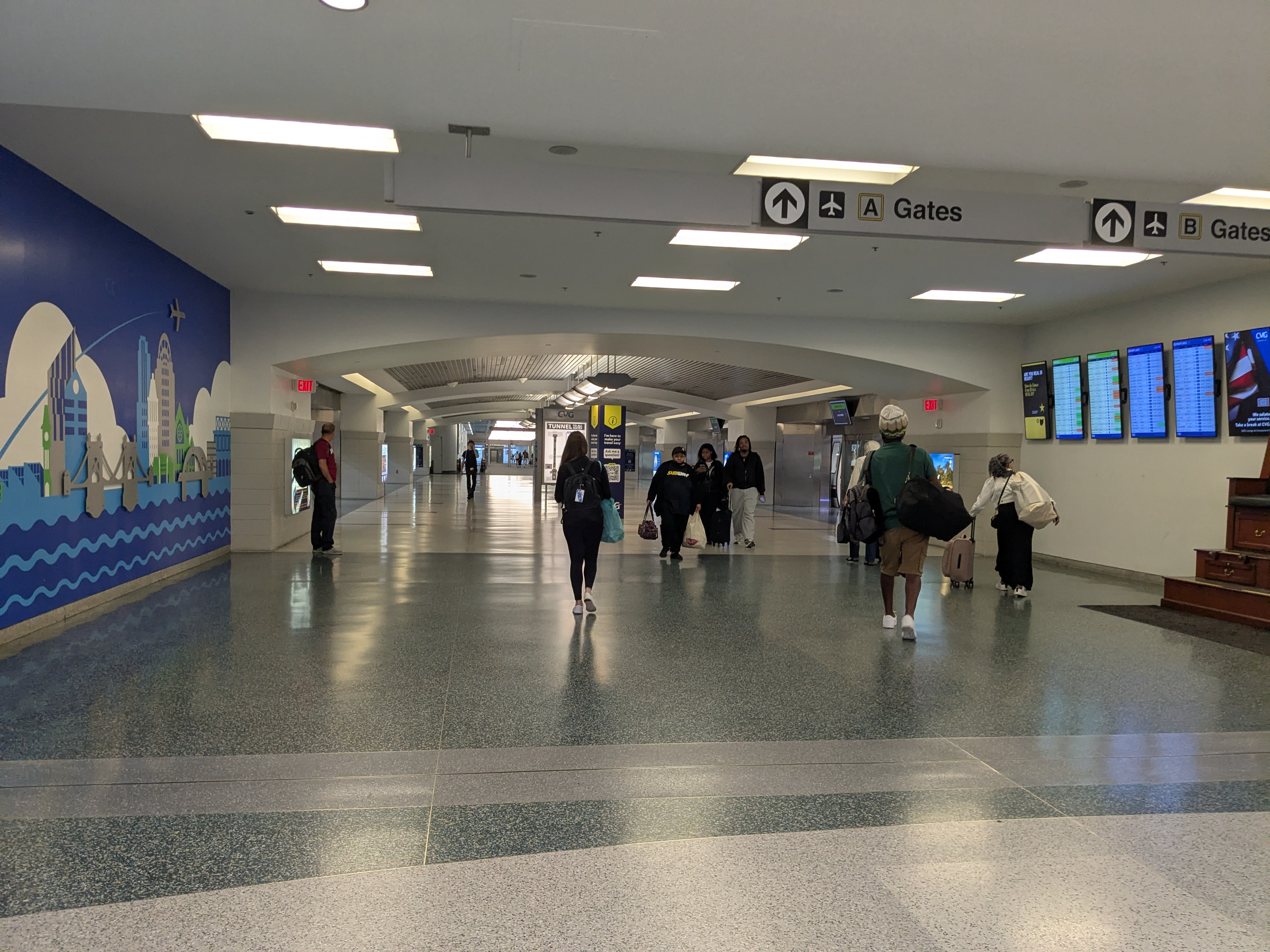
Underground walkway leading to Concourses A and B

The airport has one terminal and two concourses with a total of 51 gates. Both concourses are islands and are only accessible by an underground moving walkway and people mover. All international arrivals without pre-clearance are handled in Concourse B.

- Concourse A has 23 gates.
- Concourse B has 28 gates.

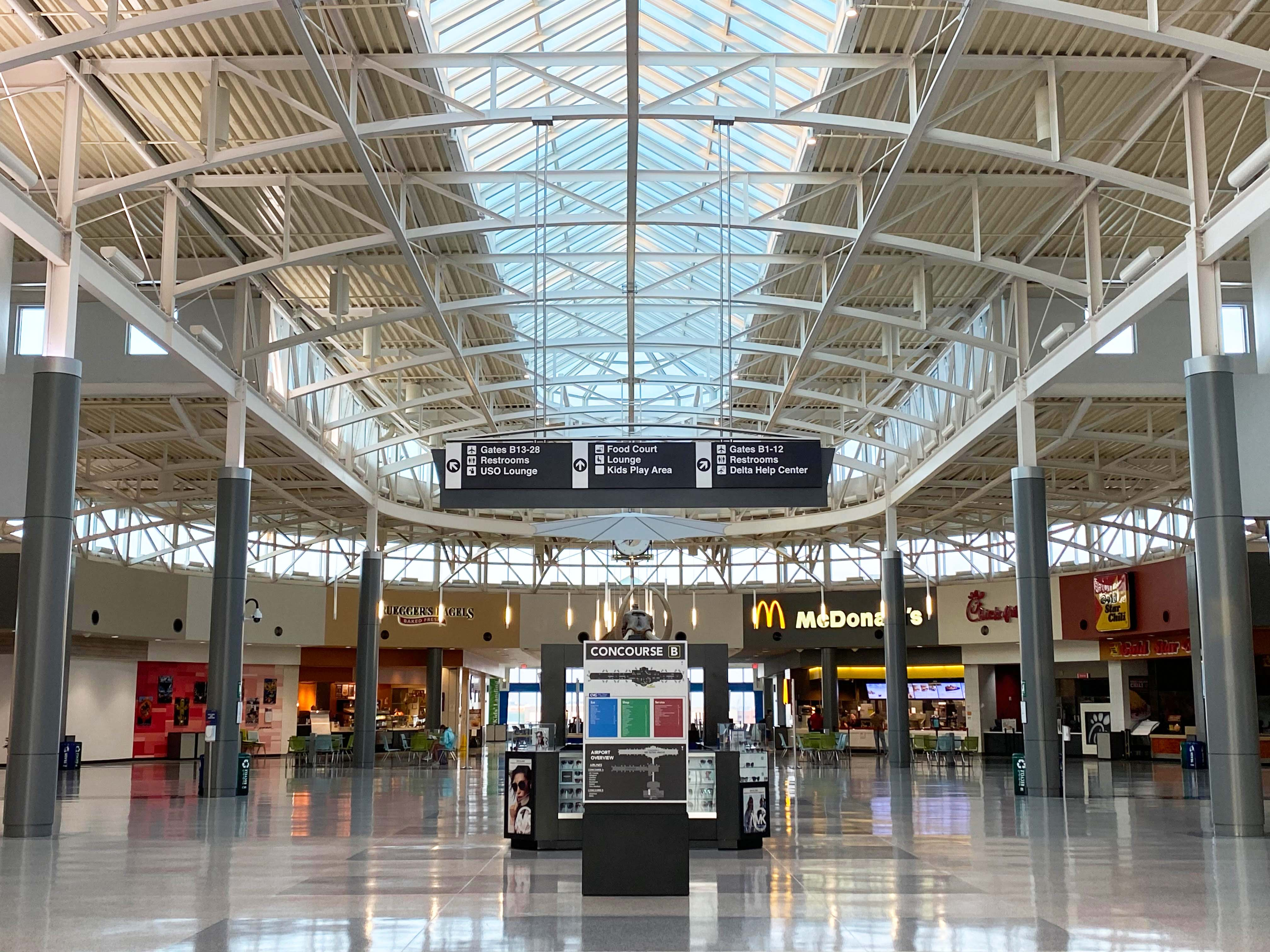
Interior view of Concourse B

==== Art ====
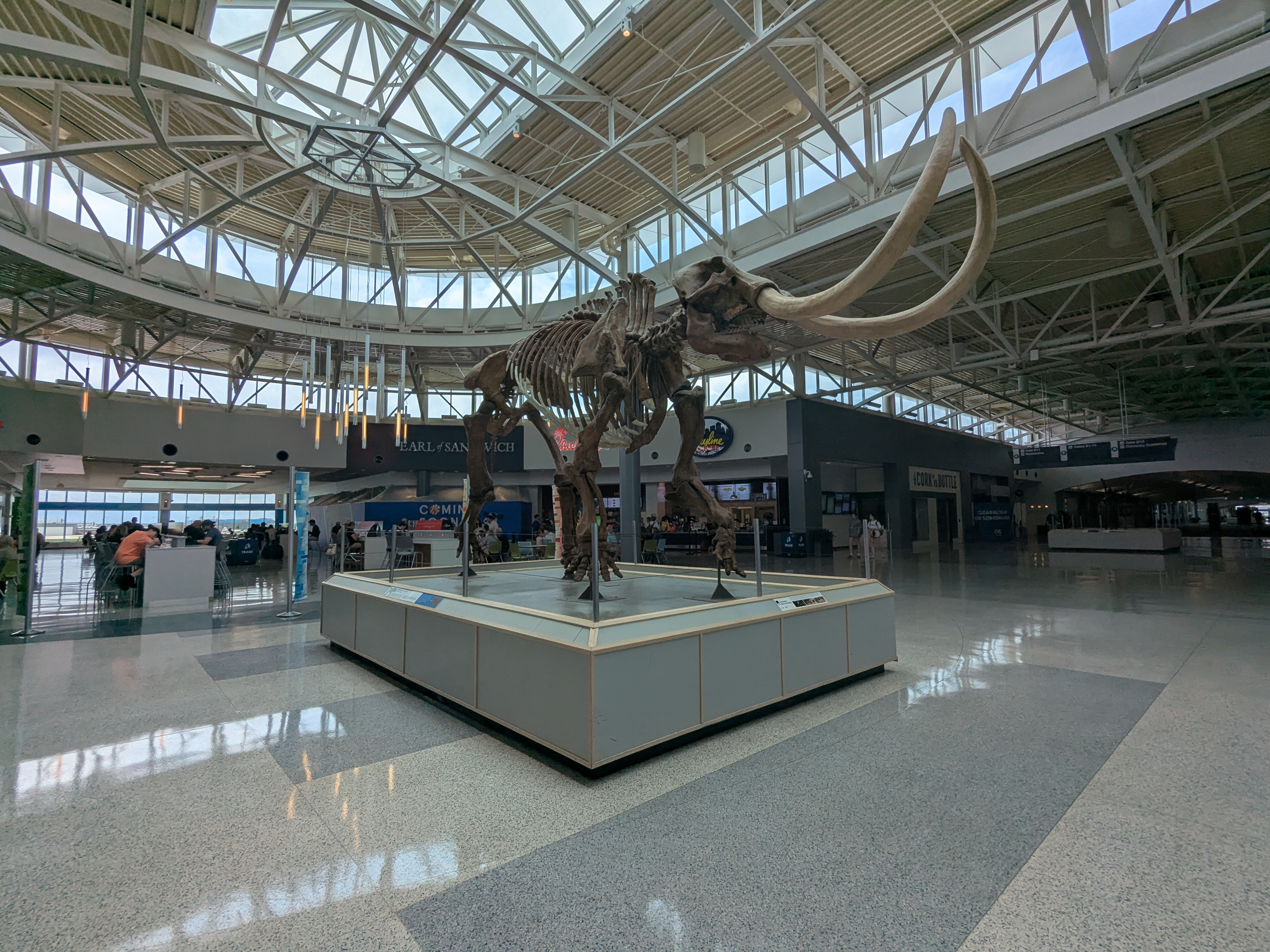
A Mastodon fossil at Concourse B

The current airport is home to 5 of 16 large Art Deco murals created for the train concourse building at Cincinnati Union Terminal during the station's construction in 1932. Mosaic murals depicting people at work in local Cincinnati workplaces were incorporated into the interior design of the railroad station by Winold Reiss, a German-born artist with a reputation in interior design. When the train concourse building was designated for demolition in 1972, a "Save the Terminal Committee" raised funds to remove and transport 14 of the murals in the concourse to new locations in the Airport. They were placed in Terminal 1, as well as Terminals 2 and 3, which were then being constructed as part of major airport expansion and renovation. When Terminals 1 and 2 were demolished, the murals in those areas were stored and the new Security Screening building was designed to accommodate the heavy weight of the murals with the eastern "store front" windows designed to be removable to permit the future installation of the murals. The murals were also featured in a scene in the film Rain Man starring Dustin Hoffman and Tom Cruise. In addition, a walkway to one of the terminals at CVG was featured in the scene in the film when Hoffman's character, Raymond, refused to fly on a plane. The nine murals located in the former Terminals 1 & 2 were relocated to the First Financial Center in downtown Cincinnati, while five murals remain in Terminal 3 to this day.

Additionally, there are several pieces of Charley Harper artwork in the Concourse B food court.

=== Cargo hubs ===
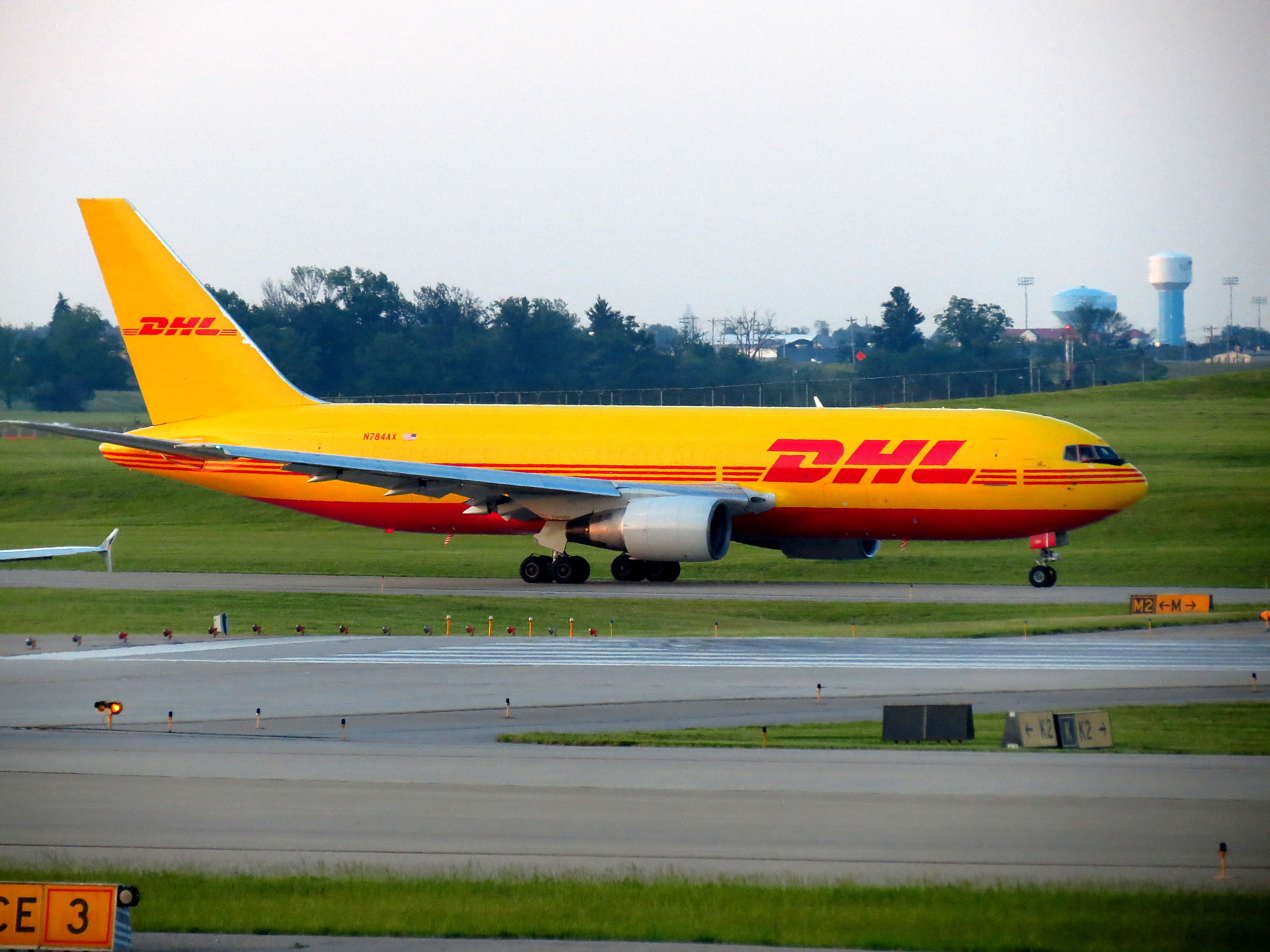
A DHL Boeing 767-200 (N784AX) taxiing at CVG

In 1984, DHL opened its CVG hub and began operations throughout the world. DHL has completed a $105 million expansion and employs approximately 2,500 at CVG. Because of this growth, CVG stood as the 4th busiest airport in North America based on cargo tonnage and 34th in the world at the time.

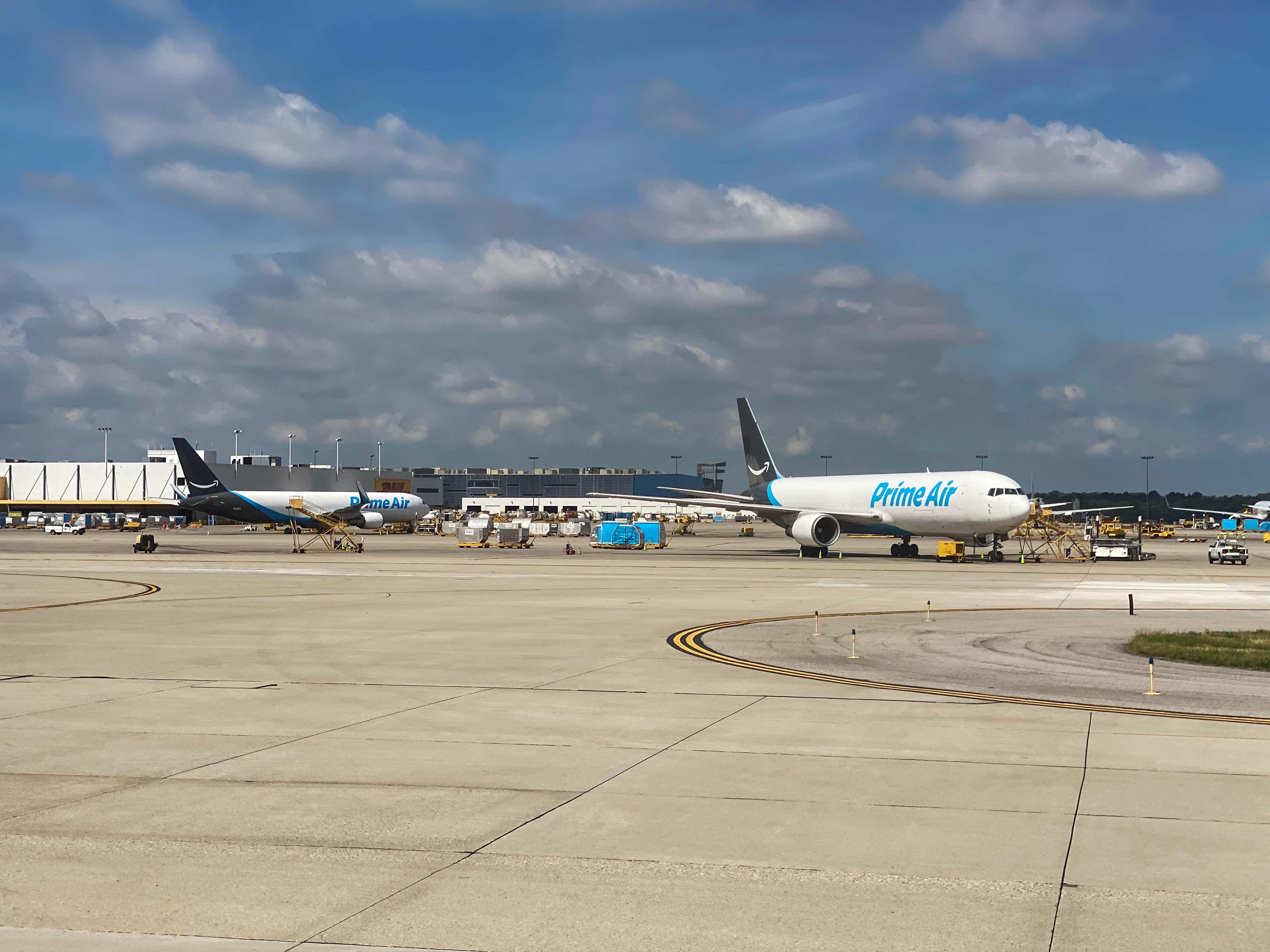
Amazon Air Boeing 767-300 cargo aircraft at CVG, its primary cargo hub

On May 28, 2015, DHL announced a $108M expansion to its current facility, which doubled the current cargo operations. The money was used to double the gate capacity for transferring cargo, an expansion to the sorting facility, and various technical improvements, which was completed in Autumn 2016. In addition, this has provided many more jobs for the Cincinnati area, and will dramatically increase the airport's operations.

On January 31, 2017, Amazon announced that its new cargo airline, Amazon Air would pick CVG as its main worldwide shipping hub, following an investment of $1.49B in the construction and expansion of a cargo facility on the airport grounds. The company used DHL's facilities prior to the construction of its new facility. The hub is Amazon's principal shipping hub and was constructed on 1,129 acres (457 ha) of land at the airport with a 3,000,000 ft^{2} (280,000 m^{2}) sorting facility and parking positions for over 100 aircraft. On April 30, 2017, Amazon began operations at CVG with 75 Boeing 767-200ER/300ER aircraft based at the airport and planned to have 200 daily takeoffs and landings from its CVG hub to destinations across the U.S. and internationally. The hub could create up to 15,000 jobs in the Cincinnati/Northern Kentucky region.

By early 2026, the Amazon Air primary hub reached its full phase-one operational capacity, managing over 200 daily flights and solidifying CVG's position as one of the top five cargo gateways in North America. The 3,000,000-square-foot facility now processes an estimated 50 million packages per month, significantly impacting the regional logistics infrastructure and workforce in Boone County.

=== Ground transportation ===
The TANK 2X bus provides direct service to Florence and downtown Cincinnati.

CVG is served by Interstate 275 via exit 4.

=== Airport Viewing Area ===
The Airport Viewing Area is a paved area with parking spots, porta-potties, a playground, and benches. The Airport viewing area serves as a photography spot for people wanting to take photos of planes landing/taking off overhead on runway 27 or on the parallel runway 36R/18L. The Airport viewing area is open from 8 a.m. to 10 p.m.

== Airlines and destinations ==
=== Passenger ===
Airlines	Destinations	Refs
Air Canada Express	Toronto–Pearson; Seasonal: Montréal–Trudeau	
Alaska Airlines	Seattle/Tacoma	
Allegiant Air	Austin, Charleston (SC), Destin/Fort Walton Beach, Fort Lauderdale, Gulf Shores, Jacksonville (FL), Key West, Las Vegas, Melbourne/Orlando, Myrtle Beach, New Orleans, Orlando (begins February 12, 2027), Orlando/Sanford, Phoenix/Mesa, Punta Gorda (FL), Sarasota, Savannah, St. Petersburg/Clearwater, West Palm Beach	
American Airlines	Charlotte, Dallas/Fort Worth, Phoenix–Sky Harbor; Seasonal: Cancún, Chicago–O'Hare, Miami	
American Eagle	Boston, Charlotte, Chicago–O'Hare, Miami, New York–JFK, Philadelphia, Washington–National	
Breeze Airways	Charleston (SC); Seasonal: Greenville/Spartanburg, Hartford, Portland (ME), San Diego, San Francisco	
British Airways	London–Heathrow	
Delta Air Lines	Atlanta, Fort Lauderdale, Fort Myers, Las Vegas, Los Angeles, Minneapolis/St. Paul, Orlando, Paris–Charles de Gaulle, Salt Lake City, Seattle/Tacoma, Tampa; Seasonal: Cancún	
Delta Connection	Austin, Boston, Detroit, Minneapolis/St. Paul, Newark, New York–JFK, New York–LaGuardia, Raleigh/Durham, Washington–National	
Frontier Airlines	Atlanta, Dallas/Fort Worth, Denver, Fort Lauderdale, Fort Myers, Orlando, Tampa; Seasonal: Cancún, Miami	
Southwest Airlines	Austin, Baltimore Chicago–Midway Denver Nashville Orlando, Phoenix–Sky Harbor	
Sun Country Airlines	Denver (begins May 27, 2027); Seasonal: Minneapolis/St. Paul	
United Airlines	Chicago–O'Hare, Denver, Houston–Intercontinental, San Francisco	
United Express	Chicago–O'Hare, Houston–Intercontinental, Newark, Washington–Dulles	
Viva	Seasonal: Cancún	

=== Cargo ===
Airlines	Destinations	Refs
Amazon Air	Houston–Intercontinental, Manchester (NH), San Bernardino	
DHL Aviation	Anchorage, Atlanta, Austin, Bahrain, Baltimore, Bogotá, Boston, Brussels, Calgary, Cedar Rapids/Iowa City, Chicago–O'Hare, Dallas/Fort Worth, Denver, East Midlands, Edmonton, El Paso, Greensboro, Guadalajara, Hamilton (ON), Harlingen, Hong Kong, Honolulu, Houston–Intercontinental, Kansas City, Leipzig/Halle, London–Heathrow, Los Angeles, Memphis, Mexico City–AIFA, Miami, Milan–Malpensa, Milwaukee, Minneapolis/St. Paul, Monterrey, Montréal–Mirabel, Nagoya–Centrair, Newark, New Orleans, New York–JFK, Omaha, Orlando, Panama City–Tocumen, Philadelphia, Phoenix–Sky Harbor, Querétaro, Richmond, Rochester, Sacramento–Mather, Salt Lake City, San Antonio, San Diego, San Francisco, San Juan, Seattle/Tacoma, Seoul–Incheon, St. Louis, Tokyo–Narita, Tulsa, Vancouver, Winnipeg	
Silk Way West Airlines	Anchorage, Baku, Luxembourg, Seoul–Incheon	

== Statistics ==
=== Top destinations ===
Busiest domestic routes from CVG (May 2025 - April 2026)
Rank	City	Passengers	Carriers
1	Atlanta, Georgia	435,000	Delta, Frontier
2	Chicago–O'Hare, Illinois	281,000	American, United
3	Orlando, Florida	270,000	Delta, Frontier, Southwest
4	Dallas/Fort Worth, Texas	228,000	American, Frontier
5	Denver, Colorado	217,000	Allegiant, Frontier, Southwest, United
6	Charlotte, North Carolina	158,000	American
7	Fort Lauderdale, Florida	139,000	Allegiant, Delta, Frontier
8	New York–LaGuardia, New York	126,000	Delta, Frontier
9	Minneapolis/St. Paul, Minnesota	115,000	Delta, Sun Country
10	Tampa, Florida	114,100	Delta, Frontier, Southwest

Busiest cargo routes from CVG (January 2019)
Rank	City	Cargo (pounds)	Carriers
1	Anchorage, Alaska	38,686,878	AirBridgeCargo, DHL
2	Leipzig/Halle, Germany	14,447,211	AirBridgeCargo, DHL
3	Miami, Florida	14,427,248	Amazon, American, DHL
4	Chicago–O'Hare, Illinois	10,341,326	Amazon, American, Delta, DHL, United
5	Dallas/Fort Worth, Texas	8,819,609	Amazon, American, Delta, DHL
6	Phoenix–Sky Harbor, Arizona	8,431,588	Amazon, Delta, DHL
7	Brussels, Belgium	8,223,096	AirBridgeCargo, DHL
8	Guadalajara, Mexico	7,990,928	AeroUnion, Cargojet, DHL
9	Houston, Texas	7,066,885	Amazon, Delta, DHL, United

=== Airline market share ===
Largest airlines at CVG (May 2025 - April 2026)
Rank	Airline	Passengers	Share
1	Delta Air Lines	2,070,000	24.61%
2	Allegiant Air	1,030,000	12.24%
3	Frontier Airlines	1,010,000	12.01%
4	Endeavor Air	822,000	9.78%
5	American Airlines	751,000	8.94%
–	Other	2,727,000	32.43%

=== Annual traffic ===
Annual passenger traffic at CVG 1992–present
Year	Passengers	YoY change	Year	Passengers	YoY change	Year	Passengers	YoY change	Year	Passengers	YoY change
1992	11,545,682	—	2002	20,812,642	▲7.3%	2012	6,038,817	▼14.2%	2022	7,573,416	▲20.6%
1993	12,213,874	▲5.8%	2003	21,197,447	▲1.9%	2013	5,718,255	▼5.3%	2023	8,718,443	▲15.1%
1994	13,593,522	▲11.3%	2004	22,062,557	▲4.1%	2014	5,908,711	▲3.3%	2024	9,212,348	▲5.7%
1995	15,181,728	▲11.7%	2005	22,778,785	▲3.2%	2015	6,316,332	▲6.9%	2025	8,971,128	▼2.6%
1996	18,795,766	▲23.8%	2006	16,244,962	▼28.7%	2016	6,773,905	▲7.2%	2026	4,458,580 (YTD)	—
1997	19,866,308	▲5.7%	2007	15,736,220	▼3.1%	2017	7,842,149	▲15.8%	2027		
1998	21,124,216	▲6.3%	2008	13,630,443	▼13.4%	2018	8,865,568	▲13.1%	2028		
1999	21,753,512	▲3.0%	2009	10,621,655	▼22.1%	2019	9,103,554	▲2.7%	2029		
2000	22,406,384	▲3.0%	2010	7,977,588	▼24.9%	2020	3,615,139	▼60.3%	2030		
2001	17,270,475	▼22.9%	2011	7,034,263	▼11.8%	2021	6,282,253	▲73.8%	2031		

== Accidents and incidents ==
- On January 12, 1955, 1955 Cincinnati mid-air collision, a Martin 2-0-2 was in the take off phase of departure from the airport when it collided with a privately owned Castleton Farm DC-3. The mid-air collision killed 13 people on the commercial airliner and two on the privately owned plane.
- On November 14, 1961, Zantop cargo flight, a DC-4, crashed near runway 18 into an apple orchard. The crew survived.
- On November 8, 1965, American Airlines Flight 383, a Boeing 727, crashed on approach to runway 18C, killing 58 (53 passengers and five crew) of the 62 (56 passengers and six crew) on board.
- On November 6, 1967, TWA Flight 159, a Boeing 707, overran the runway during an aborted takeoff, injuring 11 of the 29 passengers. One of the injured passengers died four days later. The seven crew members were unhurt.
- On November 20, 1967, TWA Flight 128, a Convair 880, crashed on approach to runway 18, killing 70 (65 passengers and five crew) of the 82 persons aboard (75 passengers and seven crew).
- On October 8, 1979, Comair Flight 444, a Piper Navajo, crashed shortly after takeoff. Seven passengers and the pilot were killed.
- On June 2, 1983, Air Canada Flight 797, a DC-9 flying on the Dallas-Toronto-Montreal route, made an emergency landing at Cincinnati due to a cabin fire. 23 of the 41 passengers died of smoke inhalation or fire burns, including folk singer Stan Rogers. All five crew members survived.
- On August 13, 2004, Air Tahoma Flight 185, a Convair 580, was en route to Cincinnati from Memphis, Tennessee, carrying freight under contract for DHL Worldwide Express. The aircraft crashed on a golf course just south of the Cincinnati airport due to fuel starvation and dual engine failure, killing the first officer and injuring the captain.

== See also ==
- Ohio World War II Army Airfields
- Kentucky World War II Army Airfields
- Cincinnati Municipal Lunken Airport
- Cincinnati–Blue Ash Airport
- Cincinnati West Airport
