= Metal Aircraft Flamingo =

American light aircraft

Flamingo
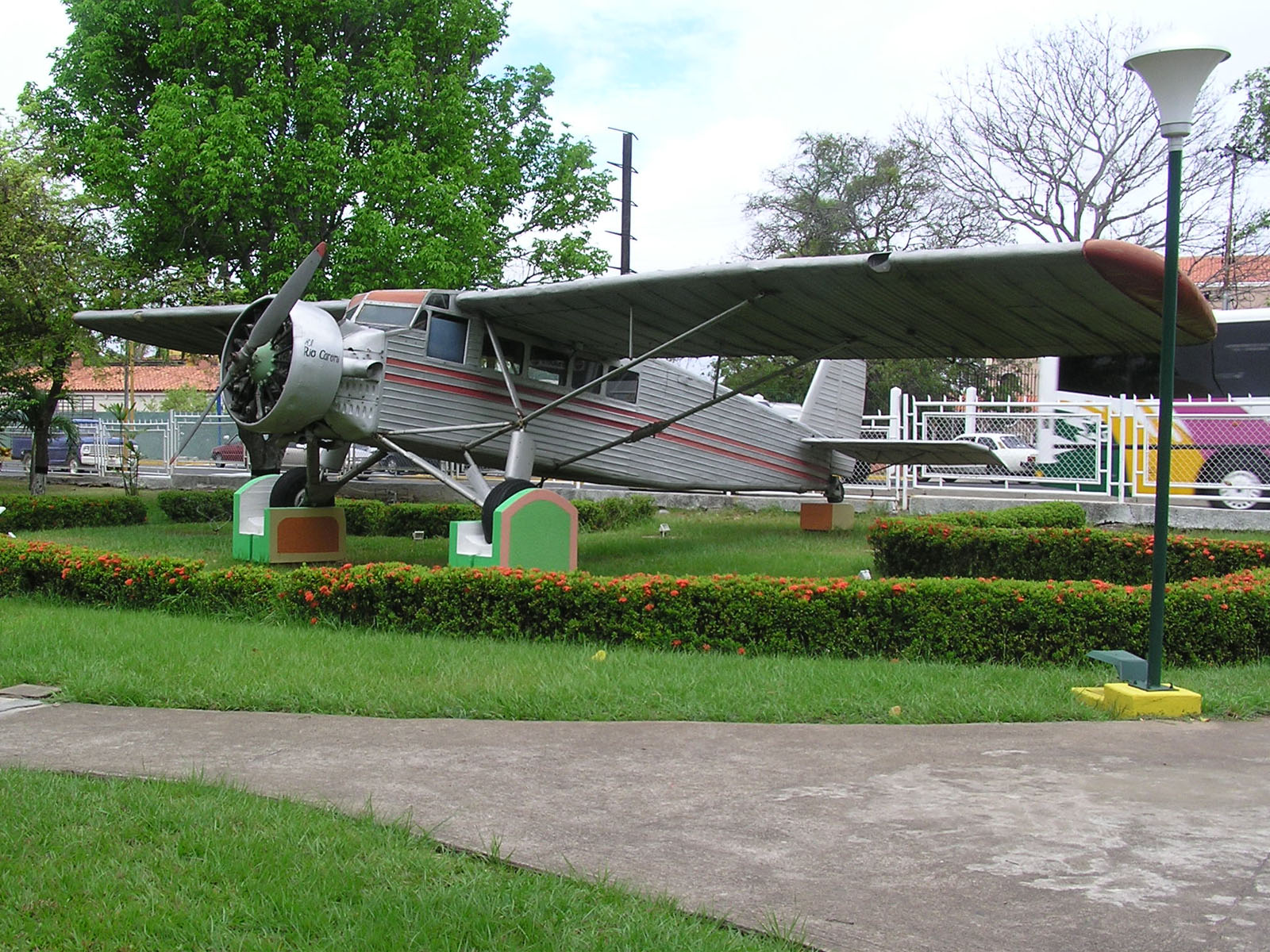
- G-2-W Flamingo El Rio Caroní, on display at Ciudad Bolívar airport, in Venezuela

General information
- Type: Passenger monoplane
- National origin: United States of America
- Manufacturer: Metal Aircraft Corporation
- Designer: Ralph R. Graichen
- Status: Retired
- Number built: 21

History
- First flight: 8 April 1928

The Metal Aircraft Flamingo was a monoplane produced in Cincinnati, Ohio by the Metal Aircraft Corporation in the 1930s.

== Design and development ==
The Metal Aircraft Corporation purchased the design from the Halpin Development Co. and unveiled it at the 1929 National Air Races with Elinor Smith. Following an accident at Bowman Field in May 1928, the prototype Flamingo was redesigned with a different nose, windscreen, and tail. The interior was insulated with Balsam-Wool Blanket.

== Operational history ==
The Flamingo was first flown from Lunken Airport on 8 April 1928 by Thomas E. Halpin. At one point, the aircraft carried an African-American porter in a red suit named Benny Smith. Following a teaser, marketing for the new airplane began in March 1929 and dealers were being solicited by the following month.

One G-2-W, named El Rio Caroní, is best remembered for its role in the discovery of Angel Falls by Jimmy Angel in 1935. Although well known to the local indigenous population, the falls had been glimpsed only by European explorers until Jimmy Angel crash-landed while attempting to land above the falls on Auyán-tepui during gold exploration.

The Metal Aircraft Corporation Flamingo that crashed above the falls was recovered by helicopter in the 1960s by the Venezuelan government and is on display at the entrance of the Ciudad Bolívar airport, in Venezuela. A replica was put in its place for visitors of the crash site.

Other operators included the Mason & Dixon airline. Another operator of the aircraft was United States Airways which flew a route from Denver to Kansas City in the early 1930s. Stops were made Goodland, Salina, and Topeka, Kansas.

== Variants ==
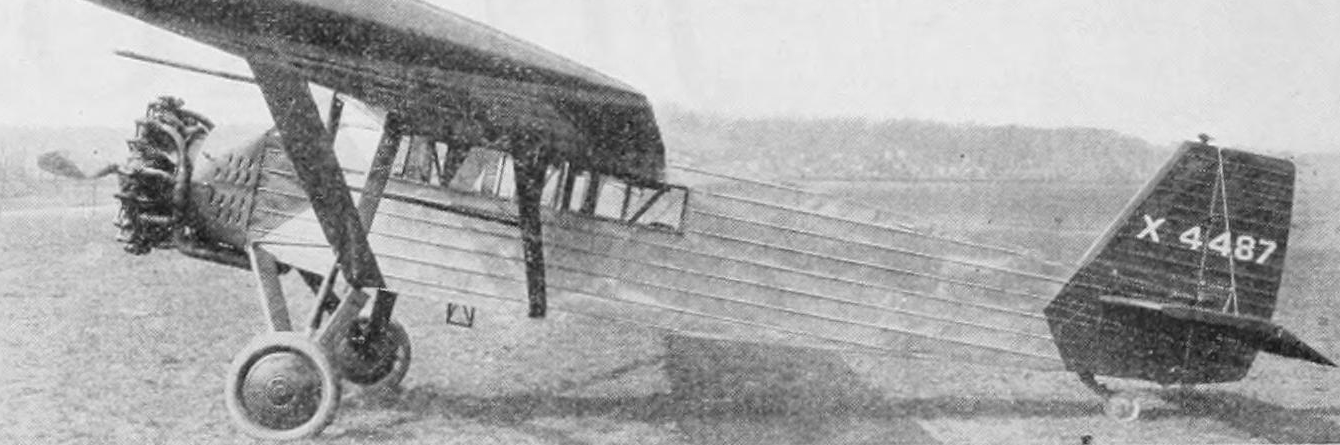
Halpin Flamingo photo from Aero Digest May 1928

Halpin Flamingo
six-passenger 410hp P&W
G-1
five-passenger 450hp P&W
G-2
six-passenger
G-2-H
six-passenger 525hp P&W

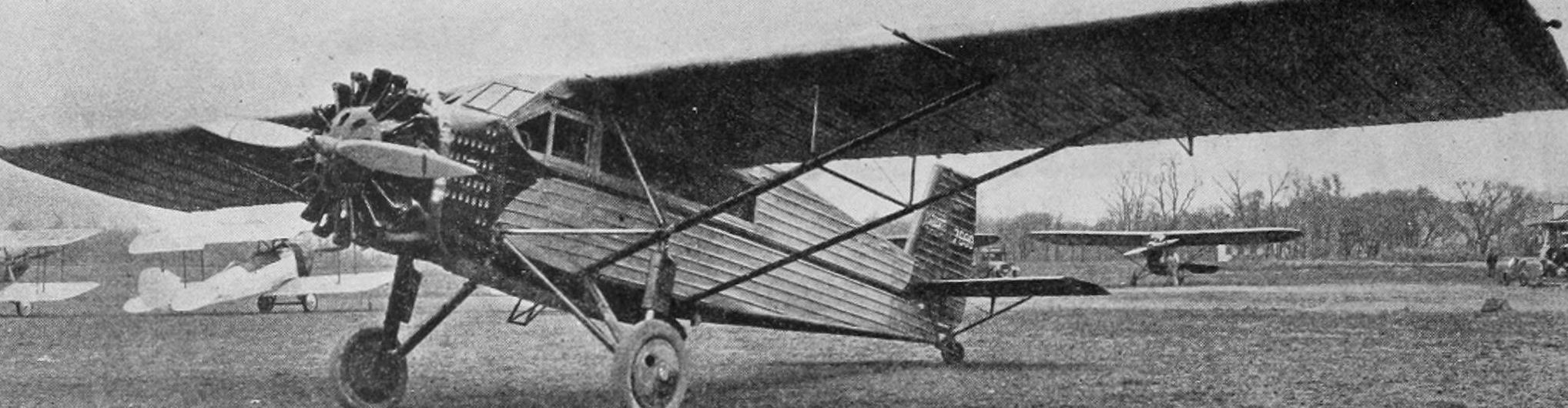
Metal Aircraft Corp Flamingo G-2-W photo from Aero Digest March 1929

G-2-W
eight-passenger 410hp P&W
G-MT-6
five-passenger 410 or 525 P&W

== Operators ==
External image
- A G-2 operated by the Embry-Riddle Company.

United States

- Comet Air Express
- Embry-Riddle Division of American Airways
- Iowa Airways Corporation
- Mason & Dixon Airlines – 4 aircraft
- United States Airways
- Vermilya-Huffman Flying Service

== Accidents and incidents ==
- On 26 May 1928, a Flamingo nosed over on landing at Bowman Field in Louisville, Kentucky, injuring the pilot, mechanic, and a passenger.
- On 8 November 1930, a G-2 operated by the Embry-Riddle Company made an emergency landing near Indianapolis following an in-flight fire.

== Specifications (Flamingo G-2-W) ==
Data from Skyways, Air and Space

General characteristics

- Capacity: eight
- Length: 32 ft 6 in (9.91 m)
- Height: 9 ft 6 in (2.90 m)
- Empty weight: 2,960 lb (1,343 kg)
- Gross weight: 5,600 lb (2,540 kg)
- Powerplant: 1 × Pratt & Whitney R-1340 Wasp 9-cyl. air-cooled radial piston engine, 410 hp (310 kW)

Performance

- Maximum speed: 117 kn (135 mph, 217 km/h)
- Cruise speed: 100 kn (115 mph, 185 km/h)
- Range: 870 nmi (1,000 mi, 1,600 km)
- Rate of climb: 800 ft/min (4.1 m/s)
