= Enterprise Airlines =

U.S. airline

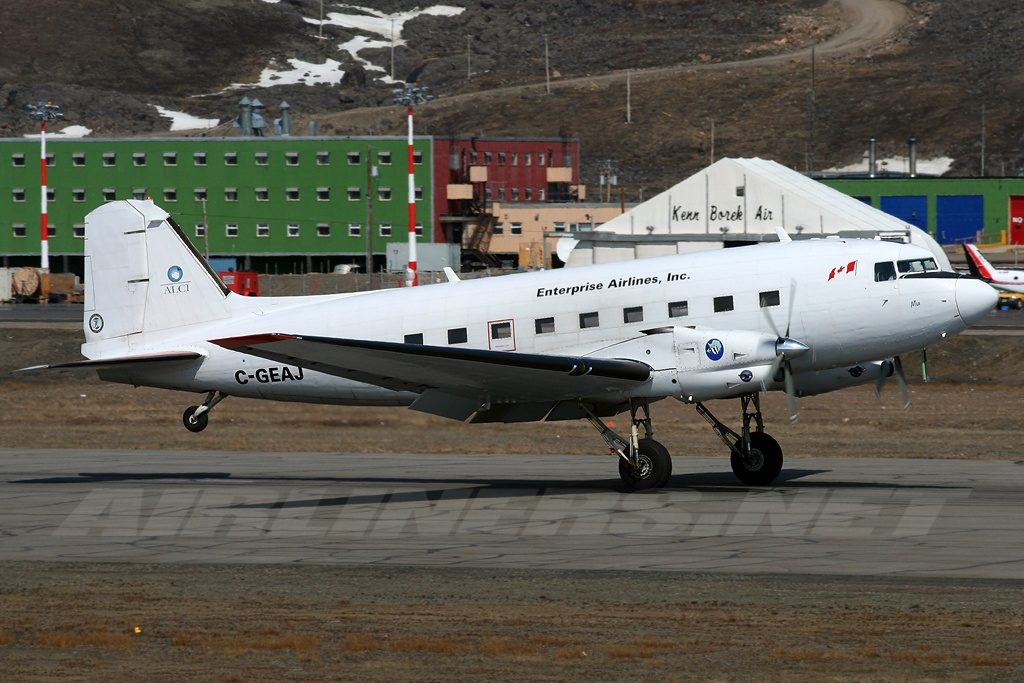
| IATA | ICAO | Call sign |
|---|---|---|
| BE | – | – |
- Founded: 1988; 38 years ago
- Ceased operations: 1990; 36 years ago
- Hubs: Cincinnati/Northern Kentucky International Airport
- Headquarters: Cincinnati, Ohio, USA

Enterprise Airlines was a scheduled airline based in Cincinnati, Ohio, USA. It operated scheduled service to 14 destinations from Cincinnati and from another focus city, Columbus Ohio.

== History ==
In May 1988, Patrick Sowers and Robert Tranter, two of the founders of Comair, along with Ron Williams launched a new scheduled regional jet airline at the Cincinnati/Northern Kentucky International Airport, named Enterprise Airlines. The company began with two Citation II jets and quickly grew to a fleet of seven with annual revenues of $11 million by the end of the second year.

The company is credited with "spearheading the regional jet revolution". Enterprise served 14 cities at its peak with over 50 daily departures. The "corporate commuter" operated seven 10-passenger Citation II business jets and targeted local business travelers with convenient, same day, non-stop flights to regional destinations with inadequate direct service. The company was created as a hub by-pass, time saving alternative to the lengthy delays experienced when making connecting flights at hub airports. The service was widely accepted.

Sticking to its innovative roots, in 1989 Enterprise became the first international code sharing partner to British Airways by feeding premium traffic to the "Concorde" at Kennedy from Hartford and Boston - aptly named, the "Concorde Connection". In addition it connected business travelers from Hartford to Boston to connect to British Airways evening transatlantic, 747 first and business class passengers.

In November 1990, Enterprise was forced to cease operations and liquidate due to rising fuel prices resulting from the first Gulf War and from a suspension of the lucrative BA contract during that period.

== Destinations ==
The airline served destinations including Baltimore (BWI), Boston (BOS), Cedar Rapids (CID), Columbus (CMH), Cincinnati (CVG) Green Bay (GRB), Greensboro (GSO), Greenville/Spartanburg (GSP), Hartford/Springfield (BDL), Memphis (MEM), Milwaukee (MKE), New York (JFK), and Wilmington (ILM). In addition, it offered specialized "scheduled" service to local Fortune 100 clients on a weekly shuttle basis to their remote plant locations in Missouri and Pennsylvania.

== Fleet ==
The Enterprise Airlines fleet consisted of the following business jet aircraft:

- Cessna Citation II

== See also ==
- List of defunct airlines of the United States
