= Midwest Airways =

- Commenced operations: 1959
- Ceased operations: 1972
- Headquarters: Cincinnati, Ohio
- Key people: Edmund Lunken (President)

Midwest Airways was an airline headquartered on the grounds of Lunken Field in Cincinnati, Ohio.

== History ==
The airline began operations in 1959 and went defunct in 1972.

== Destinations ==
| Country | State / province | City | Airport | Notes | Refs |
|---|---|---|---|---|---|
| United States | Michigan | Detroit | Unknown | | |
| United States | Michigan | Petoskey | Harbor Springs Airport | | |
| United States | Ohio | Cincinnati | Lunken Airport | Hub | |
| United States | Ohio | Cleveland | Unknown | | |
| United States | Ohio | Columbus | Unknown | | |

== Fleet ==
=== Historical fleet ===
Midwest Airways historical fleet
| Aircraft | Total | Introduced | Retired | Notes |
|---|---|---|---|---|
| Lockheed Model 10 Electra | 3 | Unknown | Unknown | |

== See also ==
- List of defunct airlines of the United States
