= Lunken Airport =

Regional airport in Cincinnati, Ohio, United States

Cincinnati Municipal Airport
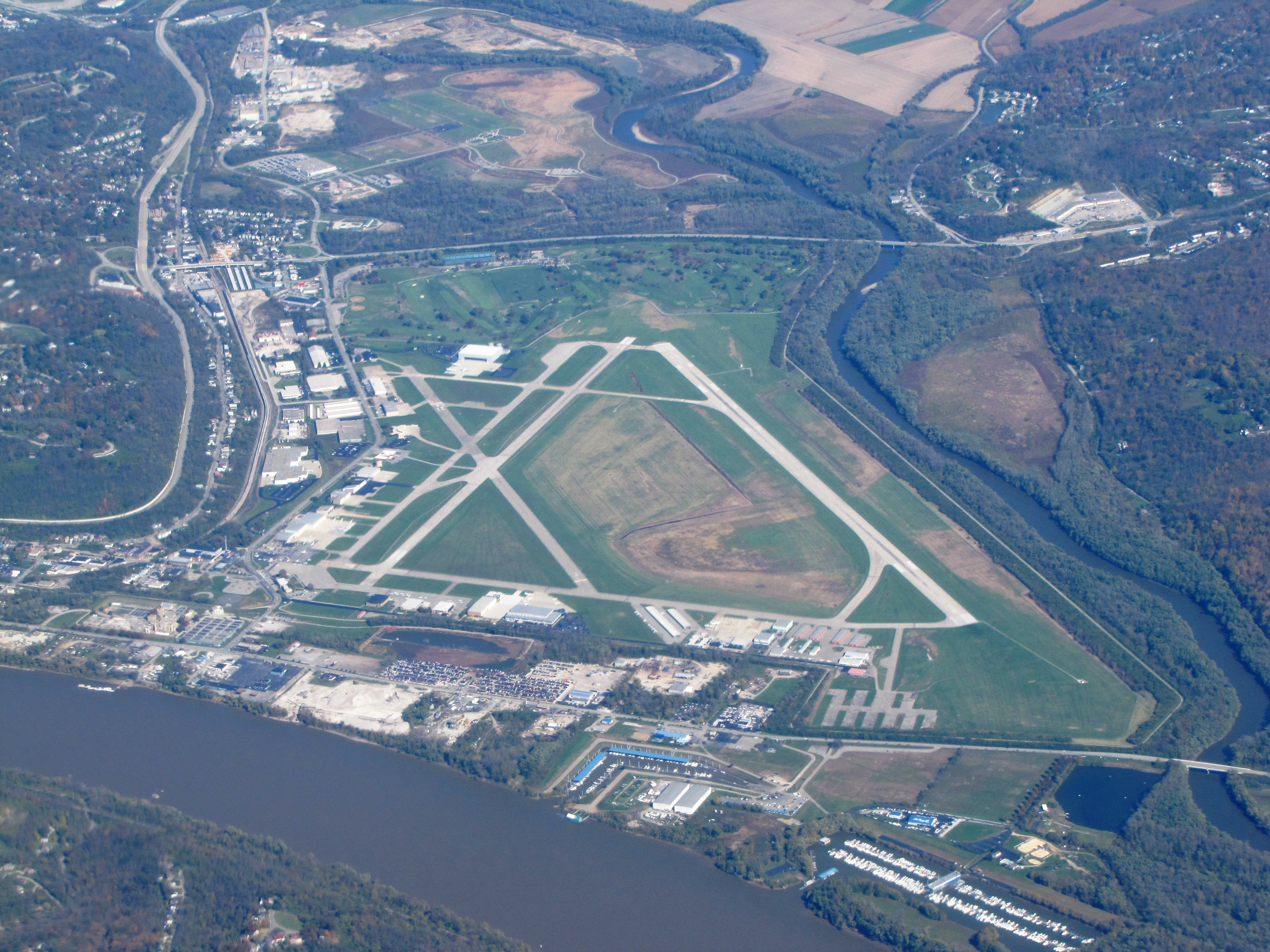
- IATA: LUK; ICAO: KLUK; FAA LID: LUK

Summary
- Airport type: Public
- Owner: City of Cincinnati
- Serves: Cincinnati metropolitan area
- Location: Cincinnati, Ohio, U.S.
- Opened: 1925; 101 years ago
- Time zone: EST (UTC−05:00)
  - Summer (DST): EDT (UTC−04:00)
- Elevation AMSL: 483 ft (147 m)
- Coordinates: 39°06′12″N 084°25′07″W
- Website: LUK website

Map
- Location of airport in Ohio LUK (the United States)

Runways
Direction	Length		Surface
Direction	ft	m	Surface
~~3L/21R~~	~~3,801~~	~~1,159~~	~~Asphalt~~
3R/21L	6,101	1,860	Asphalt
7/25	5,127	1,563	Asphalt

Statistics (2022)
- Aircraft operations: 114,630
- Based aircraft: 150
- Source: Federal Aviation Administration

Cincinnati Municipal Airport – Lunken Field (Cincinnati Municipal Lunken Airport) (IATA: LUK, ICAO: KLUK, FAA LID: LUK) is a public airport in Cincinnati, Ohio, three miles (5 km) east of downtown. Owned by the city of Cincinnati, it serves private aircraft, including the fleets of local corporations, and is the second-largest airport serving Cincinnati after Cincinnati/Northern Kentucky International Airport, the area’s primary airport.

Known as Lunken Airport or Lunken Field, after Eshelby Lunken, it is bounded by US Route 50 (historic Columbia Parkway and Eastern Avenue) to the west, US Route 52 (Kellogg Avenue) and the Ohio River to the south, the Little Miami River (which originally flowed through the airfield but was diverted) to the east, and Ohio Route 125 (Beechmont Avenue) to the north.

The airport was the headquarters and hub for Cincinnati-based public charter airline Ultimate Air Shuttle, which served five destinations in the eastern United States with sixteen peak daily flights. Service from Ultimate Air Shuttle was suspended in 2020 and has not been restarted.

== History ==
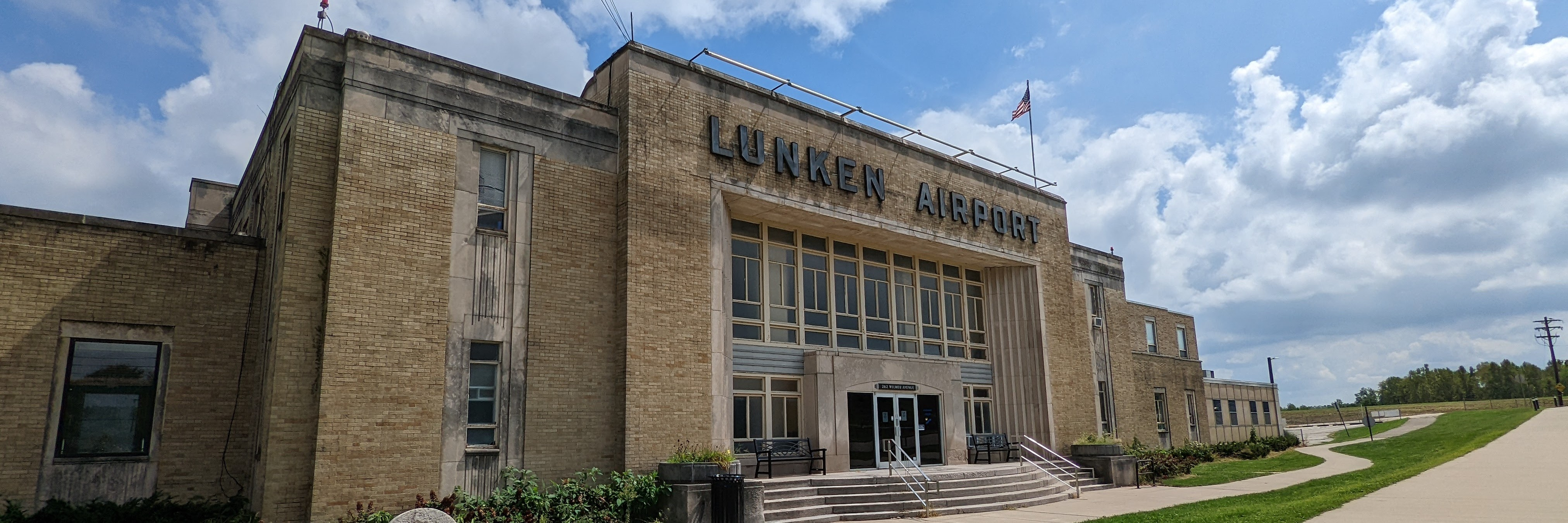
Lunken Airport's main building

Cincinnati Municipal Airport (Lunken Airport) was Cincinnati's main airport until 1947. It is in the Little Miami River valley near Columbia, the site of the first Cincinnati-area settlement in 1788. John Dixon “Dixie” Davis began giving flying lessons at the field in 1921 and the field was originally named the Dixie Davis Flying Field. The 1,000-acre (400 ha) airfield had become the largest municipal airfield in the world by 1925 when the airport was named for Eshelby Lunken, whose father, Edmund H. Lunken, ran the Lunkenheimer Valve Company. (The family's last name had been shortened from its original "Lunkenheimer" spelling.)

The first aviation related activities in the area were flying lessons offered by John "Dixie" Dixon Davis around 1921. The flights took place just north of the airport, roughly where the Lunken Playfield is today.

On December 17, 1925, the Embry-Riddle Company was formed at Lunken Airport by T. Higbee Embry and John Paul Riddle. A few years later the company moved to Florida, and later became the Embry-Riddle Aeronautical University. In 1928, the T. E. Halpin Development Co, later the Metal Aircraft Corporation, produced 22 of the high-wing Flamingo at the airport. Also in 1928, Aeronca Aircraft Corporation was formed to build cheap light aircraft; the factory building, hangar 4, is still in use. Over 500 C-2 and C-3 aircraft were built here. Airline flights began in the late 1920s; in 1938, American Airlines and Marquette Airlines were using the new $172,000 terminal building.

In the middle a weekend of festivities, the airport was formally dedicated on 27 September 1930.

During World War II, the airport served first as the headquarters of the I Concentration Command, before being transferred to the Air Transport Command.

Lunken Airport was supplanted by the Cincinnati/Northern Kentucky International Airport after flooding from the Ohio River and introduction of larger aircraft that needed longer runways. The flooding prompted the airport's nickname of "Sunken Lunken". (Note: The airport was also threatened or damaged by flooding in March 1933 and March 1945.) During the Ohio River flood of 1937, the airfield and two-story main terminal building at the southwest corner of the airport were submerged, except for the third-floor air traffic control "tower". A plaque (which appears from ground level to be a single black brick) on the terminal building, facing the airfield, indicates the high-water mark. The airport flooded again in 1945 and 1948. However, the latter was not before the soon-to-be U.S. Air Force vacated the field in 1947. As early as 1948 and continuing to at least 1966, the Greater Cincinnati Airmen's Club held an annual cross country air race at the airport. In the early 1960s Conrad International Corporation, which upgraded Beechcraft 18s, was located at the airport. In 1962, Wilmer Avenue, the western border of the airport, was moved westward. (Note: Wilmer Road originally only referred to the section northeast of Airport Road, but the name was applied to the remaining portion, previously called Turkey Bottom Road, in 1927.) The next year, the layout of the golf course to the north was changed to provide additional room for a runway. At the same time, Midwest Airways announced it would begin offering scheduled service out of Lunken, becoming the first airline to do so since 1947. (Note: It had previously provided non-scheduled service since 1959.) In 1964, a new control tower was also completed and a wing added to the terminal building. That same year, the FAA designated the airport as a general reliever airport. As business jet travel expanded, the 6,100-foot parallel runway 2R was added about 1965 (requiring relocation of the Little Miami River). (Note: The work also included raising the levee along the river to 71 feet.) In 1967, its name was officially changed from "Lunken Field" to "Lunken Airport". The Ohio Aerospace Expo was held at the airport in 1978. By that time, airport leadership began contemplating a greater focus on corporate aviation. Ten years later, Lunken was "believed to rank third in the United States [...] in the number of business jets based at a general aviation reliever airport."

In April 2004, Flamingo Air sought a permit from the city to operate a commuter airline service. However, significant negative reaction from the local community resulted in the airport manager being fired and the possibility of future airline service banned. However, as a compromise for the corporate aviation based there, the city approved the lengthening of the runway to 7,000-foot (2,100 m).

Today the old control tower is home to the Lunken Cadet Squadron of the Civil Air Patrol, and is the oldest standing control tower in the United States. The property also contains public recreation areas, including an 18-hole golf course, playgrounds, and walking/biking paths on the levee surrounding the airfield. In 2009 Ultimate Air Shuttle began operations at Lunken with a flight to Chicago–Midway, and has since expanded to four cities, including Chicago, New York, Charlotte, and Cleveland. Currently, many Cincinnati-area companies base their aircraft at the airport due to its proximity to downtown Cincinnati, but most airlines use Cincinnati/Northern Kentucky International Airport. Various proposals have taken place to add air service to the airport, including by Allegiant Air, which started operations at CVG instead, and Flamingo Air, which did not happen.

The city was informed by FEMA in 2007 that the 5-mile (8.0 km) long levee protecting the airport from flooding was too short for federal standards and would be decertified. Following claims in 2014 that the city hid this from affected residents, it countered that it held an open house at the time and had attempted to solicit a federal grant for repairs in 2009.

A proposal to demolish 45 to 60 t-hangars and replace them with a corporate hangar was called off in 2018 after opposition from local pilots and the AOPA. The same year, a fixed-base operator called Waypoint Aviation began operations out of a new 40,000-square-foot (3,700 m^{2}) hangar at the airport.

In 2021, the Mutual UFO Network announced that it was moving to the airport from California. A report released in 2024 noted that Lunken was operating at half capacity and suggested that the city should lease it to Cincinnati/Northern Kentucky International Airport. Concurrently, the new airport manager moved forward with plans for a new customs office, the closure of runway 3L/21R and the removal of an old hangar. The following year, it was announced that planning had begun to potentially install equipment for electric aircraft at the airport.

Plans to demolish Hangar 3 were announced in April 2026.

=== Notable visitors ===
From 1971 to 1979, Neil Armstrong was an Aerospace Engineering professor at the University of Cincinnati. He would take students to Lunken Airport to teach them about aviation.

In 1927, Charles Lindbergh landed at Lunken and was mobbed by well-wishers. In 1964 a large crowd of fans greeted The Beatles as they flew into and out of Lunken for their concert at Cincinnati Gardens.

Several U.S. presidents and other dignitaries have arrived at Lunken. On October 30, 2007, Air Force One landed at Lunken as President George W. Bush visited the abutting Cincinnati neighborhood of Hyde Park for a fundraiser for Republican Congressman Steve Chabot. On October 22, 2008, Republican presidential candidate Arizona Senator John McCain and vice-presidential candidate Governor of Alaska Sarah Palin spoke to a crowd of 12,000 in hangar A-10. Gretchen Wilson performed to start the rally. Cindy McCain and Todd Palin were also in attendance. Introducing them was former Republican Congressman (later US Senator) Rob Portman. In 2011, the airport served as a backdrop for scenes in the film The Ides of March. A Learjet carrying Jim Obergefell and John Arthur took off from the airport on 11 July 2013. As same-sex marriage was not legal in Ohio, it landed in Baltimore, where the two were wed in the jet, before returning the same day. On February 5, 2018, a Boeing C-32 flying as Air Force One landed at Lunken bringing President Donald Trump for an address to the employees of Sheffer Corporation in nearby Blue Ash.

=== Sky Galley Restaurant ===
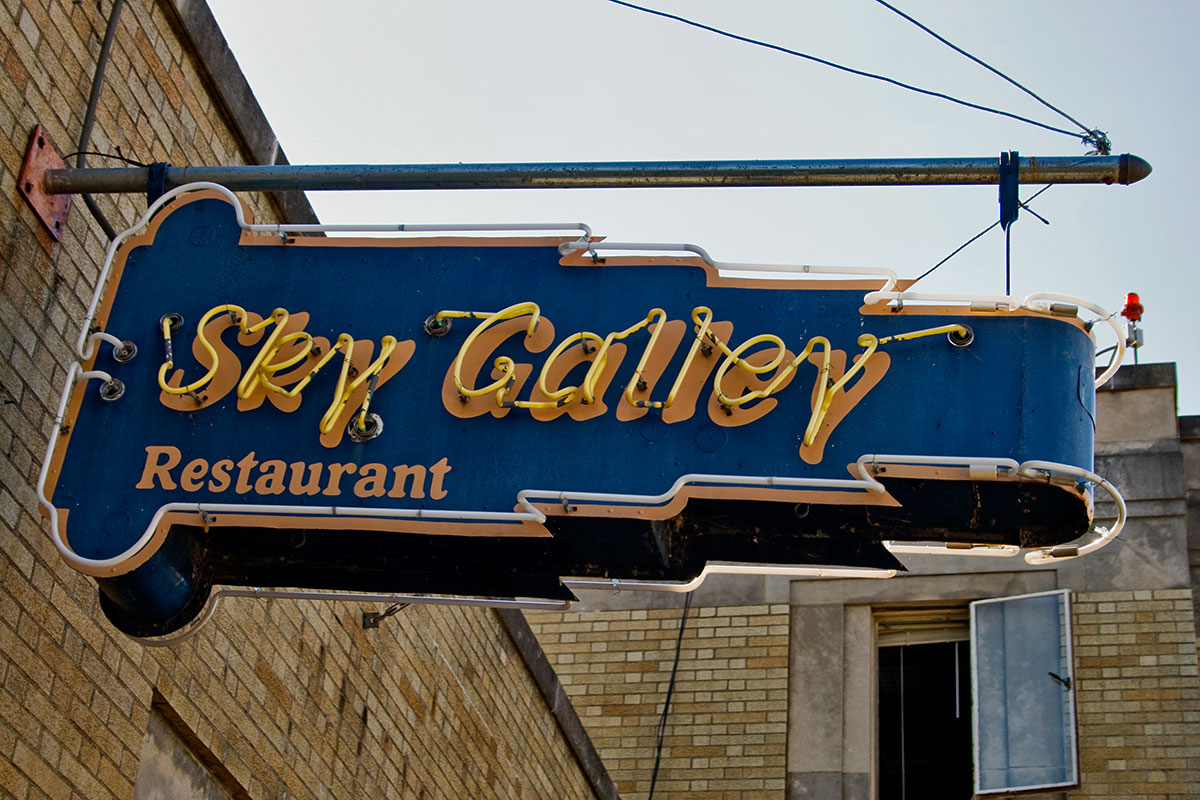
The Sky Galley Restaurant sign at Lunken Airport.

The Sky Galley restaurant was in nearly continuous operation for decades, and is so named because some of the first meals served on a commercial airliner (American Airlines) were prepared here. The Sky Galley is housed in the terminal building and has large windows and a patio dining area facing the airfield, allowing views of small aircraft and corporate jets taking off and landing. Formerly known as the Wings Restaurant, it was reopened in 1999 as the Sky Galley. In 2019, the lease agreement for the restaurant was nearly cancelled by the city due to potential food safety risks reported by the Health Department. After an online petition on change.org gained over 17,000 signatures, an agreement was reached in which the city would provide up to $100,000 to help renovate the restaurant and grant it another 5-year lease if the owner committed to correcting the violations. However, due to the effects of COVID-19, the Sky Galley was forced to close in September 2020. A proposal to replace it with a new restaurant and hotel was made in March 2021. In December, the Cincinnati city council approved a multi-decade lease for the building to the developer vR Group. After a delay of a few years, the renovation of the terminal was announced to begin in summer 2025. Work began in January 2026 and a formal groundbreaking was held in May.

== Facilities ==
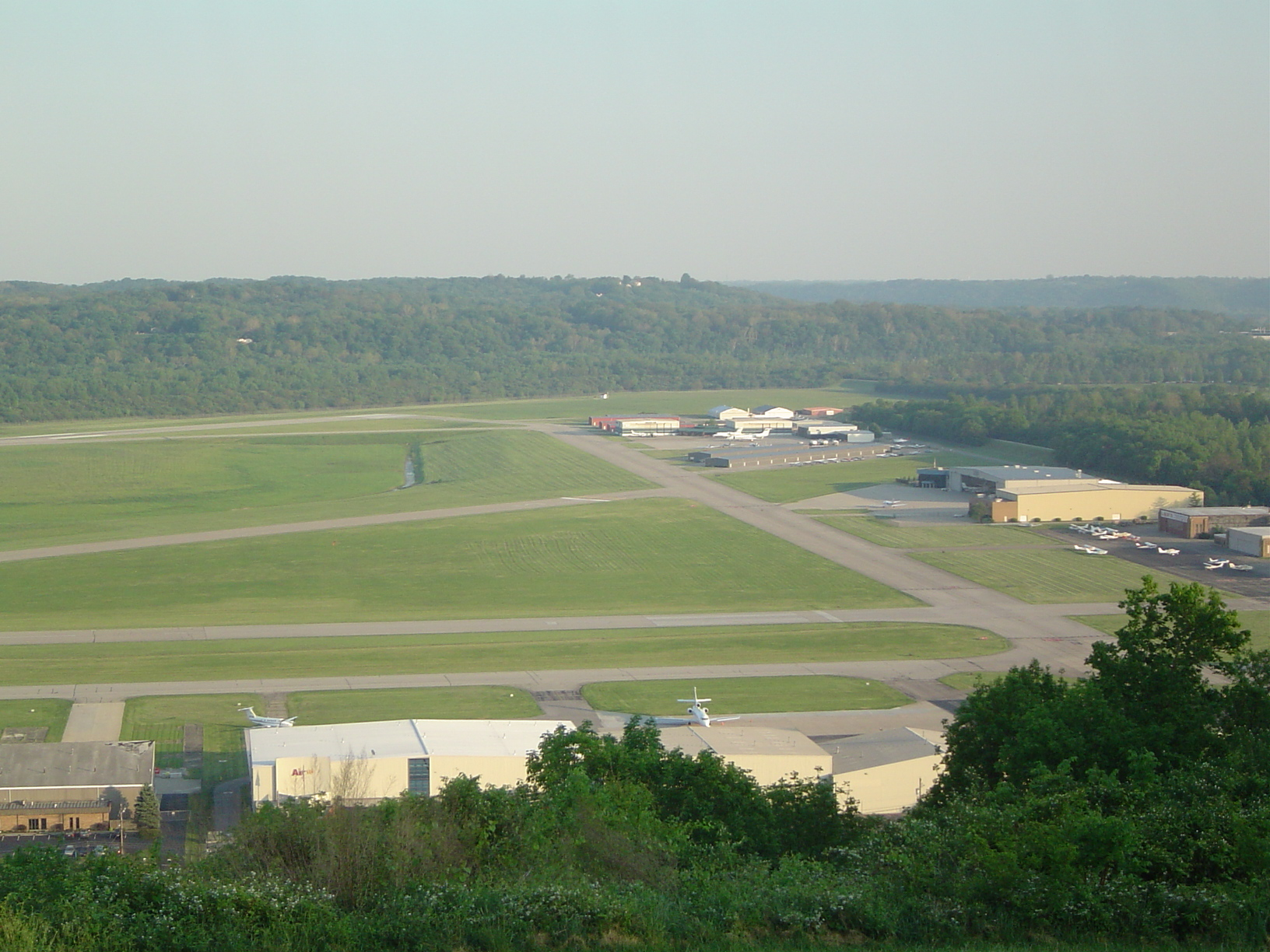
Lunken Airport from Alms Park

Cincinnati Municipal Airport – Lunken Field covers 1,140 acres (460 ha) and had three runways until July 1, 2024 when 3L/21R was permanently closed and decommissioned :

- 3L/21R (now closed): 3,801 x 100 ft (1,159 x 30 m), surface: asphalt
- 3R/21L: 6,101 x 150 ft (1,860 x 46 m), surface: asphalt
- 7/25: 5,127 x 100 ft (1,563 x 30 m), surface: asphalt

Thirty-eight T-hangars were built on the airport in 2001.

A 63,000 sq ft (5,900 m^{2}) hangar for Procter & Gamble is located on the north side of the airport.

The terminal building has two floors and is home to one of the oldest air traffic control towers in the United States. A small pilot supply shop called The Flight Depot is located on the first floor and the Cincinnati Aviation Heritage Society & Museum is on the second.

A bicycle path around the perimeter of the airport, which includes a portion on top of the flood levees, connects to the Little Miami Scenic Trail. (Note: The first bike trail at the airport was built by the WPA in the 1930s.) The 185-acre (75 ha) Lunken Playfield is located near the airport. The Reeves Golf Course, named for past Cincinnati Recreation Commission head Will R. Reeves, has been adjacent to the airport since the former was dedicated in mid 1955.

== Public charter and destinations ==
NetJets also has a facility in Cincinnati.

== Statistics ==
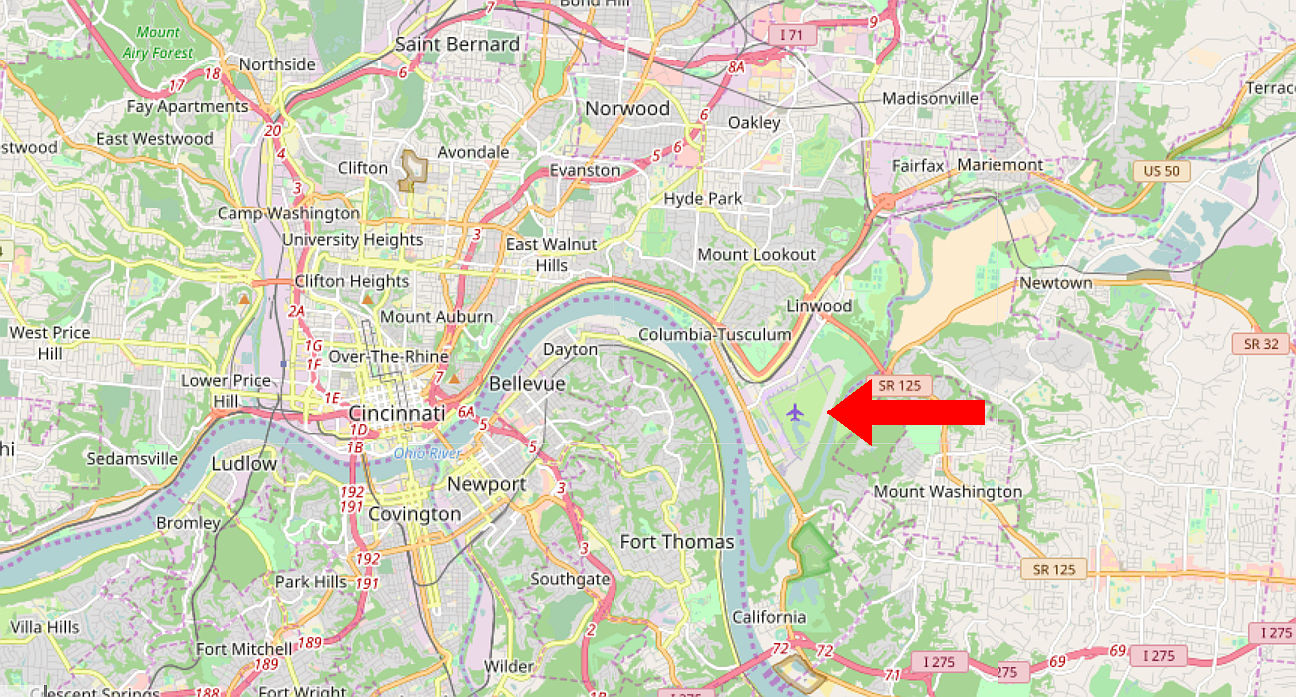
Location within Cincinnati

For the 12-month period ending December 31, 2022, the airport had 114,630 aircraft operations, an average of 314 per day: 89% general aviation, 11% air taxi, <1% military and <1% scheduled commercial. In the year ending December 31, 2022, 150 aircraft were based at this airport: 76 single-engine, 55 jet, 12 multi-engine, 3 helicopter, and 4 gliders.

=== Top destinations (October 2016 – September 2017) ===
Rank	City	Passengers	Carriers
1	Cleveland, Ohio	7,820	Ultimate Air Shuttle
2	Chicago–Midway, Illinois	5,970	Ultimate Air Shuttle
3	Morristown, New Jersey	4,530	Ultimate Air Shuttle
4	Charlotte, North Carolina	4,070	Ultimate Air Shuttle
5	Atlanta, Georgia	1,030	Ultimate Air Shuttle

=== Total passengers ===
Year	Total passengers	% Change
1929	8,528	Steady
2005	451	Steady
2006	729	▲161.6%
2007	636	▼ -12.8%
2008	2,039	▲320.5%
2009	0	▼
2010	0	Steady
2011	0	Steady
2012	27	▲
2013	0	▼
2014	24,490	▲
2015	31,750	▲29.6%
2016	49,530	▲56.0%
2017	52,000	▲5.0%

== Accidents and incidents ==
- On 26 April 1925, a Curtiss JNS-1 crashed into the Ohio River due to engine failure after taking off from the airport.
- On 28 February 1928, a Douglas O-2C crashed while taking off from the airport.
- On 8 August 1928, a Waco biplane crashed after taking off from the airport, killing the pilot and passenger.
- On 19 October 1929, a Consolidated PT-1 Trusty crashed near Miamiville, Ohio after taking off from the airport, injuring the two crew.
- On 21 December 1930, an airplane crashed near the airport after suffering a structural failure, killing the pilot.
- On 9 August 1931, a Ford Trimotor crashed after taking off from the airport, killing the two crew and four passengers.
- On 30 May 1932, a glider crashed at Dixie Davis Flying Field, killing the pilot.
- On 23 February 1934, a Boeing P-12D crashed while landing at the airport. It was delivering airmail.
- On 22 November 1936, a North American BT-9 crashed after taking off from the airport, killing the two pilots.
- On 5 September 1938, an unknown airplane overturned after landing, injuring the two pilots.
- On 10 March 1941, American Airlines Flight 20, a Douglas DC-3 crashed into a dike while landing at the airport, injuring two crew and three passengers.
- On 9 August 1942, a Culver Cadet crashed in Covington, Kentucky after taking off from the airport, killing the pilot and a passenger. The airplane had been stunting before the crash, the pilot had previously washed out of the Civilian Pilot Training Program for, among other reasons, poor judgement and he was due to report to training for military glider training in eight days.
- On 12 August 1942, an unknown light plane crashed while attempting to land at the airport, injuring the pilot.
- On 13 August 1942, a North American AT-6 Texan made an emergency landing near Newtown, Ohio, after taking off from the airport.
- On 9 January 1943, a Boeing PT-17 Kaydet made an emergency landing near Anderson Ferry after taking off from the airport.
- On 14 August 1943, a Lockheed C-60A Lodestar overran the runway and damaged a fence.
- On 25 August 1943, an unknown Navy monoplane made an emergency landing near the airport. (Note: The previous week two false reports of aircraft accidents had been reported to the fire department.)
- On 31 August 1943, an unknown cabin airplane crashed near the airport.
- On 15 October 1943, a Curtiss P-40L Warhawk made a gear-up landing at the airport.
- On 4 November 1943, a North American P-51B Mustang crashed in Forestville, Ohio, after taking off from the airport, killing the pilot.
- On 10 November 1943, a Consolidated B-24J Liberator was damaged when its right main landing gear collapsed on landing at the airport.
- On 22 March 1944, an Aeronca Chief with the Civil Air Patrol made an emergency landing near Newtown, Ohio after taking off from the airport.
- On 30 June 1944, a Douglas C-47A Skytrain made an emergency landing near Newtown, Ohio after taking off from the airport. (Note: This is not to be confused with the emergency landing of another C-47A near Newtown on 15 April 1944.)
- On 9 October 1944, a Lockheed RA-29 was destroyed in an emergency landing at the airport.
- On 26 December 1944, a North American F-10 Mitchell crashed while taking off from the airport, killing three and injuring six.
- On 10 January 1945, a Curtiss SB2C Helldiver crashed near Newport, Kentucky after taking off from the airport, killing the passenger. The pilot bailed out after the engine stopped, but despite being believed to have made an attempt to exit the airplane the passenger was unable to do so.
- On 11 June 1945, an unknown airplane crashed in Fort Thomas, Kentucky after taking off from the airport, injuring the pilot and three passengers.
- On 12 August 1945, an unknown airplane, owned by a flying club at the airport, made an emergency landing at the nearby River Downs Racetrack.
- On 5 January 1947, a Grumman F7F-3N Tigercat was substantially damaged in a forced landing at the airport due to bad weather.
- On 16 May 1947, a Republic Seabee crashed in Mount Washington, Ohio, while trying to land at the airport after running out of fuel.
- On 4 August 1947, a trainer plane crashed in Clermont County, Ohio, after taking off from the airport, killing the pilot.
- On 12 September 1947, an unknown two-seat aircraft crashed in Fort Thomas, Kentucky after taking off from the airport, injuring a pilot and passenger.
- On 19 June 1948, a North American P-51 Mustang crashed while attempting to take off from the airport.
- On 24 October 1957, a two-seat Bell helicopter operated by Ohio Valley Airways crashed at the airport, killing the pilot.
- On 19 February 1960, a Lockheed PV-1 Ventura belonging to Champion Paper and Fibre Company crashed in Madeira, Ohio, after taking off from the airport, killing all three on board.
- On 30 September 1960, a single-engine plane crashed near Newtown, Ohio, after taking off from the airport.
- On 20 February 1963, a North American B-25 Mitchell made an emergency landing at the airport after an engine failure.
- On 18 May 1966, a Beechcraft Bonanza crashed and burned after colliding with trees while landing at the airport, injuring the pilot.
- On 30 March 1968, a Piper PA-22 Tri-Pacer crashed on final approach to the airport when the left wing struck the ground, killing the pilot.
- On 27 July 1973, a Beechcraft Travel Air crashed after taking off from the airport, killing one passenger and injuring the pilot and two other passengers.
- On 25 October 1973, a Beechcraft Queen Air crashed into the Little Miami River after taking off from the airport, killing the pilot and a passenger and injuring an additional passenger.
- On 29 September 1979, a Sikorsky CH-54 Tarhe crashed in Loveland, Ohio, after taking off from the airport, killing the four crew.
- On 16 July 1980, a Piper PA-28-180 Cherokee crashed after taking off from the airport, injuring the four occupants.
- On 25 January 1981, an unknown airplane suffered a nose landing gear collapse, damaging it.
- On 7 April 1981, a Learjet 23 was damaged by a bird strike after taking off from the airport and forced to return for an emergency landing. The copilot was killed and the pilot seriously injured.
- On 16 December 1982, a Cessna 411 crashed into a bookstore in Montgomery, Ohio, on approach to land at the airport, killing the six people on board and injuring four more on the ground. One of those killed was Carl Johnson, who had embezzled $614,000 and was planning to lead authorities to the location of a buried portion of the money.
- On 4 September 1983, an American Champion Citabria made a forced landing in the Ohio River while attempting to land at the airport. It had been towing a banner over Riverfront Stadium that it had picked up at the airport when it suffered an engine failure.
- On 20 June 1984, a Cessna 340A crashed after taking off from the airport, killing the pilot and three passengers.
- On 25 November 1986, a Bell 206 JetRanger news helicopter belonging to WKRC (AM) crashed after taking off from a heliport just north of the airport, killing the pilot and passenger.
- On 23 July 1990, a Rutan VariEze crashed at River Downs after taking off from the airport, injuring the pilot, a passenger and two people on the ground.
- On 26 January 1994, a Beechcraft Baron crashed in Newtown, Ohio, after taking off from the airport, killing the pilot.
- On 1 November 1995, an unknown twin engine plane made an emergency landing at the airport after striking a deer on takeoff.
- On 4 August 1996, a Cessna 172M crashed at the airport while practicing landings.
- On 30 May 2006, a Cessna 210N crashed in Fort Thomas, Kentucky while attempting to land at the airport, killing the pilot.
- On 14 July 2009, a Piper Cherokee crashed near the airport while trying to land, seriously injuring the pilot.
- On 22 Saturday 2012, a Cessna 182Q crashed in Fort Thomas, Kentucky while attempting to land at the airport following a loss of engine power, injuring the pilot and a passenger.
- On 12 March 2019, a Piper Navajo crashed into a home in Madeira, Ohio while on approach to Lunken, killing the pilot. The aircraft, registered N400JM, was flying for an aerial photography and mapping company.
- On 9 January 2022, an unknown airplane made an emergency landing at the airport after suffering an engine failure.
- On 17 March 2023, a Piaggio P.180 Avanti suffered a landing gear collapse after landing at the airport.
- On 1 September 2023, a Piper PA-32-300 Cherokee Six operated by Flamingo Air crashed in Anderson Township after taking off from the airport. Three passengers were uninjured and the pilot suffered a minor injury.
- On 7 February 2026, an unknown small aircraft performed a belly landing after its landing gear failed to fully extend. There were no injuries. The accident resulted in an estimated $200,000 in damages.

== See also ==
- Cincinnati/Northern Kentucky International Airport
- Cincinnati–Blue Ash Airport
- Ohio World War II Army Airfields
- Air Transport Command
- List of airports in Ohio
