= Cedar Valley =

Cedar Valley may refer to:

== Canada ==
- Cedar Valley, Peterborough County, Ontario, a town
- Cedar Valley, Wellington County, Ontario, a hamlet in Erin, Ontario
- Cedar Valley, Regional Municipality of York, Ontario
- Cedar Valley, a community in Whitchurch-Stouffville, Ontario

== United States ==
=== Arizona ===
- Cedar Valley, Arizona, the location of Cedar, Arizona

=== Arkansas ===
- Camp Cedar Valley, formerly owned by the Eastern Arkansas Area Council of the Boy Scouts of America, located south of Viola, Arkansas. Visit Camp Cedar Valley for more information.

=== Iowa ===
- Cedar Valley, Iowa, an unincorporated community in Iowa in the Waterloo/Cedar Falls metropolitan area. Visit Grow Cedar Valley for more information about the Cedar Valley in Iowa and its communities.
- Cedar Valley Formation, a geologic formation in Iowa dating back to the Devonian period
- Cedar Valley, the region surrounding the Cedar River
- A common nickname for the Waterloo–Cedar Falls metropolitan area

=== Minnesota ===
- Cedar Valley Township, St. Louis County, Minnesota

=== Missouri ===
- Cedar Valley, Missouri, an extinct town

=== Ohio ===
- Cedar Valley, Ohio, an unincorporated community

=== Oklahoma ===
- Cedar Valley, Oklahoma, a city

=== Utah ===
- Cedar Valley (Iron County, Utah), United States, the location of Cedar City
- Cedar Valley (Utah County, Utah), United States, a valley of Utah

== Other places ==
- Cedar Valley, Antigua and Barbuda, a town

== Other uses ==
- Cedar Valley, a 2018 novel by Australian author Holly Throsby
- Cedar Valley (Cyprus), a valley in the Troodos Mountains
