= Jimmie Angel =

American aviator (1899–1956)

- Born: James Crawford Angel; August 1, 1899; Cedar Valley, Missouri, US
- Died: December 8, 1956 (aged 57); Gorgas Hospital, Balboa, Panama Canal Zone
- Occupations: Pilot, explorer
- Known for: Discovering Angel Falls, 16 November 1933

James Crawford Angel (August 1, 1899 – December 8, 1956) was an American aviator after whom Angel Falls in Venezuela, the tallest waterfall in the world, is named.

== Early life ==
James Crawford Angel was born August 1, 1899, near Cedar Valley, Missouri, the son of Glenn Davis Angel and Margaret Belle (Marshall) Angel. Because his grandfather, James Edward Angel, was living, he was called Crawford to avoid confusion in the Angel family during his younger years. He is alleged to have been in World War I, but the only certainty is that he registered for the draft on September 12, 1918. In his twenties he adopted the nickname "Jimmie" by which he was known for the rest of his life.

== Angel Falls ==
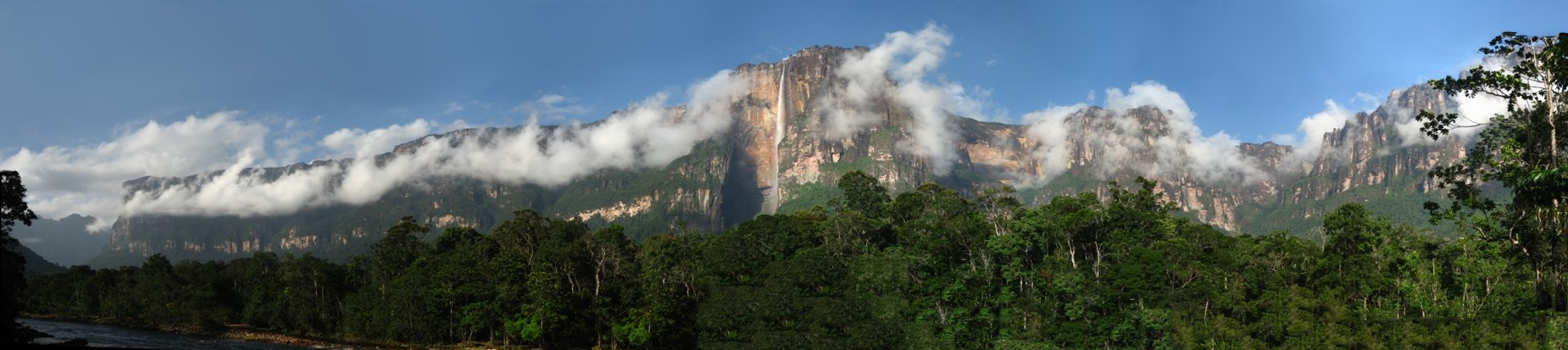
Partly clouded view of the Angel Falls named after Jimmie Angel

The falls, which cascade from the top of Auyantepui in the remote Gran Sabana region of Venezuela, were not known to the outside world until Jimmie Angel flew over them on November 16, 1933, while searching for a valuable ore bed.

On October 9, 1937, he returned to the falls with the intention of landing. On board his Flamingo monoplane were his second wife Marie, Gustavo Heny, and Miguel Delgado, Heny's gardener. He attempted a landing, but despite a successful touchdown, his aircraft El Rio Caroní nose-dived when it hit soft ground at the end of its landing run. The wheels sank in the mud, making take-off impossible.

The passengers were unharmed but had to trek across difficult terrain and with low food supplies for 11 days to make their way off the tepui and down to the nearest settlement at Kamarata. When word of their exploits got out, international interest in the Gran Sabana region increased dramatically, leading to in-depth scientific exploration in the following years.

His aircraft remained atop Auyantepui until 1970, when it was disassembled and brought down by Venezuelan military helicopters. Today, an El Rio Caroní can be seen outside the airport terminal at Ciudad Bolívar. The airplane was re-assembled in the city of Maracay's aviation museum.

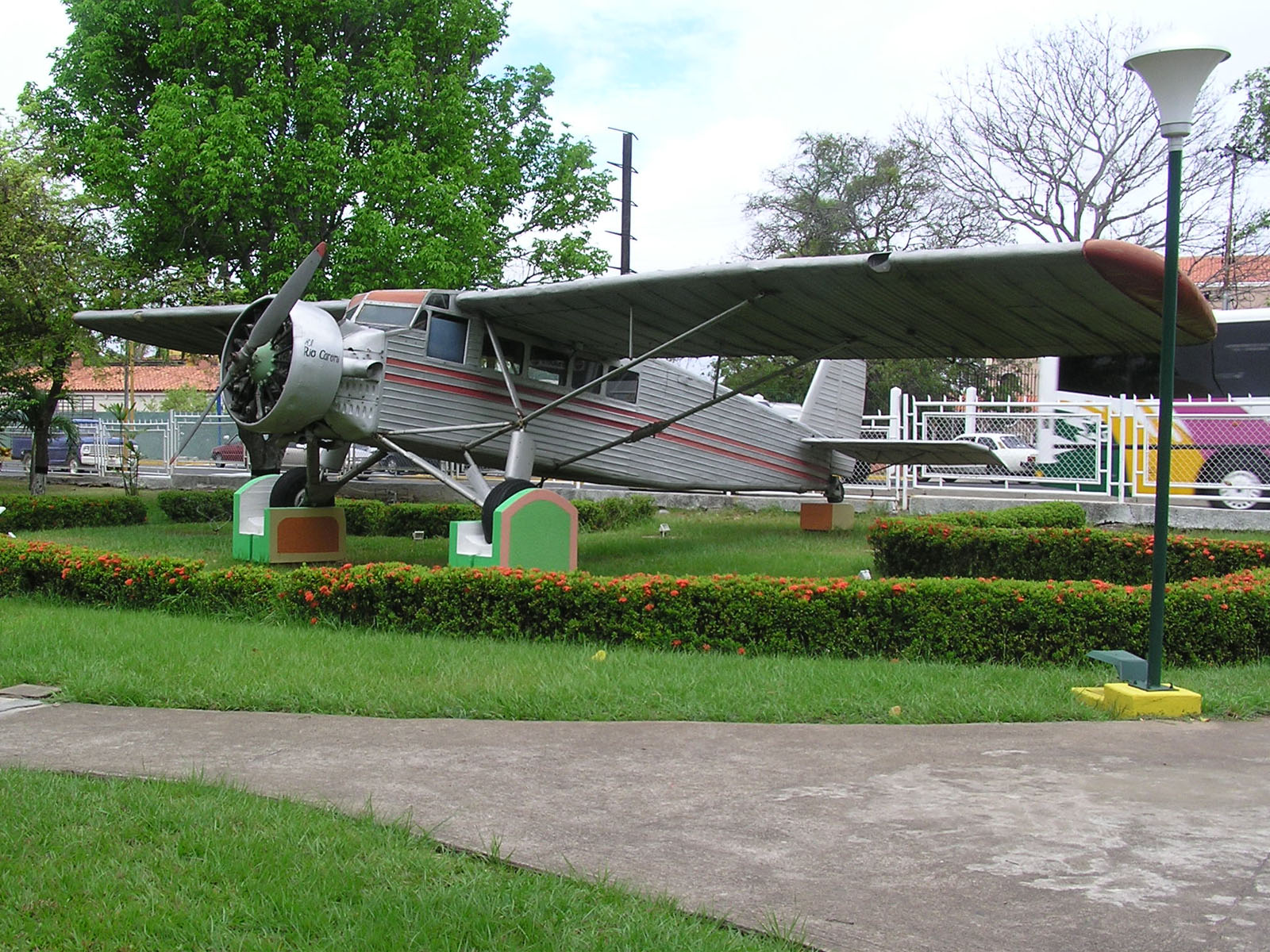
Jimmie Angel's aircraft, El Rio Caroní, exhibited in front of Ciudad Bolívar airport

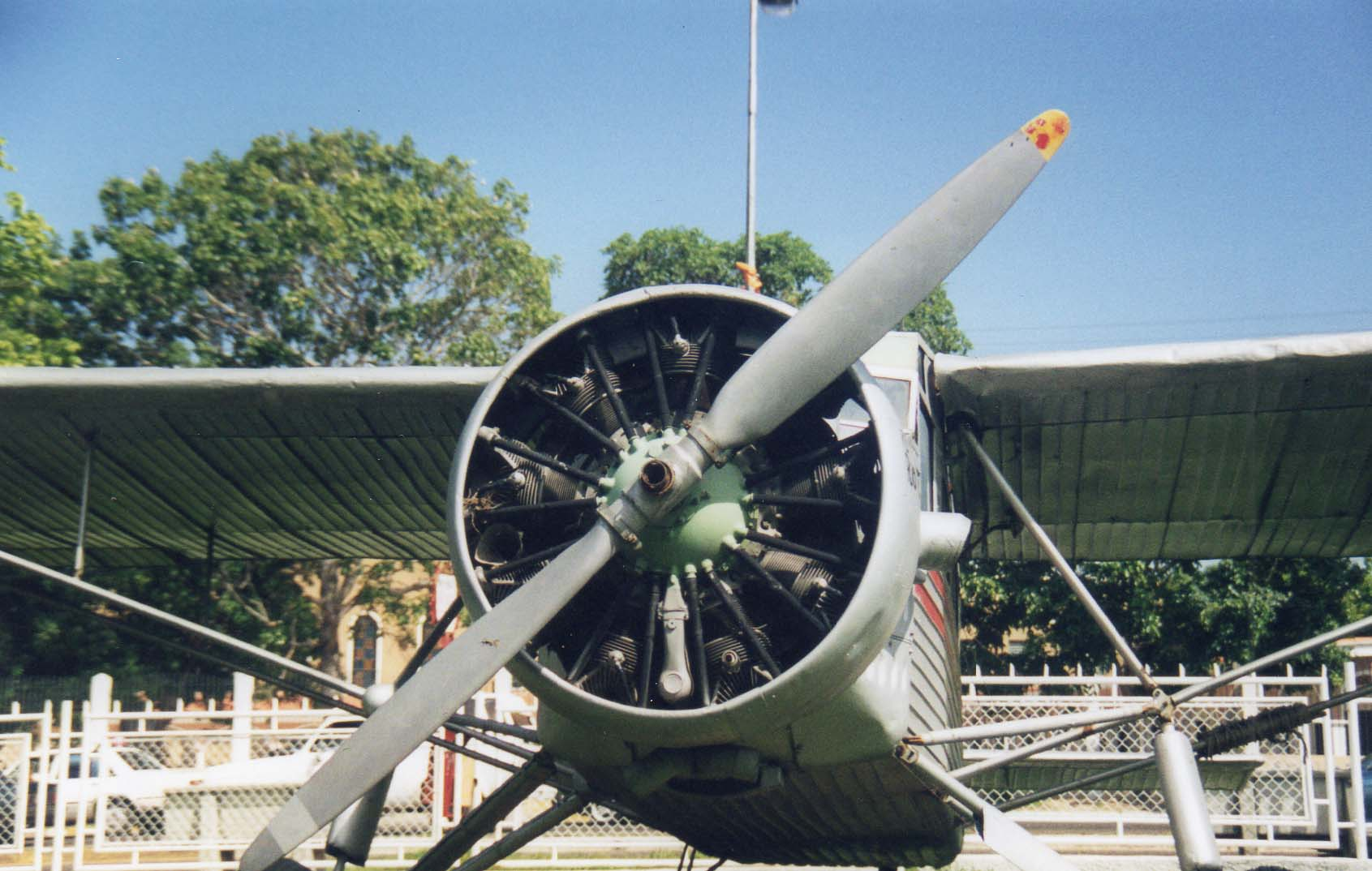
Jimmie Angel's aircraft, El Rio Caroní, exhibited in front of Ciudad Bolívar airport (front view)

== Death ==
On April 17, 1956, Angel suffered a head injury while landing his plane at David, Chiriquí, Panama. Soon afterward, he had a heart attack and then suffered from various ailments for eight months, until he came down with pneumonia and went to Gorgas Hospital in Panama City, where he died on December 8, 1956. His cremated remains were first interred at the Portal of the Folded Wings Shrine to Aviation in Burbank, California, but in keeping with his wishes, his wife, his two sons and two of his friends scattered his ashes over Angel Falls on July 2, 1960.

== Books ==
In 1997, the Italian explorer Folco Quilici wrote Cielo verde, a novel long present in the bestseller list in Italy. Inspired by the legendary figure of Jimmie Angel, Quilici created a daring and moving character, Mike Angel, fascinated by the exuberant richness and attraction of the immense virgin forest and driven by the desire to pursue a dream, always close and never trapped, in the hidden depth of that green sky of the Gran Sabana. Spanish writer Alberto Vázquez-Figueroa covered Jimmie Angel's adventures in his 1998 novel Ícaro— ISBN 9788408025023, later translated into several foreign languages. There is also another book that details how Angel Falls got its name: "Truth or Dare: The Jimmie Angel Story" written by Jan-Willem de Vries ISBN 9781419673665. In 2019, Angel's niece, Karen Angel, president of the California-based nonprofit organization the Jimmie Angel Historical Project [JAHP], published "Angel's Flight - The Life of Jimmie Angel - American Aviator-Explorer - Discoverer of Angel Falls" [ISBN 978-1-4834-8948-3]. With over two-hundred photographs, the book is the result of twenty-three years of research by her and others. Research continues by the JAHP to verify the facts of his life.
