= Aeronautics Museum of Maracay =

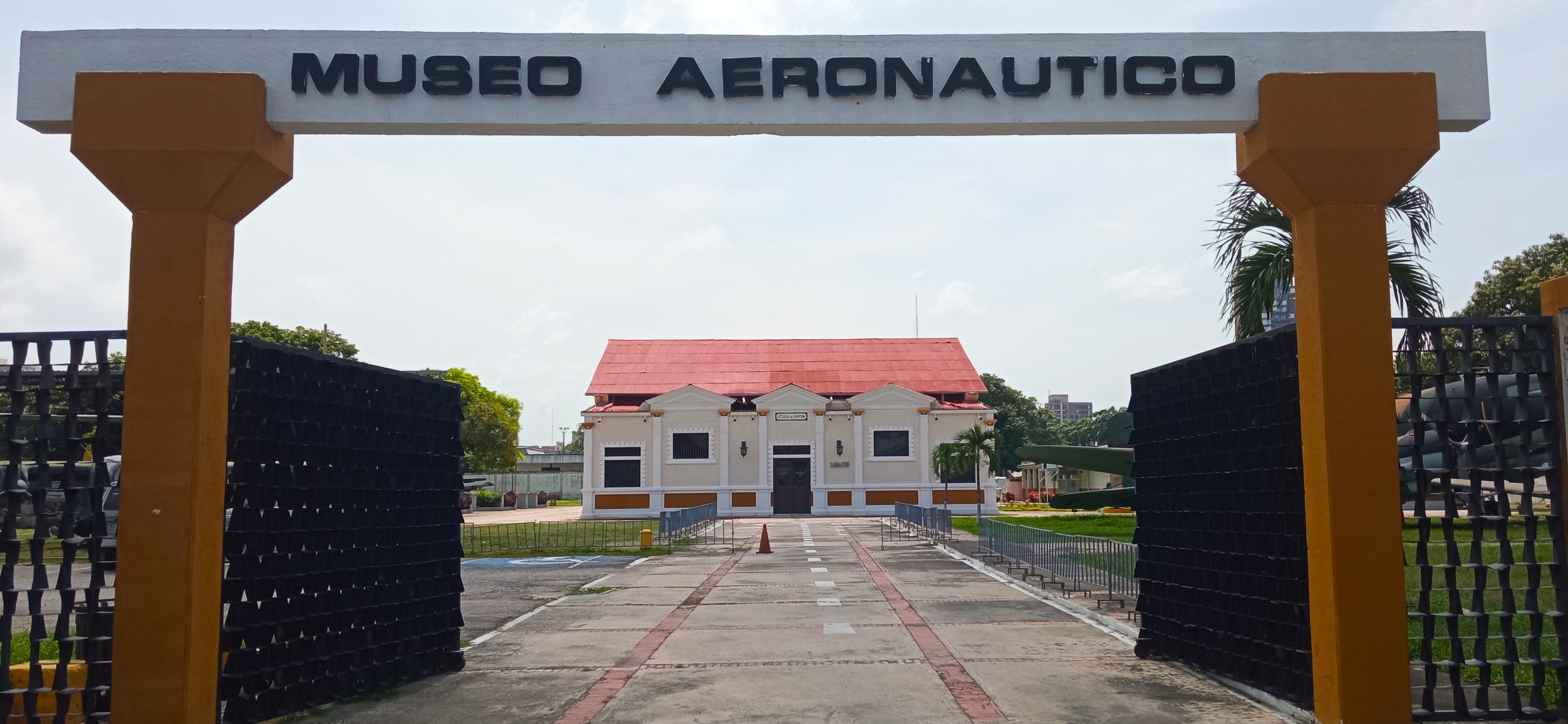
- Main entrance of the Aviation Museum of Maracay

- Location of The Aeronautics Museum of Maracay
- Location: Maracay, Venezuela
- Coordinates: 10.252944°N 67.595033°W
- Type: aviation museum
- Director: Juan Flores Blanco

Venezuelan Air Force's Museo Aeronáutico de Maracay (Aeronautics Museum of Maracay) is a historical aviation museum of military and civic aeronautic technology inaugurated on 10 December 1963 and located at the installations of the former Aeropuerto Nacional Florencio Gómez (the first airport in Maracay) adjacent to the Venezuelan Air Force officer graduation school, and the "Cradle of Venezuelan Military Aviation" in the City of Maracay, Estado Aragua, Venezuela.

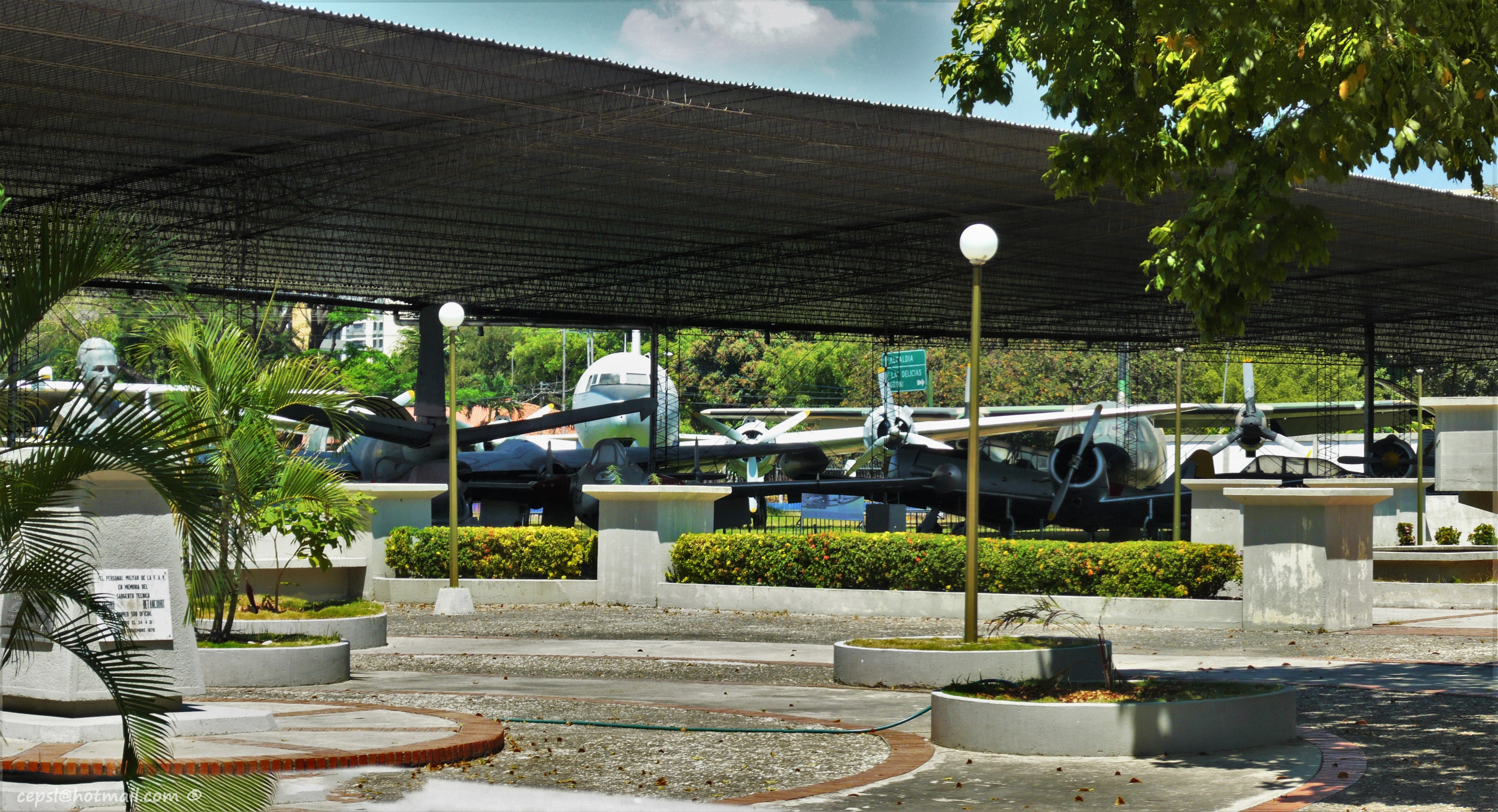
Museo Aeronáutico "Luis Hernán Paredes", Maracay

The museum is the only one of its kind in Venezuela and the largest collector and restorator of aircraft, engines, weapons, documents, photographs, maps, paintings, memorabilia and other items of historical value. The aviation museum in Maracay is one of the largest in Latin America, with over 40 aircraft on display.

== History ==
The idea of an "Aeronautical Museum" dates from 1963 when a high-ranking officer of Aeronautics, Luis Hernán Paredes, suggested its organization after the Ministry of Defense decided to move its airforce base from downtown Maracay to the outskirts of Palo Negro. The initial proposal were welcomed and immediately approved assigning the already existing hangars as the location of the museum.

The commanding General, Francisco Miliani Aranguren, designated a committee as well as technical advisors towards the end of October 1963. On 10 December 1963 Venezuelan President Rómulo Betancourt inaugurated the museum in a ceremony in situ. On 9 December 1976 a Hall of Fame was added where military memorabilia dating back to the country's independence were collected from around the country and stored in the museum.

The museum was later named after Colonel Luis Hernán Paredes, who initiated the proposal.

== Aircraft collection ==
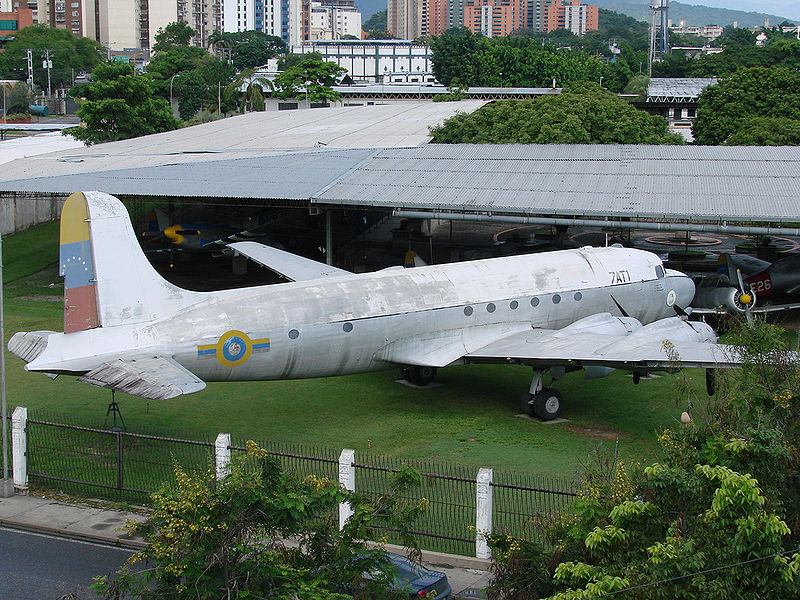
«La Vaca Sagrada» or Holy Cow, the plane that Marcos Pérez Jiménez flew escaping Venezuela in 1958.

The Aeronautics Museum in Maracay, home to the two largest Air Force bases in the country, has over 40 historical airplanes on display from different eras of Venezuelan aviation, including a replica of the Flamingo airplane "El Rio Caroni" used by Jimmie Angel during his 1937 descriptions of Angel Falls, the world's tallest waterfall discovered in 1933 by Angel, as well as the famous airplane called "La Vaca Sagrada" (Spanish for Holy Cow), used by dictator Marcos Pérez Jiménez in 1958 to flee the country to the Dominican Republic. The museum also displays a gyroplane, four historical helicopters flown by Venezuelan pilots between the 1920s and 1950s, a French made Caudron G.3 biplane from the 1910s—the first airplane owned by the Venezuelan airforce— which was reportedly restored and is currently completely operational, and a North American B-25 Mitchell type B-25J s/n 43-28096. A handful of airplanes such as a Douglas DC-3 of the 1930s piloted by Paul Vachet are on display as part of the historical era of Aeropostal, nationalized in 1934 by then president of Venezuela Juan Vicente Gómez.

=== El Río Caroní ===
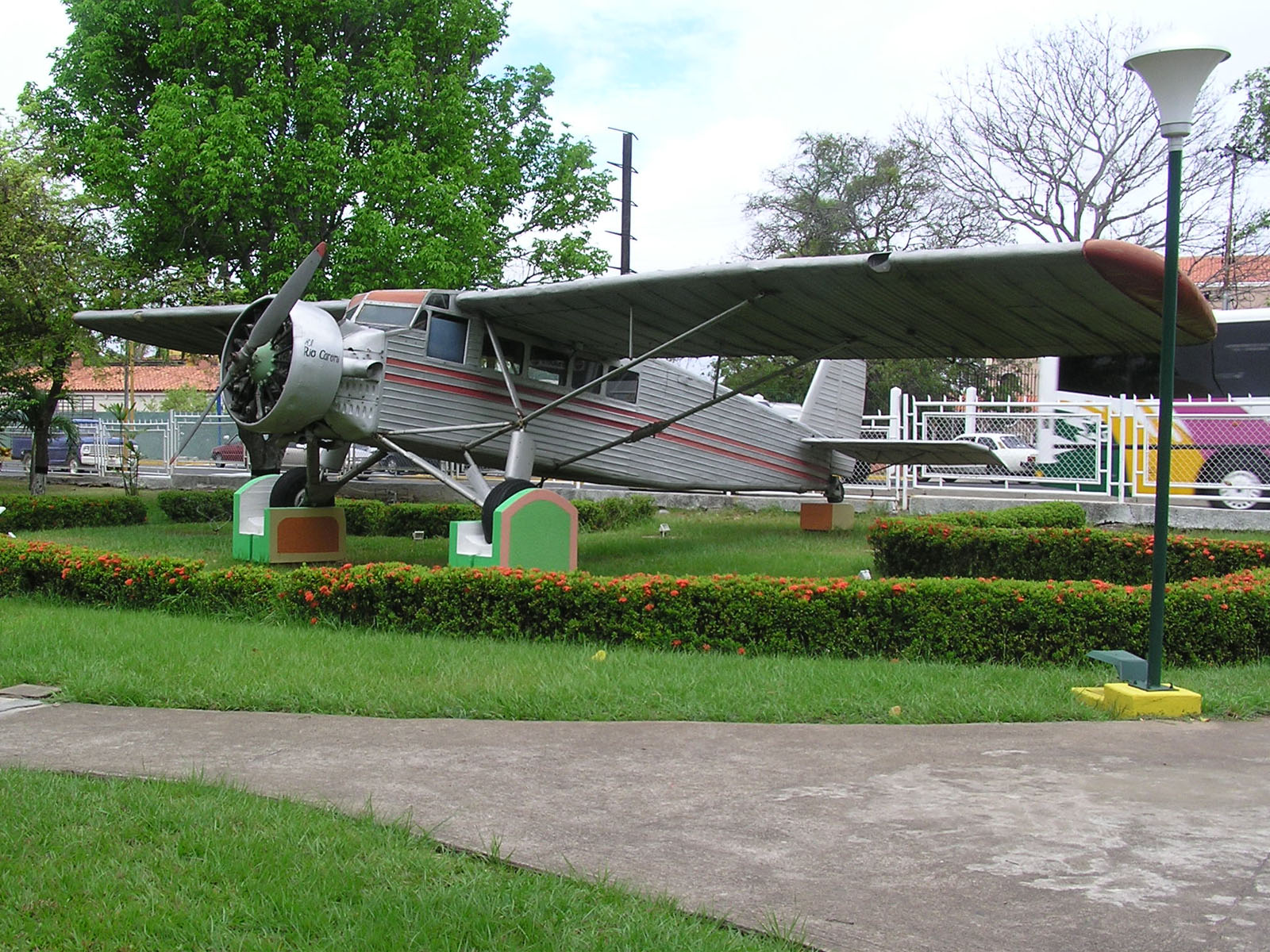
El Río Caroní on display at the Ciudad Bolívar Municipal airport.

Jimmie Angel's aircraft, El Río Caroní, landed atop of the Auyantepui on 9 October 1937 where it sustained damaged when the ship bogged down in mud. It remained on Auyantepui until 1970. None of Angel's passengers, his second wife Marie Angel, Gustavo Heny and Miquel Angel Delgado, were injured during the landing. In 1970, the Flamingo monoplane was disassembled into parts and lifted down by Venezuelan military helicopters to the aviation museum in Maracay where it was part of an aviation fair. Re-assembly of the original aircraft was especially challenging, with several parts of the craft missing after thirty years standing on the mountaintop.

The aircraft was later moved to the airport at Ciudad Bolivar where it remains displayed in front of the passenger terminal. The location and care of Angel's plane remains controversial, with sections of the Venezuelan military decidedly in favor of returning the airplane to the museum in Maracay, replacing it with a replica at Ciudad Bolivar airport.

== Gallery ==
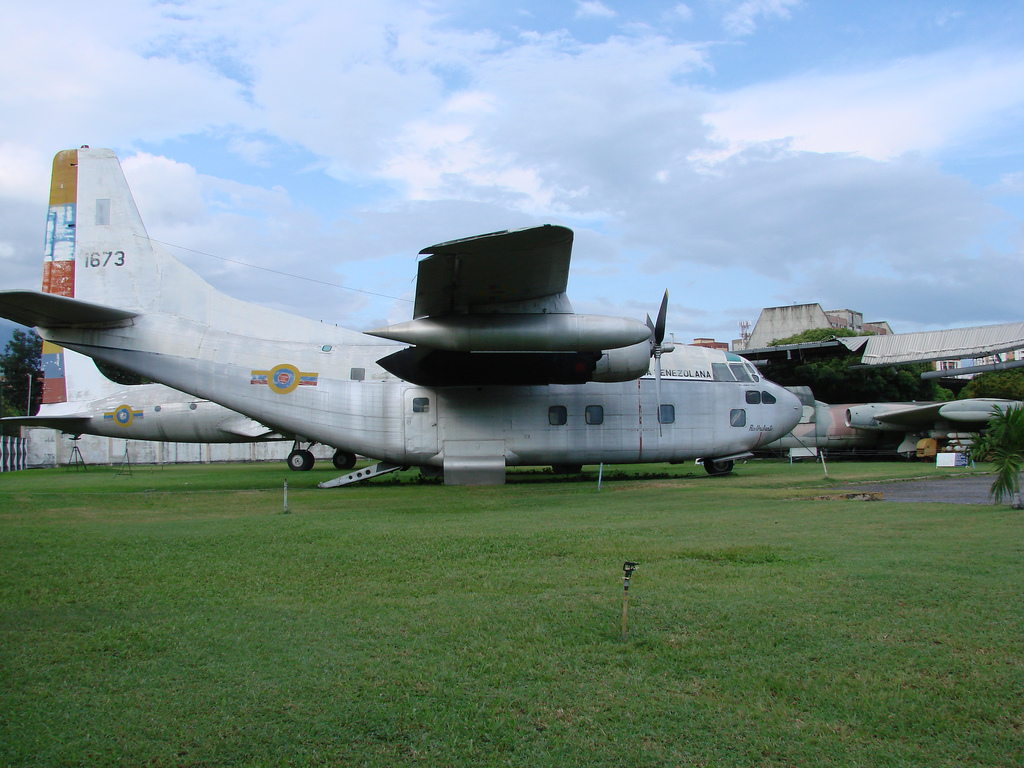
Fairchild C-123 Provider

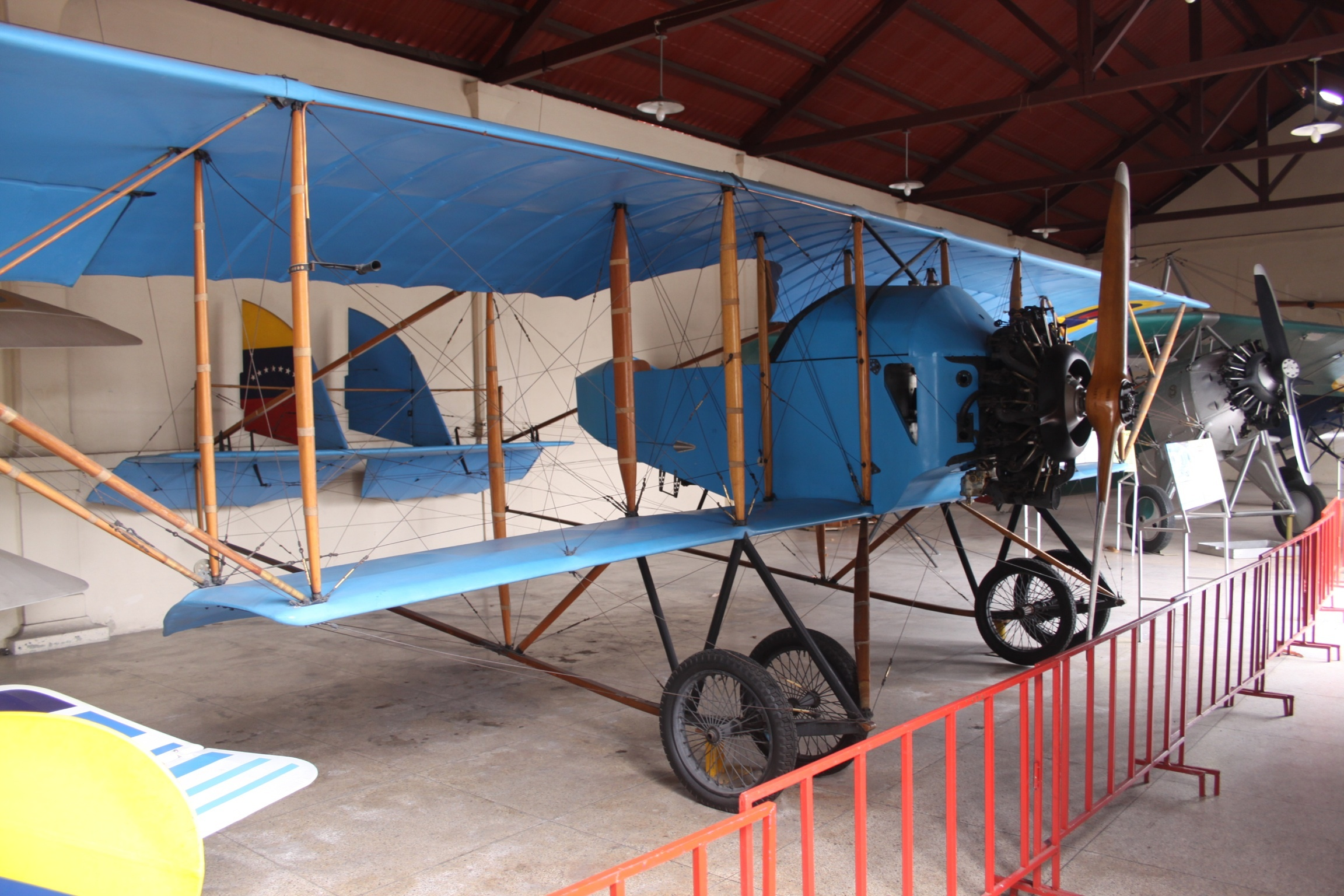
Caudron G.3

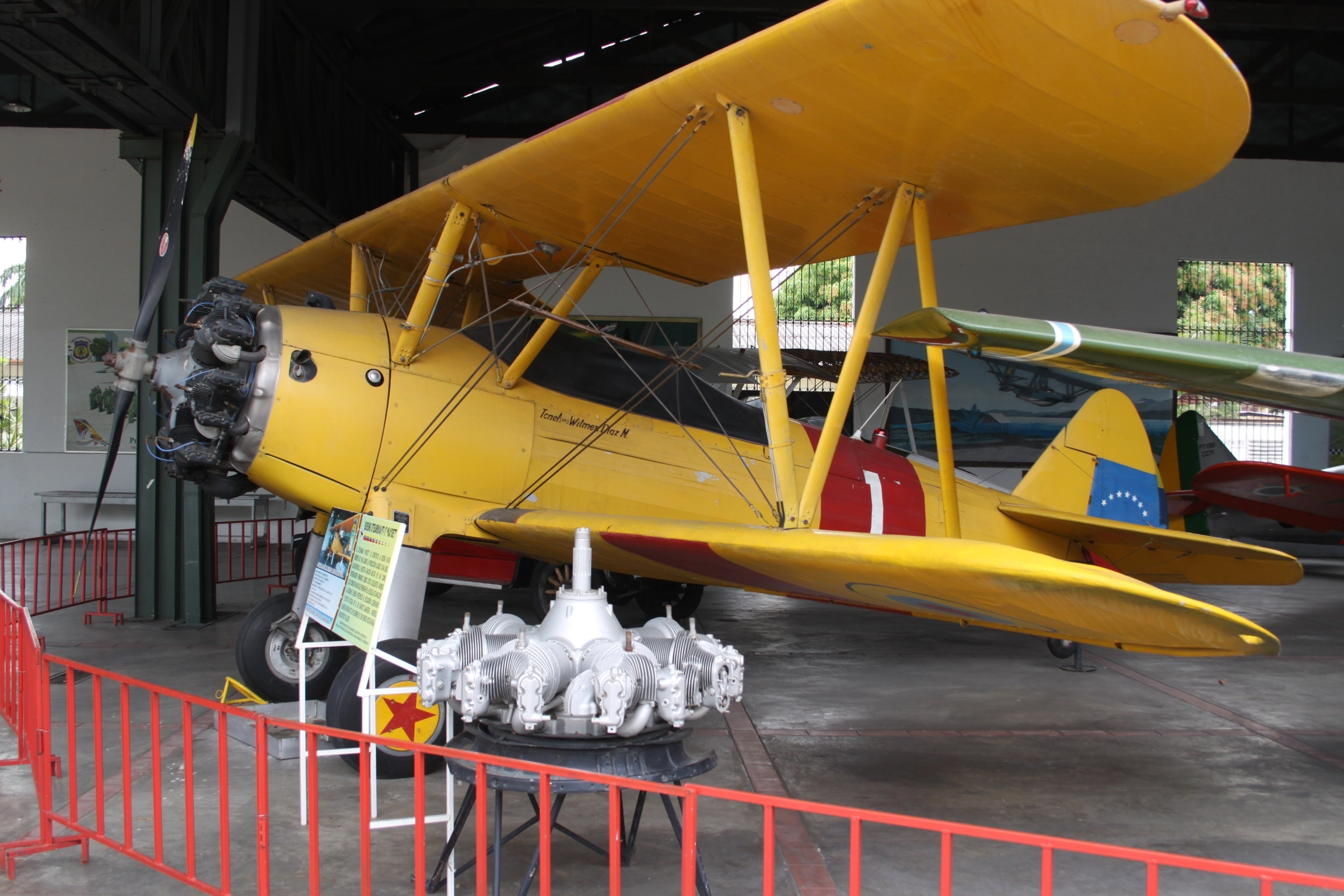
Boeing-Stearman PT-17

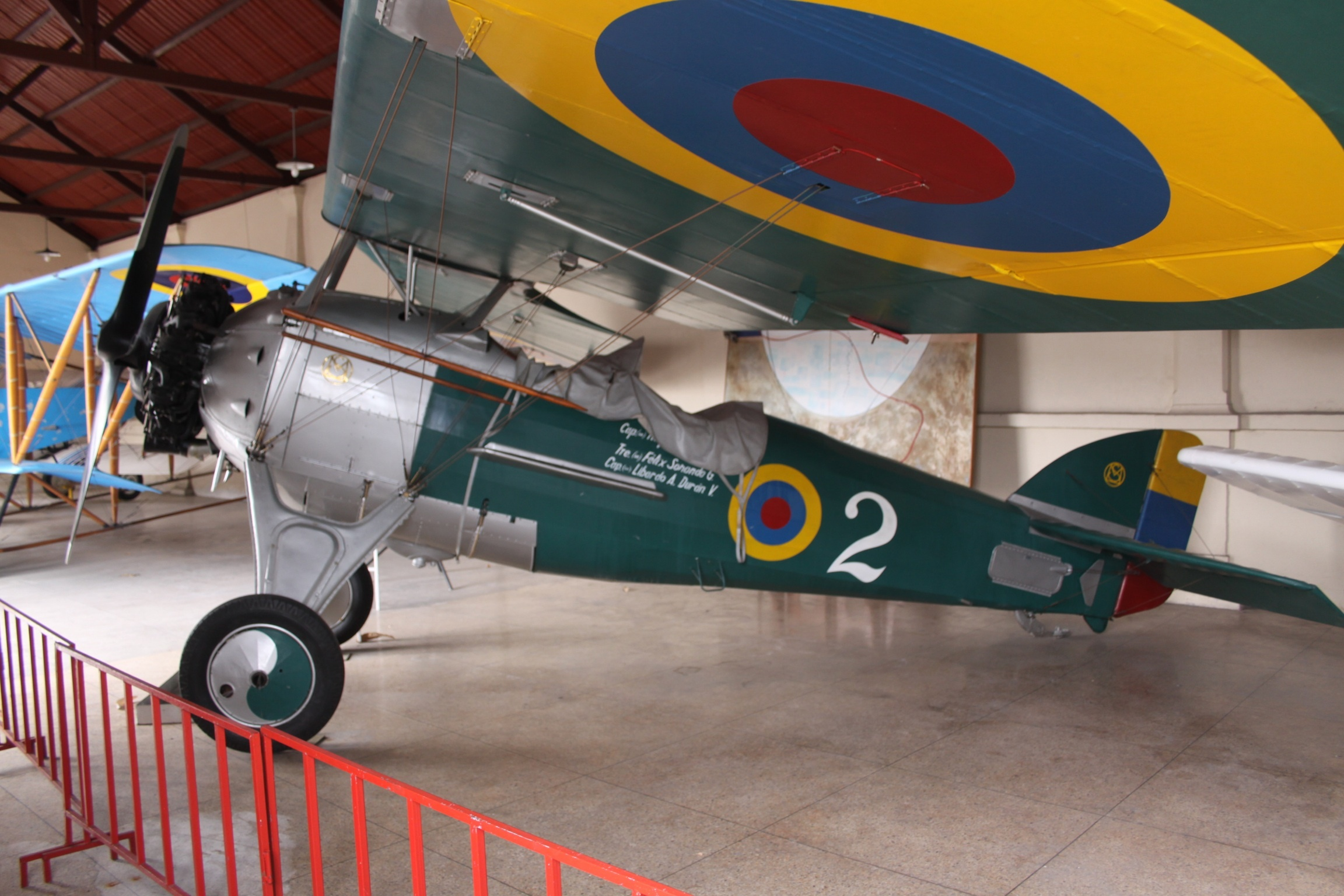
Morane-Saulnier MS.147

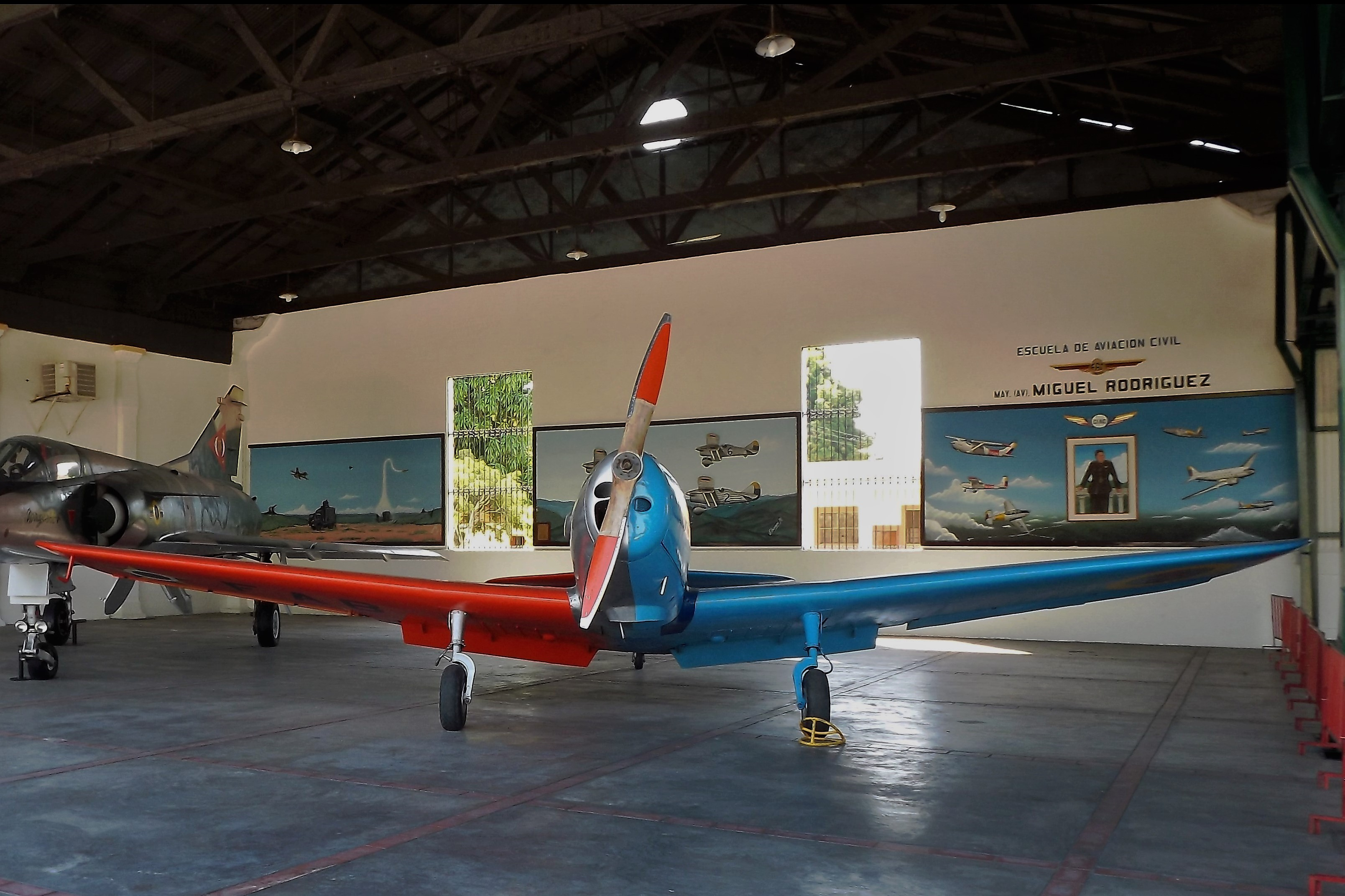
Fairchild PT-19

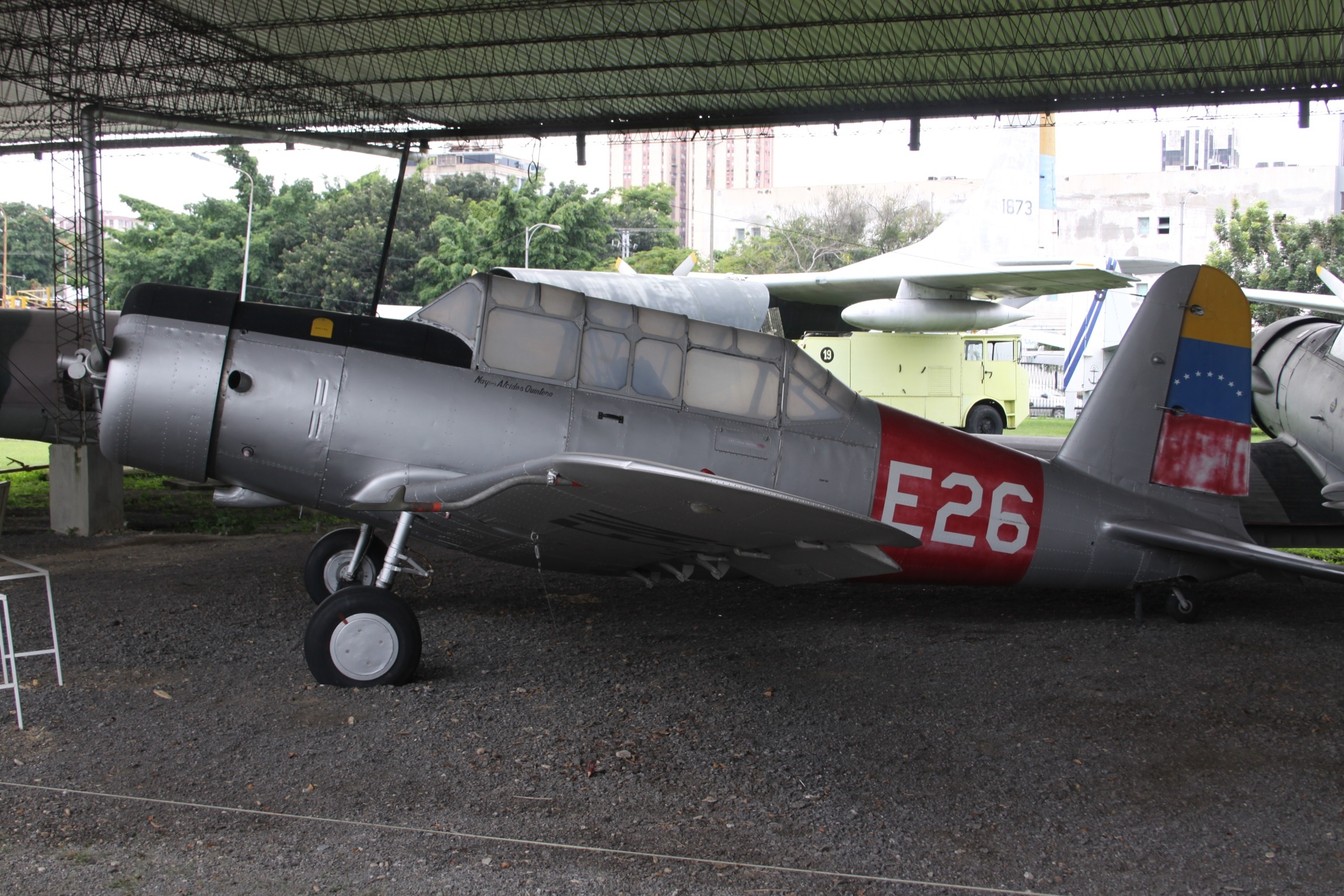
Vultee BT-15 Valiant

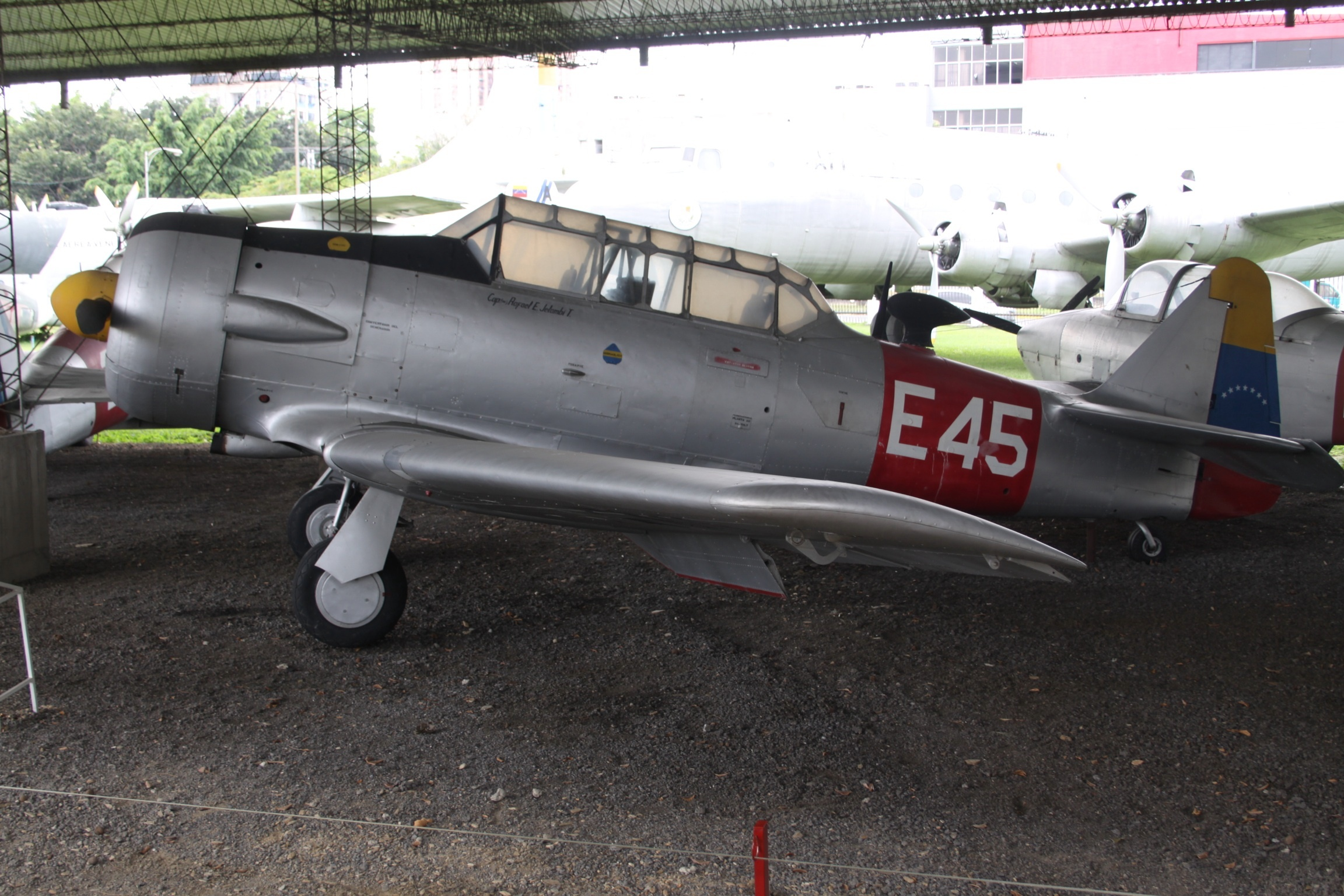
NA AT-6A Texan

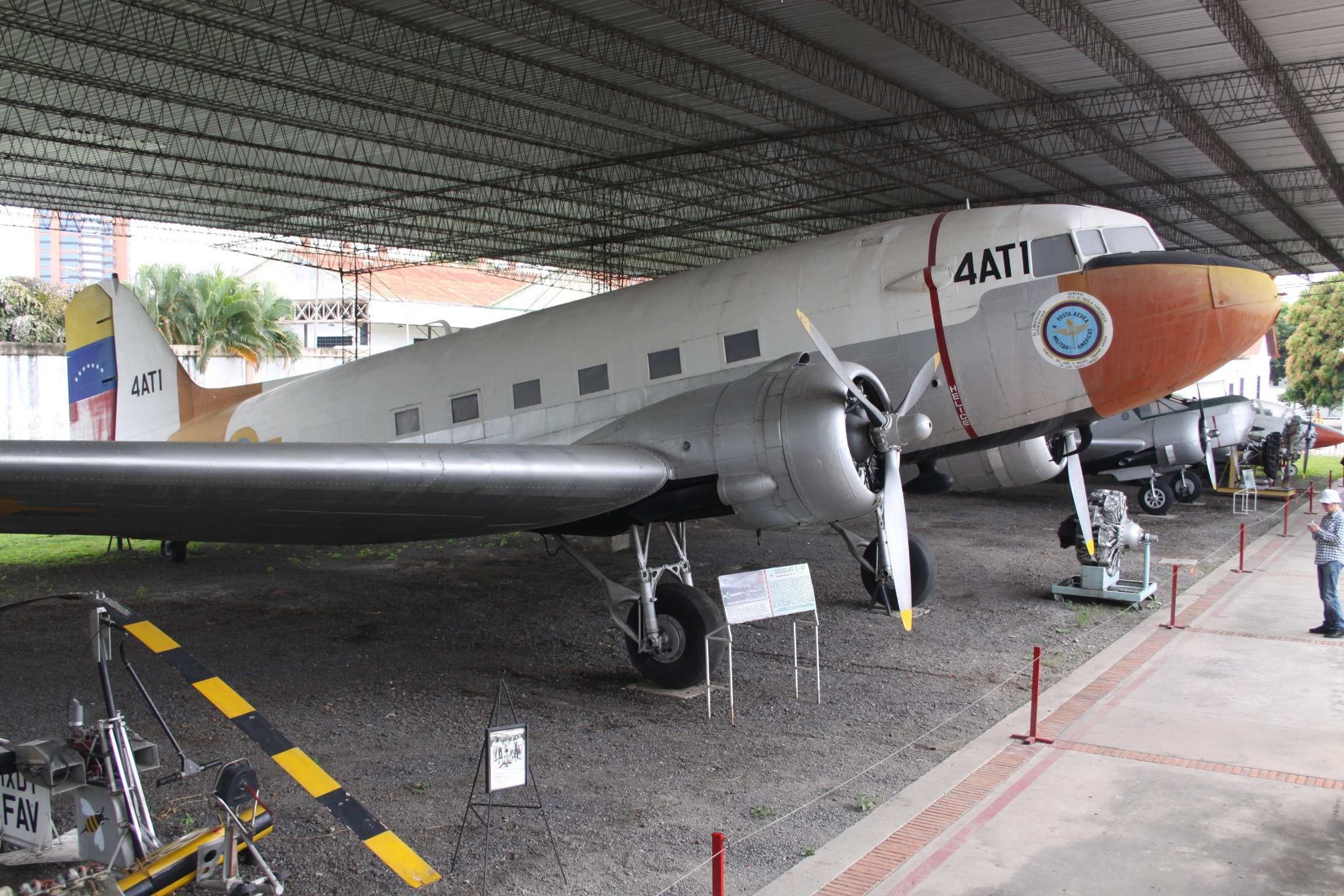
Douglas DC-3

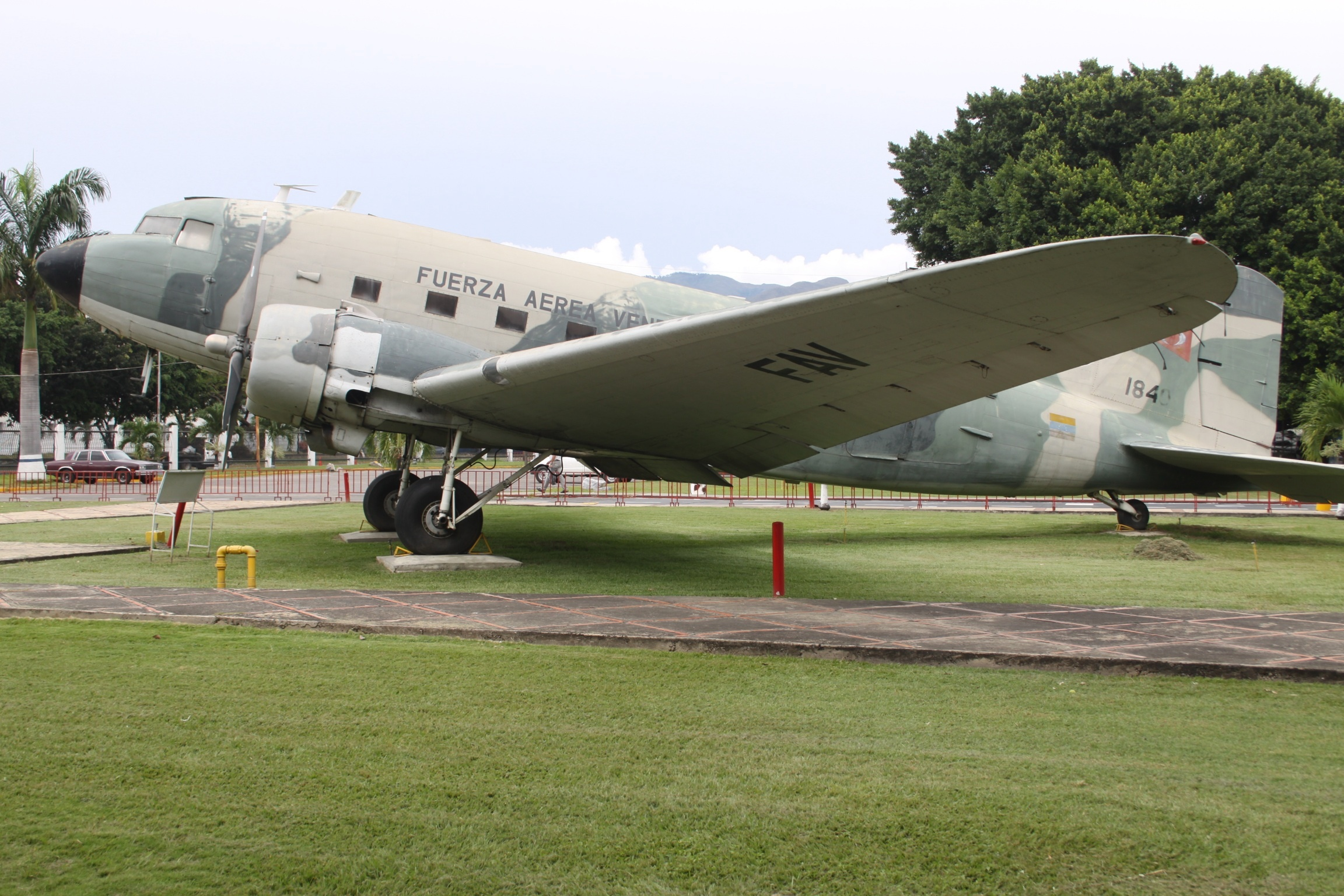
Douglas DC-3

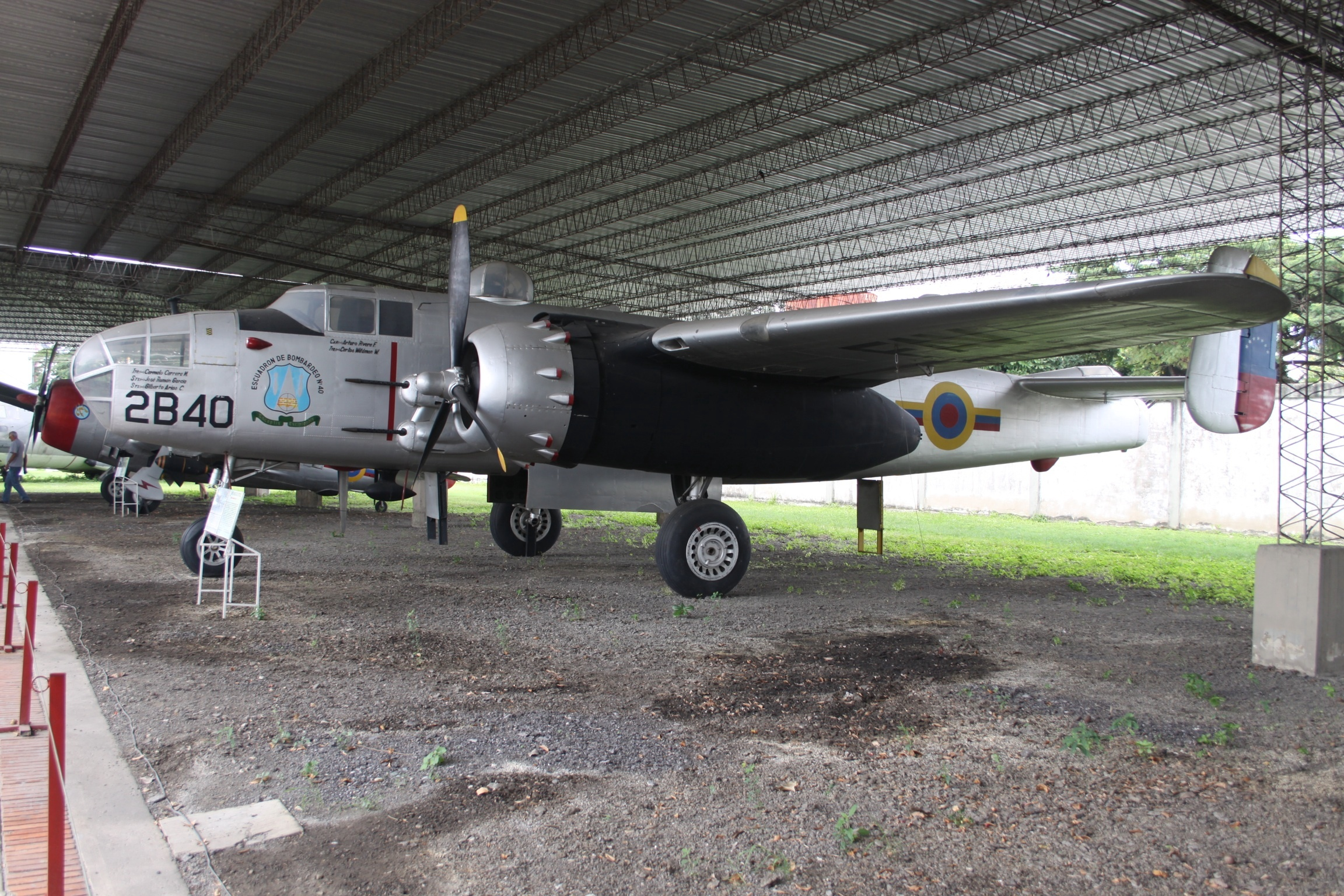
NA B-25J Mitchell

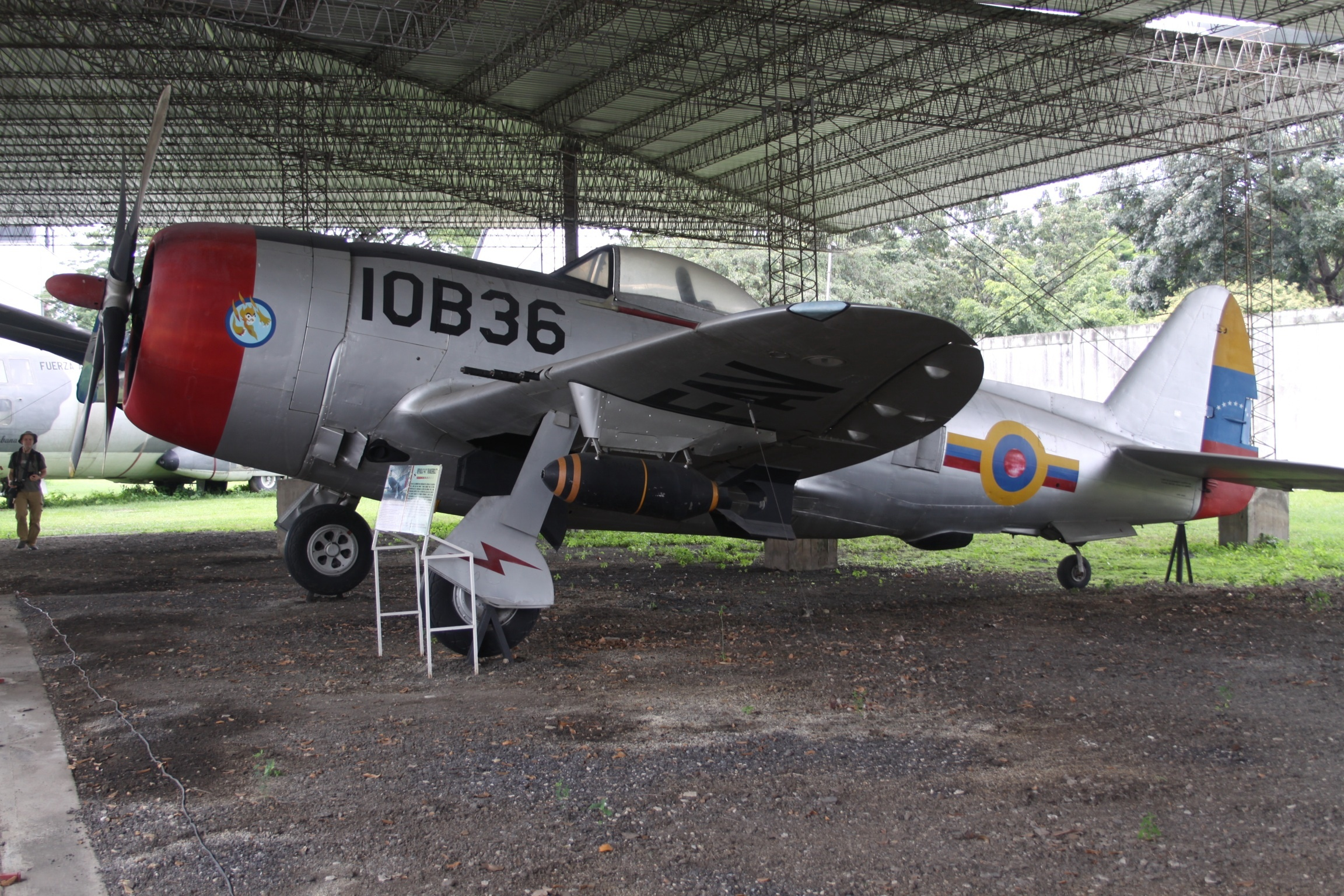
Republic P-47D Thunderbolt

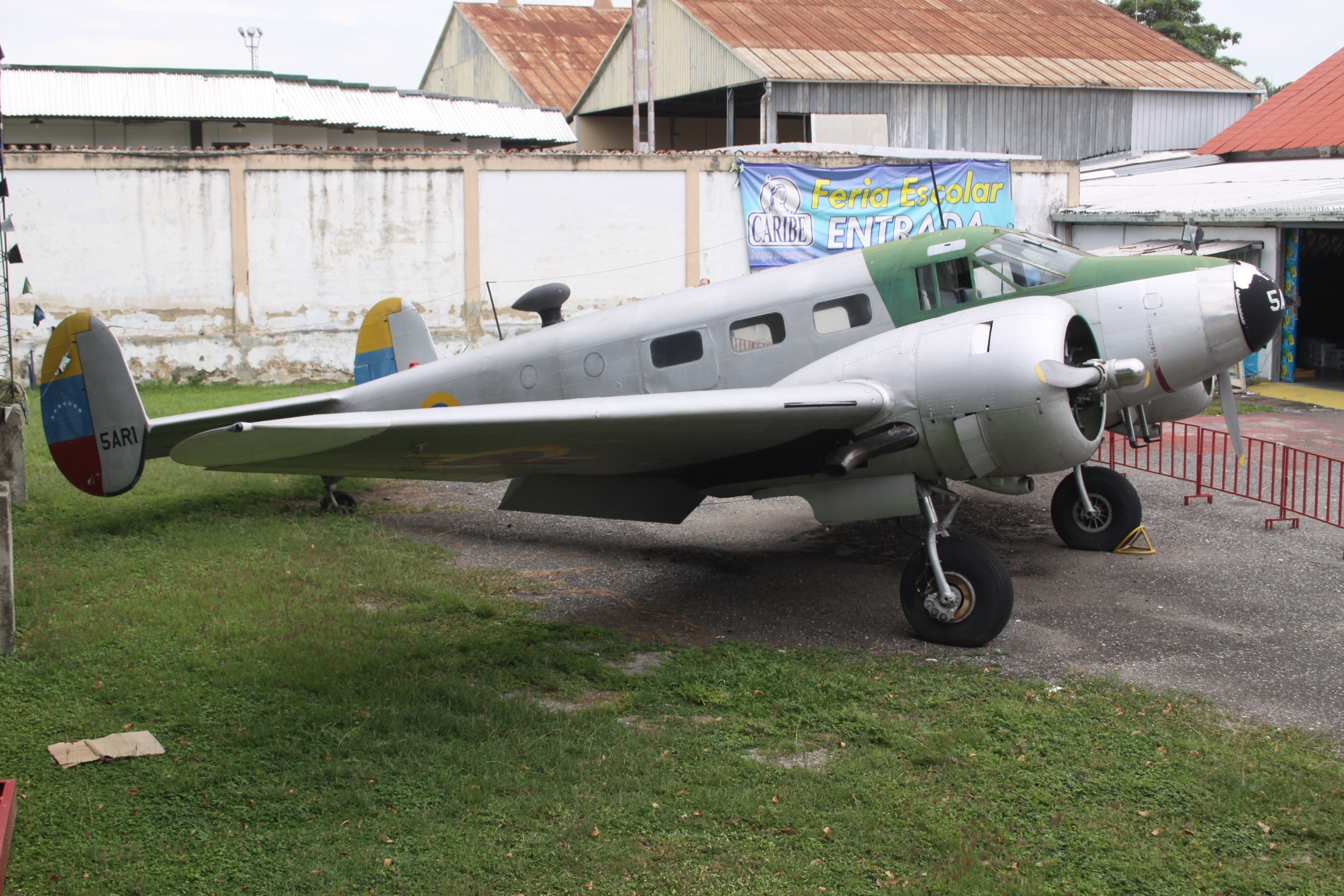
Beechcraft 18

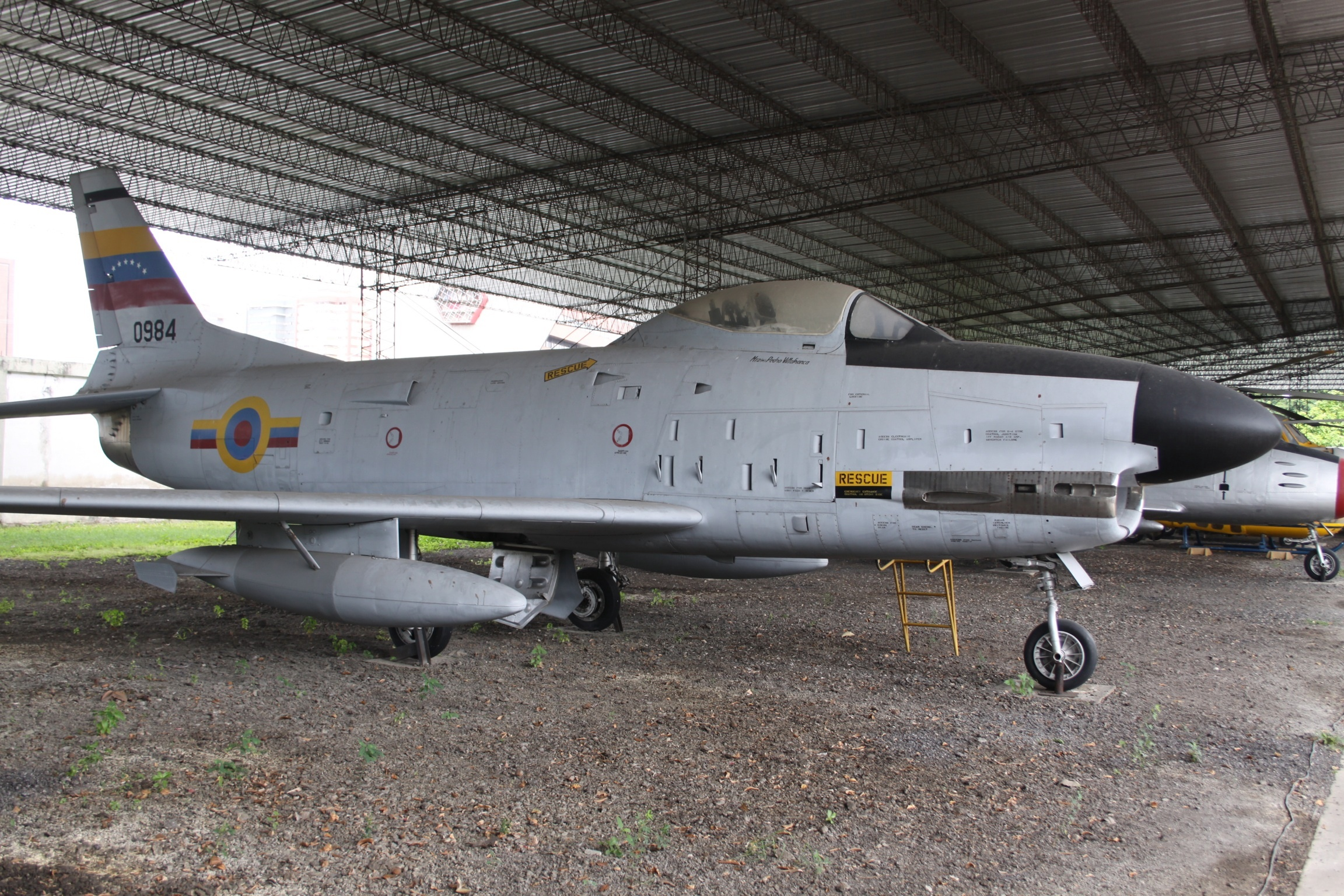
NA/Fiat F-86K Sabre

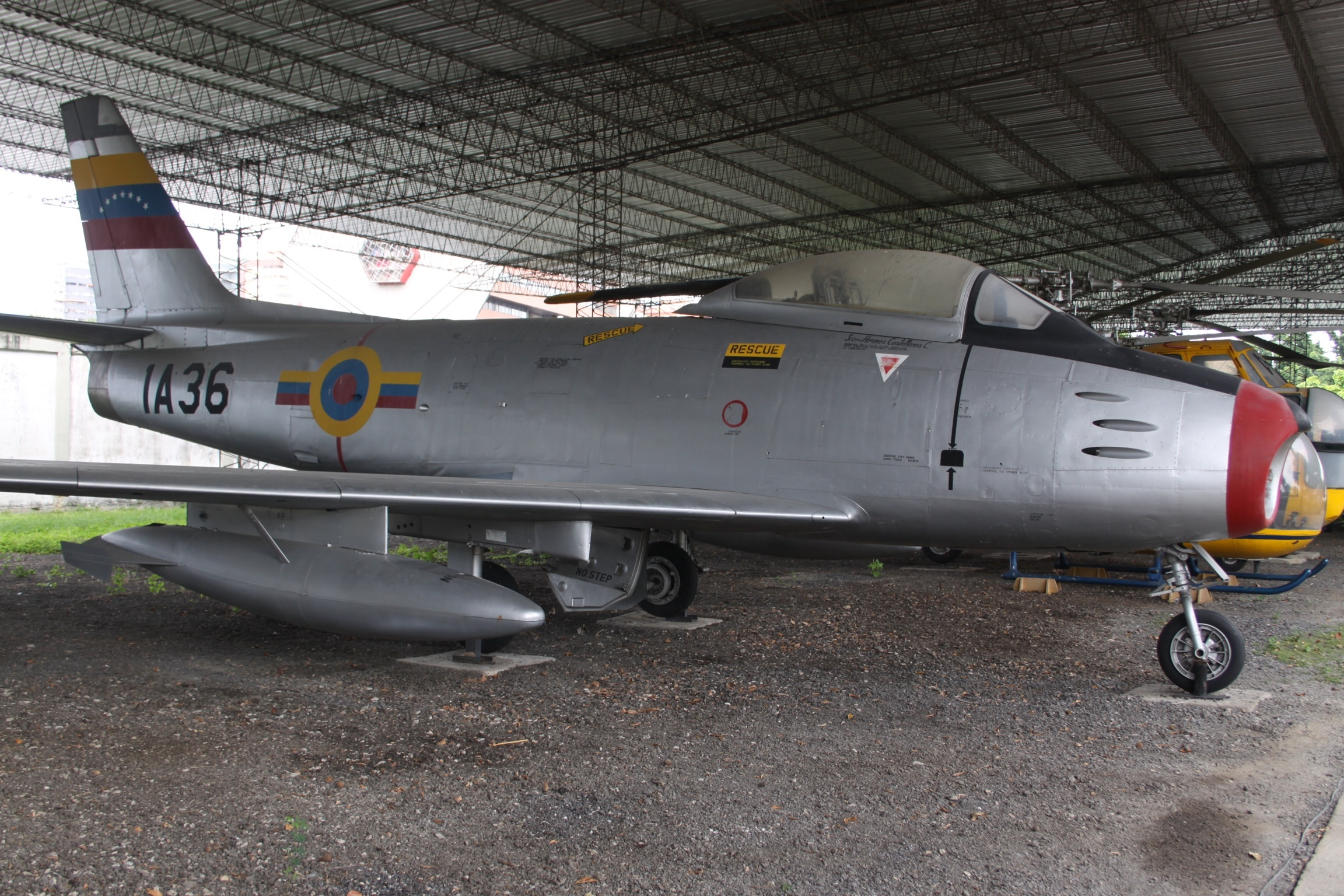
NA F-86F Sabre

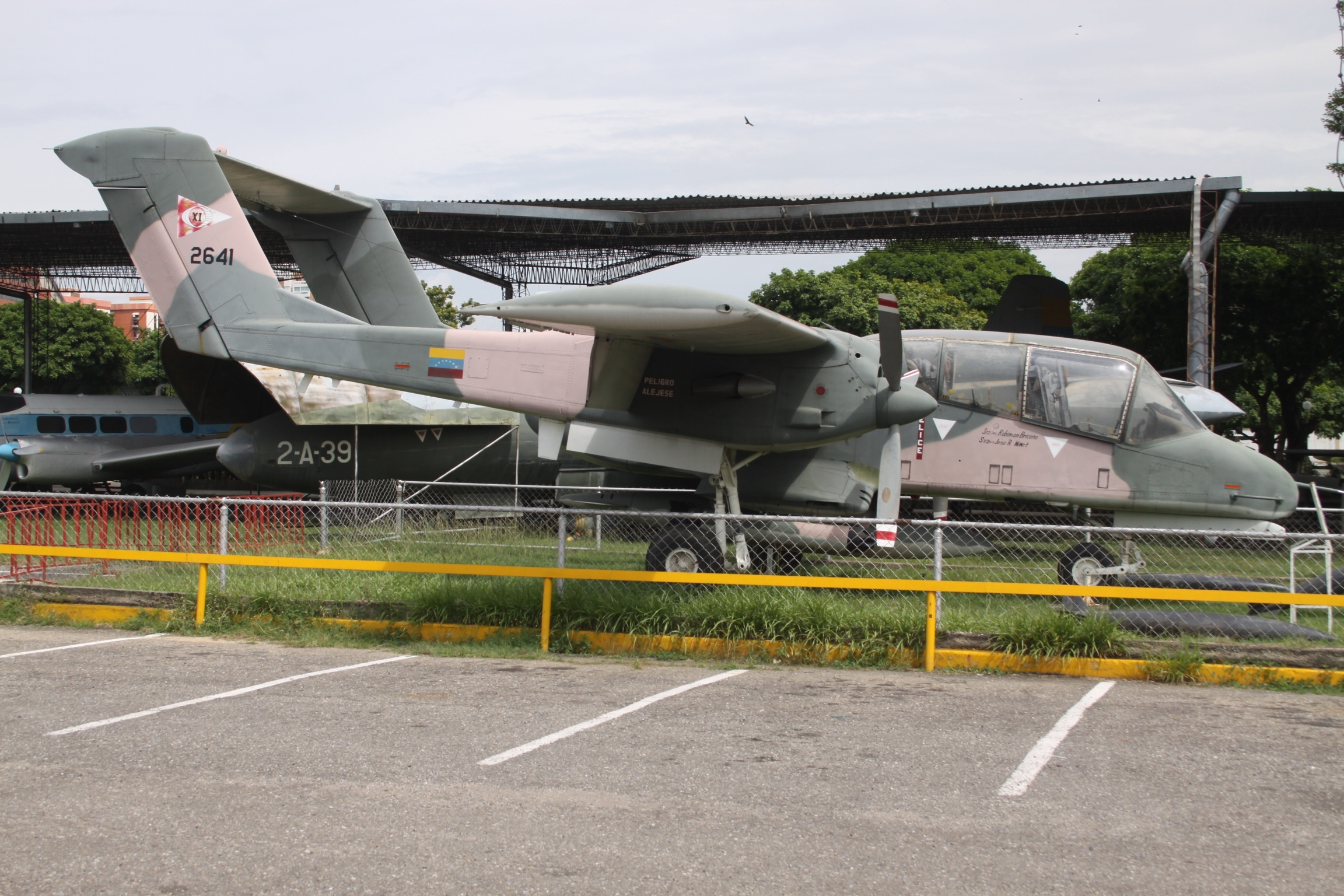
NA Rockwell OV-10E Bronco

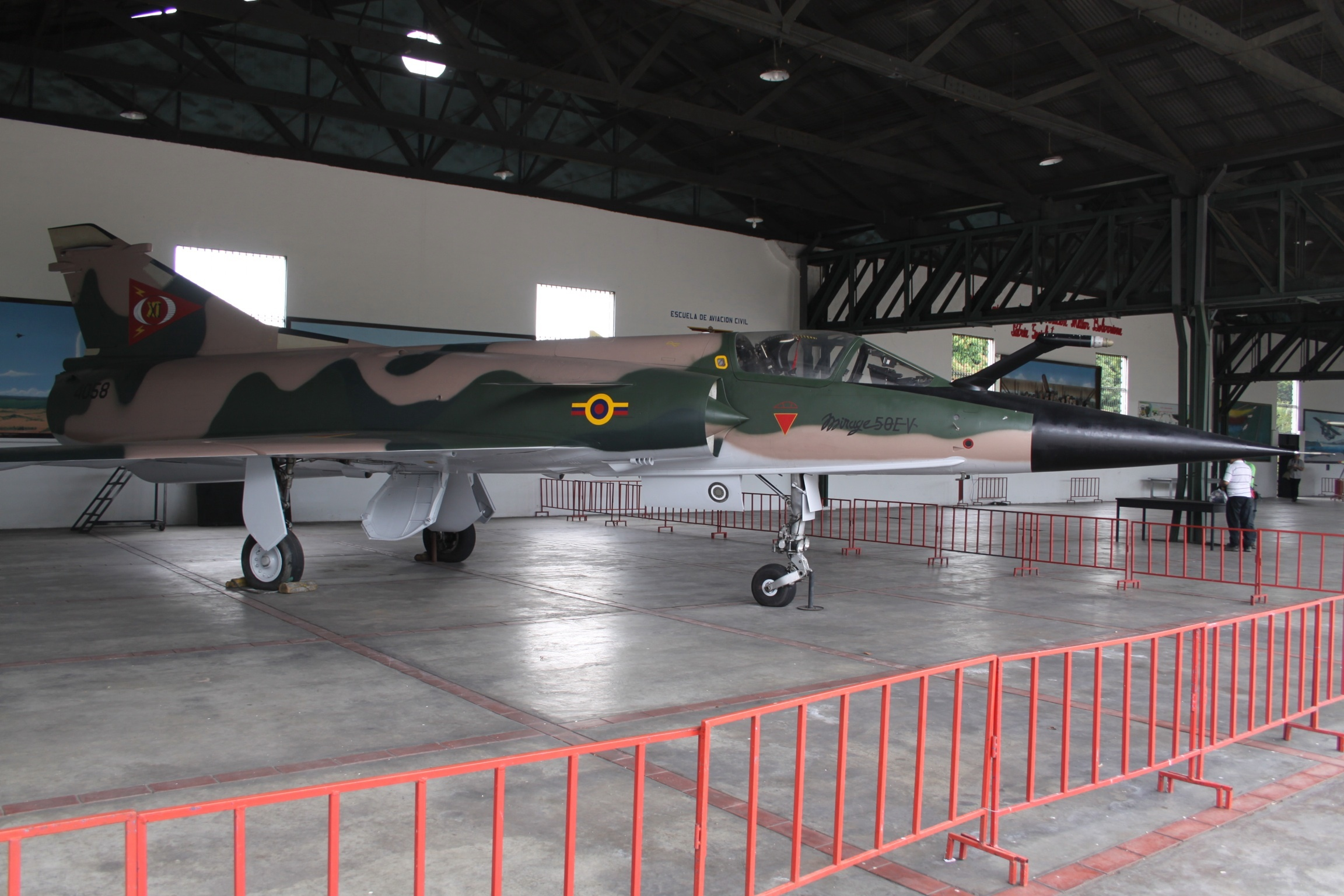
Dassault Mirage 50

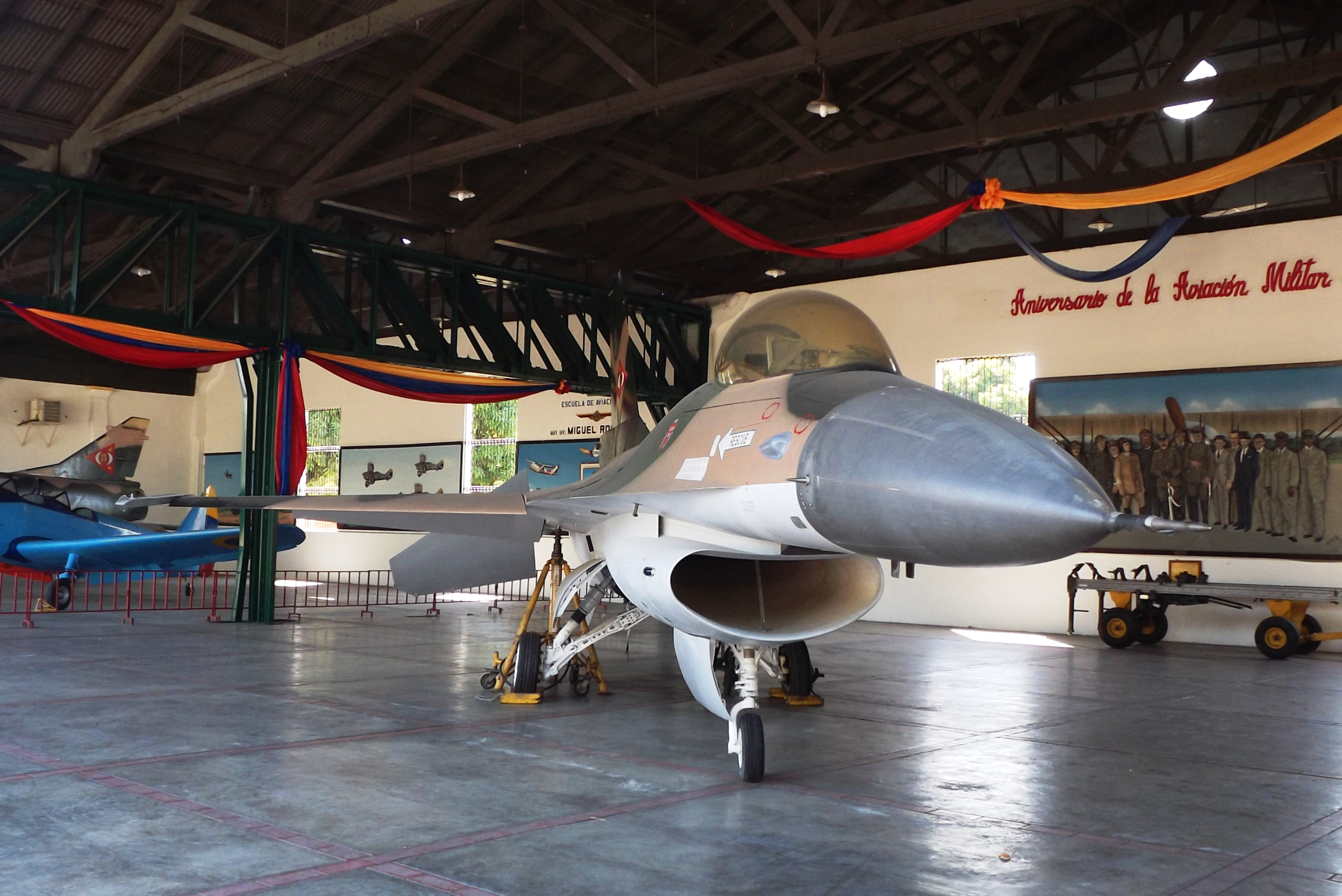
F-16 Fighting Falcon

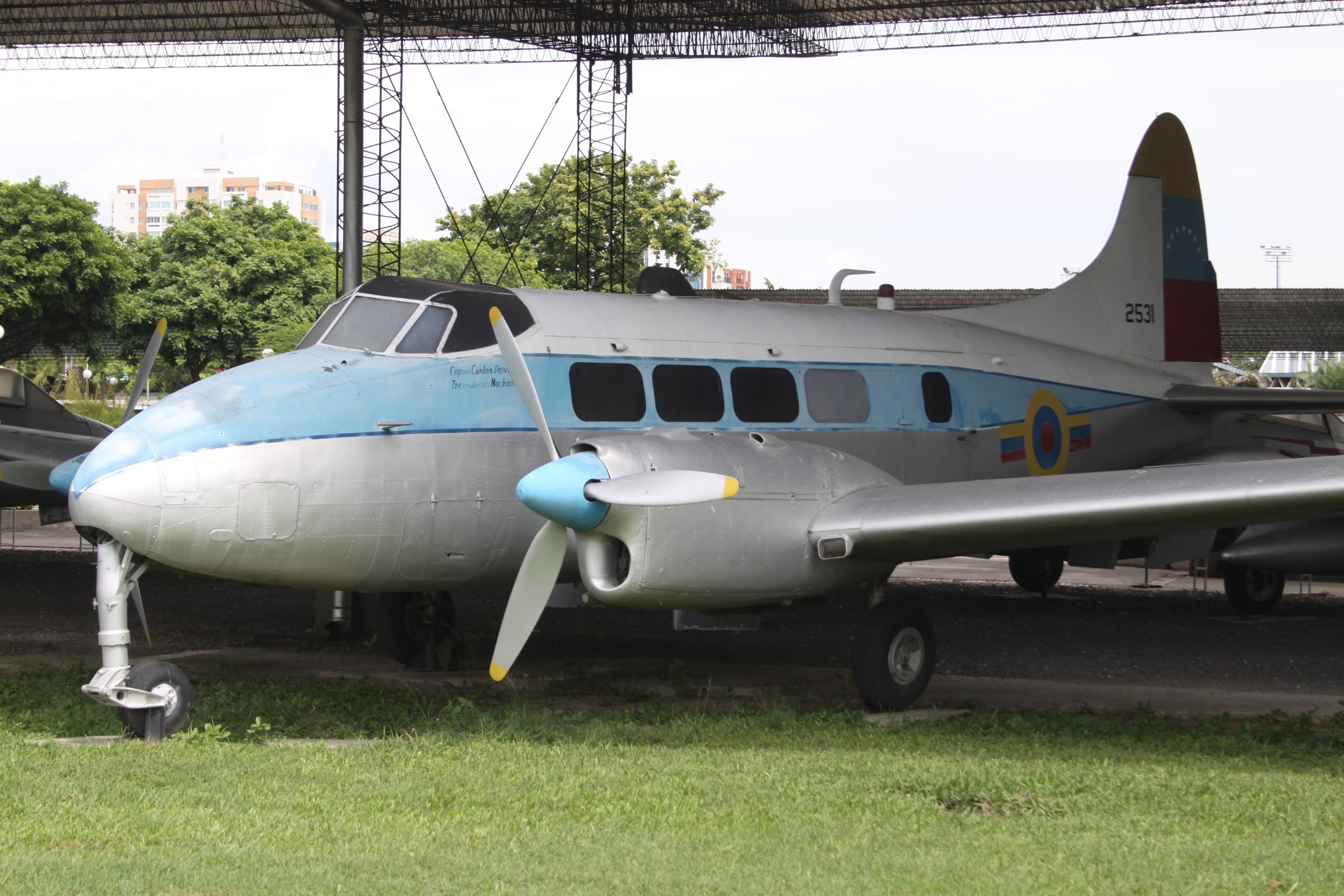
de Havilland DH.104 Dove 2A

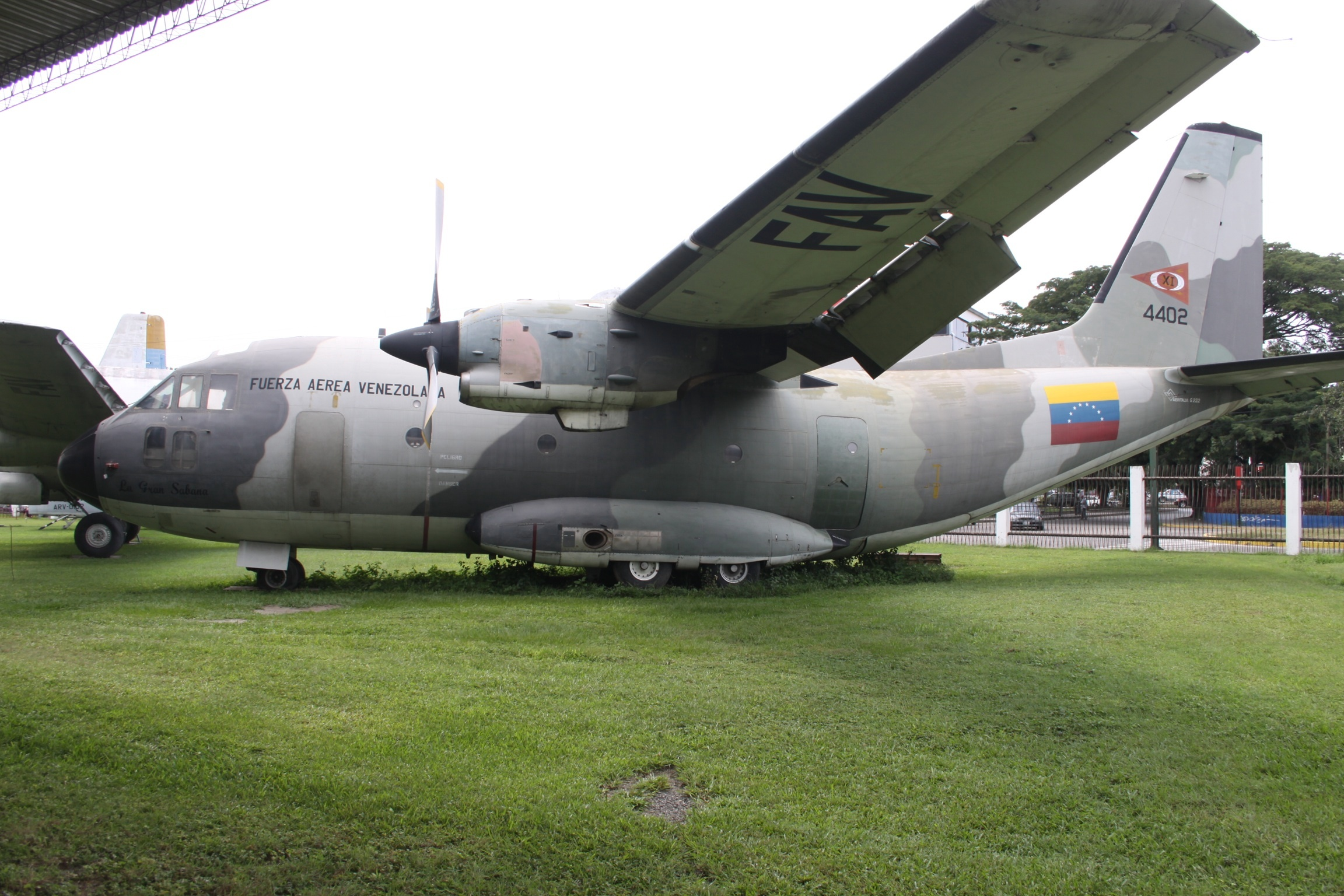
Aeritalia G.222

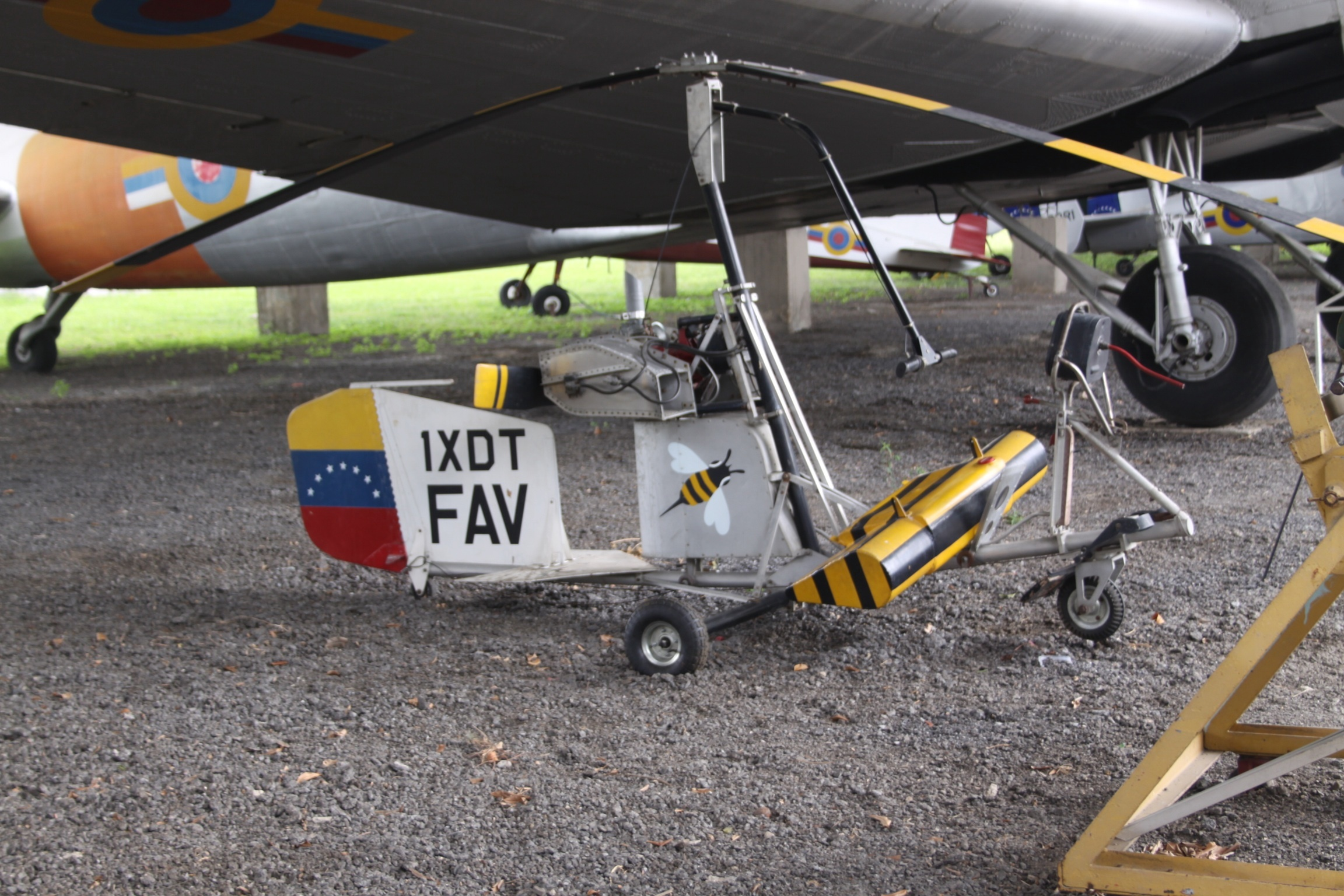
1XDT Autogiro

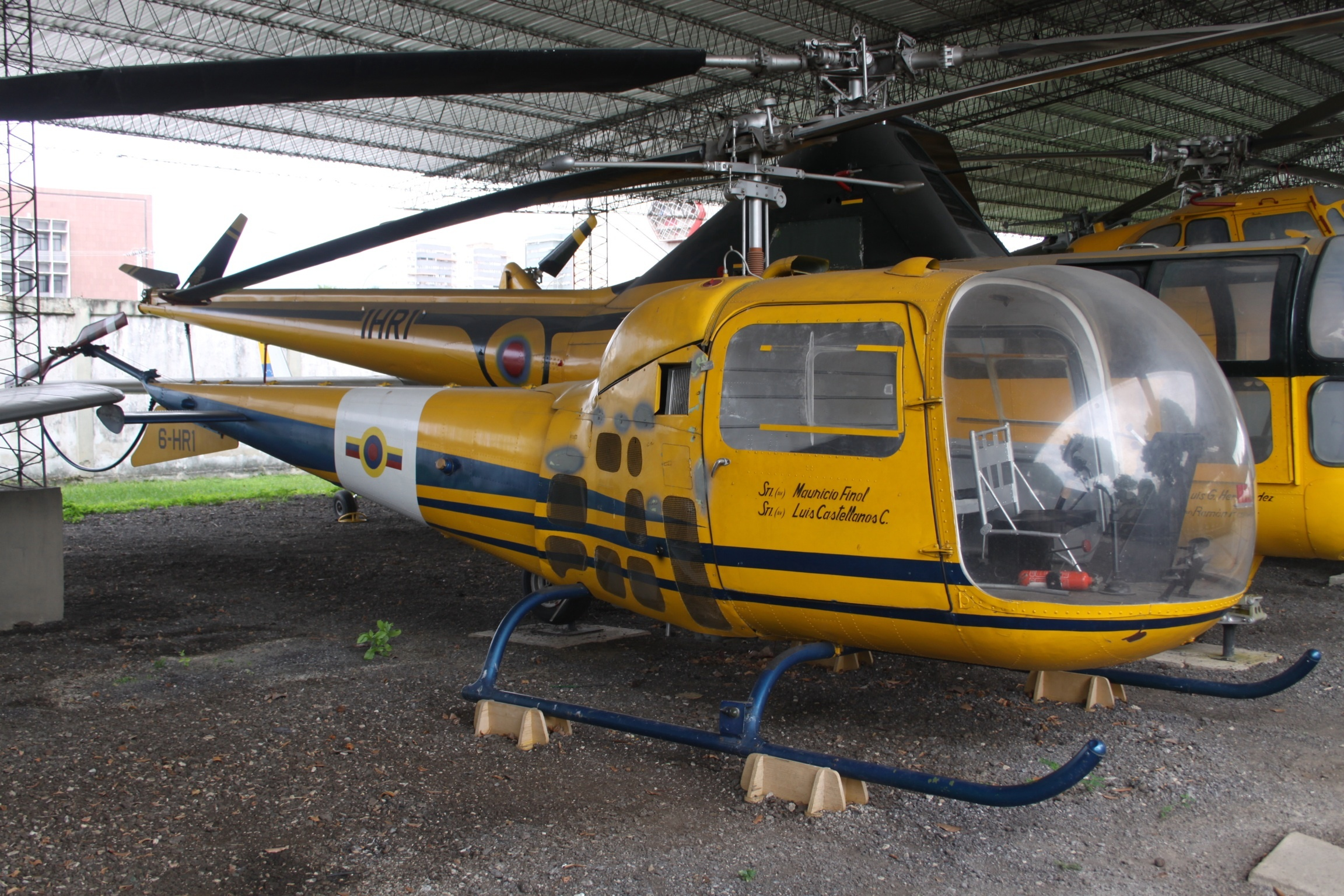
Bell 47J Ranger

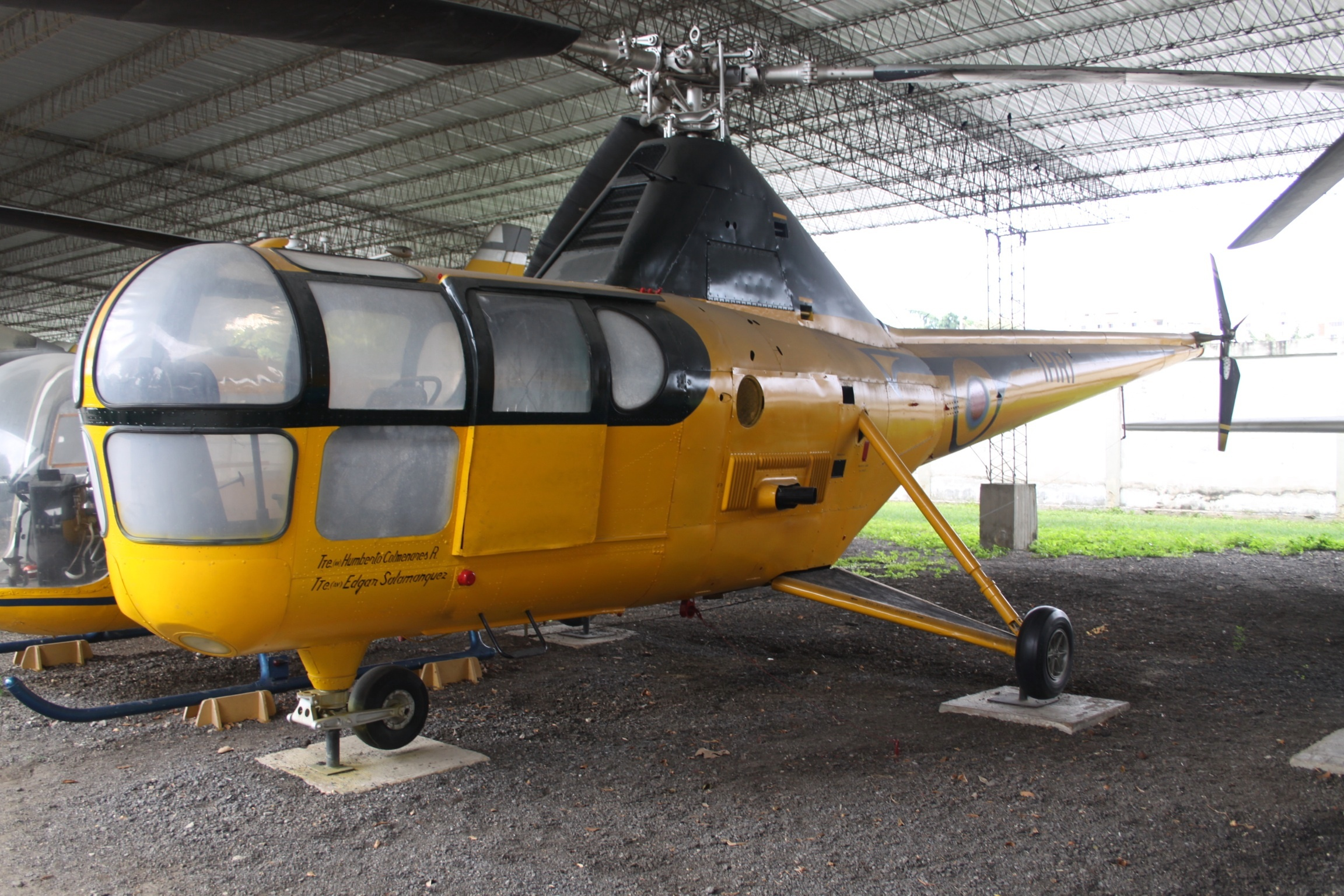
Westland Dragonfly HR.3

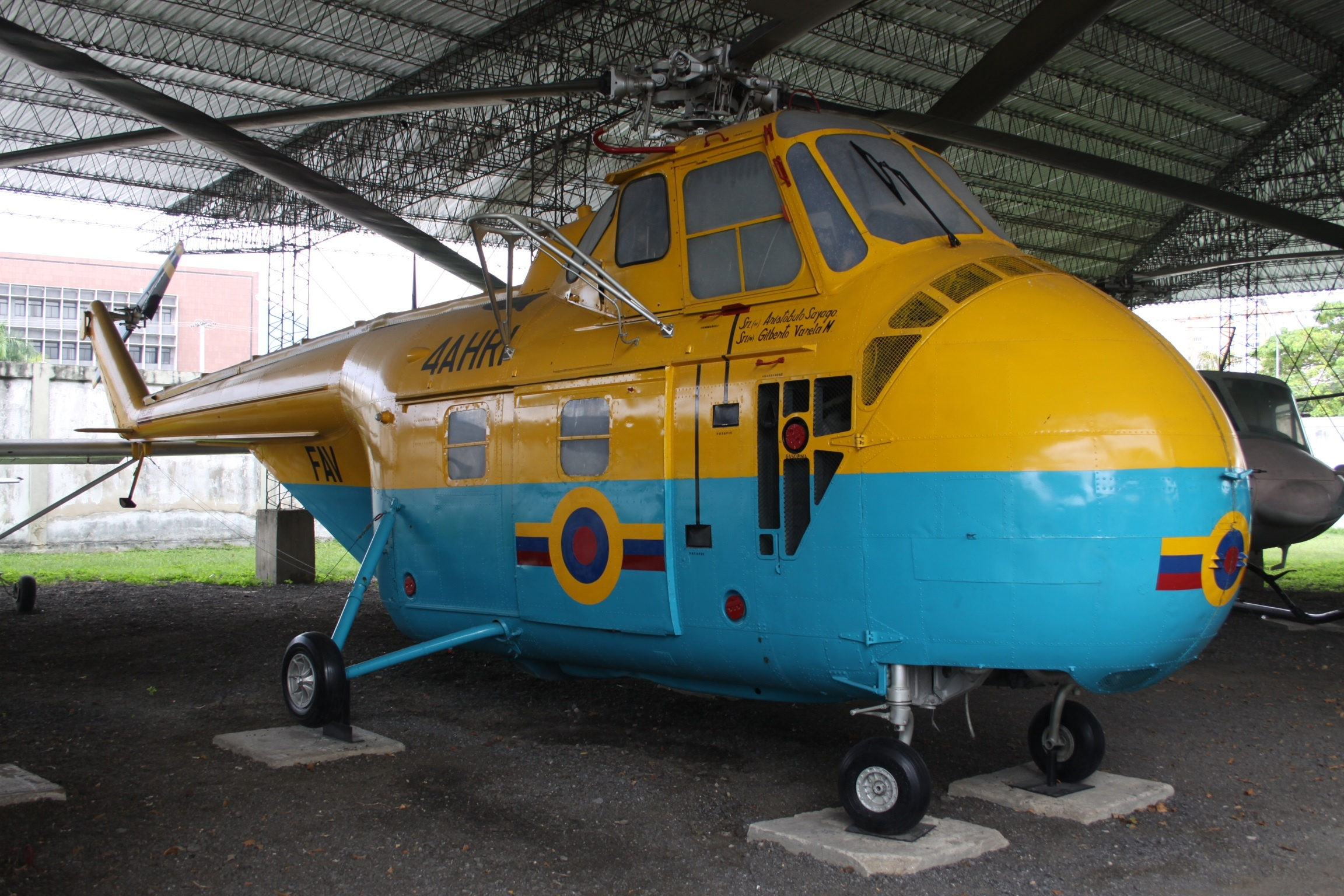
Sikorsky UH-19B

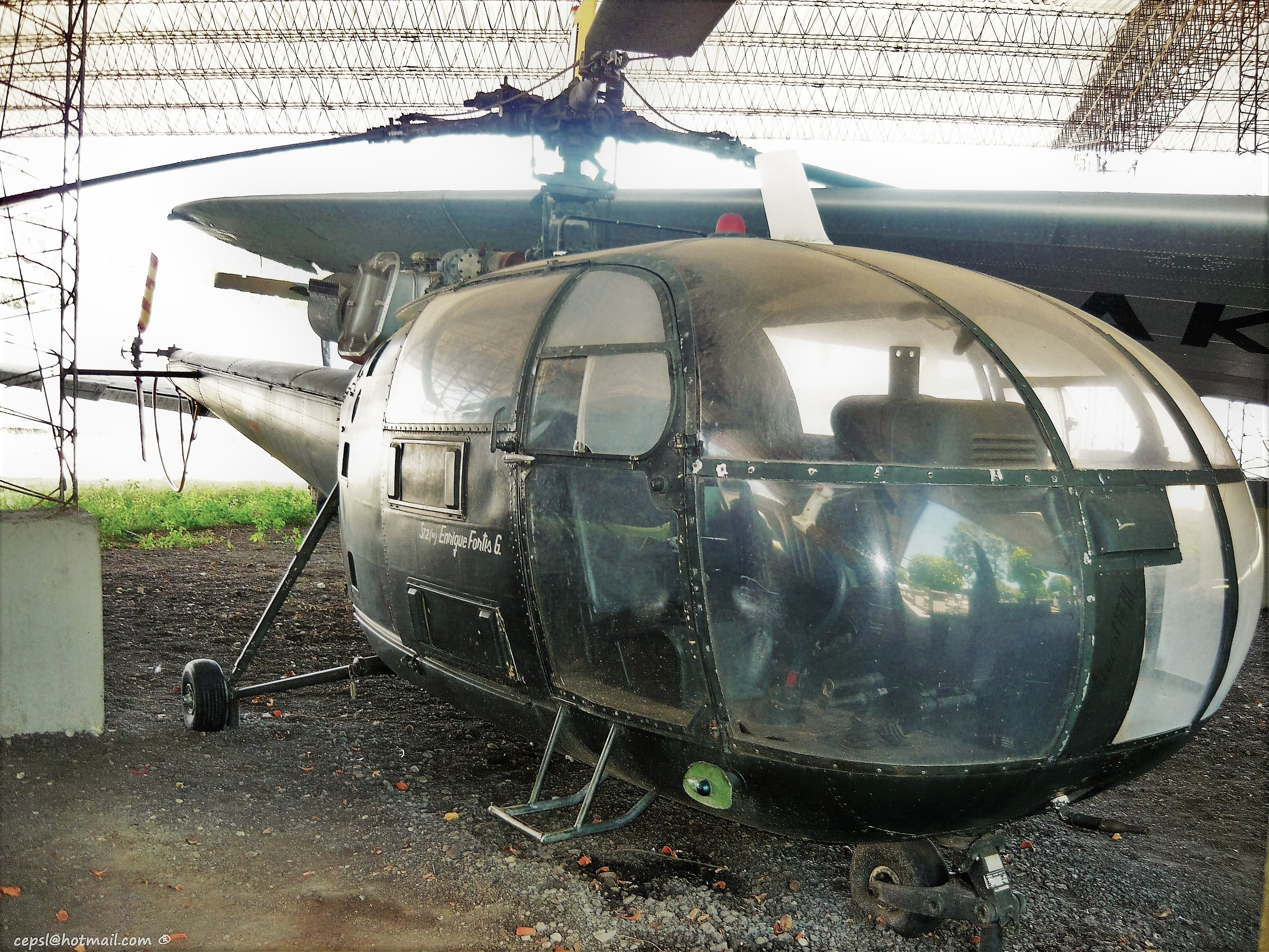
Alouette III

== See also ==
- List of aerospace museums
