= Cedar Valley, Missouri =

Extinct hamlet in Missouri, U.S.

Coordinates: 36°32′24″N 93°17′32″W

Cedar Valley is an extinct town in Taney County, in the U.S. state of Missouri. The townsite was on Long Creek and Big Cedar Hollow just north of the current Missouri Route 86 bridge. The location is currently submerged under the waters of Table Rock Lake.

A post office called Cedar Valley was established in 1873, and remained in operation until 1935. The community took its name from a nearby valley of the same name.
