= List of botanical gardens and arboretums in Kentucky =

This list of botanical gardens and arboretums in Kentucky is intended to include all significant botanical gardens and arboretums in the U.S. state of Kentucky

Name	Image	Affiliation	City
Baker Arboretum			Bowling Green
Bernheim Arboretum and Research Forest			Clermont
Boone County Arboretum			Union
Cave Hill Cemetery			Louisville
Kentucky Horse Park Arboretum			Lexington
Lexington Cemetery			Lexington
University of Kentucky Arboretum		University of Kentucky	Lexington
University of Kentucky Research and Education Center Botanical Garden		University of Kentucky	Princeton
Nannine Clay Wallis Arboretum			Paris
Waterfront Botanical Gardens			Louisville
Western Kentucky Botanical Garden			Owensboro
Yew Dell Botanical Gardens			Crestwood

== See also ==
- List of botanical gardens and arboretums in the United States
