= McVille =

McVille may refer to:

== Places ==
=== United States ===
- McVille, Indiana
- McVille, Kentucky
- McVille, North Dakota
- McVille, Pennsylvania

== Other ==
- The McCrary House, a historic farm house near Huntsville, Alabama, United States

== See also ==
- Macville Township, Aitkin County, Minnesota, United States
