= Boone County, Kentucky =

County in Kentucky, United States

- County
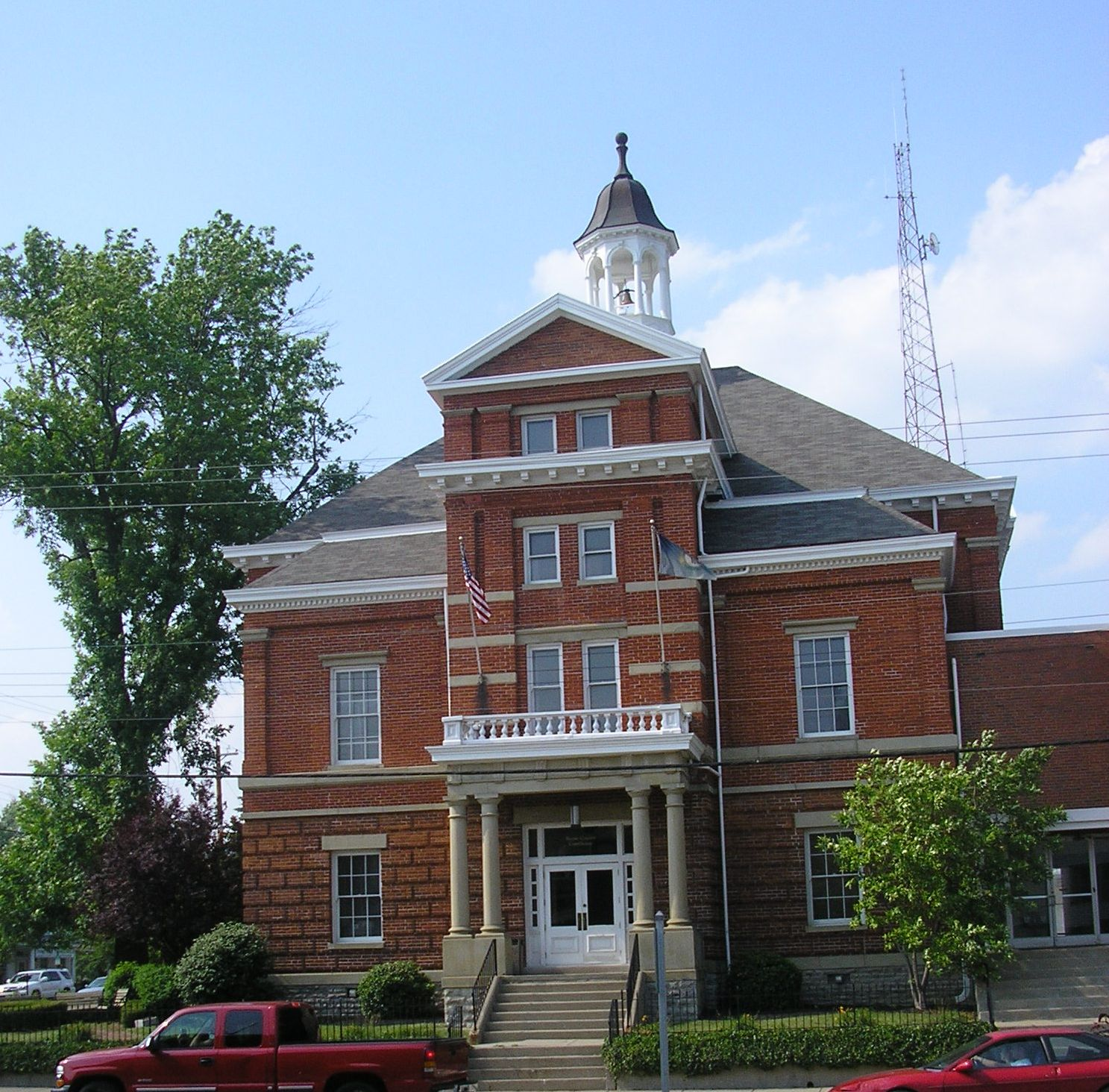
- The old Boone County courthouse in Burlington

- Flag Seal Logo

- Location within the U.S. state of Kentucky
- Coordinates: 38°58′N 84°44′W
- Country: United States
- State: Kentucky
- Founded: 1798
- Named for: Daniel Boone
- Seat: Burlington
- Largest city: Florence

Government
  - Judge/Executive: Gary Moore (R)

Area
  - Total: 256 sq mi (660 km^{2})
  - Land: 246 sq mi (640 km^{2})
  - Water: 10 sq mi (26 km^{2}) 3.9%

Population (2020)
  - Total: 135,968
  - Estimate (2025): 145,316 ▲
  - Density: 553/sq mi (213/km^{2})
- Time zone: UTC−5 (Eastern)
  - Summer (DST): UTC−4 (EDT)
- Congressional district: 4th
- Website: www.boonecountyky.org

Boone County is the northernmost county in the Commonwealth of Kentucky. As of the 2020 census, the population was 135,968, making it the fourth-most populous county in Kentucky. Its county seat is Burlington. The county was formed in 1798 from a portion of Campbell County and was named for frontiersman Daniel Boone. Boone County, with Kenton and Campbell Counties, is of the Northern Kentucky metro area, and the Cincinnati-Middletown, OH-KY-IN Metropolitan Statistical Area. It is the location of the Cincinnati/Northern Kentucky International Airport, which serves Cincinnati and the tri-state area.

== History ==
Native Americans had once inhabited a large late historic village in Petersburg that contained "at least two periods of habitation dating to 1150 A.D. and 1400 A.D."

In 1729, an unknown Frenchman sketched an area on his chart at what is now Big Bone Lick State Park with a note that it was "where they found the bones of an elephant." Another Frenchman, Charles le Moyne de Longueuil (1687–1755), would later be credited with being the first to investigate the Big Bone Lick area.

In 1789, 10-year-old John Tanner was captured by Ojibwe Indians across from the mouth of the Great Miami River, while his Baptist minister father, brother, and their slaves were planting corn.

Boone County was created in 1798, and named after Daniel Boone.

=== Margaret Garner ===
On January 28, 1856, Robert and a pregnant Margaret "Peggy" Garner, together with family members, escaped and fled to Cincinnati, Ohio, along with several other slave families. Seventeen people were reported to have been in their party. In the coldest winter in 60 years, the Ohio River had frozen. The group crossed the ice just west of Covington, Kentucky at daybreak, and escaped to Cincinnati, then divided to avoid detection. They set out for Joseph Kite's house in Cincinnati.

Margaret Garner would become famous for slitting her own daughter's throat (Mary) to prevent her from going back into slavery when Archibald K. Gaines and his posse, along with Federal Marshals, caught up to the fleeing slaves at Joseph Kite's house.

Margaret Garner was first owned by, and may have been the daughter of, the plantation owner John Pollard Gaines himself. In December 1849, the plantation was given along with all the slaves to John P. Gaines' younger brother, Archibald K. Gaines. The Gaines family lived on a farm called Maplewood in Boone County, Kentucky, just west of Richwood Presbyterian Church, of which Archibald K. Gaines was a member. Three of Margaret Garner's children, including Mary, the daughter whose throat Margaret Garner slashed, were likely the children of Archibald K. Gaines, the only adult white male at Maplewood. The timing suggests they were each conceived after his wife had become pregnant and was unavailable to him.

Margaret Garner's story was the inspiration for the novel Beloved (1987) by Nobel Prize winner Toni Morrison (that later was adapted into a film of the same name starring Oprah Winfrey), as well as for her libretto for the early 21st century opera Margaret Garner (2005), composed by Richard Danielpour.

== Geography ==
According to the United States Census Bureau, the county has a total area of 256 square miles (660 km^{2}), of which 246 square miles (640 km^{2}) is land and 10 square miles (26 km^{2}) (3.9%) is water. Its location along the Ohio River was key to its early development, as the river was the major transportation route.

=== Adjacent counties ===
- Hamilton County, Ohio (north)
- Kenton County (east)
- Grant County (south)
- Gallatin County (southwest)
- Switzerland County, Indiana (southwest)
- Ohio County, Indiana (west)
- Dearborn County, Indiana (northwest)

=== Climate ===
Boone County's climate is a humid subtropical (Cfa).

== Major highways ==
- I-71
- I-75
- I-275
- US 25
- US 42
- US 127
- KY 8
- KY 14
- KY 16
- KY 18
- KY 20
- KY 212
- KY 236
- KY 237
- KY 338
- KY 491
- KY 536
- KY 717
- KY 842
- KY 1017
- KY 1292
- KY 1829
- KY 1925
- KY 1942
- KY 3168
- KY 3608

== Demographics ==
Historical population
Census	Pop.	Note	%±
1800	1,534		—
1810	3,608		135.2%
1820	6,542		81.3%
1830	9,075		38.7%
1840	10,034		10.6%
1850	11,185		11.5%
1860	11,196		0.1%
1870	10,696		−4.5%
1880	11,996		12.2%
1890	12,246		2.1%
1900	11,170		−8.8%
1910	9,420		−15.7%
1920	9,572		1.6%
1930	9,595		0.2%
1940	10,820		12.8%
1950	13,015		20.3%
1960	21,940		68.6%
1970	32,812		49.6%
1980	45,842		39.7%
1990	57,589		25.6%
2000	85,991		49.3%
2010	118,811		38.2%
2020	135,968		14.4%
2025 (est.)	145,316	▲	6.9%
U.S. Decennial Census; 1790–1960 1900–1990; 1990–2000 2010–2020

=== 2020 census ===
As of the 2020 census, the county had a population of 135,968. The median age was 37.5 years. 26.4% of residents were under the age of 18 and 13.9% of residents were 65 years of age or older. For every 100 females there were 98.1 males, and for every 100 females age 18 and over there were 95.9 males age 18 and over.

The racial makeup of the county was 84.2% White, 4.2% Black or African American, 0.3% American Indian and Alaska Native, 2.3% Asian, 0.2% Native Hawaiian and Pacific Islander, 2.4% from some other race, and 6.4% from two or more races. Hispanic or Latino residents of any race comprised 5.7% of the population.

88.5% of residents lived in urban areas, while 11.5% lived in rural areas.

There were 49,180 households in the county, of which 36.9% had children under the age of 18 living with them and 22.3% had a female householder with no spouse or partner present. About 22.1% of all households were made up of individuals and 8.7% had someone living alone who was 65 years of age or older.

There were 51,468 housing units, of which 4.4% were vacant. Among occupied housing units, 73.0% were owner-occupied and 27.0% were renter-occupied. The homeowner vacancy rate was 1.0% and the rental vacancy rate was 5.6%.

=== 2000 census ===
As of the census of 2000, there were 85,991 people, 31,258 households, and 23,443 families residing in the county. The population density was 349 per square mile (135/km^{2}). There were 33,351 housing units at an average density of 135 per square mile (52/km^{2}). The racial makeup of the county was 85.3% White, 5% Black or African American, 0.23% Native American, 2.6% Asian, 0.2% Pacific Islander, 0.75% from other races, and 2.3% from two or more races. 4.98% of the population were Hispanic or Latino of any race.

There were 31,258 households, out of which 39.80% had children under the age of 18 living with them, 61.60% were married couples living together, 9.80% had a female householder with no husband present, and 25.00% were non-families. 20.20% of all households were made up of individuals, and 6.20% had someone living alone who was 65 years of age or older. The average household size was 2.73 and the average family size was 3.17.

In the county, the population was spread out, with 28.70% under the age of 18, 8.50% from 18 to 24, 33.50% from 25 to 44, 21.30% from 45 to 64, and 8.10% who were 65 years of age or older. The median age was 33 years. For every 100 females there were 97.70 males. For every 100 females age 18 and over, there were 94.70 males.

The median income for a household in the county was $53,593, and the median income for a family was $61,114. Males had a median income of $42,105 versus $27,414 for females. The per capita income for the county was $23,535. About 4.40% of families and 5.60% of the population were below the poverty line, including 6.40% of those under age 18 and 7.70% of those age 65 or over.

== Politics ==
United States presidential election results for Boone County, Kentucky
Year	Republican		Democratic		Third party(ies)	
Year	No.	%	No.	%	No.	%
1880	446	20.43%	1,734	79.43%	3	0.14%
1884	529	23.49%	1,694	75.22%	29	1.29%
1888	635	22.93%	2,116	76.42%	18	0.65%
1892	545	20.99%	2,009	77.39%	42	1.62%
1896	781	24.83%	2,317	73.65%	48	1.53%
1900	759	24.69%	2,302	74.89%	13	0.42%
1904	578	21.99%	2,013	76.57%	38	1.45%
1908	631	23.29%	2,041	75.34%	37	1.37%
1912	371	16.25%	1,738	76.13%	174	7.62%
1916	531	20.84%	2,008	78.81%	9	0.35%
1920	973	21.72%	3,472	77.50%	35	0.78%
1924	1,340	36.39%	2,204	59.86%	138	3.75%
1928	2,604	58.31%	1,855	41.54%	7	0.16%
1932	1,355	27.52%	3,536	71.83%	32	0.65%
1936	1,042	26.62%	2,785	71.14%	88	2.25%
1940	1,357	34.90%	2,518	64.76%	13	0.33%
1944	1,457	37.16%	2,451	62.51%	13	0.33%
1948	1,151	32.20%	2,320	64.90%	104	2.91%
1952	2,309	46.68%	2,620	52.97%	17	0.34%
1956	3,139	51.54%	2,933	48.16%	18	0.30%
1960	4,835	61.99%	2,965	38.01%	0	0.00%
1964	3,430	40.25%	5,077	59.58%	15	0.18%
1968	4,081	45.09%	2,725	30.11%	2,245	24.80%
1972	7,355	71.55%	2,595	25.24%	330	3.21%
1976	5,602	49.21%	5,602	49.21%	181	1.59%
1980	8,263	58.40%	5,374	37.98%	511	3.61%
1984	12,690	71.90%	4,853	27.50%	106	0.60%
1988	12,667	69.76%	5,382	29.64%	108	0.59%
1992	12,306	52.20%	6,514	27.63%	4,755	20.17%
1996	15,085	58.91%	8,379	32.72%	2,143	8.37%
2000	22,016	68.83%	9,248	28.91%	720	2.25%
2004	32,329	71.71%	12,391	27.49%	362	0.80%
2008	33,812	66.59%	16,292	32.09%	670	1.32%
2012	35,922	68.41%	15,629	29.76%	960	1.83%
2016	39,082	67.83%	15,026	26.08%	3,510	6.09%
2020	44,814	66.89%	20,901	31.20%	1,283	1.91%
2024	45,650	67.71%	20,601	30.56%	1,170	1.74%

Boone County is a solidly Republican county in presidential elections; the last time it voted Democratic was in 1964, when Lyndon B. Johnson won in a national landslide. In 1976, however, the county gave exactly the same number of votes to Democrat Jimmy Carter and Republican Gerald Ford.

Before 2001, Boone County had a county police department providing general-service law enforcement to the unincorporated areas of the county. The police department was merged with the county sheriff's department in 2001, and the sheriff's department now serves that role. As of 2025, the Boone County Sheriff's Office is the largest full service Sheriff's Office in the Commonwealth of Kentucky, providing 24-hour law enforcement, as well as a myriad of other services. Sheriff Michael A. Helmig retired in April 2025, after having served in that role since 1997. Long-time Chief Deputy, Les Hill, was appointed as his successor.

The Boone County Jail is a short-term incarceration facility serving all law enforcement agencies in Boone County, including the Kentucky State Police, the Florence Police Department, the Boone County Sheriff's Office, and the Cincinnati/Northern Kentucky International Airport Police Department. The Boone County Jail system consists of the main jail and a workcamp facility. The Main Jail has the capacity of housing 424 maximum, medium, and minimum security inmates. The workcamp houses 76 minimum security inmates. As of 2022 the Jailer, who in Kentucky is elected separately from the Sheriff, is Jason Maydak. As of 2025, Boone County Jail is the only immigration detention facility located in Kentucky.

=== Elected officials ===
Elected officials as of January 3, 2025
U.S. House	Thomas Massie (R)	KY 4
Ky. Senate	Steve Rawlings (R)	11
Ky. Senate	Gex Williams (R)	20
Ky. House	Marianne Proctor (R)	60
Ky. House	Savannah Maddox (R)	61
Ky. House	Kim Banta (R)	63
Ky. House	T. J. Roberts (R)	66
Ky. House	Steven Doan (R)	69
Ky. House	Mark Hart (R)	78

== Economy ==
Boone County is the location of the Cincinnati/Northern Kentucky International Airport, which includes the headquarters of DHL Express and Southern Air.

The county's proximity to Cincinnati/Northern Kentucky International Airport (CVG) has made it a major hub for logistics and e-commerce distribution operations, with facilities operated by companies including Amazon, and Verst Logistics, a contract packaging and transportation management facility, a company headquartered in Hebron.

=== Amazon Air Hub ===
In August 2026, Amazon celebrated its fifth anniversary at CVG, with its $1.5 billion, 600-acre Amazon Air Hub, which has created more than 4,000 local jobs. Since 2010, Amazon has invested more than $30 billion in Boone County through infrastructure development, and various other business and economics. The facility is Amazon's largest air field operation worldwide and serves as the flagship hub for the company's global Amazon Air network.

== Major attractions ==
The Creation Museum (Petersburg), operated by the apologetics ministry Answers in Genesis, as well as Big Bone Lick State Park, "birthplace of American paleontology", Jane's Saddlebag and Boone County Arboretum are located in Boone County.

== Education ==
Most of the county is within Boone County Schools. A portion is in Walton-Verona Independent School District. High schools: Boone County High School, Conner High School, Ryle High School, and Randall K. Cooper High School.

== Communities ==
=== Cities ===
- Florence
- Union
- Walton

=== Census-designated places ===
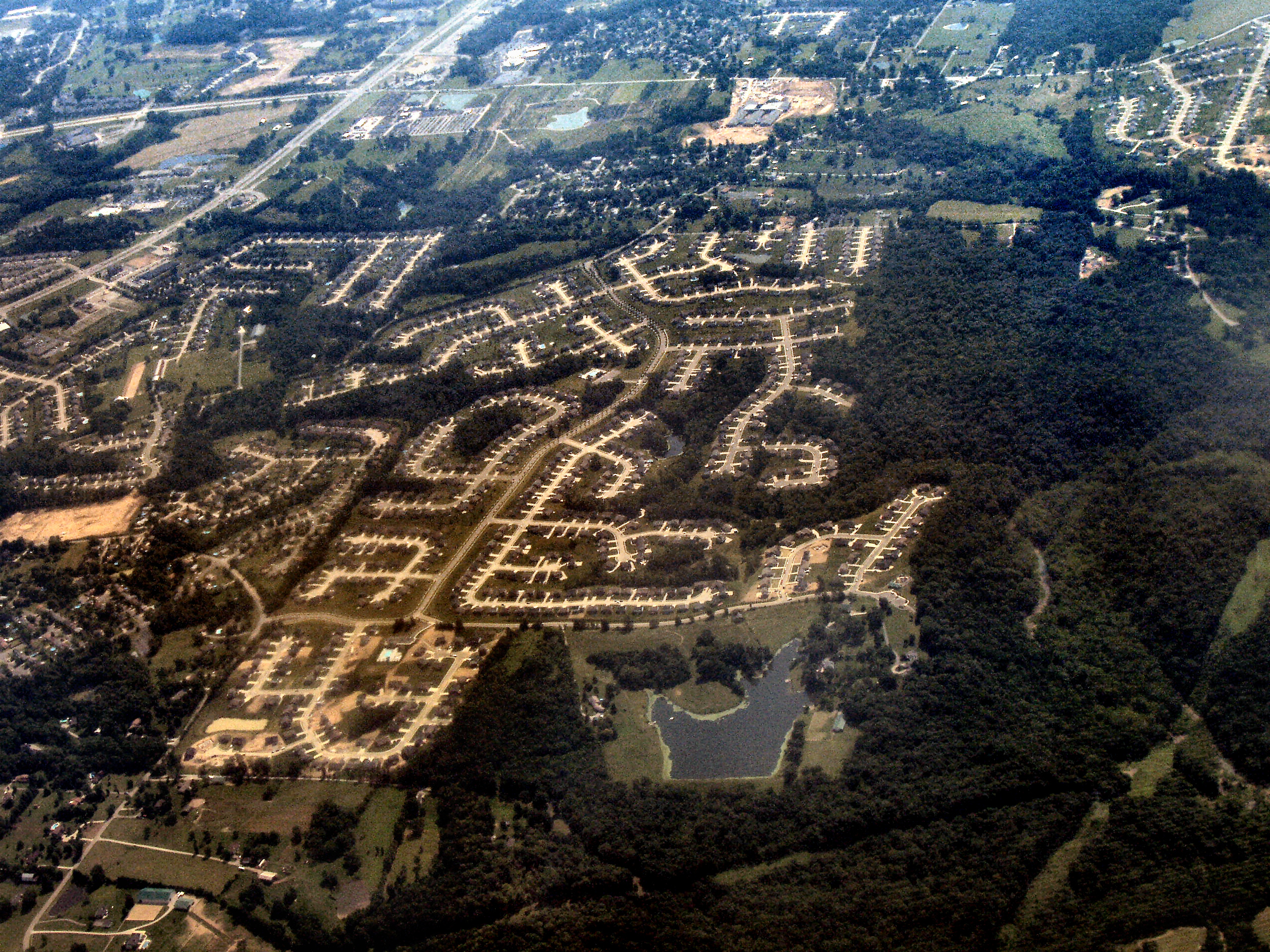
Burlington from the air, looking east

- Belleview
- Burlington (county seat)
- Francisville
- Hebron
- Oakbrook
- Petersburg
- Rabbit Hash
- Verona

=== Other unincorporated communities ===
- Big Bone
- Bullittsville
- Constance
- Hamilton
- Limaburg
- McVille
- Richwood
- Taylorsport

== See also ==
- Abner Gaines House
- Big Bone Lick State Park
- Boone County Arboretum
- Dinsmore Homestead
- East Bend, Kentucky
- National Register of Historic Places listings in Boone County, Kentucky
- Richwood Presbyterian Church
