= Hempsteade Neighborhood =

Hempsteade
- Neighborhood of Union, Kentucky
- Interactive map of Hempsteade
- Coordinates: 38.945982°N 84.654545°W
- Country: United States
- State: Kentucky
- County: Boone
- City: Union
- Established: 1990

Area
  - Total: 0.380 sq mi (0.98 km^{2})
  - Water: 0 sq mi (0.0 km^{2})
- Time zone: UTC-5 (Eastern (EST))
  - Summer (DST): UTC-4 (EDT)
- ZIP code: 41091
- Area code: 859
- Website: Hempsteade.com

Hempsteade Neighborhood is a subdivision in southeastern Union, Kentucky, United States. The north part of the neighborhood is adjacent to Mt. Zion Road (Kentucky Route 536), the south part of neighborhood almost borders Frogtown Road (KY 3060 east) but there is a small neighborhood in between, the east part of the neighborhood borders the estates that are along Gunpowder Road (Kentucky Route 237) and the west part of the neighborhood borders Hampshire neighborhood.

== Neighborhood statistics ==
- Homes: 436
- Land Area: 0.38 square miles (0.98 km^{2})
- Population density: 1,348 people per square mile
- Median household income (2013): $107,736
