= Oakbrook =

Oakbrook, Oak brook or Oak Brook may refer to:

== Places ==
=== United States ===
==== Illinois ====
- Oakbrook Terrace, Illinois, a city in DuPage County, a suburb of Chicago
- Oak Brook, Illinois, a city in DuPage County, a suburb of Chicago
- Oakbrook Center, a shopping mall in Oak Brook, Illinois

==== Other areas ====
- Oakbrook, Kentucky, a census designated place in Boone County
- Oakbrook Neighborhood, in Summerville, South Carolina

== Schools ==
- Oakbrook Elementary School, in Clover Park School District, Washington
- Oakbrook Elementary School and Oakbrook Middle School, in Dorchester School District Two, South Carolina
- Oakbrook Elementary School, in Parkway School District, Missouri
- Oakbrook House, former mansion of steel baron Mark Firth, now part of Notre Dame High School

== Other uses ==
- Henry Brandon, Baron Brandon of Oakbrook (1920–1999), British judge
