= Adam Kunkel (basketball) =

American basketball player

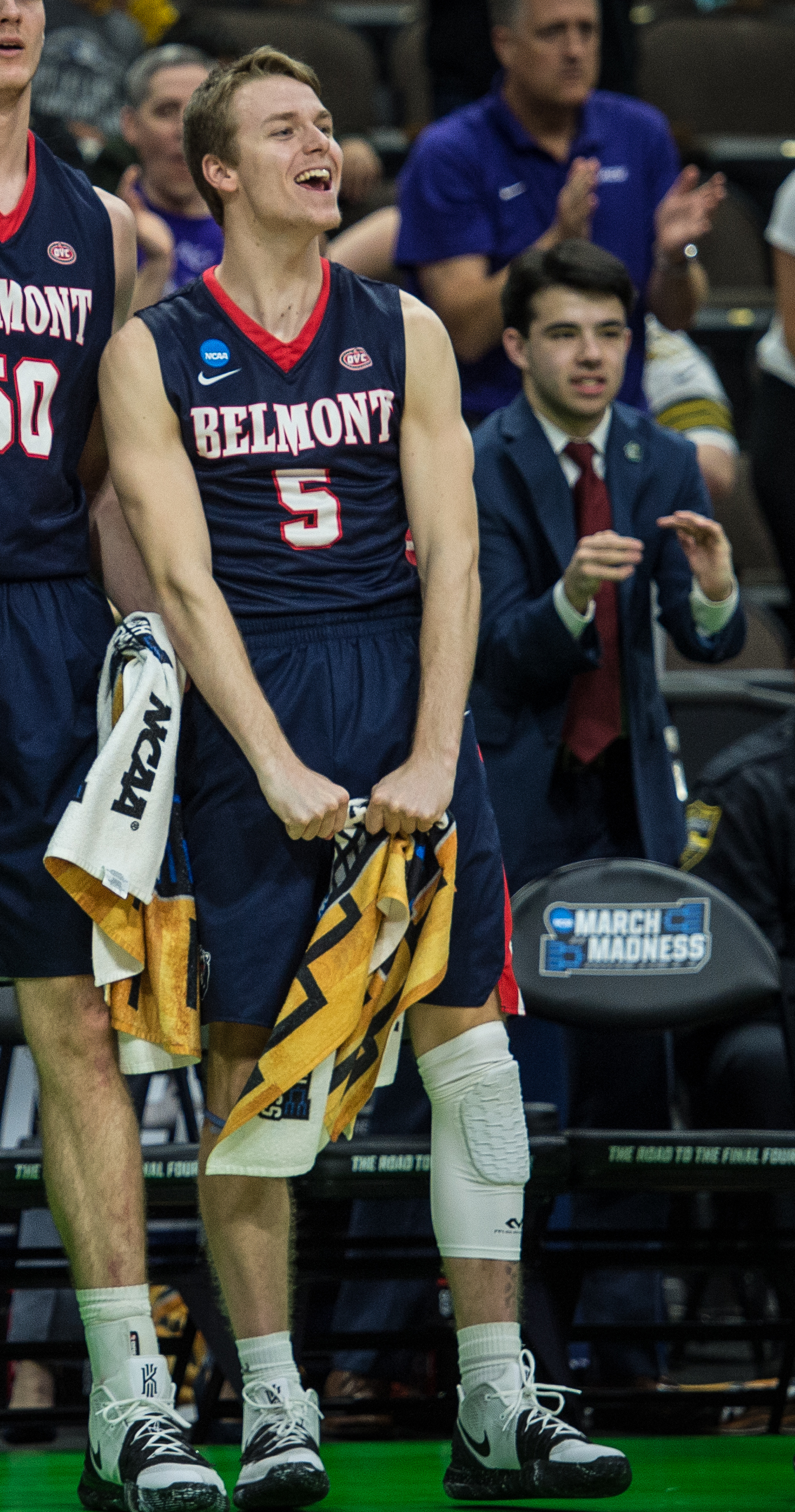

No. 3 – Phoenix Hagen
- Position: Shooting guard
- League: Basketball Bundesliga

Personal information
- Born: December 9, 1999 (age 26) Erlanger, Kentucky, U.S.
- Listed height: 6 ft 4 in (1.93 m)
- Listed weight: 195 lb (88 kg)

Career information
- High school: Randall K. Cooper (Union, Kentucky)
- College: Belmont (2018–2020); Xavier (2020–2023)
- NBA draft: 2023: undrafted
- Playing career: 2023–present

Career history
- 2023–2024: Astana
- 2024: Mexico City Capitanes
- 2024: South Bay Lakers
- 2024–2026: Zunder Palencia
- 2026–present: Phoenix Hagen

Career highlights
- NIT champion (2022); First-team All-OVC (2020)

Adam Terrence Kunkel (born December 9, 1999) is an American professional basketball player for Phoenix Hagen of the German Basketball Bundesliga (BBL). He played college basketball for the Belmont Bruins and the Xavier Musketeers.

== High school career ==
Kunkel attended Randall K. Cooper High School. As a junior, he helped his team reach the Sweet 16 title game, scoring 13 points in the loss against Bowling Green High School. Kunkel averaged 16.3 points and 3.9 rebounds per game, shooting 41 percent from three-point range. He earned Kentucky Region IX Player of the Year, Third Team Kentucky All-State, and Lexington Catholic Tournament Most Valuable Player honors. Kunkel averaged 20 points and 7.7 rebounds per game as a senior, shooting 45 percent from behind the arc. He was named First Team All-State, Kentucky Region IX Player of the Year, and was a finalist for Kentucky Mr. Basketball. Kunkel committed to Belmont in November 2017, choosing the Bruins over offers from Central Arkansas, Samford and Winthrop.

== College career ==
Kunkel expected to redshirt his freshman season at Belmont to put on weight, but instead became a rotation player. As a freshman, he averaged 2.3 points in 9.3 minutes per game. On November 16, 2019, Kunkel scored a career-high 35 points in a 100–85 win against Boston College in the Gotham Classic. As a sophomore, Kunkel averaged 16.5 points, 2.6 assists and 2.8 rebounds per game, shooting 39 percent from three-point from behind the arc. He earned First-Team All-Ohio Valley Conference honors. Kunkel's increase in his scoring average of 14.2 points per game was the second highest in Division I. Following the season, he entered the transfer portal. On July 25, Kunkel committed to Xavier over Arkansas, Creighton and Oklahoma. He was granted a waiver for immediate eligibility on December 5. Kunkel averaged 7 points and 1.6 assists per game as a junior.

== Professional career ==
=== Astana (2023–2024) ===
After going undrafted in the 2023 NBA draft, Kunkel joined Astana of the VTB United League in August 2023.

=== Mexico City Capitanes (2024) ===
On February 8, 2024, Kunkel joined the Mexico City Capitanes of the NBA G League. On March 1, 2024, he was waived by the Capitanes.

=== South Bay Lakers (2024) ===
On March 13, 2024, Kunkel joined the South Bay Lakers.

=== Zunder Palencia (2024–2026) ===
On July 23, 2024, Kunkel signed with Zunder Palencia of the Primera FEB.

=== Phoenix Hagen (2026–present) ===
On July 21, 2026, he signed with Phoenix Hagen of the German Basketball Bundesliga (BBL).

== Career statistics ==
Legend
GP	Games played	GS	Games started	MPG	Minutes per game
FG%	Field goal percentage	3P%	3-point field goal percentage	FT%	Free throw percentage
RPG	Rebounds per game	APG	Assists per game	SPG	Steals per game
BPG	Blocks per game	PPG	Points per game	**Bold**	Career high

=== College ===
Year	Team	GP	GS	MPG	FG%	3P%	FT%	RPG	APG	SPG	BPG	PPG
2018–19	Belmont	25	0	9.3	.321	.275	.867	.6	.7	.4	.1	2.3
2019–20	Belmont	**33**	**33**	**29.8**	**.433**	**.390**	.821	**2.8**	**2.6**	.9	**.2**	**16.5**
2020–21	Xavier	16	4	18.8	.398	.265	**.889**	1.3	1.6	**1.0**	**.2**	7.0
2021–22	Xavier	34	4	23.3	.374	.333	.755	2.2	1.8	.8	.1	8.8
2022–23	Xavier	35	32	30.3	.460	.425	.872	2.7	3.0	1.1	.1	10.9
Career		143	73	23.5	.418	.364	.820	2.1	2.1	.9	.1	9.7
