= The Point, Louisville =

Neighborhood in Louisville, Kentucky

Coordinates: 38°15′39″N 85°43′45″W

The Point was a thriving 19th century neighborhood in Louisville, Kentucky, east of Downtown Louisville and opposite Towhead Island along the Ohio River. It was also located north of the present day Butchertown area.

== Overview ==
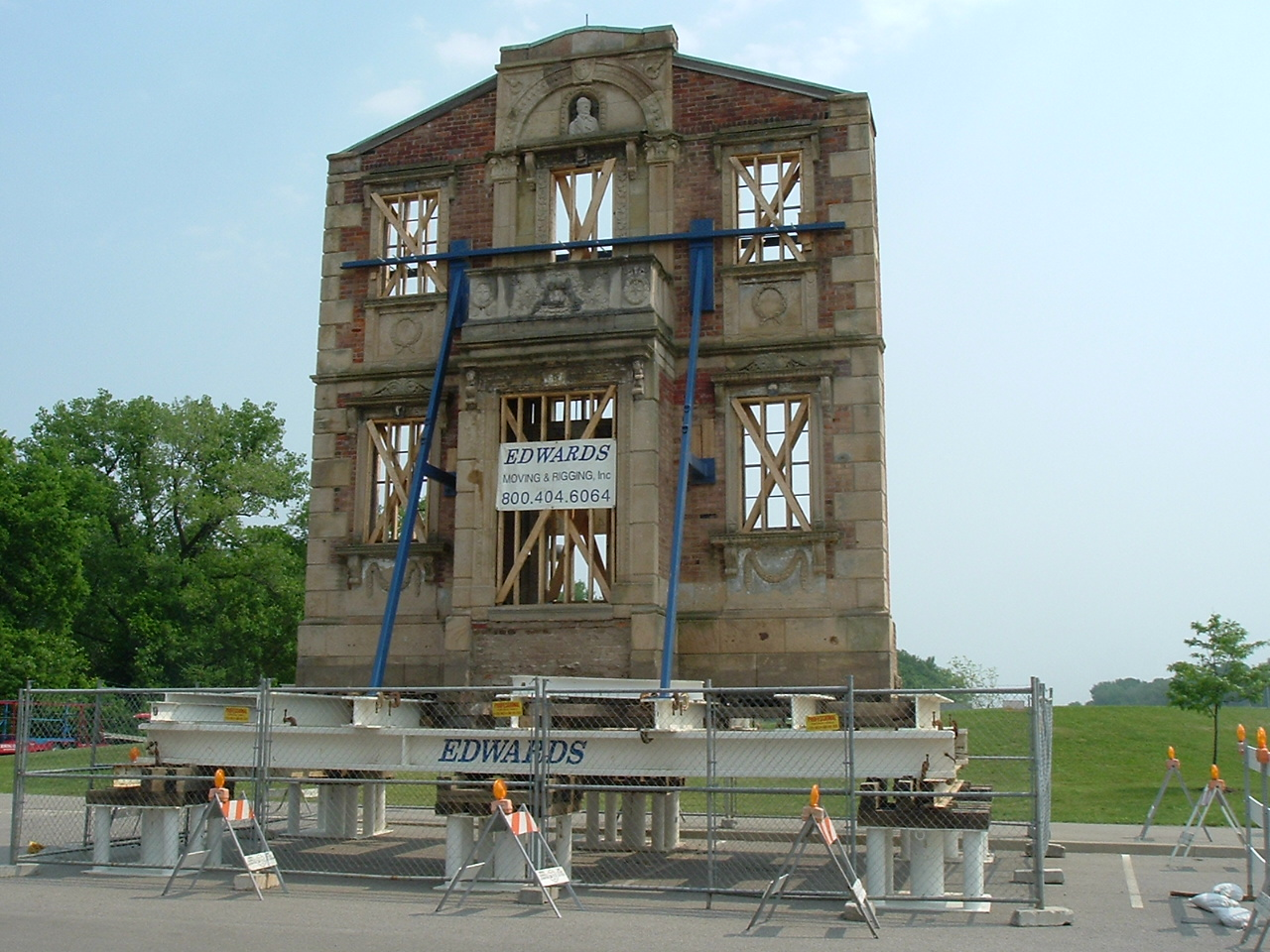
The facade of the Heigold House is being moved from its Fulton Street location to make room for the massive River Park Place condominium project

Starting in the 1840s it was home to many upper income residents who had moved from New Orleans, giving the area on Fulton Street the nickname "the Frenchmen's Row". They built many mansion houses in the area, the best known of which was the Heigold House (completed in 1853), which featured a very detailed facade with the faces of early American leaders engraved on it. It was built by immigrant stonemason Christian Heigold.

In 1854 many houses were demolished when Beargrass Creek was rerouted from its original outflow near 4th Street in downtown Louisville to its current location through the area. Many more houses were torn down after the great Ohio River flood of 1937. It was also the site of The Louisville Municipal Yacht Basin (later Municipal Boat Harbor) built in 1936.

Contemporary Louisville leaders of the time wanted the entire area depopulated and replaced with a park called Point Park Project, which was done to the extreme northern part of the area, now called Thruston Park. This remained the preferred urban public park throughout the 1940s and 50s. The park was severely disrupted by the construction of I-64 in the early 1960s and by the 1980s, it was in a neglected and dismal state. The harbor remained until it was closed by the city in 2005.

Today only two remaining historical structures remain. The first is the decorated front facade of the Heigold House, which originated in the former Ohio Street neighborhood's Marion Street (present location of the Waterfront Botanical Gardens). Secondly, the Paget House, the last remaining of the riverfront mansions along Fulton Street. Both are listed on the National Register of Historic Places. The Heigold facade was moved to a roundabout on Frankfort Avenue near River Road, while the fate of the historic Paget House remains uncertain, but remains across River Road on the River Park Place development property.

== See also ==
- History of Louisville, Kentucky
