= Jane's Saddlebag =

- Interactive map of the Jane's Saddlebag area

General information
- Location: Union, Kentucky, United States
- Coordinates: 38.85859°N 84.77567°W

Technical details
- Floor count: 1

Jane's Saddlebag was a restaurant near Big Bone Lick State Park in Union, Kentucky. It was styled as a "hands on" historic educational experience, with an old restored "Saddlebag" home, original stone smokehouse, and a life size replica of a 1700s-style flat boat. The Jane's Saddlebag house was completely refurbished in 2003 and maintained most of its original "saddlebag" style qualities. In November 2024 the property was listed for sale.

== Saddlebag Style House ==
The house on the property is a restored historical structure in which preserves its original qualities. The house is a saddlebag style house, also known as a "Double-pen" house. This style of housing is a step up from the normal tenant houses on the larger farms in Kentucky. They are commonly spotted for their characteristic double doors on the front of the house.

== Smokehouse ==
Also on site, is an original historic smokehouse built of large grey stones. The smokehouse on the property was built in the 1800s and was used by Kentucky farmers to shelter the process of curing their meat.

== Flatboat ==
Located just behind the Jane's Saddlebag building is a replica of a 1700s flatboat used by the early settlers wanting to travel further west down the river. This flatboat is available for any visitor to tour and view how early settlers would travel the river to their destinations. The flatboat was the cheapest mode of transportation for settlers and was mainly used for shorter one-way trips to their homes and then eventually broken down and used for lumber. The flatboat represents the mode of transportation that the settlers Lewis and Clark used to travel the river. The nearby Big Bone State Park is a Lewis and Clark national historic trail site.
