= 2020–21 Xavier Musketeers men's basketball team =

American college basketball season

2020–21 Xavier Musketeers men's basketball
- Conference: Big East Conference
- Record: 13–8 (6–7 Big East)
- Head coach: Travis Steele (3rd season)
- Assistant coaches: Jonas Hayes (3rd season); Ben Johnson (3rd season); Dante Jackson (3rd season)
- Home arena: Cintas Center

2020–21 Big East men's basketball standings
	Conf.				Overall
Team	W		L	PCT	W		L	PCT
No. 18 Villanova	11	–	4	.733	18	–	7	.720
No. 19 Creighton	14	–	6	.700	22	–	9	.710
UConn	11	–	6	.647	15	–	8	.652
St. John's	10	–	9	.526	16	–	11	.593
Seton Hall	10	–	9	.526	14	–	13	.519
Providence	9	–	10	.474	13	–	13	.500
Xavier	6	–	7	.462	13	–	8	.619
Georgetown †	7	–	9	.438	13	–	13	.500
Marquette	8	–	11	.421	13	–	14	.481
Butler	8	–	12	.400	10	–	15	.400
DePaul	2	–	13	.133	5	–	14	.263
† 2021 Big East tournament winner Rankings from AP poll

The 2020–21 Xavier Musketeers men's basketball team represented Xavier University during the 2020–21 NCAA Division I men's basketball season as a member of the Big East Conference. Led by third-year head coach Travis Steele, they played their home games at the Cintas Center in Cincinnati, Ohio. They finished the season 13–8, 6–7 in Big East Play to finish in 7th place. They lost in the first round of the Big East tournament to Butler.

== Previous season ==
The Musketeers finished the 2019–20 season 19–13, 8–10 in Big East play to finish tied for sixth place. As the No. 7 seed in the Big East tournament, Xavier was defeated by DePaul in the first round. The next day, the remainder of the Big East tournament and all other postseason tournaments were canceled due to the ongoing coronavirus pandemic.

== Offseason ==
=== Departures ===
Name	Number	Pos.	Height	Weight	Year	Hometown	Reason for departure
Dahmir Bishop	2	G	6'5"	178	Freshman	Philadelphia, PA	Transferred to Saint Joseph's (mid-season)
Quentin Goodin	3	G	6'4"	194	Senior	Campbellsville, KY	Graduated
Tyrique Jones	4	F	6'9"	239	Senior	Bloomfield, CT	Graduated
Leighton Schrand	10	G	6'2"	166	Senior	Villa Hills, KY	Graduated
Bryce Moore	11	G	6'3"	194	Graduate Student	Indianapolis, IN	Completed college eligibility (Note: Moore was a graduate transfer in the 2019–20 season, having graduated from Western Michigan in 2019.)
Dontarius James	12	F	6'7"	228	Sophomore	Kershaw, SC	Transferred to Jacksonville State
Naji Marshall	13	F	6'7"	220	Junior	Atlantic City, NJ	Declared for NBA draft
Myles Hanson	34	G	6'7"	215	RS Sophomore	Chaska, MN	Walk-on; transferred to Stonehill College

=== Incoming transfers ===
Name	Pos.	Height	Weight	Year	Hometown	Previous School
Nate Johnson	G	6'3"	180	Graduate Student	Miami, FL	Transferred from Gardner-Webb after graduating. Will have one year of eligibility beginning immediately.
Bryan Griffin	F	6'8"	230	Graduate Student	Pomona, NY	Transferred from Mercy College after graduating. Will have one year of eligibility beginning immediately.
Adam Kunkel	G	6'3"	165	Junior	Hebron, KY	Transferred from Belmont. Kunkel was granted a waiver for immediate eligibility. Will have two years of remaining eligibility.
Ben Stanley	F	6'6"	225	RS Junior	Baltimore, MD	Transferred from Hampton. Stanley was granted a waiver for immediate eligibility on December 16. Will have two years of remaining eligibility.

=== Recruiting classes ===
==== 2020 recruiting class ====
College recruiting information
Name	Hometown	School	Height	Weight	Commit date
Dwon Odom; PG	Alpharetta, GA	St. Francis HS	6 ft 1 in (1.85 m)	180 lb (82 kg)	Jul 29, 2018
Dwon Odom; PG	Recruit ratings: Scout: Rivals: 247Sports:				
C. J. Wilcher; SG	Roselle, NJ	Roselle Catholic HS	6 ft 5 in (1.96 m)	195 lb (88 kg)	Jun 7, 2019
C. J. Wilcher; SG	Recruit ratings: Scout: Rivals: 247Sports:				
Colby Jones; SG	Birmingham, AL	Mountain Brook HS	6 ft 6 in (1.98 m)	195 lb (88 kg)	Aug 14, 2019
Colby Jones; SG	Recruit ratings: Scout: Rivals: 247Sports:				
Overall recruit ranking:
Note: In many cases, Scout, Rivals, 247Sports, On3, and ESPN may conflict in their listings of height and weight.; In these cases, the average was taken. ESPN grades are on a 100-point scale.; Sources: "Xavier 2020 Basketball Commitments". Rivals.; "2020 Xavier Musketeers Recruiting Class". ESPN.; "2020 Team Ranking". Rivals.; "Xavier 2020 Basketball Commits". 247Sports.

==== 2021 recruiting class ====
College recruiting information (2021)
Name	Hometown	School	Height	Weight	Commit date
Cesare Edwards; PF	Hartsville, SC	Hartsville HS	6 ft 10 in (2.08 m)	205 lb (93 kg)	Jun 26, 2020
Cesare Edwards; PF	Recruit ratings: Scout: Rivals: 247Sports:				
Elijah Tucker; PF	Canton, GA	Cherokee HS	6 ft 7 in (2.01 m)	190 lb (86 kg)	Aug 14, 2020
Elijah Tucker; PF	Recruit ratings: Scout: Rivals: 247Sports:				
Overall recruit ranking:
Note: In many cases, Scout, Rivals, 247Sports, On3, and ESPN may conflict in their listings of height and weight.; In these cases, the average was taken. ESPN grades are on a 100-point scale.; Sources: "Xavier 2021 Basketball Commitments". Rivals.; "2021 Xavier Musketeers Recruiting Class". ESPN.; "2021 Team Ranking". Rivals.; "Xavier 2021 Basketball Commits". 247Sports.

== Roster ==
2020–21 Xavier Musketeers men's basketball team
Players
Coaches

Pos.	#	Name	Height	Weight	Year	Previous school	Hometown
G	0	C. J. Wilcher	6 ft 5 in (1.96 m)	195 lb (88 kg)	Fr	Roselle Catholic HS	Roselle, NJ
G	1	Paul Scruggs	6 ft 4 in (1.93 m)	196 lb (89 kg)	Sr	Prolific Prep	Indianapolis, IN
F	2	Daniel Ramsey	6 ft 9 in (2.06 m)	233 lb (106 kg)	So	Norcross HS	Cordele, GA
G	3	Colby Jones	6 ft 5 in (1.96 m)	195 lb (88 kg)	Fr	Mountain Brook HS	Birmingham, AL
G	5	Adam Kunkel	6 ft 4 in (1.93 m)	176 lb (80 kg)	Jr	Belmont	Hebron, KY
G	10	Nate Johnson	6 ft 4 in (1.93 m)	195 lb (88 kg)	GS	Gardner-Webb	Miami, FL
G	11	Dwon Odom	6 ft 1 in (1.85 m)	180 lb (82 kg)	Fr	St. Francis HS	Alpharetta, GA
F	13	Bryan Griffin	6 ft 8 in (2.03 m)	230 lb (104 kg)	GS	Mercy College	Pomona, NY
F	14	Ben Stanley	6 ft 6 in (1.98 m)	230 lb (104 kg)	RS Jr	Hampton	Baltimore, MD
G	15	Spencer Cody (W)	6 ft 0 in (1.83 m)	170 lb (77 kg)	Jr	DePaul Prep	Chicago, IL
G	20	Ramon Singh (W)	6 ft 4 in (1.93 m)	187 lb (85 kg)	Jr	La Lumiere School	Sydney, Australia
G	21	Zak Swetye (W)	6 ft 1 in (1.85 m)	170 lb (77 kg)	Jr	Darien HS	Darien, CT
F	22	Dieonte Miles	6 ft 10 in (2.08 m)	220 lb (100 kg)	RS Fr	Walton-Verona HS	Walton, KY
G	24	KyKy Tandy	6 ft 2 in (1.88 m)	190 lb (86 kg)	So	University Heights Academy	Hopkinsville, KY
F	25	Jason Carter	6 ft 8 in (2.03 m)	227 lb (103 kg)	RS Sr	Ohio	Johnstown, OH
F	32	Zach Freemantle	6 ft 9 in (2.06 m)	225 lb (102 kg)	So	Bergen Catholic HS	Teaneck, NJ

Head coach

- Travis Steele (Butler)

Assistant coach(es)

- Jonas Hayes (Georgia)
- Ben Johnson (Minnesota)
- Dante Jackson (Xavier)

Legend

- (C) Team captain
- (S) Suspended
- (I) Ineligible
- (W) Walk-on
- Injured
- Current redshirt

Roster

== Schedule and results ==
Date time, TV	Rank^{#}	Opponent^{#}	Result	Record	High points	High rebounds	High assists	Site (attendance) city, state
Non-conference regular season
November 25, 2020*; 12:00 p.m., FS1		Oakland; Xavier Invitational	W 101–49	1–0	21 – Freemantle	12 – Freemantle	8 – Scruggs	Cintas Center (300); Cincinnati, OH
November 26, 2020*; 12:00 p.m., FS1		Bradley; Xavier Invitational	W 51–50	2–0	19 – Freemantle	11 – Carter	7 – Scruggs	Cintas Center (300); Cincinnati, OH
November 27, 2020*; 12:00 p.m., GoXavier.com		Toledo; Xavier Invitational	W 76–73	3–0	24 – Tandy	13 – Carter	7 – Scruggs	Cintas Center (300); Cincinnati, OH
November 30, 2020*; 7:00 p.m., FS1		Eastern Kentucky	W 99–96 ^{OT}	4–0	24 – Freemantle	13 – Freemantle	6 – Odom	Cintas Center (300); Cincinnati, OH
December 2, 2020*; 7:00 p.m., FS1		Tennessee Tech	W 79–48	5–0	14 – Johnson	12 – Carter	9 – Scruggs	Cintas Center (300); Cincinnati, OH
December 6, 2020*; 3:00 p.m., ESPN		at Cincinnati; Crosstown Shootout	W 77–69	6–0	20 – Scruggs	9 – Freemantle	5 – Scruggs	Fifth Third Arena (300); Cincinnati, OH
December 9, 2020*; 8:00 p.m., FS1		Oklahoma; Big East/Big 12 Battle	W 99–77	7–0	28 – Freemantle	6 – Johnson	8 – Scruggs	Cintas Center; Cincinnati, OH
Big East regular season
December 12, 2020; 6:30 p.m., FS2		at Providence	Postponed due to COVID-19; rescheduled for February 24					Alumni Hall (–); Providence, RI
December 18, 2020; 2:00 p.m., FS1		at DePaul	Postponed due to COVID-19; rescheduled for February 3					Wintrust Arena (–); Chicago, IL
December 20, 2020; 2:00 p.m., FS1		Marquette	W 91–88	8–0 (1–0)	29 – Scruggs	7 – Freemantle	6 – Scruggs	Cintas Center (300); Cincinnati, OH
December 23, 2020; 3:00 p.m., FS1	No. 22	at No. 13 Creighton	L 61–66	8–1 (1–1)	12 – Johnson	6 – Jones	4 – Scruggs	CHI Health Center Omaha (1,673); Omaha, NE
December 30, 2020; 7:00 p.m., FS1		Seton Hall	L 68–85	8–2 (1–2)	20 – Freemantle	9 – Freemantle	8 – Scruggs	Cintas Center (300); Cincinnati, OH
January 2, 2021; 2:00 p.m., FS1		No. 4 Villanova	Postponed due to the COVID-19 pandemic; rescheduled for January 13					Cintas Center (–); Cincinnati, OH
January 6, 2021; 8:00 p.m., CBSSN		St. John's	W 69–60	9–2 (2–2)	16 – Jones	16 – Carter	3 – Tied	Cintas Center (300); Cincinnati, OH
January 10, 2021; 11:00 a.m., FOX		Providence	W 74–73	10–2 (3–2)	17 – Freemantle	8 – Freemantle	5 – Kunkel	Cintas Center (300); Cincinnati, OH
January 13, 2021; 6:30 p.m., FS1		Villanova	Canceled due to COVID-19					Cintas Center (–); Cincinnati, OH
January 16, 2021; 3:30 p.m., CBSSN		at Seton Hall	Canceled due to COVID-19					Prudential Center (–); Newark, NJ
January 20, 2021; 8:30 p.m., CBSSN		at No. 23 Connecticut	Canceled due to COVID-19					Harry A. Gampel Pavilion (–); Storrs, CT
January 26, 2021; 6:30 p.m., FS1		Georgetown	Canceled due to COVID-19					Cintas Center (–); Cincinnati, OH
January 29, 2021; 6:30 p.m., FS1		at Butler	W 68–55	11–2 (4–2)	24 – Scruggs	10 – Freemantle	3 – Scruggs	Hinkle Fieldhouse (2,084); Indianapolis, IN
February 3, 2021; 5:00 p.m., FS1		at DePaul	Canceled due to COVID-19					Wintrust Arena (–); Chicago, IL
February 7, 2021; 2:30 p.m., FOX		at No. 3 Villanova	Canceled due to COVID-19					Finneran Pavilion (–); Villanova, PA
February 11, 2021; 3:30 p.m., FS1		DePaul	Canceled due to COVID-19					Cintas Center (–); Cincinnati, OH
February 13, 2021; 12:00 p.m., FOX		Connecticut	L 72–80	11–3 (4–3)	30 – Freemantle	15 – Freemantle	12 – Scruggs	Cintas Center (922); Cincinnati, OH
February 16, 2021; 8:30 p.m., FS1		at St. John's	L 84–93	11–4 (4–4)	22 – Freemantle	10 – Freemantle	6 – Tied	Carnesecca Arena (0); Queens, NY
February 21, 2021; 7:00 p.m., FS1		Butler	W 63–51	12–4 (5–4)	17 – Freemantle	11 – Jones	6 – Scruggs	Cintas Center (922); Cincinnati, OH
February 24, 2021; 9:00 p.m., FS1		at Providence	L 68–83	12–5 (5–5)	24 – Freemantle	12 – Freemantle	3 – Tied	Alumni Hall (0); Providence, RI
February 27, 2021; 5:00 p.m., FOX		No. 13 Creighton	W 77–69	13–5 (6–5)	23 – Scruggs	11 – Freemantle	5 – Scruggs	Cintas Center (922); Cincinnati, OH
March 2, 2021; 7:00 p.m., FS1		at Georgetown	L 66–72	13–6 (6–6)	14 – Tandy	12 – Freemantle	4 – Jones	Capital One Arena (0); Washington, D.C.
March 7, 2021; 9:00 p.m., FS1		at Marquette	L 59–66	13–7 (6–7)	18 – Scruggs	6 – Tied	3 – 3 Tied	Fiserv Forum (1,800); Milwaukee, WI
Big East tournament
March 10, 2021; 6:00 p.m, FS1	(7)	vs. (10) Butler; First round	L 69–70	13–8	14 – Tied	9 – Jones	4 – Tied	Madison Square Garden (–); New York, NY
*Non-conference game. ^{#}Rankings from AP Poll. (#) Tournament seedings in parentheses. All times are in Eastern Time.

== Rankings ==
Ranking movements Legend: ██ Increase in ranking ██ Decrease in ranking — = Not ranked RV = Received votes т = Tied with team above or below
	Week																				
Poll	Pre	1	2	3	4	5	6	7	8	9	10	11	12	13	14	15	16	17	18	19	Final
AP	—	—	RV	RV	22	RV	RV	RV	RV	RV	RV	RV									
Coaches	—	—^	RV	RV	22	20T	RV	RV	RV	RV											

^Coaches did not release a Week 1 poll.
