= Waterfront Botanical Gardens =

Botanical garden in Louisville, Kentucky

Waterfont Botanical Gardens
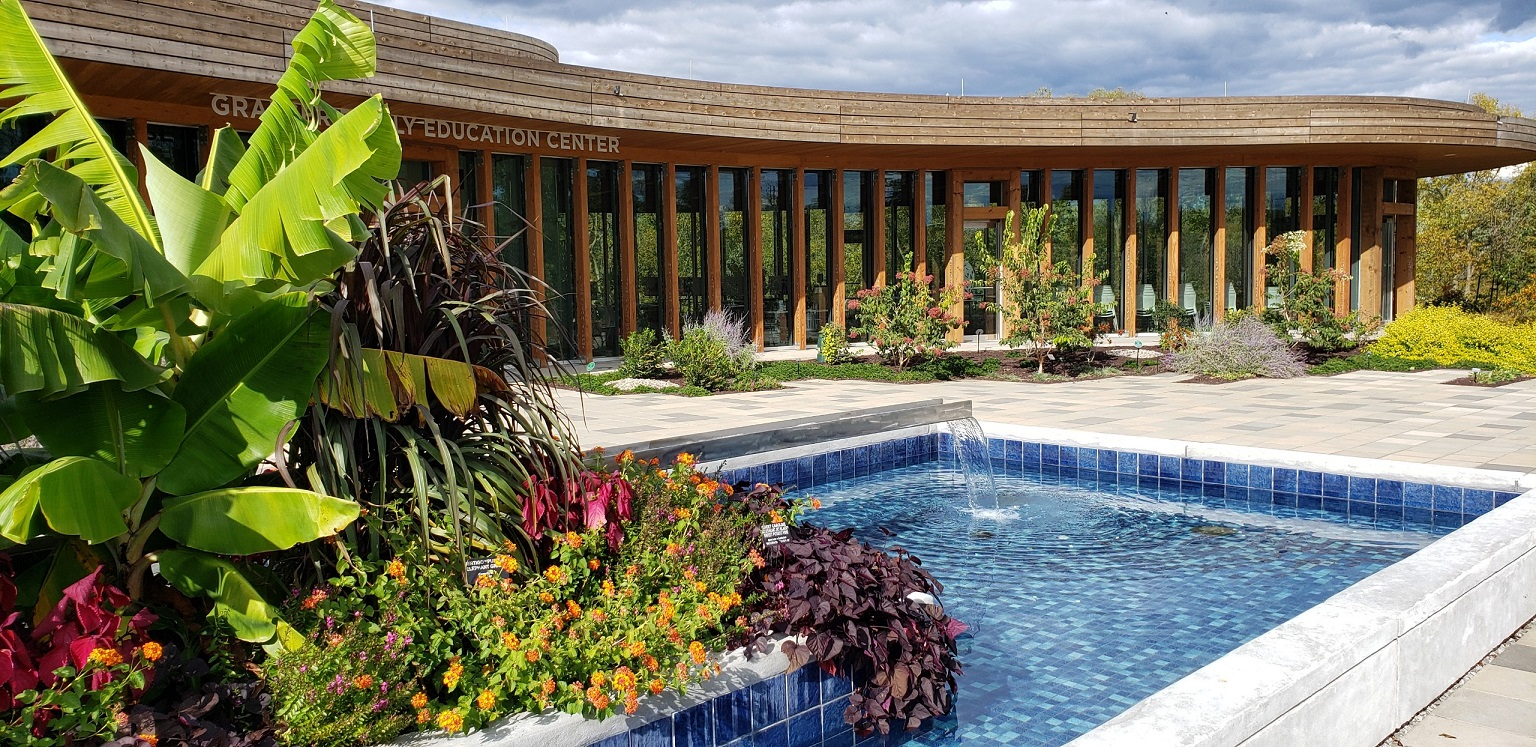
- Graeser Family Education Center at Waterfront Botanical Gardens
- Interactive map of Waterfont Botanical Gardens
- Type: Botanical
- Location: 1435 Frankfort Avenue, Louisville, Kentucky
- Coordinates: 38°15′48.13″N 85°43′26.25″W
- Area: 23 acres (9.3 ha)
- Opened: October 4, 2019; 6 years ago
- Status: Open year-round
- Species: 133 (55 native)
- Parking: Free parking
- Website: waterfrontgardens.org

The Waterfront Botanical Gardens is an urban botanical garden in Louisville, Kentucky. The botanical garden occupies 23 acres (9.3 ha) in the Butchertown neighborhood east of Downtown Louisville along Beargrass Creek. It was planned to be built in phases with Phase 2A currently in development. The first phase opened on October 4, 2019, including the Graeser Family Education Center and the Mary Lee Duthie Gardens. Phase 1 was completed in 2021.

A plant survey coducted by Botanica in 2014 documented the native and invasive plants on the site. Botanist Patricia Haragan led the study which found 133 species, including 57 native plants.

In October 2024, local and state funding was announced for expanison of Phase 2A which will include a Japanese Garden, Bonsai garden, tree allée and the Beargrass Creek Overlook, among other projects.

In March 2026, Phase 2A of construction was slated to begin in the spring 2026. With the grant of $500,000 from the James Graham Brown Foundation, the WBG has raised $9.3 million towards its goal of $10.5 million, leaving $1.2 million remaining to raise for its next big expansion.

In May 2026, the expansion broke ground on Phase 2A of its four-phase Master Plan. The project features a bonsai garden, a bonsai house, and has hired its first-ever Bonsai Curator. Additionally, there will be a Tree Allée, a Beargrass Creek Overlook, and the completion on the Beargrass Creek Pathway loop. The grand opening for this expansion is planned for Spring 2027.

== History ==
During the early history of the city, the region the botanical garden sits was a neighborhood known as The Point. As a result of its location along the Ohio River, the region flooded repeatedly throughout the 19th and early 20th centuries, including in 1883, 1913 and 1937. Most houses in the neighborhood were destroyed from the flooding.

In 1953 the city of Louisville purchased property in the area to create a city dump, eventually becoming the Ohio Street Dump. The dump was expanded until Interstate 71 was constructed in the late 1960s and the city began closing the dump site. The dump was closed in 1973 after another landfill was constructed. The site was left mostly abandoned until the site was selected as the location of the botanical gardens in the late 2000s. On September 15, 2017, a groundbreaking ceremony started the Phase 1 construction which was completed in December 2023.

== See also ==
- List of botanical gardens in the United States
- List of botanical gardens and arboretums in Kentucky
