= Ben Stanley =

American basketball player (born 1998)

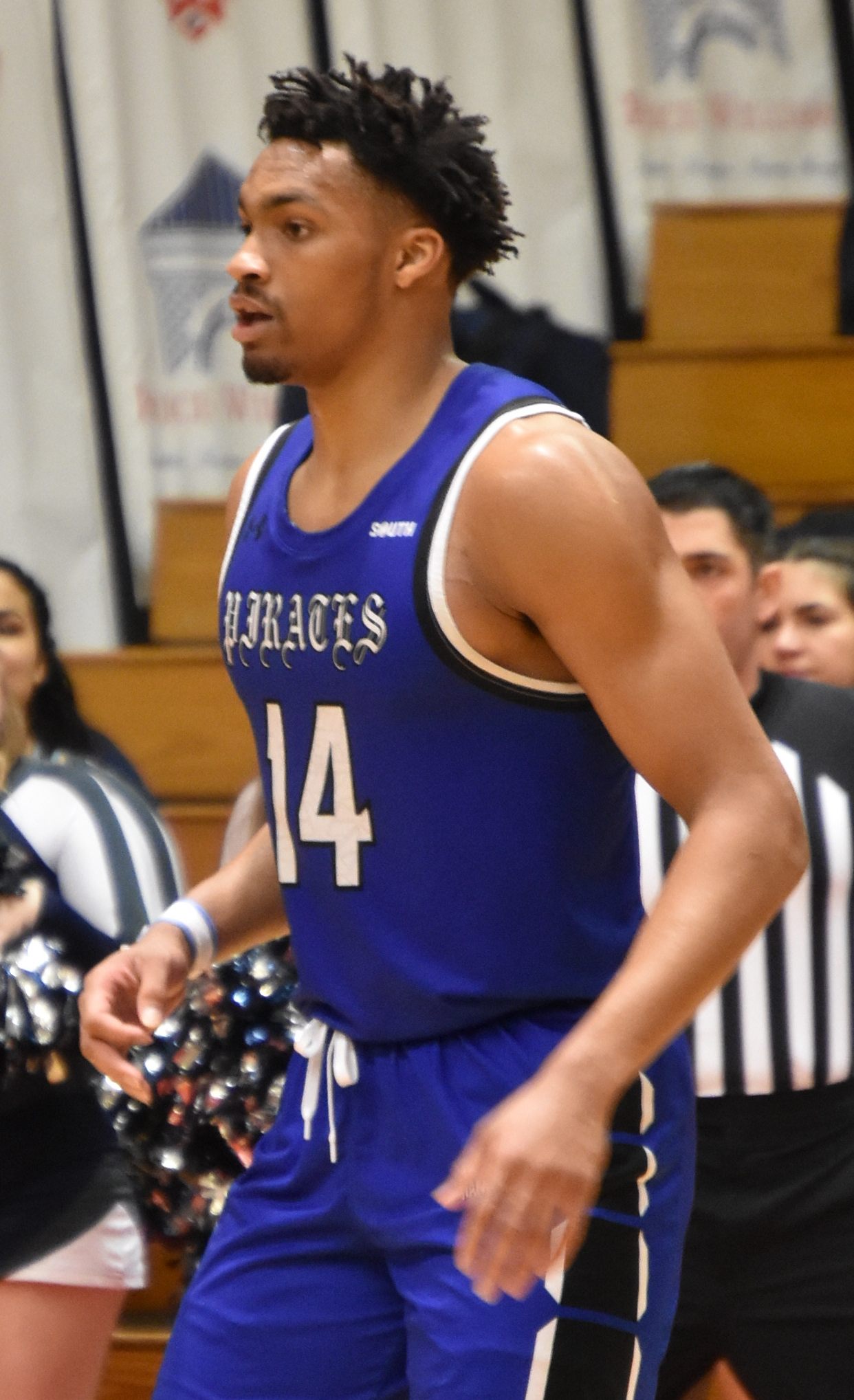
- Stanley with Hampton in March 2020

Free agent
- Position: Small forward / power forward

Personal information
- Born: March 12, 1998 (age 28) Syracuse, New York, U.S.
- Listed height: 6 ft 7 in (2.01 m)
- Listed weight: 235 lb (107 kg)

Career information
- High school: Our Lady of Mount Carmel (Essex, Maryland); Baltimore City College (Baltimore, Maryland); Millwood School (Midlothian, Virginia)
- College: Hampton (2018–2020); Xavier (2020–2022); Old Dominion (2022–2023)
- NBA draft: 2023: undrafted

Career highlights
- NIT champion (2022); First-team All-Big South (2020)

Benjamin Alfred Stanley (born March 12, 1998) is an American professional basketball player for LTH CASTINGS SKOFJA LOKA of the Slovenian Basketball League. He played college basketball for the Hampton Pirates, Xavier Musketeers and the Old Dominion Monarchs.

== Early life ==
Stanley was born in Syracuse, New York and moved with his family to Baltimore, Maryland while in fifth grade. He played basketball for Our Lady of Mount Carmel School in Essex, Maryland for two years and Baltimore City College for one year. After reclassifying to the 2017 class, Stanley transferred to Millwood School in Midlothian, Virginia. In his senior season, he averaged 15 points, eight rebounds and three assists per game. Stanley competed for Maryland 3D and Team Loaded on the Amateur Athletic Union circuit. He chose to play college basketball for Hampton over scholarship offers from Longwood, Maryland Eastern Shore and Wagner, among others.

== College career ==
=== Hampton ===
Stanley was forced to redshirt his first season at Hampton because of transcript issues. During his redshirt year, he became more comfortable handling the ball with his right hand. Stanley came off the bench in his freshman season, averaging 4.4 points and 2.9 rebounds per game. He became a regular starter as a sophomore and was placed in a leading role after Jermaine Marrow was sidelined with a broken hand in November 2019. On December 5, Stanley scored a career-high 40 points and grabbed 11 rebounds in a 94–91 overtime loss to Howard. On December 28, he recorded 33 points, six rebounds, five blocks and three assists in a 70–67 win over Saint Peter's. Stanley and Jermaine Marrow were labeled the "best scoring duo in college basketball" by HBCU Gameday. In his sophomore season, he averaged 22 points, 7.2 rebounds and 1.5 blocks per game and shot 57.4 percent from the field, earning First Team All-Big South honors. Stanley ranked ninth in the NCAA Division I in scoring. On July 7, 2020, he entered the NCAA transfer portal. He also declared for the 2020 NBA draft before withdrawing.

=== Xavier ===
On July 29, 2020, Stanley announced that he would continue his college career at Xavier, choosing the Musketeers over offers from Dayton and Oregon, among others. He filed a waiver for immediate eligibility.

=== Old Dominion ===
On April 28, 2022, Stanley announced that he would continue his college career at Old Dominion.

== Professional career ==
After going undrafted in the 2023 NBA draft, Stanley signed with the Grand Rapids Gold on October 28, 2024. However, he was waived on November 4.

On November 30, 2024, Stanley signed a professional contract with KK Škofja Loka of the Slovenian Basketball League (also known as Liga OTP banka due to sponsorship reasons) a top level European basketball league in Slovenia.

== Career statistics ==
Legend
| GP | Games played | GS | Games started | MPG | Minutes per game |
| FG% | Field goal percentage | 3P% | 3-point field goal percentage | FT% | Free throw percentage |
| RPG | Rebounds per game | APG | Assists per game | SPG | Steals per game |
| BPG | Blocks per game | PPG | Points per game | **Bold** | Career high |

=== College ===
| Year | Team | GP | GS | MPG | FG% | 3P% | FT% | RPG | APG | SPG | BPG | PPG |
|---|---|---|---|---|---|---|---|---|---|---|---|---|
| 2017–18 | Hampton | Redshirt | | | | | | | | | | |
| 2018–19 | Hampton | 33 | 2 | 10.5 | **.590** | **.500** | .591 | 2.9 | .1 | .1 | .5 | 4.4 |
| 2019–20 | Hampton | **34** | **33** | **35.1** | .574 | .333 | .643 | **7.2** | **.7** | **.4** | **1.5** | **22.0** |
| 2020–21 | Xavier | 4 | 0 | 9.5 | .500 | .000 | **.667** | 1.8 | .3 | .0 | .3 | 6.0 |
| 2021–22 | Xavier | 9 | 1 | 6.6 | .318 | .167 | .600 | 1.3 | .3 | .1 | .1 | 2.0 |
| 2022–23 | Old Dominion | 21 | 19 | 22.9 | .439 | .200 | .579 | 3.8 | .3 | .3 | .3 | 9.7 |
| Career | | 101 | 55 | 20.9 | .537 | .275 | .625 | 2.9 | .4 | .3 | .7 | 11.3 |

== Personal life ==
Stanley comes from a religious family and credits God for working behind the scenes on his behalf.
