= Richwood Presbyterian Church =

Church in Kentucky, United States

Richwood Presbyterian Church, is the oldest Presbyterian Church in the Northern Kentucky tri county area and is located at 1070 Richwood Road, in Walton, Boone County, Kentucky. The Church was founded in 1834 by 13 members. The original 1844 church burned and the present church was built in 1870. The church was rebuilt by both black and white members. Church records include the baptism of Margaret Garner, who attempted to escape from slavery in 1856.

Richwood Presbyterian Church is a Kentucky Historic Landmark. Today this church is active, with a membership of about 60, and also is home to a private Montessori preschool. The Church is adjacent to a natural rock walled cemetery which is equally historic.
