= Union Fire Protection District =

- Address: 9611 U.S. Hwy 42 Union, KY 41091

Agency overview
- Established: 1969
- Employees: 65
- Staffing: paid and volunteer
- Fire chief: Aaron Gruelle
- Deputy Chief Joe Maher
- Asst. Chief Melanie Lawson
- EMS level: ALS
- IAFF: 5038
- Motto: We care for our community

Facilities and equipment
- Stations: 3
- Engines: 3
- Trucks: 1
- Quints: 1
- Ambulances: 3

The Union Fire Protection District, abbreviated UFPD and also known as Union Fire/Rescue, has primary responsibility for fire suppression and emergency medical services for the city of Union, Kentucky and outlying areas. The Union Fire Department was established in 1969. The Union Ambulance District was founded September 10, 1989. The two departments were united in 2000.

The Fire Chief is currently Chief Aaron Gruelle.

== History ==
On January 21, 2012, Union firefighters responded to a call at Bill's Carpet on Longbranch Road in Union. Finding a bigger fire than expected, more crews from Burlington, Hebron, Erlanger, and Walton were dispatched. The Florence Fire/EMS Department had already deployed to the fire. TANK buses were brought in to serve as rest areas for crews, which rotated approximately every 15 to 20 minutes.

On 3 May 2012, fire crews responded to a home in Union, near Station 2. Firefighters were required to truck in water using one of the two tankers the department has. The family assumed that because they lived across the street from a fire hydrant, that it could be used. Upon being asked by reporters, Chief Michael Morgan replied "Believe it or not, the hydrants here on Beaver Road cannot be used due to the water pressure being too high." The Boone County Water District has provided an apparatus for the UFPD to use. When asked about why the apparatus was not used, Chief Morgan replied simply, "The apparatus provided by the water district does not lower the pressure enough." The issue remains to this day.

== Fire stations and apparatus ==
UFPD operates three engines, one aerial ladder truck, three ambulances, one tanker, one brush truck, one utility truck, and three command vehicles out of three stations.

Note: For units without a number listed it is still undetermined how they will be renumbered

Unit	Type	ALS or BLS Ambulance	Address	Station No.
Engine 71	Pumper, First Responder Engine	N/A	9611 U.S. Hwy 42	71
Engine 72	Engine Co.	N/A	1976 New Haven School Rd.	72
Engine 74	Engine Co.	N/A	9611 U.S. Hwy 42	71
Ladder 71	Ladder Co.	N/A	9611 U.S. Hwy 42	71
Squad 73	Ambulance (Reserve)	ALS	9611 U.S. Hwy 42	71
Squad 71	Ambulance	ALS	9611 U.S. Hwy 42	71
Squad 72	Ambulance	ALS	1976 New Haven School Rd.	72
Utility 71	Utility Truck	N/A	9611 U.S. Hwy 42	71
Brush 71	Brush Truck	N/A	9611 U.S. Hwy 42	71
Battalion 71	Battalion Car	N/A	9611 U.S. Hwy 42	71
Tanker 71	Water Tanker	N/A	9611 U.S. Hwy 42	71
Chief 71	Fire Chief	N/A	9611 U.S. Hwy 42	71
Chief 72	Deputy Fire Chief	N/A	9611 U.S. Hwy 42	71
Chief 73	Assistant Fire Chief	N/A	9611 U.S. Hwy 42	71
