= Nannine Clay Wallis Arboretum =

Non-profit arboretum in Paris, Kentucky, United States

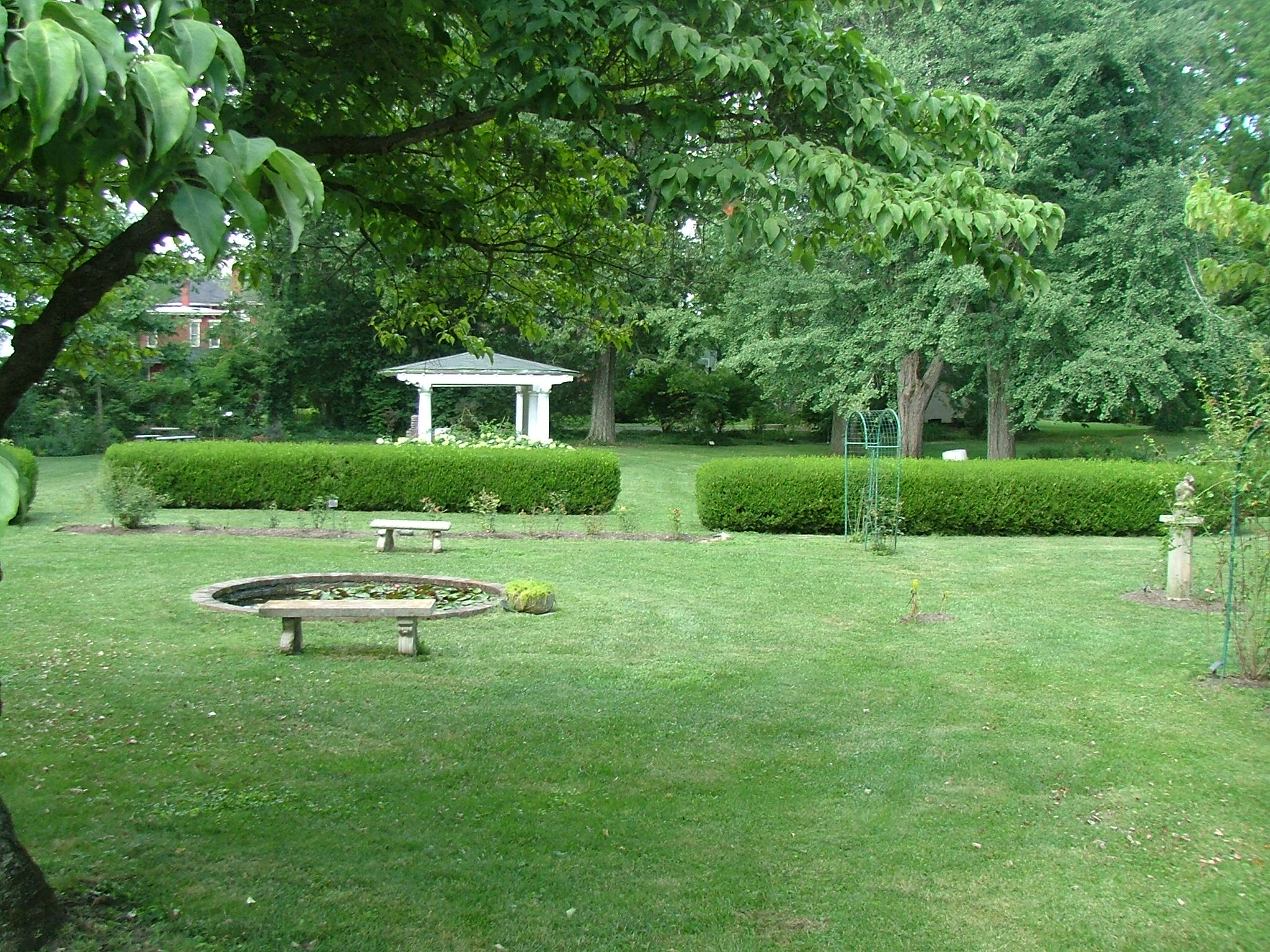
- Interactive map of Nannine Clay Wallis Arboretum
- Type: Arboretum and public park
- Location: Paris, Kentucky, United States
- Coordinates: 38.209168°N 84.249716°W
- Area: 4 acres (0.016 km^{2})
- Created: 1970
- Operator: The Garden Club of Kentucky, Inc.
- Open: All year
- Website: Official website

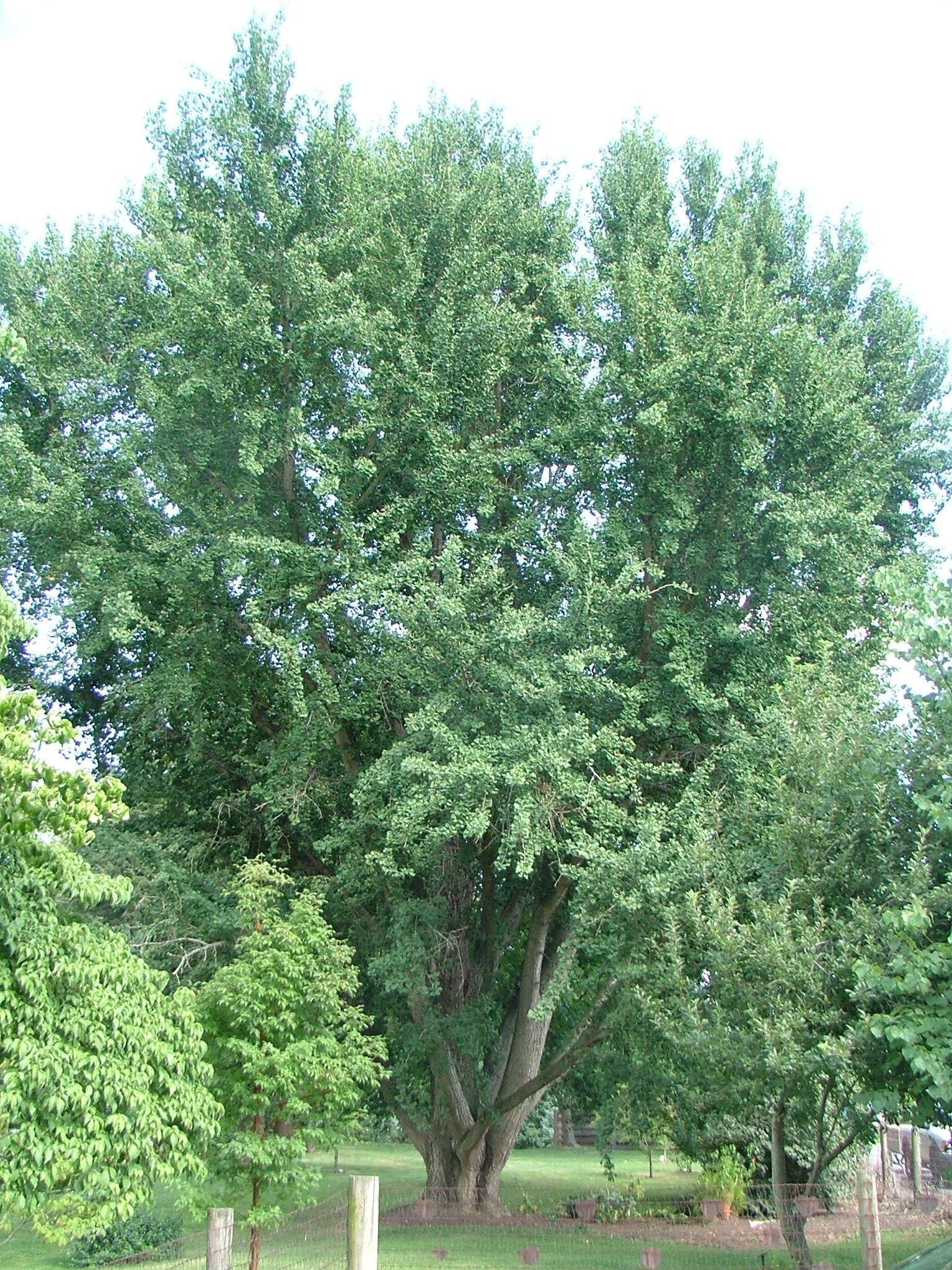
Large Ginkgo on the grounds

The Nannine Clay Wallis Arboretum 4 acres (1.6 hectares) is a non-profit arboretum located at the Garden Club of Kentucky, Inc.'s State Headquarters, 616 Pleasant Street, Paris, Kentucky. The Arboretum is open to the public, sunrise to sunset, free of charge.

The Wallis Arboretum is considered one of the finest old-tree collections in central Kentucky. Its first trees were planted in the mid-1850s, around the 1851 house that is now the headquarters of The Garden Club of Kentucky. Most of the planting was under the direction of Nannine Clay Wallis, in the first half of the 20th century. Mrs. Wallis was a founder and later president of both GCKY, South Atlantic Region, and The National Council of State Garden Clubs.

The Arboretum is a Morton Arboretum certified Level 1 arboretum and contains about 70 varieties of trees including many varieties of flowering dogwoods, as well as a rose garden, an herb garden, a reflecting pool, a daylily garden, and a pavilion. The largest trees at the arboretum include a Small-leaved linden (Tilia Cordata), Ginkgo (Ginkgo Biloba), Northern red oak (Quercus rubra), Tulip Poplar, (Lireodendren Tulipfera), Sugar Maple (Acer Sacrum) and a Cucumber tree (Magnolia acuminata).

== See also ==
- List of botanical gardens in the United States
