= University of Kentucky Research and Education Center Botanical Garden =

Research farm and botanical garden in Princeton, Kentucky, United States

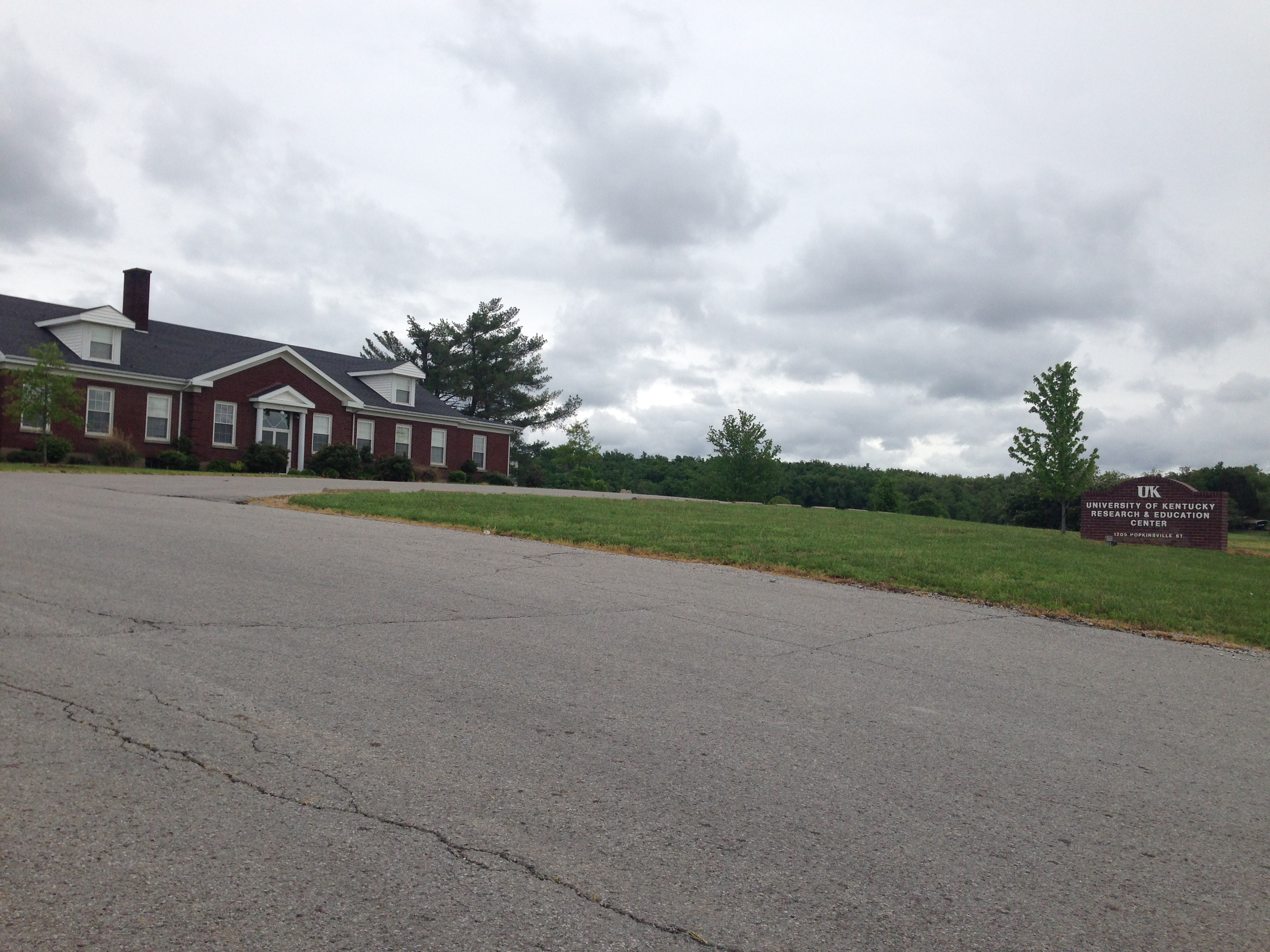
- Location: United States
- Coordinates: 37°06′N 87°52′W
- Location of University of Kentucky Research and Education Center Botanical Garden

The University of Kentucky Research and Education Center Botanical Garden, also known as the UK REC Botanical Garden, is a research farm and botanical garden for the University of Kentucky in Princeton, Kentucky.

The university's Agricultural Experiment Station was established in 1885, with the West Kentucky Substation at Princeton founded in 1925. Today the Experiment Station Farm consists of almost 1,300 acres (520 hectares) where crops such as corn, wheat, soybeans, tobacco, fruits, vegetables and ornamentals are studied. The Princeton site also includes a 10-acre (40,000 m^{2}) orchard/vineyard, plus 2 acres (8,000 m^{2}) of grapes, and 1.5 acres (6,000 m^{2}) for research in small fruit trees and ornamentals.

== See also ==
- List of botanical gardens in the United States
