= Randall K. Cooper High School =

School located in Union, Kentucky

Location
- 2855 Longbranch Road; Union, KY 41091; United States; 38°58′24″N 84°42′42″W

Information
- Type: Public secondary
- Motto: "Aspire. Achieve. Excel."
- Established: 2008
- School district: Boone County Schools
- CEEB code: 182561
- Principal: Michael Wilson
- Staff: 80.00 (FTE)
- Grades: 9-12
- Enrollment: 1,485 (2023–2024)
- Student to teacher ratio: 18.56
- Campus: Suburban
- Colors: Maroon and gold
- Nickname: Jaguars
- Website: https://cooper.boone.kyschools.us/

Randall K. Cooper High School (also known as Cooper High School) is a public high school located in Union, Kentucky, United States, in the Cincinnati metropolitan area. It is the fourth high school in the Boone County School system. The school was named in honor of the late founding principal of Ryle High School, Randy Cooper.

Some middle schools that feed into this school are Ockerman Middle School, Camp Ernst Middle School, and Ballyshannon Middle School.

This school was expanded before the 2014–2015 school year to accommodate growth that is occurring in surrounding neighborhoods that feed into the school.

== Athletics ==
Cooper High School is a member of the KHSAA. The school colors are Maroon and Gold and its mascot is the Jaguar.

== Notable alumni ==
- Adam Kunkel, professional Basketball Shooting guard for the Palencia Baloncesto.
- Lexi Held, professional Basketball guard for the Phoenix Mercury.
- James Alex Fields Jr., perpetrator of the Charlottesville car attack
