= Oakbrook, Kentucky =

Census-designated place in Kentucky, United States

- Census-designated place
- Location within Boone County and the state of Kentucky
- Coordinates: 39°00′25″N 84°40′40″W
- Country: United States
- State: Kentucky
- County: Boone

Area
  - Total: 3.20 sq mi (8.29 km^{2})
  - Land: 3.20 sq mi (8.28 km^{2})
  - Water: 0.0039 sq mi (0.01 km^{2})
- Elevation: 899 ft (274 m)

Population (2020)
  - Total: 9,268
  - Density: 2,897.9/sq mi (1,118.87/km^{2})
- Time zone: UTC-5 (Eastern (EST))
  - Summer (DST): UTC-4 (EDT)
- FIPS code: 21-57030
- GNIS feature ID: 2403365

Oakbrook is a census-designated place (CDP) in Boone County, Kentucky, United States. The population was 9,268 at the 2020 census.

== Geography ==
Oakbrook is located in eastern Boone County and is bordered by the city of Florence to the east and south, and by the unincorporated Burlington (the county seat) to the west. Kentucky Route 18 (Burlington Pike) forms the northern edge of the Oakbrook CDP. Interstate 75/71 is 0.5 miles (0.80 km) east of Oakbrook, and downtown Cincinnati is 12 miles (19 km) to the northeast.

According to the United States Census Bureau, the CDP has a total area of 3.2 square miles (8.2 km^{2}), of which 0.004 square miles (0.01 km^{2}), or 0.14%, is water.

== Demographics ==
Historical population
Census	Pop.	Note	%±
2020	9,268		—
U.S. Decennial Census

=== 2020 census ===
As of the 2020 census, Oakbrook had a population of 9,268. The median age was 41.8 years. 21.3% of residents were under the age of 18 and 18.0% of residents were 65 years of age or older. For every 100 females there were 99.0 males, and for every 100 females age 18 and over there were 95.8 males age 18 and over.

100.0% of residents lived in urban areas, while 0.0% lived in rural areas.

There were 3,706 households in Oakbrook, of which 28.1% had children under the age of 18 living in them. Of all households, 54.6% were married-couple households, 16.0% were households with a male householder and no spouse or partner present, and 22.8% were households with a female householder and no spouse or partner present. About 25.3% of all households were made up of individuals and 9.9% had someone living alone who was 65 years of age or older.

There were 3,812 housing units, of which 2.8% were vacant. The homeowner vacancy rate was 0.5% and the rental vacancy rate was 5.4%.

Racial composition as of the 2020 census
Race	Number	Percent
White	8,044	86.8%
Black or African American	221	2.4%
American Indian and Alaska Native	26	0.3%
Asian	244	2.6%
Native Hawaiian and Other Pacific Islander	8	0.1%
Some other race	167	1.8%
Two or more races	558	6.0%
Hispanic or Latino (of any race)	408	4.4%

=== 2000 census ===
As of the 2000 census, there were 7,726 people, 2,926 households, and 2,206 families residing in the CDP. The population density was 2,368.8 inhabitants per square mile (914.6/km^{2}). There were 3,030 housing units at an average density of 929.0 per square mile (358.7/km^{2}). The racial makeup of the CDP was 94.81% White, 1.84% African American, 0.10% Native American, 2.10% Asian, 0.36% from other races, and 0.79% from two or more races. Hispanic or Latino of any race were 1.06% of the population.

There were 2,926 households, out of which 38.7% had children under the age of 18 living with them, 67.2% were married couples living together, 6.3% had a female householder with no husband present, and 24.6% were non-families. 20.8% of all households were made up of individuals, and 4.3% had someone living alone who was 65 years of age or older. The average household size was 2.64 and the average family size was 3.10.

In the CDP, the population was spread out, with 27.9% under the age of 18, 6.4% from 18 to 24, 36.0% from 25 to 44, 22.8% from 45 to 64, and 7.0% who were 65 years of age or older. The median age was 34 years. For every 100 females, there were 97.4 males. For every 100 females age 18 and over, there were 93.7 males.

The median income for a household in the CDP was $62,023, and the median income for a family was $72,083. Males had a median income of $51,202 versus $32,446 for females. The per capita income for the CDP was $27,575. About 1.2% of families and 1.1% of the population were below the poverty line, including 0.5% of those under age 18 and 2.1% of those age 65 or over.
