= McCrary House =

- U.S. National Register of Historic Places
- Alabama Register of Landmarks and Heritage
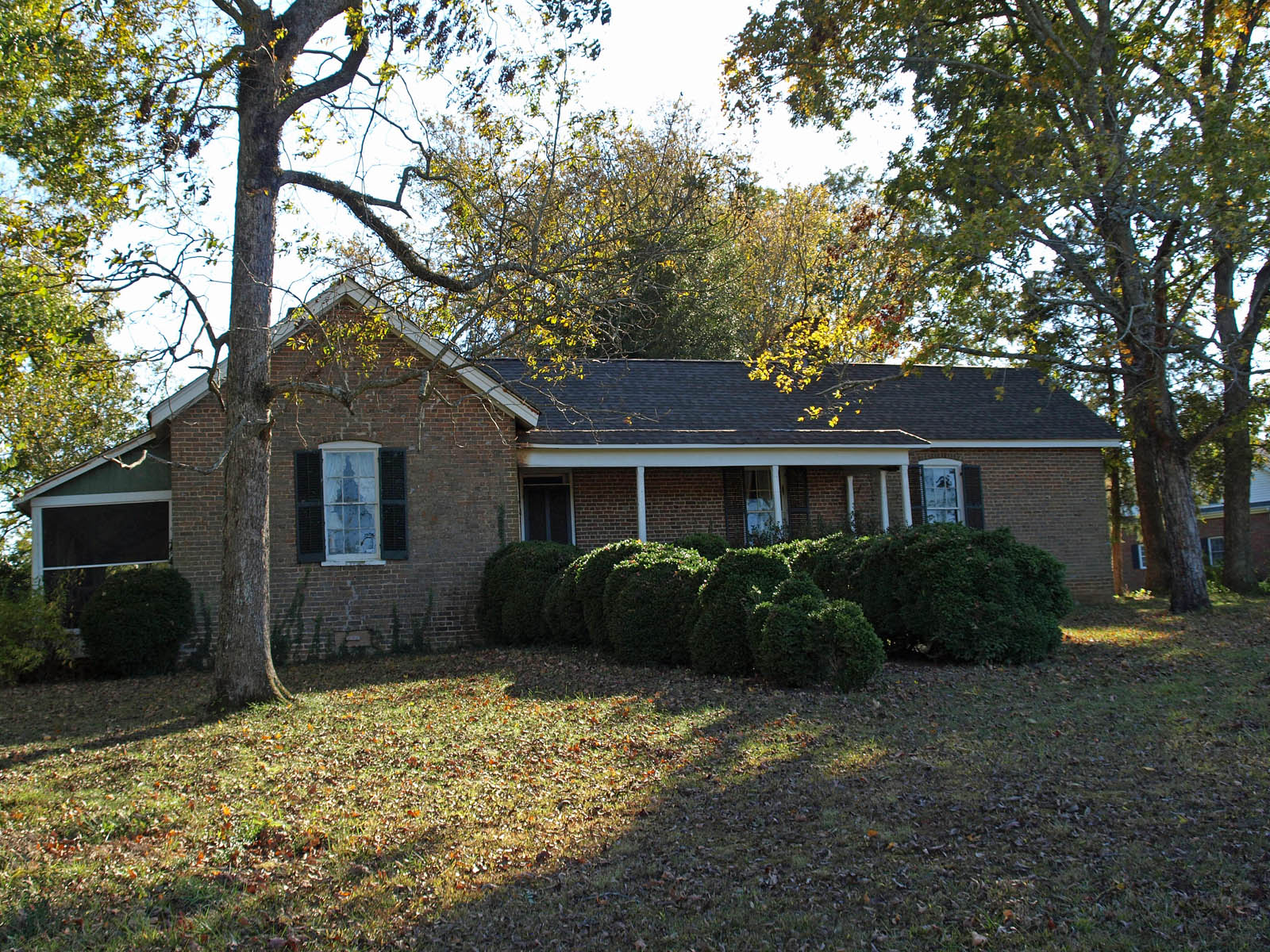
- The house in December 2010

- Location within Alabama Location within the United States
- Nearest city: Huntsville, Alabama
- Coordinates: 34°50′43″N 86°29′14″W
- Area: 4.1 acres (1.7 ha)
- Built: 1840, c.1870
- Architectural style: Federal
- NRHP reference No.: 82002052

Significant dates
- Added to NRHP: June 1, 1982
- Designated ARLH: January 31, 1979

The McCrary House (also known as McVille) is a historic farm house near Huntsville in Madison County, Alabama. Founded after the initial federal land sale in Madison County in 1809, the farm has been in the McCrary family throughout. It was recognized as an Alabama Century & Heritage Farm in 1979, and reaffirmed on its 200th anniversary in 2009. Additionally, the house was listed on the Alabama Register of Landmarks and Heritage in 1979 and the National Register of Historic Places in 1982.

== History ==
Thomas McCrary was born in Laurens County, South Carolina, in 1789, the son of a wealthy farmer. Though he had inherited 150 acres (61 ha) from his father, McCrary sold the land and moved to what is now North Alabama in 1809. He purchased 320 acres (130 ha) near other settlers from Laurens County. His farm grew to over 600 acres (240 ha) by 1833 and to a peak of 2,250 acres (900 ha) in 1850.

McCrary built a log cabin shortly after arriving on the property. He married the daughter of one of his neighbors in 1812, but she died in 1821. He remarried in 1823, and the next year built a two-story house with large halls on each floor. It was constructed of bricks handmade by slaves on the farm. McCrary also lent his brickmaking capacity to the construction of a new building for the nearby Enon Baptist Church; the church would move to Huntsville in 1861 and became the First Baptist Church of Huntsville. Around 1840 a two-story, partially sunken ell was added to the rear of the house, containing a dining room downstairs and sitting room upstairs.

McCrary's business interests extended beyond the farm. He acted as a cotton factor in Huntsville, and was also involved in tanning yards and groceries. McCrary's other investments included the Memphis and Charleston Railroad, which ran through Huntsville, and a turnpike which allowed easier transportation of goods to the Tennessee River. From 1856 to 1860 he was a member of the Madison County Commissioners Court.

After Thomas McCrary's death in 1865, the farm and house passed to his son, Williams. Between 1868 and 1870, at the behest of Williams' wife, who did not like living in a two-story house, the family home was rebuilt, reusing bricks and interior trimwork from the original 1824 house.

== Architecture ==
The current house is built with brick from the original 1824 house. The main portion is T-shaped with a cross-gable roof. A porch covers the main entrance, which opens into a small hall. The hall leads to two bedrooms and a parlor, which leads to another bedroom. A semi-enclosed louvered gallery running the length of the main house separates it from the Federal-style 1840 ell. Half a story above is a sitting room, and below is a dining room. In 1971 a "keeping room", functioning as an apartment and containing a kitchen, den, and bath, was built behind the ell on the site of an earlier kitchen.
