= McVille, Kentucky =

Unincorporated community in Kentucky, United States

Coordinates: 38°58′39″N 84°49′27″W

McVille is an unincorporated community in Boone County, in the U.S. state of Kentucky.

== History ==
Variant names were "Mackville", "Maxville", and "Rices Landing". It is unknown why the name "McVille" was applied to this community.
