= Boone County Arboretum =

Arboretum in Union, Kentucky, United States

Coordinates: 38.9649°N 84.7227°W

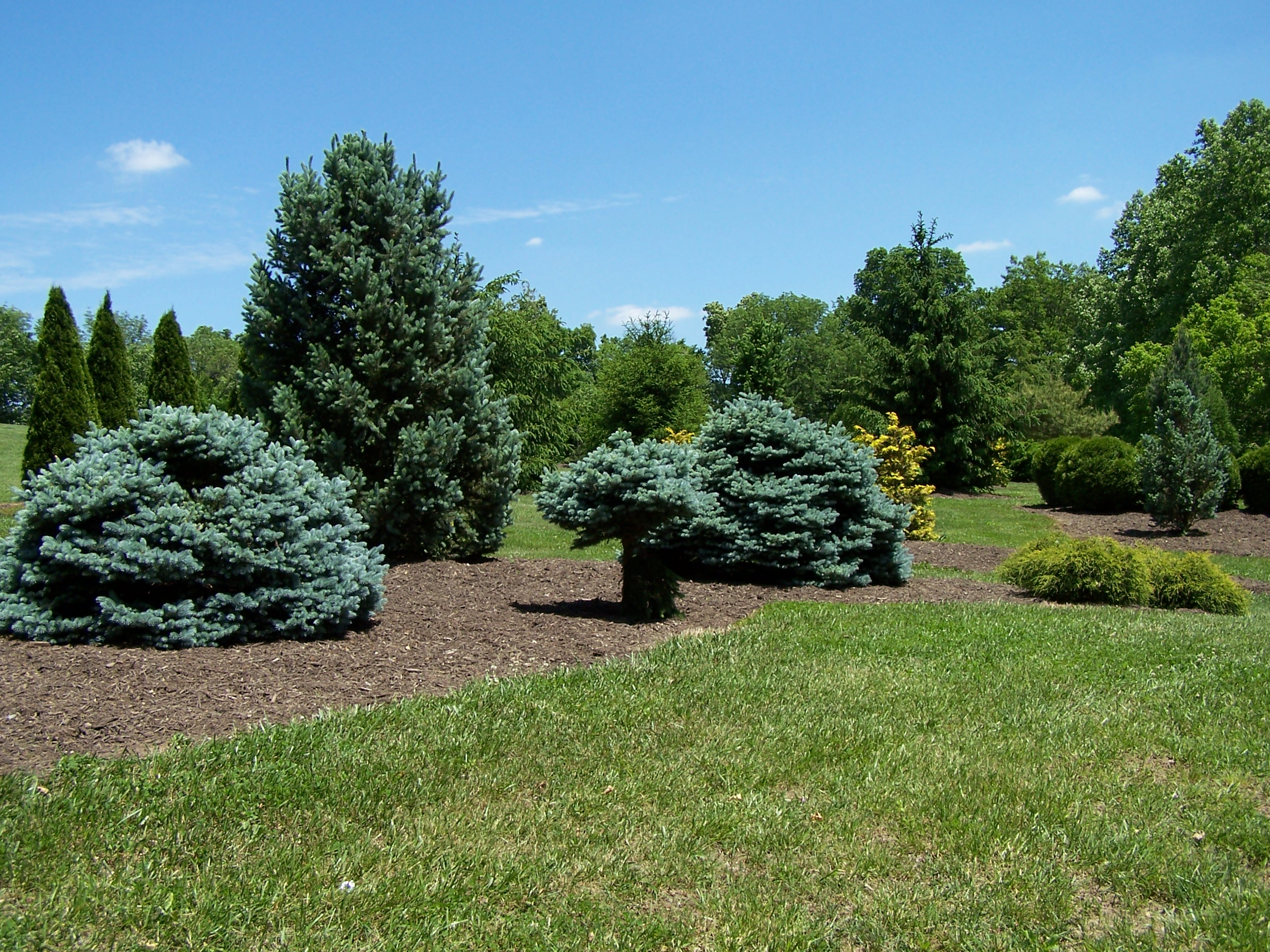
- Conifers at the arboretum
- Interactive map of Boone County Arboretum
- Website: Official website

The Boone County Arboretum is a 121-acre (490,000 m^{2}) arboretum located at 9190 Camp Ernst Road, Union, Kentucky, United States. It is open to the public without charge during daylight hours.

The Arboretum first started as an idea in 1996, was formally dedicated in 1999, and now contains more than 3,300 plants, including over 1,400 trees and 1,900 shrubs, that represent over 873 taxa. All are labeled and recorded with a GPS location. The Arboretum also features approximately 2.5 miles (4 km) of walking trails.

Boone County Arboretum is the nation's first arboretum within an active recreation park setting. The Arboretum is located just outside Union, KY.

The collections are tailored for varied levels of expertise, including exhibits for experienced and casual visitors. These include specialized arrangements of plant families and uncommon specimen generally not available to the public. To insure the facilities' plants thrive in severe droughts, a 41,000-foot (12,000 m) computerized irrigation system is designed around the plantings.

The Arboretum's paved walking trails wind through the various plant collections, woodland settings, and athletic fields. Three informational kiosks are located at the main trail entrances, and contain horticultural information, Extension class offerings, visitors guides and the Arboretum collections map, all free to the public. Special attractions at the Arboretum include the Children's Garden, a Wildlife Viewing area in the Native Kentucky Prairie, and a new Woodland Walking Trail.

Throughout the year various classes and programs are offered for all age groups. In addition, many of the Extension horticulture classes are taught on site at the Arboretum.

In 2012, Boone County Arboretum became the first arboretum within the Greater Cincinnati Metro area and in the state of Kentucky, to be a Level IV Accredited Arboretum by the Morton Register.

== See also ==
- List of botanical gardens in the United States
