= Western Kentucky Botanical Garden =

Botanical garden in Owensboro, Kentucky

Coordinates: 37.7572°N 87.1175°W

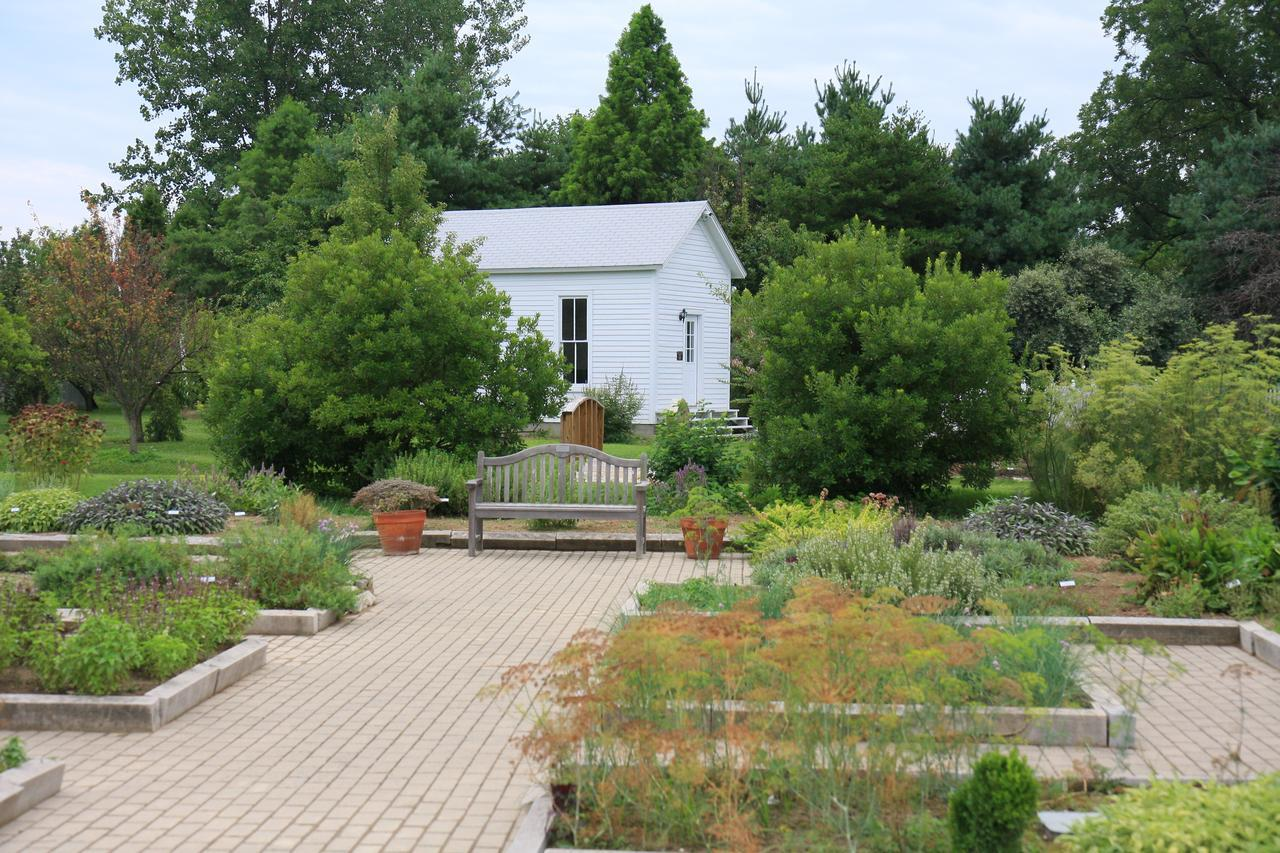
Country Doctor's Office adjacent to the Herb Garden

The Western Kentucky Botanical Garden (WKBG) is a botanical garden in Owensboro, Kentucky. The garden contains several themed gardens, including a large collection of daylilies with an American Hemerocallis Society-recognized display garden. Other gardens include a large herb garden, a rose garden, an English cottage garden, a Kentucky symbol quilt garden, a Japanese memorial garden, an ericaceous garden, the Moonlite Children's garden, the University of Kentucky Extension display garden, and a Western Kentucky University experimental garden. The garden also includes several ponds and many works of public art, including insect and wind sculptures.

Buildings in the garden include a house donated and moved to the garden and used for administration offices and gatherings, a large gazebo, an educational classroom building with attached conservatory, an English Cottage, a Country Doctors office built in 1890, a Children's Playhouse, and an antique ticket booth built in 1890.

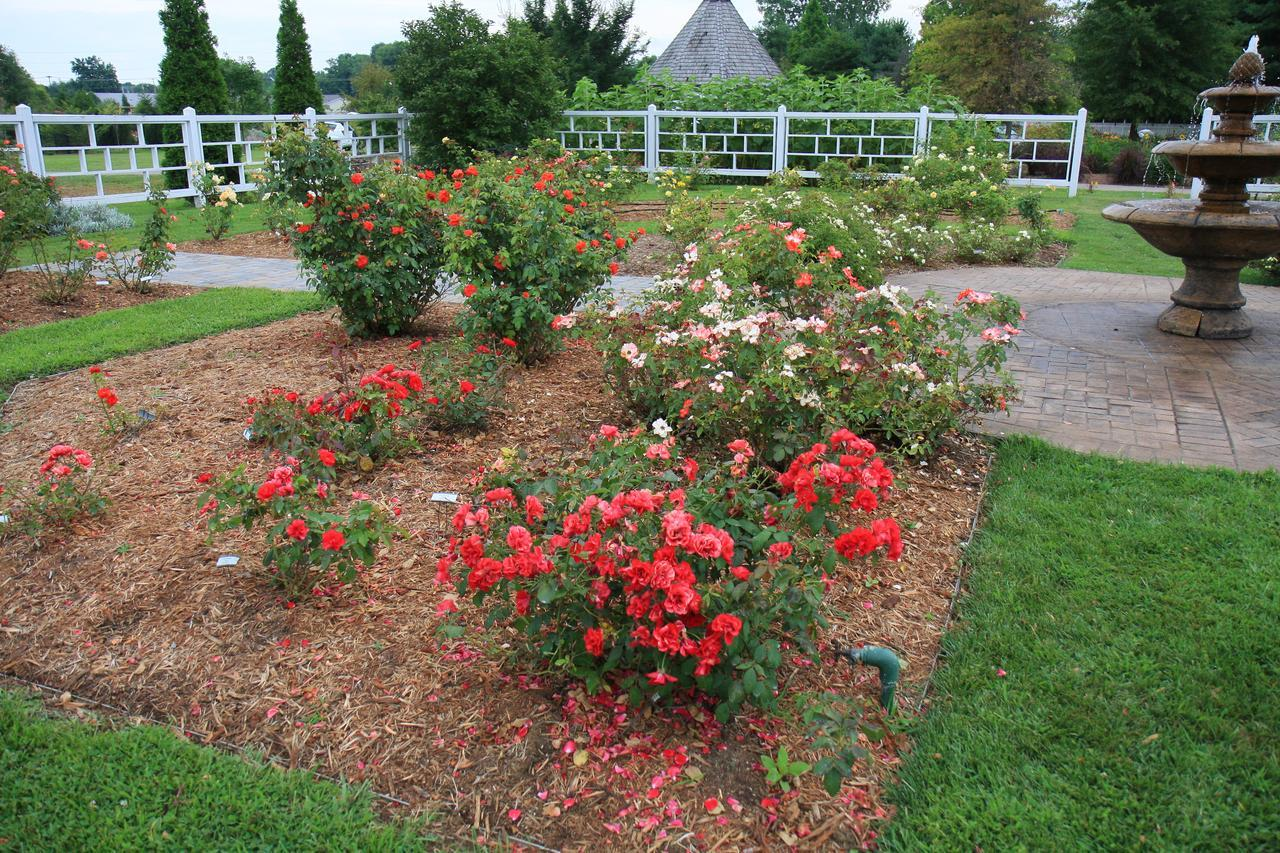
The English Rose Garden

WKBG is part of the American Horticultural Society's Reciprocal Admissions Program.

== History ==
In 1993 a Master Gardener's class in Daviess County, Kentucky, created the garden with Dr. and Mrs. William Tyler donating approximately 8.5 acres to the City of Owensboro for the start of the garden and the 501(c)(3) organization. A few years later another acre was purchased to create a separate entrance to the garden.

== See also ==
- List of botanical gardens in the United States
