= Union, Kentucky =

- City
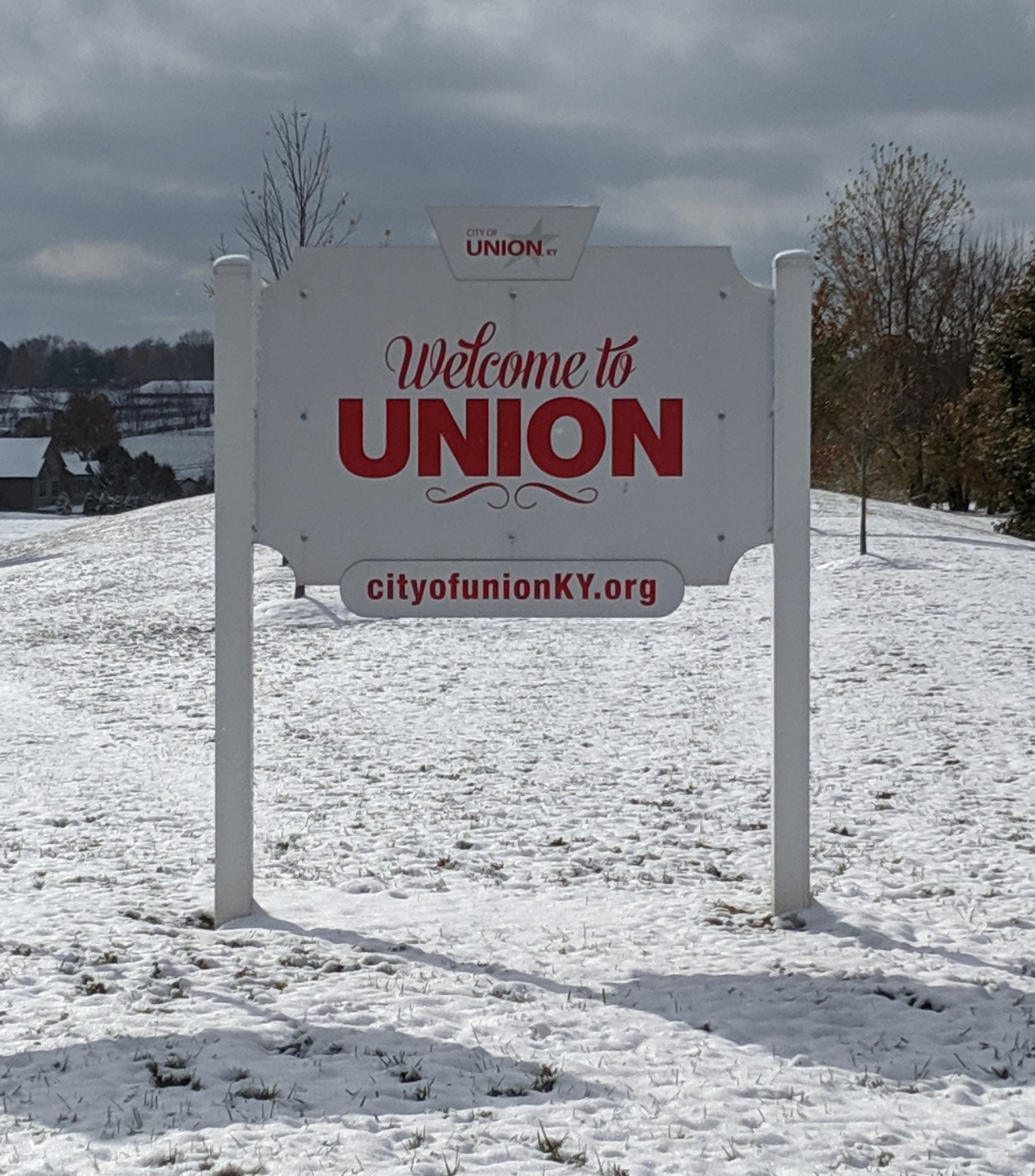

- Flag
- Motto: Proud Past, Promising Future!
- Location of Union in Boone County, Kentucky.

- Location in Kentucky
- Coordinates: 38°56′49″N 84°40′23″W
- Country: United States
- State: Kentucky
- County: Boone
- Established: 1838/1969

Government
  - Type: Commission
  - Mayor: Larry King Solomon
  - Commissioners: John Mefford, Jeremy Ramage, Doug Bine, Brian Garner City Administrator - Amy Safran

Area
  - Total: 3.47 sq mi (8.99 km^{2})
  - Land: 3.47 sq mi (8.99 km^{2})
  - Water: 0 sq mi (0.00 km^{2})
- Elevation: 902 ft (275 m)

Population (2020)
  - Total: 7,416
  - Estimate (2022): 7,592
  - Density: 2,135/sq mi (824.5/km^{2})
- Time zone: UTC-5 (Eastern (EST))
  - Summer (DST): UTC-4 (EDT)
- ZIP code: 41091
- Area code: 859
- FIPS code: 21-78384
- GNIS feature ID: 2405624
- Website: www.cityofunionky.org

Union is a home-rule-class city in Boone County, Kentucky, United States. The population was 7,416 as of the 2020 United States census. The area was rural until residential growth in the 1990s and 2000s. Union is located 17 miles (27 km) southwest of Cincinnati, Ohio.

== Geography ==
According to the United States Census Bureau, the city has a total area of 3.2 square miles (8.3 km^{2}), all of it land.

The city of Union has a defined city boundary, which does not include all of the addresses defined as Union by the United States Postal Service. Some nearby communities, including Triple Crown Country Club, Cool Springs and Brigadoon, have Union addresses but are not part of the incorporated city and are in unincorporated Boone County.

== Demographics ==
Historical population
Census	Pop.	Note	%±
1920	100		—
1930	94		−6.0%
1970	233		—
1980	601		157.9%
1990	1,001		66.6%
2000	2,893		189.0%
2010	5,379		85.9%
2020	7,416		37.9%
2024 (est.)	7,894		6.4%
U.S. Decennial Census

=== 2020 census ===
As of the 2020 census, Union had a population of 7,416. The median age was 37.5 years. 29.8% of residents were under the age of 18 and 11.6% were 65 years of age or older. For every 100 females, there were 100.3 males, and for every 100 females age 18 and over, there were 97.7 males age 18 and over.

95.6% of residents lived in urban areas, while 4.4% lived in rural areas.

There were 2,456 households, of which 44.6% had children under the age of 18 living in them. Of all households, 72.3% were married-couple households, 10.1% were households with a male householder and no spouse or partner present, and 13.7% were households with a female householder and no spouse or partner present. About 13.7% of all households were made up of individuals, and 5.8% had someone living alone who was 65 years of age or older.

There were 2,665 housing units, of which 7.8% were vacant. The homeowner vacancy rate was 1.2% and the rental vacancy rate was 20.6%.

Racial composition as of the 2020 census
Race	Number	Percent
White	6,326	85.3%
Black or African American	173	2.3%
American Indian and Alaska Native	19	0.3%
Asian	426	5.7%
Native Hawaiian and Other Pacific Islander	4	0.1%
Some other race	72	1.0%
Two or more races	396	5.3%
Hispanic or Latino (of any race)	272	3.7%

=== 2010 census ===
As of the census of 2010, there were 5,379 people, 1,661 households, and 1,471 families residing in the city. The population density was 894.4 inhabitants per square mile (345.3/km^{2}). There were 1,739 housing units at an average density of 271.7 units per square mile (104.9 units/km^{2}). The racial makeup of the city was 91.3% White, 1.2% African American, 0.0% Native American, 5.7% Asian, 0.0% Pacific Islander, 0.0% from other races, and 1.7% from two or more races. Hispanic or Latino of any race were 1.8% of the population.

=== 2000 census ===
There were 850 households, out of which 62.9% included children under the age of 18. 85.3% were married couples living together, 5.1% had a female householder with no husband present, and 7.8% were non-families. 5.9% of all households were made up of individuals, and 1.8% had someone living alone who was 65 years of age or older. The average household size was 3.40 and the average family size was 3.55.

In the city, the population age ranges included 37.6% under the age of 18, 4.8% from 18 to 24, 35.9% from 25 to 44, 19.4% from 45 to 64, and 2.3% who were 65 years of age or older. The median age was 32 years. For every 100 females, there were 100.3 males. For every 100 females age 18 and over, there were 100.9 males.

The median income for a household in the city was $85,454, and the median income for a family was $85,859 (2009 estimates indicate a rise to $97,083 and $98,672, respectively). Males had a median income of $61,531 versus $34,861 for females. The per capita income for the city was $27,626. About 1.4% of families and 1.4% of the population were below the poverty line, including 1.1% of those under age 18 and 3.0% of those age 65 or over.

== Government ==
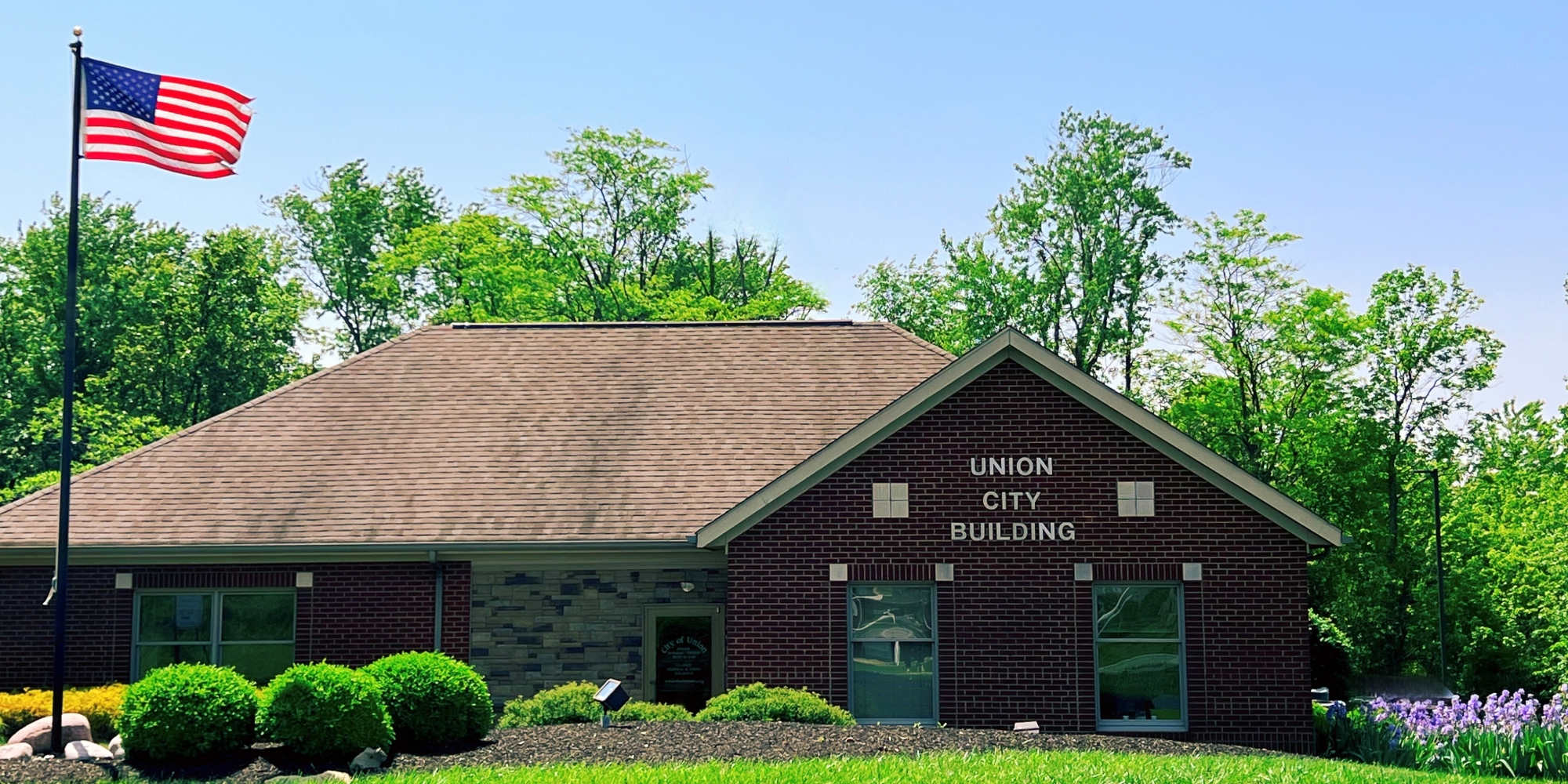
Union, Kentucky City Building on Bristow Dr.

Administration of city functions is separated into departments by ordinance, and each of these departments is placed under the supervision of one of the city commissioners unless the city has created the position of city administrative officer.

Emergency medical treatment and transportation, fire suppression, rescue, and many other emergency and non-emergency services in the city are provided by the Union Fire Protection District, operating under Fire Chief Aaron Gruelle.

Law enforcement in the city is performed by the Boone County Sheriff's Office, which employs nearly 200 sworn deputies and 80 deputies assigned to Patrol and Traffic Divisions and is led by Sheriff Michael A Helmig.

On July 8, 2022, Union Mayor Larry Solomon was joined by Boone County Judge-Executive Gary Moore and officials from Cincinnati Children's Hospital to break ground on Union Promenade, a $150 million Live/Work/Place concept co-developed by T.J. Ackermann of Thomas J. Ackermann Company, Inc., and Ralph Meierjohan of Meierjohan Building Group.

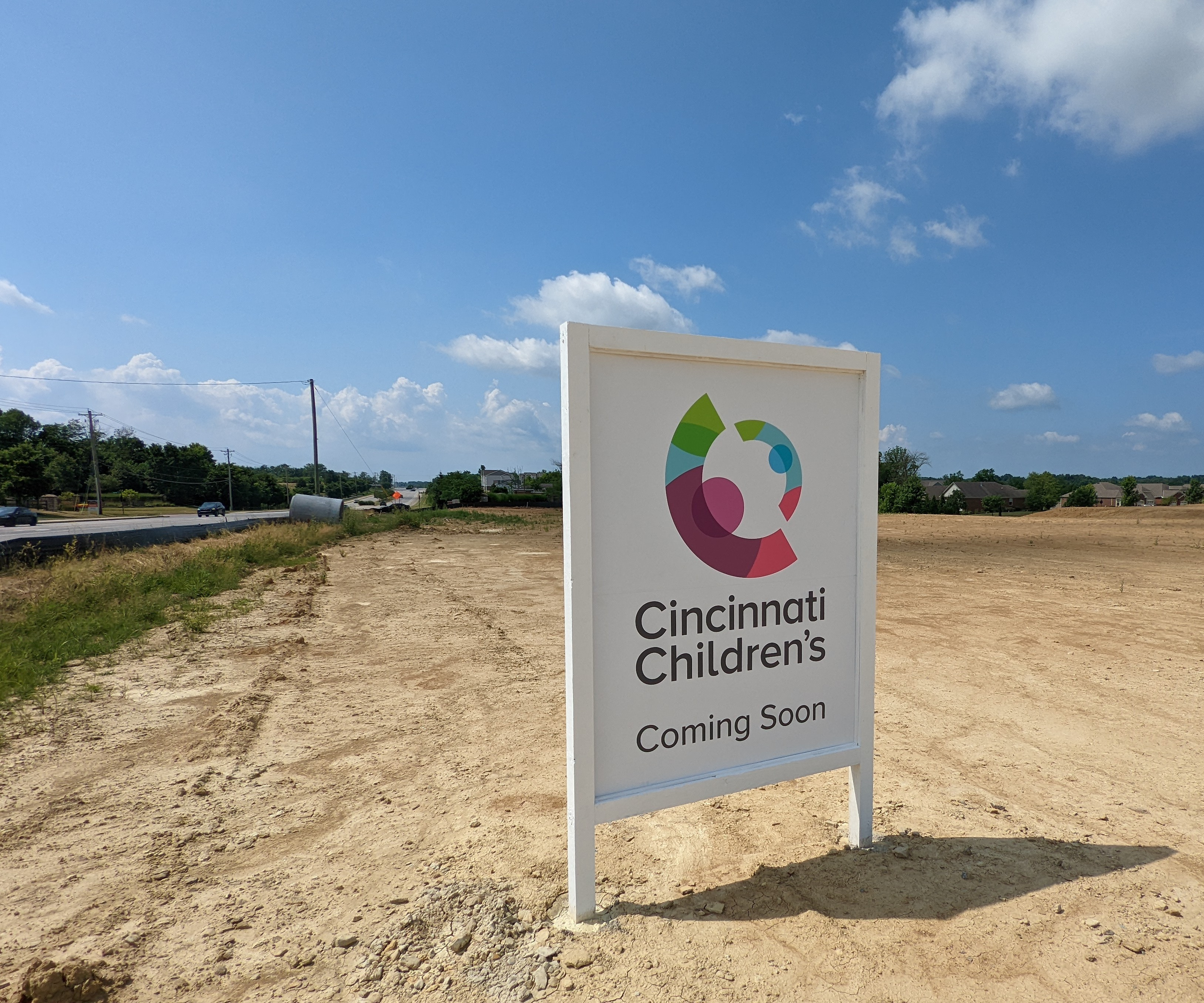
Union Promenade groundbreaking Cincinnati Children's Hospital Medical Center

== Neighborhoods ==
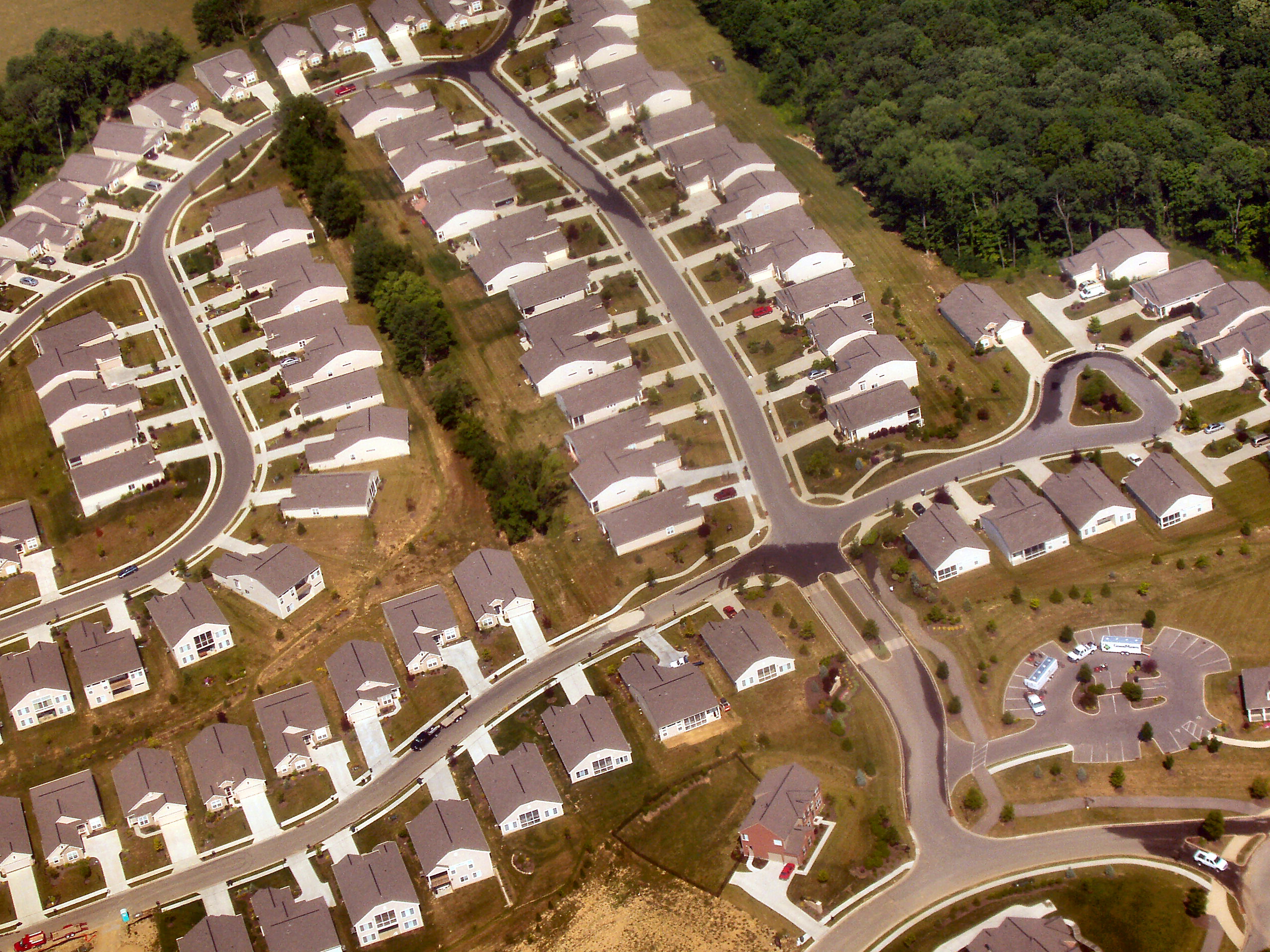
Tract housing near Union

- Ballyshannon
- Cedarwood
- Hampshire Estates
- Harmony
- Hawks Landing
- Hempsteade
- Indian Hill
- Ivy Pond
- Lassing Green
- Orleans
- Orleans North
- Russwill
- Sycamore
- Whispering Trail
- Union Bluff
- Union Station
- Triple Crown
- Traemore
- Arbor Springs
- Westbrook
- Cool Springs

== Education ==
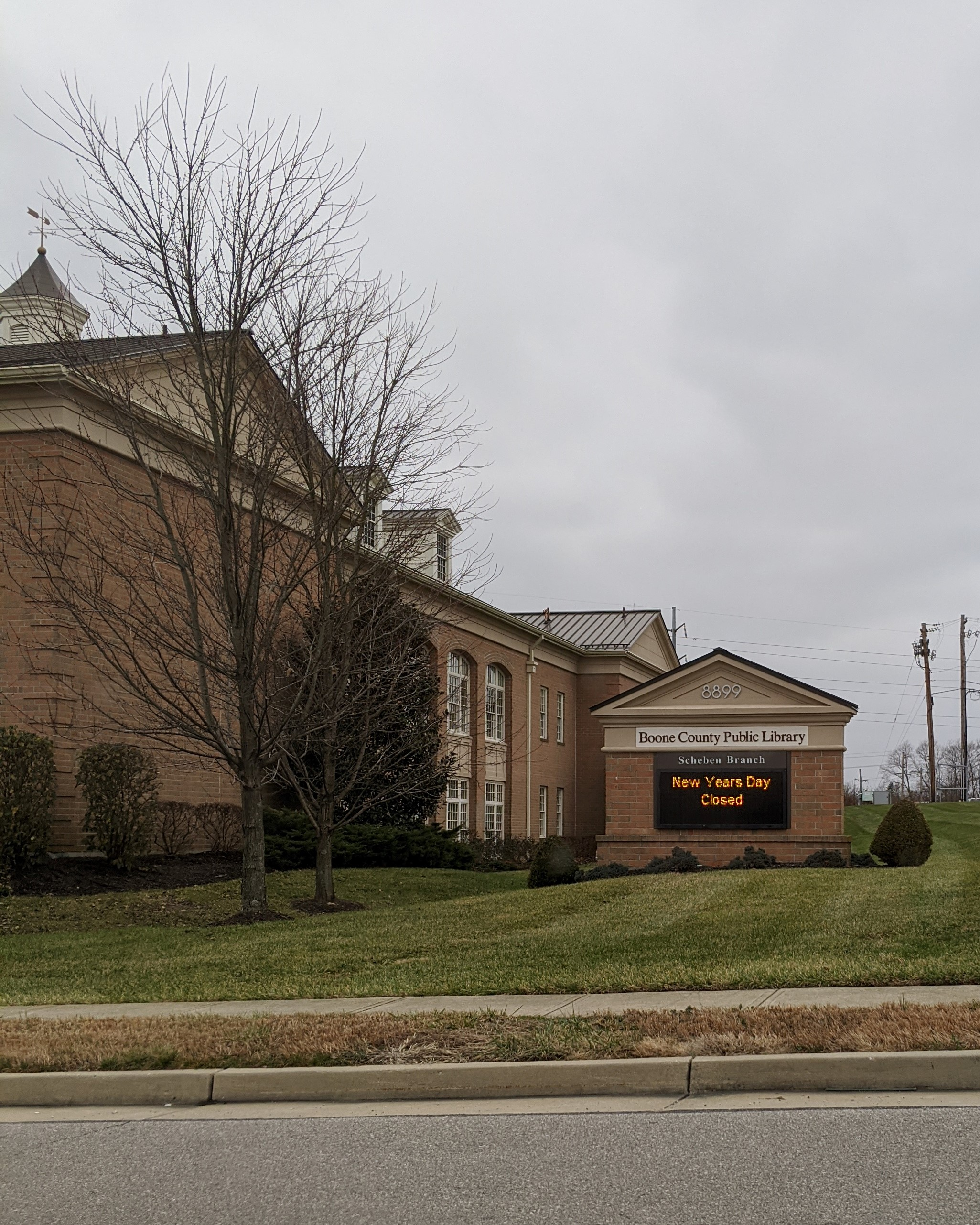
Boone County Public Library - Scheben Branch

=== Schools and libraries ===
The City of Union is home to seven public schools, all part of Boone County Schools.

Elementary Schools

- Longbranch Elementary School
- New Haven Elementary School
- Shirley Mann Elementary School

Middle Schools

- Ballyshannon Middle School
- Gray Middle School

High Schools

- Cooper High School
- Larry A. Ryle High School

Union has a public library, Scheben Branch, which is an installation of the Boone County Public Library system.

== Transportation ==
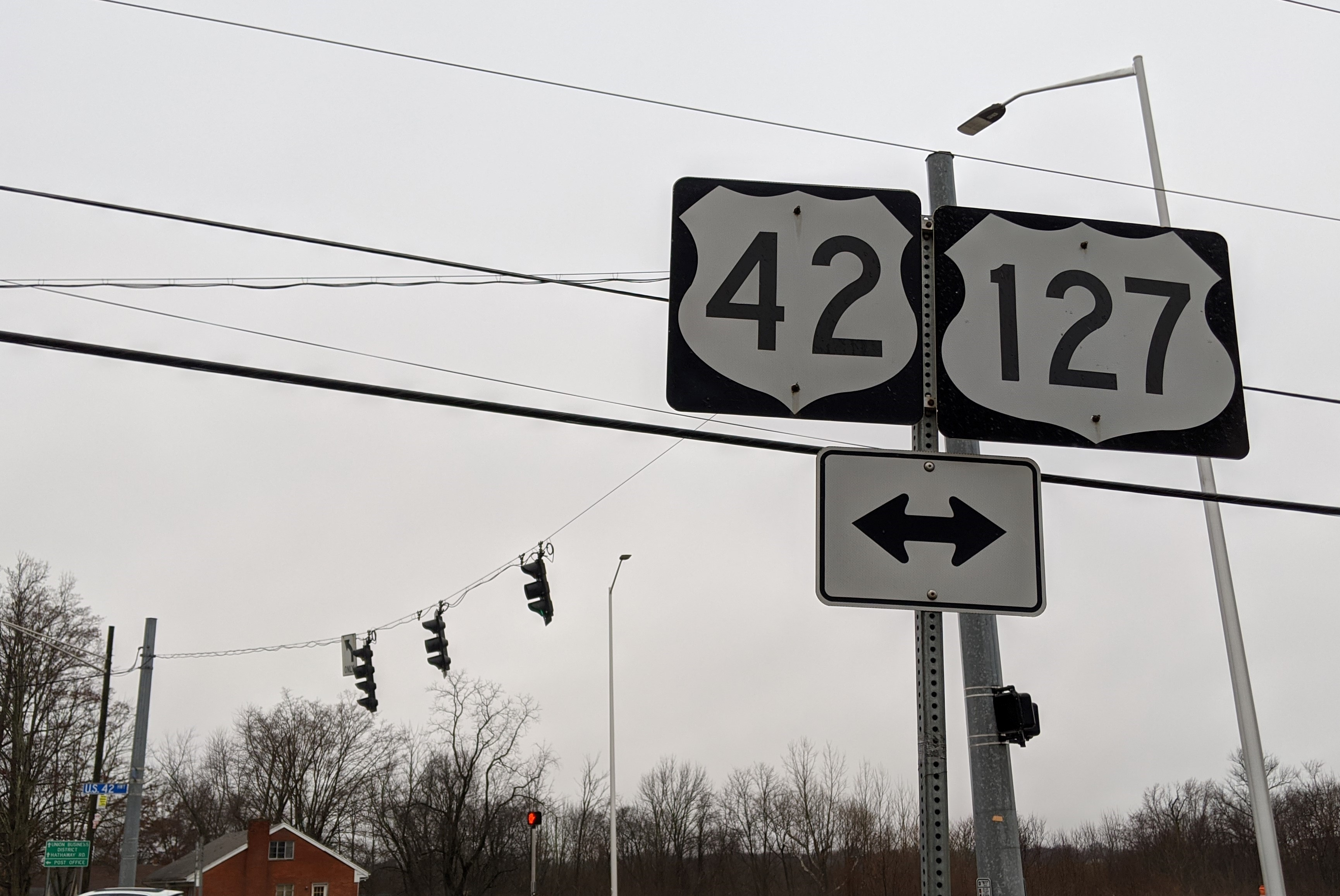
US 42/US 127 at the KY 536 Junction

=== Roadways and freeways ===
The city of Union is served by two US Highways (US 42 and US 127) and three Kentucky Routes (237, 536, and 2953). Concurrent Interstates 71/75 connect the city directly to Cincinnati (northbound) and Lexington/Louisville (southbound).

=== Airports ===
Air travel is provided by the Cincinnati/Northern Kentucky International Airport. It is less than 20 miles away via Interstates 71/75 and Interstate 275.

== Notable people ==
- Steve Flesch (golfer)
- Josh Hutcherson (actor)
- Paul Marcotte (businessman and politician)
- Tanner Morgan (football player)
