= Rogers House =

Rogers House may refer to:

in the United States

- William A. Rogers House, Eutaw, Alabama
- Horace Franklin Rogers House, Fort Smith, Arkansas
- Rogers House (Little Rock, Arkansas)
- Bob Rogers House, Searcy, Arkansas
- Will Rogers House (Los Angeles, California)
- John Rogers House (Branford, Connecticut)
- John Rogers Studio, New Canaan, Connecticut
- Rogers House (Daytona Beach, Florida)
- Rock Rogers House, Macon, Georgia, listed on the NRHP in Bibb County
- Franklin Rogers Bungalow, Paris, Idaho, listed on the NRHP in Bear Lake County
- Frederick Rogers House, Paris, Idaho, listed on the NRHP in Bear Lake County
- Orson Rogers House, Marengo, Illinois
- Rogers-Knutson House, Clear Lake, Iowa
- Mead-Rogers House, Abilene, Kansas, listed on the NRHP in Dickinson County
- Lon Rogers House, Ashland, Kentucky, listed on the NRHP in Boyd County
- James Rogers House (Belleview, Kentucky)
- Joseph Hale Rogers House, Lexington, Kentucky, listed on the NRHP in Fayette County
- Cleveland-Rogers House, Lexington, Kentucky
- Boone Fowler Rogers Barn, Petersburg, Kentucky, listed on the NRHP in Boone
- Rogers-Downing House, Andover, Massachusetts
- Rogers House (Holden, Massachusetts)
- John W. Keeney and Erena Alexander Rogers Farm, Franklin Township, Michigan
- Francis M. Rogers House, Aberdeen, Mississippi, listed on the NRHP in Monroe County
- Newell Rogers House, Laurel, Mississippi
- Rogers House (Silver Creek, Mississippi), listed on the NRHP in Lawrence County
- Rogers House (Kalispell, Montana), listed on the NRHP in Flathead County
- George Rogers House (Portsmouth, New Hampshire)
- John Rogers House (Princeton, New Jersey)
- Nathaniel Rogers House, Bridgehampton, New York
- Rogers Brothers Farmstead, Cape Vincent, New York
- John Rogers House (Huntington, New York)
- Rogers House (Huntington, New York)
- Archibald Rogers Estate, Hyde Park, New York
- John S. Rogers House, New York, New York
- Rogers-Bagley-Daniels-Pegues House, Raleigh, North Carolina
- Rogers-Whitaker-Haywood House, Wake Crossroads, North Carolina
- Bobbitt-Rogers House and Tobacco Manufactory District, Wilton, North Carolina
- James Mitchell Rogers House, Winston-Salem, North Carolina
- Rogers House (Granville, Ohio), listed on the NRHP in Licking County
- Fitz Randolph-Rogers House, Hamilton, Ohio
- Will Rogers Hotel, Claremore, Oklahoma, listed in the NRHP in Rogers County
- Will Rogers Birthplace, Oologah, Oklahoma
- George Rogers House (Lake Oswego, Oregon)
- Colver-Rogers Farmstead, Jefferson, Pennsylvania
- Philip Rogers House, Warwick Township, Pennsylvania
- Joseph Rogers House (Newport, Rhode Island)
- William Rogers House (Bishopville, South Carolina)
- Paul H. Rogers House, Hartsville, South Carolina
- Edward H. Rogers Homestead, Austin, Texas, listed on the NRHP in Travis County
- J. A. Walker House and R. B. Rogers House, Brownwood, Texas, listed on the NRHP in Brown County
- William S. Rogers House, Chappell Hill, Texas, listed in the NRHP in Washington County
- Rogers-Bell House, East Austin, Texas, listed on the NRHP in Travis County
- Rogers-O'Daniel House, Fort Worth, Texas, listed on the NRHP in Tarrant County
- Ghent W. Rogers House, Houston, Texas, listed on the NRHP in Harris County
- Rogers-Drummond House, Mount Vernon, Texas, listed on the NRHP in Franklin County
- John H. and Margaretta Rogers House, Park City, Utah, listed on the NRHP in Summit County
- Rogers House (Morgantown, West Virginia)

== See also ==
- George Rogers House (disambiguation)
- James Rogers House (disambiguation)
- Joseph Rogers House (disambiguation)
- John Rogers House (disambiguation)
- Rogers House
- Will Rogers House (disambiguation)
- William Rogers House (disambiguation)
- Rodgers House (disambiguation)
