= John Rogers House =

John Rogers House may refer to:

in the United States

- John Rogers House (Branford, Connecticut), listed on the National Register of Historic Places (NRHP)
- John Rogers Studio, New Canaan, Connecticut, NRHP-listed
- John Rogers House (West Windsor, New Jersey), NRHP-listed
- John Rogers House (Huntington, New York), NRHP-listed
- John S. Rogers House, New York City, NRHP-listed
- John H. and Margaretta Rogers House, Park City, Utah, listed on the NRHP in Summit County, Utah

== See also ==
- Rogers House (disambiguation)
