= Joseph Rogers =

Joseph Rogers may refer to:

- Joseph Rogers (pioneer) (1764–1833), founded the town of Rogersville, Tennessee in 1789
- Joseph O. Rogers Jr. (1921–1999), member of the South Carolina House of Representatives
- Joseph Rogers (American football) (1924–2011), head coach of the Villanova Wildcats in 1959
- Joseph Rogers (Canadian football) (born 1971), CFL wide receiver
- Joseph Rogers (English cricketer) (1908–1968), English cricketer for Gloucestershire
- Joseph Rogers (physician) (1821–1889), English campaigning medical officer
- Joseph Rogers (West Indian cricketer) (died 1946)
- Joseph Rogers (footballer) (1868–?), Welsh international footballer
- Joseph Rogers (neuroscientist), American neuroscientist
- Joseph Rogers (comics), the father of Captain America

== See also ==
- Joseph Rodgers (disambiguation)
- Joe Rogers (disambiguation)
- Joseph Rogers House (disambiguation)
