= Charles Rogers (cricketer) =

English cricketer (1823-1887)

Personal information
- Full name: Charles Rogers
- Born: 23 March 1823; Cowley, Oxfordshire, England
- Died: 23 February 1887 (aged 63); Cowley, Oxfordshire, England
- Batting: Unknown
- Bowling: Unknown
- Relatives: Basil Rogers (grandson); Neville Rogers (grandson); Herbert Rogers (grandson); Joseph Rogers (great-grandson)

Domestic team information
- Years: Team
- 1861: Marylebone Cricket Club

Career statistics
Competition	First-class
Matches	2
Runs scored	14
Batting average	3.50
100s/50s	–/–
Top score	5
Balls bowled	120
Wickets	1
Bowling average	81.00
5 wickets in innings	–
10 wickets in match	–
Best bowling	1/40
Catches/stumpings	–/–
- Source: Cricinfo, 27 December 2019

Charles Rogers (23 March 1823 – 23 February 1887) was an English first-class cricketer.

Rogers was born in 1823 at Cowley, Oxfordshire. He was the first member of his family to take up groundskeeping and cricket coaching, moving away from the family tradition of agricultural labouring. He made two appearances in first-class cricket, the first of which came for Manchester against Sussex at Eccles in 1858, followed by an appearance for the Marylebone Cricket Club against Middlesex at Lord's in 1861.

Below first-class level he played at county level for Herefordshire and played two matches, in 1853 and 1857, for Shropshire while engaged as club professional for Eyton.

He worked as a groundsman at Balliol College, Oxford. Rogers died at Cowley in February 1887. His grandsons Basil, Neville and Hebert, all played first-class cricket, as did his great-grandson Joseph.
