= James Rogers House =

James Rogers House may refer to:

- James Mitchell Rogers House, Winston-Salem, North Carolina, listed on the National Register of Historic Places (NRHP) in Forsyth County
- James Rogers House (Belleview, Kentucky), NRHP-listed in Boone County

== See also ==
- Rogers House (disambiguation)
