= Neville Rogers =

English cricketer

Personal information
- Full name: Neville Hamilton Rogers
- Born: 9 March 1918; Cowley, Oxfordshire, England
- Died: 7 October 2003 (aged 85); Southampton, Hampshire, England
- Batting: Right-handed
- Bowling: Unknown
- Relatives: Charles Rogers (grandfather); Basil Rogers (cousin); Herbert Rogers (cousin)

Domestic team information
- Years: Team
- 1946–1955: Hampshire
- 1949–1954: Marylebone Cricket Club

Career statistics
Competition	First-class
Matches	298
Runs scored	16,056
Batting average	32.04
100s/50s	28/75
Top score	186
Balls bowled	28
Wickets	0
Bowling average	–
5 wickets in innings	–
10 wickets in match	–
Best bowling	–
Catches/stumpings	196/–
- Source: , 16 April 2023

Neville Hamilton Rogers (9 March 1918 – 7 October 2003) was an English first-class cricketer who played for Hampshire. An opening batsman, he made nearly 300 appearances in first-class cricket, scoring over 16,000 runs and making 28 centuries. He is considered one of the most accomplished batsman to have played for Hampshire, passing over 1,000 runs per season each year from 1947 until his retirement in 1955. Rogers is considered unfortunate to have not played Test cricket for England, with his selection as 12th man in 1951 the closest he ever came to international honours. Following his playing career, he became a commentator for BBC Radio Solent.

== Cricket career ==
Rogers hailed from a well-known Oxfordshire cricketing family, with his father and uncle taking more than 1,000 wickets between them for Oxfordshire in minor counties cricket. His grandfather and two cousins (Basil and Herbert Rogers) were also first-class cricketers. He was born in Cowley and was educated at the City of Oxford High School for Boys. After playing for Oxford City Cricket Club, he trialled with Hampshire in 1939. However, the outbreak of the Second World War interrupted the nascent stages of his cricket career, with Rogers serving in the war in the Royal Artillery. He returned to Hampshire initially as a middle order batsman following the war, making his debut in first-class cricket against Worcestershire at Southampton in the 1946 County Championship; his debut season saw him make 27 first-class appearances, though he made only 696 runs at an average of 16.97. His output improved from his 28 matches the following season, during which he played as an opening batsman alongside Johnny Arnold, with Rogers passing 1,000 runs for the first time. In the lead-up to making his first century, he made four scores in the nineties, before making an unbeaten 103 against Cambridge University. He soon followed this up with a maiden County Championship century against Nottinghamshire, having been dropped at gully while on 19.

He was less prolific in 1948, but nonetheless made over 1,300 runs at an average of 25.70. He struggled early in the season, before a return-to-form against Sussex in July. In one notable innings during that season, Rogers made a fast-scoring century against Essex and shared in a stand of 99 runs with his captain, Desmond Eagar; their partnership was made in under an hour. In 1949, his batting average rose to 30.64 for the season in amassing 1,747 runs. From the 1949 season, Rogers increasingly opened the batting alongside Neil McCorkell, with Arnold dropping down the order and subsequently retiring during the 1950 season following illness. Against the touring West Indians at the beginning of July 1950, Rogers made a century before lunch on the third day of the match, in doing so he also passed 1,000 runs for the season. The 1950 season was, to that point, his most successful, with 1,857 runs at an average of 36.41. Success the following season, in which he scored 1,971 runs at an average of 41.06, led to consideration for him to be selected to play Test cricket for England in their series against South Africa. In a Test squad packed with batsman of the calibre of Denis Compton, Len Hutton, Don Kenyon, and Reg Simpson, Rogers was ultimately not selected to play during the series, with his selection as 12th man during the Fifth Test at The Oval the closest he would come to earning a Test cap.

Rogers scored 2,444 runs at an average of 40.80 in 1952, with his performances that season being praised by Eagar in Hampshire County Cricket. Eagar considered his consistency throughout the season in the absence of a suitable opening partner (McCorkell having retired in 1951) to be admirable, while noting that Hampshire's batting that season was largely carried by Rogers. He played for the Rest in the Test trial match in 1953, having been called into the side as a late replacement for Middlesex's Bill Edrich, who had injured his shoulder. His form dropped in 1953, with Rogers scoring 1,549 runs at an average of 29.78, which contrasted to his previous two seasons in which he had averaged over 40. In 1954, he carried his bat through four completed innings, a record bettered only once in the history of first-class cricket; the 1954 season had been a struggle for most batsman, following a wet summer and matches played on a succession of poor pitches. With the arrival of Roy Marshall and his residential qualification for Hampshire in 1955, that he and Rogers would form a potent opening force, however this did not materialise, with Rogers dropping down the order in 1955 in order to facilitate Marshall's position at the top of the order. Rogers subsequently retired from first-class cricket at the end of that season to go into business with former teammate Jim Bailey, despite having been offered a three-year contract extension and a benefit. With Eagar injured for his final five matches for Hampshire, Rogers deputised as captain in his place, winning four and drawing one as Hampshire finished third in the Championship.

For Hampshire, he made 285 first-class appearances, scoring 15,292 runs at an average of 31.79; he made 26 centuries and 73 half centuries. His highest score of 186 came against Gloucestershire in 1951. He surpassed 1,000 runs for the season every year between 1947 and 1955. Upon his retirement, he was described by the cricket writer John Arlott as "among the county’s greatest players". In addition to playing at first-class level for Hampshire, he also played for the Marylebone Cricket Club on five occasions, and for the South in the North v South fixture once. While playing his sole first-class match for Tom Pearce's personal team in 1952 against Essex, he made 164 runs in a total of 389 all out, with the next highest score being 38.

== Later life ==
Rogers continued to play club cricket for in Southampton for Deanery Cricket Club and the Trojans, and in later life he was a member of the Hampshire committee, where he supported Jimmy Gray in his capacity as chairman. He was also a commentator on Hampshire matches for BBC Radio Solent. Rogers died in Southampton on 7 October 2003, with his funeral being held at Southampton Crematorium on 17 October.
