= George Rogers House =

George Rogers House may refer to:

- George Rogers House (Portsmouth, New Hampshire), listed on the National Register of Historic Places (NRHP)
- George Rogers House (Lake Oswego, Oregon), listed on the NRHP

== See also ==
- Rogers House (disambiguation)
