= Route 146 Historic District =

Historic district in Connecticut, United States

- U.S. National Register of Historic Places
- U.S. Historic district
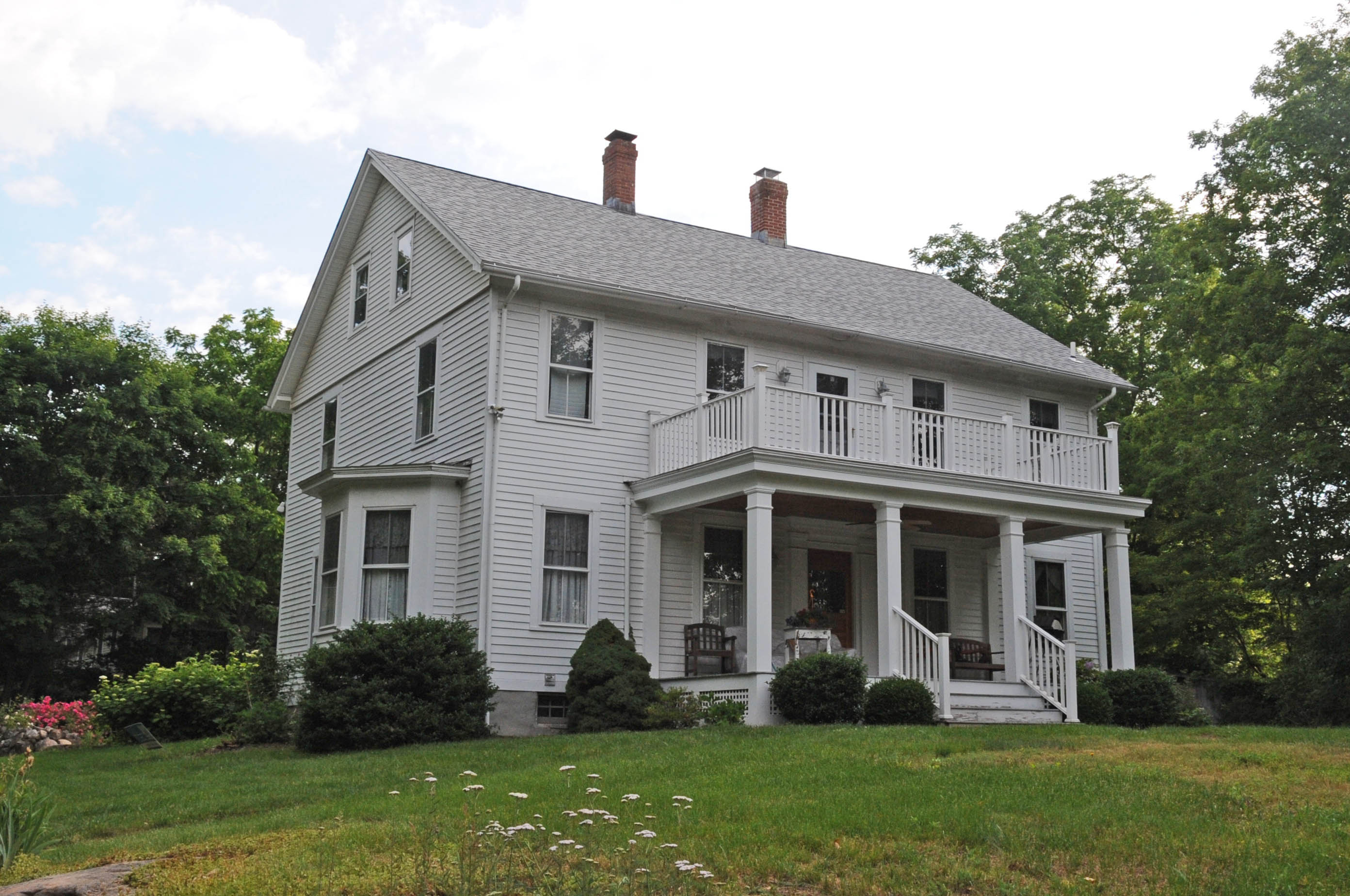
- A house on Route 146

- Location within Connecticut Location within the United States
- Location: Route 146 between Flat Rock Road and West River Bridge, Branford and Guilford, Connecticut
- Coordinates: 41°16′7″N 72°42′50″W
- Area: 169 acres (68 ha)
- Architectural style: Mid 19th Century Revival, Late 19th And Early 20th Century American Movements, Late Victorian
- NRHP reference No.: 90000569
- Added to NRHP: April 5, 1990

The Route 146 Historic District encompasses a historic streetscape in Branford and Guilford, Connecticut. Extending along Connecticut Route 146 between Flat Rock Road in Branford and the West River bridge in Guilford, it includes two centuries of rural residential architecture, and a well-preserved pre-World War II Street layout created as a "state assistance road" in the 1920s. The district was listed on the National Register of Historic Places in 1990.

== Description and history ==
What is now Connecticut Route 146 in Branford and Guilford was originally laid out in the early 18th century, and the surrounding area developed into the early 19th century as a scattered collection of farmsteads. The Railroad which now roughly parallels its route along this stretch, crossing it twice, was opened in 1852, but development remained slow and predominantly agricultural. By 1880, the farms in the area had been joined by a row of houses built for workers at a nearby stone quarry. The first significant changes to the road alignment took place in the 1890s, when the railroad line was elevated and widened to two tracks, with grade crossings replaced by stone overpasses. In the early 20th century, the road was one of the few in the two towns to be designated a "state assistance road", which made available state funding for improvements. In the 1920s and 1930s, the roadway was widened, paved, and its curves and dips were smoothed out.

The district is about 169 acres (68 ha) in size, and includes the entire road right-of-way for Route 146 between the West River in Guilford and Flat Rock Road in Branford. It abuts the Guilford Historic Town Center to the east and the Stony Creek–Thimble Islands Historic District to the west. The built architecture of the district is entirely residential, representing a cross-section of rural styles covering 200 years from the early 18th to early 20th centuries. Several of the houses are early farmsteads of the locally prominent Leete family, whose name is given to the roadway in Guilford (Leete's Island Road). Two houses, the John Rogers House (c. 1750) and the Pelatiah Leete House (1710), are individually listed on the National Register.

== See also ==
- National Register of Historic Places listings in New Haven County, Connecticut
