= Joseph Rogers House =

Joseph Rogers House may refer to:

- Joseph Hale Rogers House, Lexington, Kentucky, listed on the NRHP in Fayette County, Kentucky
- Joseph Rogers House (Newport, Rhode Island), listed on the NRHP in Rhode Island

== See also ==
- Rogers House (disambiguation)
