= John Rogers (sculptor) =

American sculptor (1829–1904)

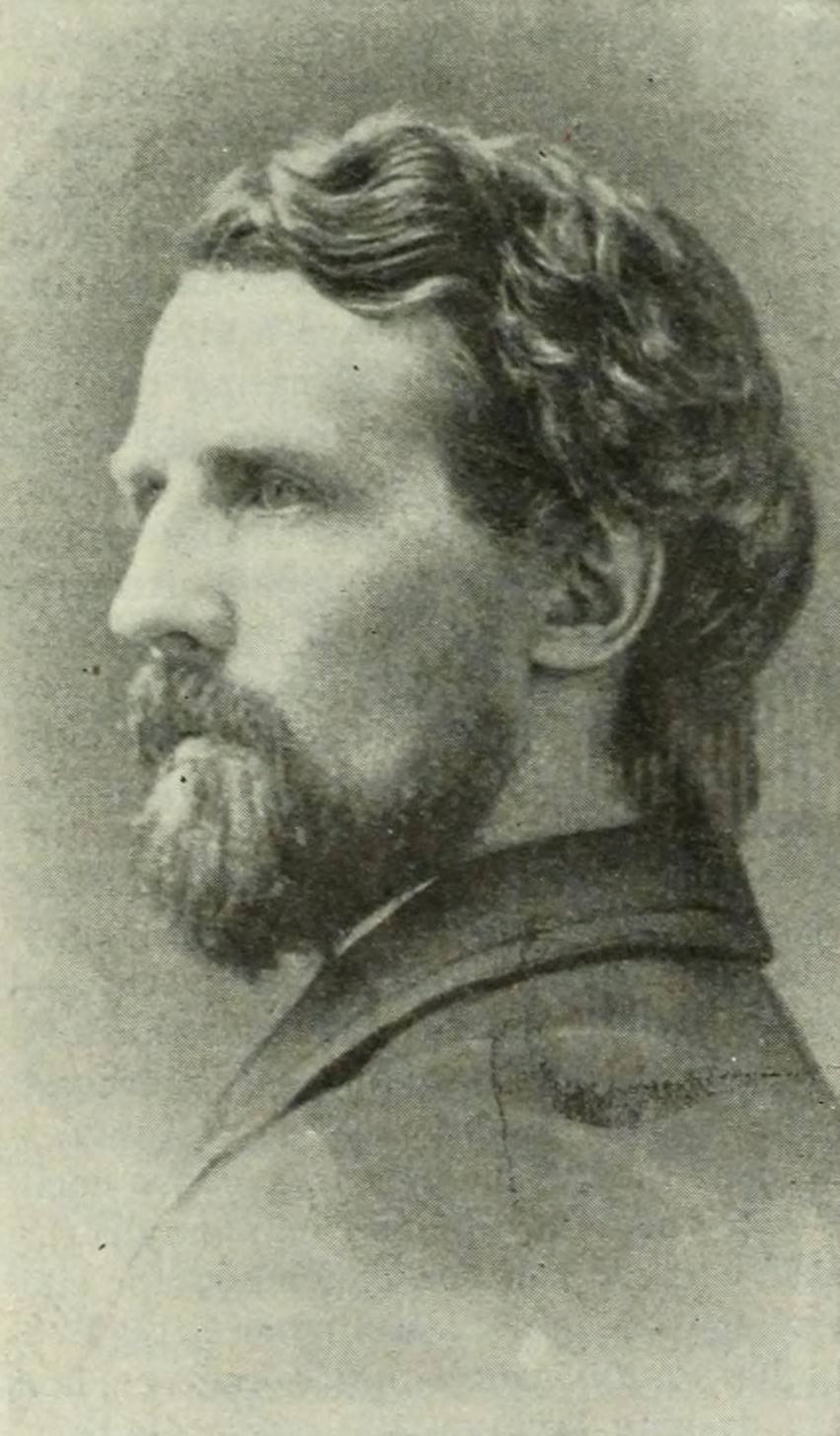
- Born: October 30, 1829; Salem, Massachusetts
- Died: July 26, 1904 (aged 74); New Canaan, Connecticut
- Education: Boston English High School
- Known for: Sculpting
- Studio: John Rogers Studio

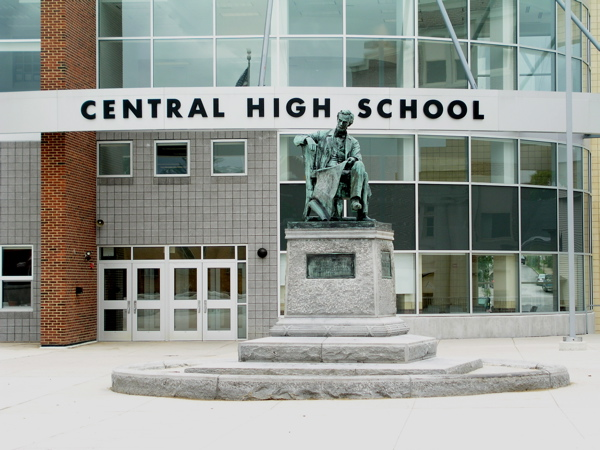
Bronze statue of Abraham Lincoln, by John Rogers, circa 1876, in front of Manchester Central High School, in Manchester, NH

John Rogers (October 30, 1829 – July 26, 1904) was an American sculptor who produced very popular, relatively inexpensive figurines in the latter 19th century.

He became famous for his small genre sculptures, popularly termed "Rogers Groups", which were mass-produced in cast plaster. A total of 80,000 copies of almost 80 Rogers Groups were sold across the United States and abroad.

At the height of their popularity, Rogers' figurines graced the parlors of homes in the United States and were found as far away as Chile and Australia. The English novelist Charles Reade furnished his home with all the Rogers figurines available to him, and in the Dakota Territory, Lt. Col. George Custer and his wife had one. Often selling for $15 apiece, the figurines were affordable to the middle class.

Instead of working in bronze and marble, he sculpted in more affordable plaster, painted the color of putty to hide dust. Rogers was inspired by popular novels, poems and prints as well as the scenes he saw around him.

== Life ==
John Rogers was born in Salem, Massachusetts, on October 30, 1829, to an unsuccessful but well-connected Boston merchant and attended Boston English High School. He gave early evidence of artistic interests and even as a young child, showed a taste and talent for drawing. However, his parents believed that an artist’s life was little better than a vagabond, and in 1845, at the age of sixteen, after what was considered a good education in the town schools, he was placed in a dry-goods store in Boston, with the intention of learning the business. However, Rogers felt certain he was not suited for this line of work, and in 1848 he began his career as a machinist and draftsman at the Amoskeag Locomotive Works in Manchester, New Hampshire, to learn the trade. During this period, Rogers devoted himself to his art with enthusiasm and was drawn to sculpture in particular. He began to model in clay in his leisure hours. Nevertheless, in 1856 Rogers sought work in Hannibal, Missouri as a mechanic with the Hannibal and St. Joseph Railroad. In 1858 he left that position to visit Europe to continue his formal education in sculpting. On his return in 1859 he went to Chicago, where he modeled, for a charity event, "The Checker Players," a group in clay, which attracted much attention. This event marked the beginning of an unusual career.

John Rogers died at his home in New Canaan, Connecticut, in 1904.

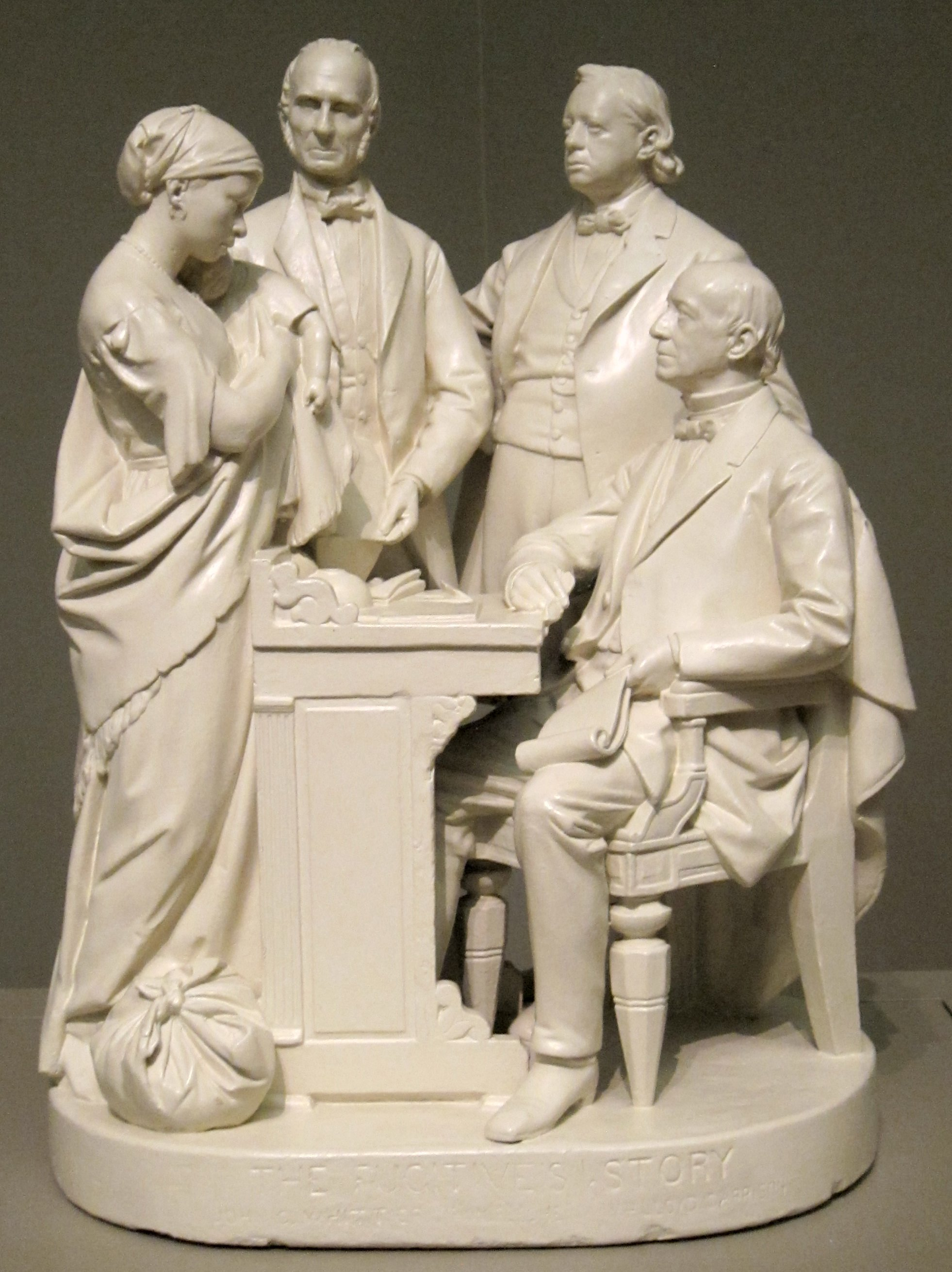
"The Fugitive's Story" by John Rogers.

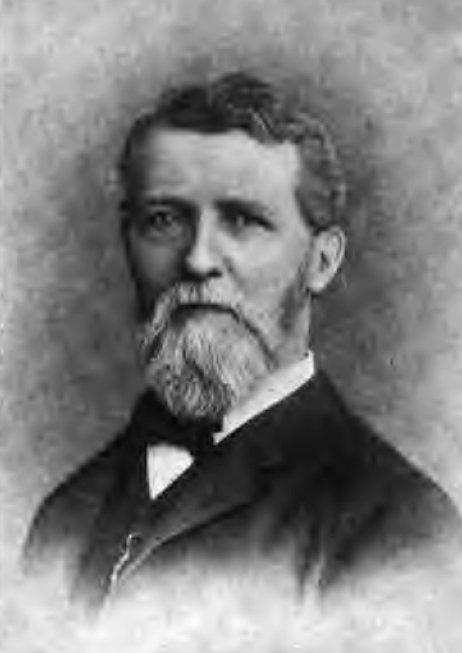
John Rogers

== Recognition ==
John Rogers's statuettes celebrated the lives of ordinary people, urban and rural alike, in portraits that conveyed and endorsed shared American values. Through his Rogers Groups, he offered an unrivaled transcript of the manners, sports, amusements, social customs, domestic interests, costumes, and even modes of furnishing of the period. John Rogers made statues of Civil War soldiers, family groups, literary topics, theater scenes and heroic historical figures. His statues ranged from eight to forty-six inches tall.

Between 1860 and 1893 Rogers sculpted approximately 85 different, mostly patented groups of statuary. During that period, some 25 workman in his New York factory turned out thousands of plaster castings of his works. Some subjects he executed were only reproduced in a few copies. Of others, thousands were sold. Over Rogers' 30-year career, the artist sold over a million dollars of sculpture (about $30,000,000 in 2015, adjusted for inflation). It is estimated that a total of 80,000–100,000 plaster castings of his groups were produced during John Rogers’ lifetime. By the 1880s, it seemed that families who did not have a John Rogers Group were not conforming to the times. Even Abraham Lincoln had a John Rogers Group.

John Rogers statuary were moderately priced, averaging $14.00 a piece (about $425 in 2015 dollars). Rogers' sculptures became a nationwide vogue, and were seen in virtually every art and bookstore window. The appearance of a new John Rogers statue was a major event covered by reporters from the nation's newspapers.

John Rogers’ sculpture of "The Slave Auction," exhibited in New York in 1860, brought him to the notice of the general public. This was the forerunner of the well-known war series of Civil War statuettes which included, among others, the "Picket Guard" (1862), "One more Shot" (1864), "Union Refugees” (1864), "Taking the Oath and drawing Rations" (1866), "Wounded Scout" (1864), and "Council of War" (1868).

Rogers’ works on social subjects, most of which were sculpted following the Civil War, were also very popular. Among the most commonly found John Rogers Groups today are "Coming to the Parson" (1870), " We Boys" (1872), "The Favored Scholar" (1873), "Going for the Cows" (1873) and "Checkers up at the Farm" (1875).

Rogers also sculpted several statues illustrating passages from literature, including a series of three groups illustrating Washington Irving's Rip Van Winkle (1871) as well as "Why don't You speak for Yourself?" (1885) from Henry Wadsworth Longfellow's The Courtship of Miles Standish. In addition, John Rogers frequently used subjects from Shakespeare, including “The Wrestlers” (1881) from As You Like It, "Is it so nominated in the Bond?" (1880) from The Merchant of Venice, "Ha! I like Not That" (1882) from Othello, and others.

Rogers was also commissioned to execute a number of monumental sculptures, including the sculpture of General John F. Reynolds (1881–1883), which stands before the Philadelphia City Hall, and in 1887 he exhibited "Ichabod Crane and the Headless Horseman," a huge bronze group.

While Rogers produced plaster castings of his groups in the United States, during his lifetime, seven of his groups were copied in England in Parian ware, which is an unpolished porcelain, by at least two companies, Robert Cooke and Robinson & Leadbeater. There may have been other makers of these Parian-ware Rogers Groups. While not definitive, it is assumed these copies were unauthorized, as there is no record of Rogers having made arrangements for their manufacture. The groups that were produced in Parian ware include "One More Shot", The Wounded Scout", "Checker Players", "Camp Life, The Card Players", "Taking the Oath and Drawing the Rations" and "Union Refugees." In addition, some of these English copies were produced in majolica (a glazed porcelain). While the Parians are always white, the majolica versions have been found in white, red, green, beige and brown. These Parian and majolica versions were essentially "knock offs" since while the subject and compositions were extremely similar to the Rogers originals, these Parian manufacturers actually "resculpted' the pieces using their own staff artists. So, there are numerous variations in the details between the original plasters and the Parian copies. However, Rogers himself did sculpt "The Fisher Girl" of which 11 copies were cast in England by Copeland in Parian ware, as a lottery winning for subscribers/members of the Cosmopolitan Art Association in 1861.

In 1878 Rogers opened his small studio in New Canaan, Connecticut. The popularity of Rogers' figurines was already declining when poor health forced his retirement in 1893 and had significantly diminished by the time of his death in 1904.

His studio at The New Canaan Historical Society, 13 Oenoke Ridge, New Canaan Connecticut, now known as the John Rogers Studio, was designated a U.S. National Historic Landmark in 1965.
