= Rogers House (Holden, Massachusetts) =

Historic house in Massachusetts, United States

- U.S. National Register of Historic Places
- U.S. Historic district – Contributing property
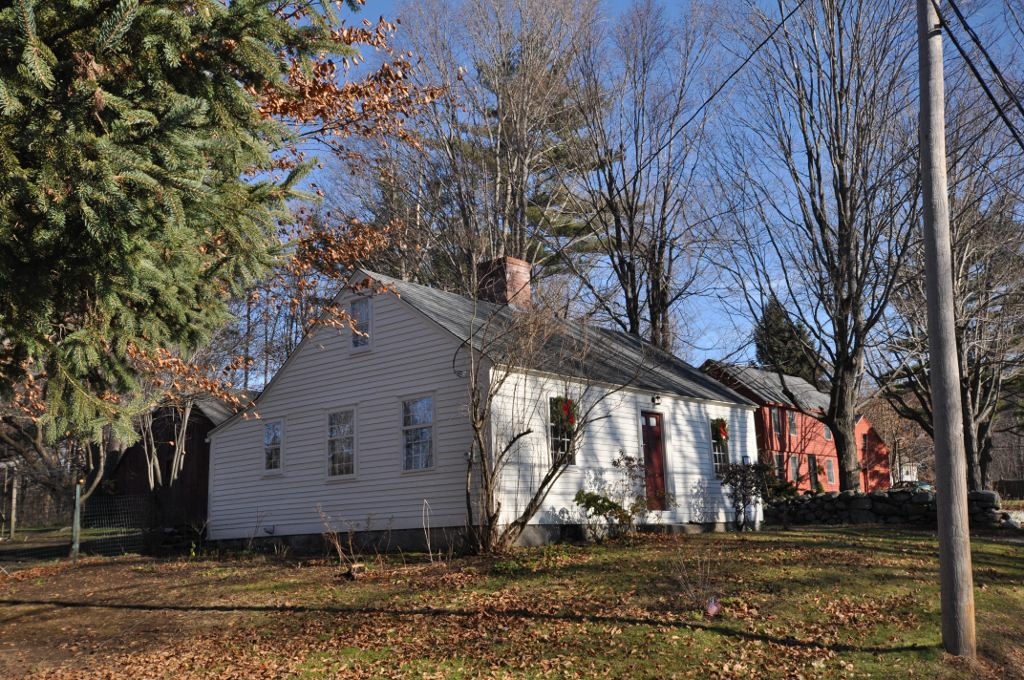

- Location within Massachusetts Location within the United States
- Location: 28 Boyden Road, Holden, Massachusetts
- Coordinates: 42°20′59″N 71°51′29″W
- Built: 1733
- Architectural style: Colonial
- Part of: Holden Center Historic District (ID95001031)
- NRHP reference No.: 82004471

Significant dates
- Added to NRHP: June 1, 1982
- Designated CP: August 31, 1995

The Rogers House is a historic house in Holden, Massachusetts. The 1.5-story Cape-style wood-frame house was built sometime before 1733, and is possibly the oldest building in Holden (there is no firm evidence for a traditionally-ascribed date of 1722 for its construction). It is the best-preserved example of its style in the area, which was once somewhat common.

The house was listed on the National Register of Historic Places in 1982, and was included in an expansion of the Holden Center Historic District in 1995.

== See also ==
- National Register of Historic Places listings in Worcester County, Massachusetts
