= Richard Jackson House =

Historic house in New Hampshire, United States

- U.S. National Register of Historic Places
- U.S. National Historic Landmark
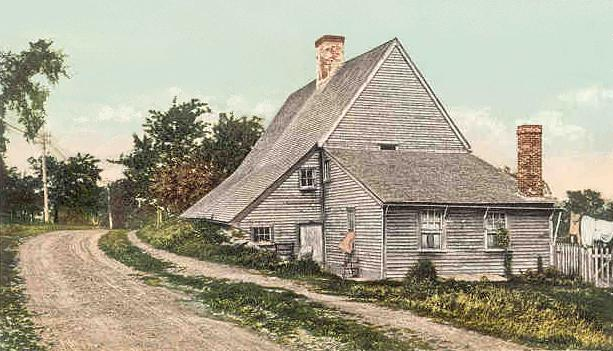
- ca. 1909 postcard image

- Location within New Hampshire Location within the United States
- Location: 76 Northwest Street, Portsmouth, New Hampshire
- Coordinates: 43°4′51.28″N 70°45′59.35″W
- Area: approximately 1-acre (4,000 m^{2})
- Built: 1664
- Architect: Richard Jackson
- Architectural style: Colonial
- NRHP reference No.: 68000009

Significant dates
- Added to NRHP: November 24, 1968
- Designated NHL: November 24, 1968

The Richard Jackson House is a historic house in Portsmouth, New Hampshire. Built in 1664 by Richard Jackson, it is the oldest wood-frame house in New Hampshire. It was designated a National Historic Landmark in 1968. It is now a historic house museum owned by Historic New England, and is open two Saturdays a month between June and October.

== History ==
Richard Jackson was a woodworker, farmer, and mariner, and built the oldest portion of this house on his family's 25-acre (10 ha) plot, located on an inlet off the Piscataqua River, north of Portsmouth's central business district. Jackson's house resembles English post-medieval prototypes, but is notably American in its extravagant use of wood. The house as first built consisted of a two-story structure with two rooms on each floor, flanking a massive central chimney. Not long afterward, a lean-to section was added to the rear (north side) of the house, which slopes nearly to the ground. Further single-story additions were made to the gable ends of the house, probably c. 1764.

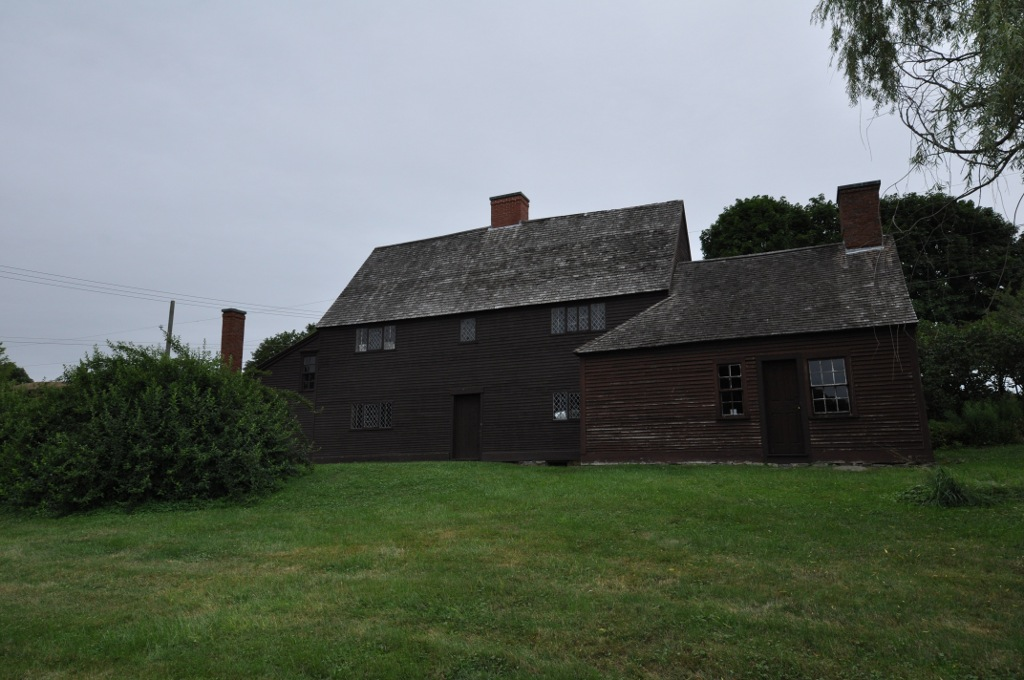
House in 2013

The founder of the Society for the Preservation of New England Antiquities (SPNEA, now Historic New England), William Sumner Appleton, acquired the house for SPNEA in 1924 from a member of the seventh generation of Jacksons to live there. Appleton undertook a restoration of the property, removing 19th century modifications, and providing the building with leaded diamond-pane windows of a type that it would have had in the 17th century.

It was declared a National Historic Landmark in 1968.

The George Rogers House, located just east of the Jackson house, is also a Historic New England property, but is not open to the public.

== See also ==
- Oldest buildings in America
- List of the oldest buildings in New Hampshire
- List of National Historic Landmarks in New Hampshire
- National Register of Historic Places listings in Rockingham County, New Hampshire
