= William Rogers House =

Will Rogers House or William Rogers House may refer to:

- William A. Rogers House, Eutaw, Alabama, listed on the National Register of Historic Places (NRHP)
- Will Rogers House (Los Angeles, California), listed in the NRHP in California
- Will Rogers Hotel, Claremore, Oklahoma, listed in the NRHP in Oklahoma
- Will Rogers Birthplace, Oologah, Oklahoma, NRHP-listed
- William Rogers House (Bishopville, South Carolina), NRHP-listed
- William S. Rogers House, Chappell Hill, Texas, listed in the NRHP in Texas

== See also ==
- Rogers House (disambiguation)
