= Joe Rogers =

Joe Rogers may refer to:

- Joe Rogers (politician) (1964–2013), Lieutenant Governor of Colorado 1999–2003
- Joe Rogers (businessman) (1919–2017), American businessman, co-founder of Waffle House
- Joe Rogers Jr. (born 1950/51), American businessman, chairman and CEO of Waffle House
- Joe Rogers (footballer, born 1876) (1876–?), English football player
- Joe Rogers (Australian footballer) (1907–1966), Australian rules footballer

== See also ==
- Joseph Rogers (disambiguation)
