= Joseph Rodgers =

Joseph Rodgers may refer to:

- Joseph Rodgers (bishop), Roman Catholic bishop of Killaloe
- Joseph Lee Rodgers, American psychologist

== See also ==
- Joseph Rogers (disambiguation)
- Joe M. Rodgers, American construction company executive and United States Ambassador to France
