= Rodgers House =

Rodgers House may refer to:

== Places and structures ==
=== United States ===
(by state, then city)

- Humphreys-Rodgers House, Huntsville, Alabama, listed on the National Register of Historic Places (NRHP)
- Patrick Rodgers Farm, Pleasant Hill, California, NRHP-listed
- Moses Rodgers House, Stockton, California, listed on the NRHP in San Joaquin County, California
- Thomas Rodgers House, Paris, Kentucky, listed on the NRHP in Bourbon County, Kentucky
- Rodgers House (Shelbyville, Kentucky), listed on the NRHP in Shelby County, Kentucky

== See also ==
- Rogers House (disambiguation)
