= Pelatiah Leete House =

Historic house in Connecticut, United States

- U.S. National Register of Historic Places
- U.S. Historic district – Contributing property
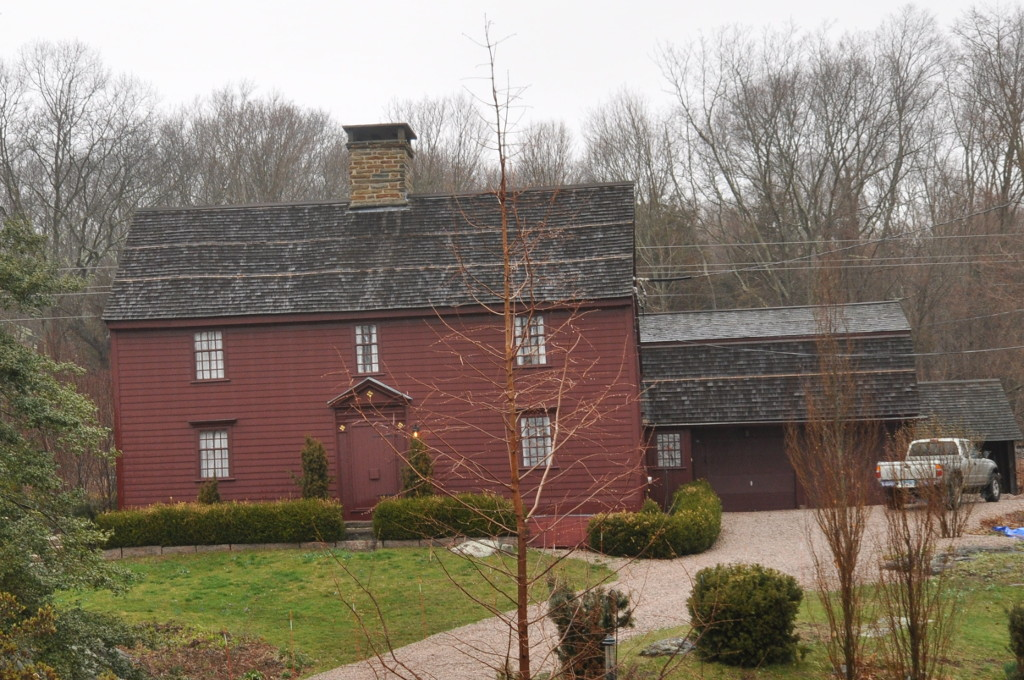

- Location within Connecticut Location within the United States
- Location: 575 Leete's Island Road, Guilford, Connecticut
- Coordinates: 41°15′58″N 72°42′53″W
- Area: 2 acres (0.81 ha)
- Built: 1710
- Architectural style: Saltbox
- Part of: Route 146 Historic District (ID90000569)
- NRHP reference No.: 74002048

Significant dates
- Added to NRHP: October 1, 1974
- Designated CP: April 5, 1990

The Pelatiah Leete House is a historic house at 575 Leete's Island Road CT 146 in Guilford, Connecticut, United States. Built in 1710 by Pelatiah Leete, it is the oldest surviving house associated with the locally prominent Leete family, who were among the founders of the New Haven Colony. The house was listed on the National Register of Historic Places in 1974.

== Description and history ==
The Pelatiah Leete House is located in a rural-residential setting west of Guilford center, on the north side of Leet's Island Road (CT 146) a short way East of Moose Hill Road. The house is set well back from the road, near the Railroad right-of-way that runs roughly parallel to the roadway. It is a 2 1/2-story wood-frame structure, with a gabled roof, central chimney, and clapboarded exterior. The main facade is three bays wide, with sash windows arranged around a center entrance. The entrance is framed by a Greek Revival surround with fluted pilasters and a gabled pediment. The rear of the house has an extended leanto section, giving the house a classic New England colonial saltbox appearance. The interior retains original fireplaces and other elements of interior finish.

The house was built in 1710 by Pelatiah Leete, the grandson of William Leete, one of the founders and a governor of the New Haven Colony, and was built on land originally settled by William Leete. It is the oldest surviving house of several in the area belong to members of the Leete family.

== See also ==
- National Register of Historic Places listings in New Haven County, Connecticut
- List of the oldest buildings in Connecticut
