= Rogers House (Huntington, New York) =

Historic house in New York, United States

- U.S. National Register of Historic Places
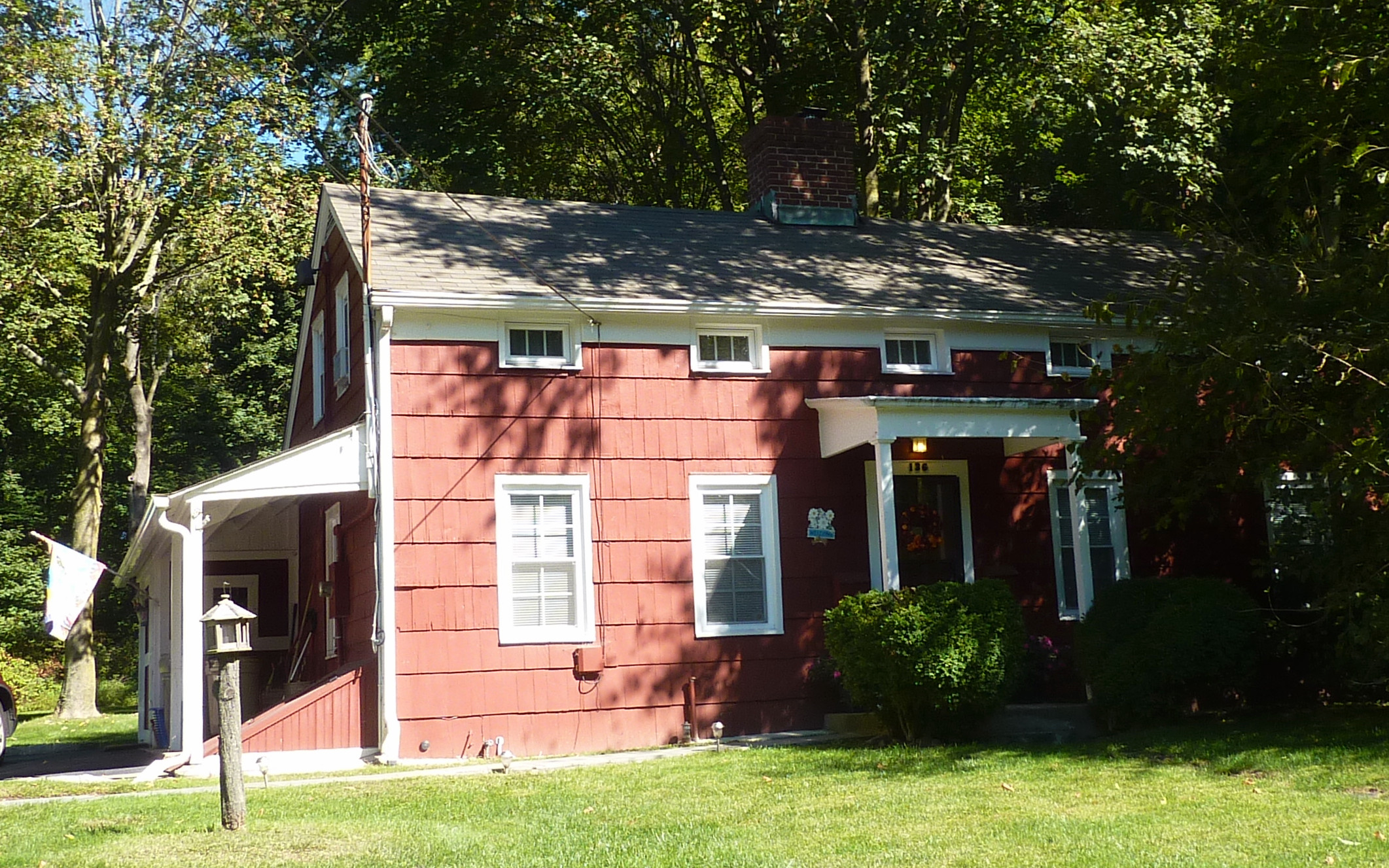

- Location within New York Location within the United States
- Location: 136 Spring Rd., Huntington, New York
- Coordinates: 40°51′57″N 73°24′56″W
- Area: 0.8 acres (0.32 ha)
- Built: 1820
- Architectural style: Greek Revival
- MPS: Huntington Town MRA
- NRHP reference No.: 85002571
- Added to NRHP: September 26, 1985

The Rogers House is an historic house located at 136 Spring Road in Huntington, New York, which was built in 1820 in the Greek Revival style. It was added to the National Register of Historic Places in 1985.

== See also ==
- John Rogers House (Huntington, New York), located at 627 Half Hollow Road in Dix Hills, which was also added to the National Register of Historic Places on the same date.
