= Joseph Rogers (West Indian cricketer) =

West Indian cricketer

Joseph Cephas S. Rogers (died 21 January 1946) was a West Indian cricketer who played for Trinidad and Tobago cricket team between 1908 and 1922. He took fifty-one wickets at a bowling average of 16.74, and scored six half-centuries with the bat. He died in Trinidad. He also represented the West Indies cricket team during a 1910/11 tour by the Marylebone Cricket Club.
