= Rogers House (Little Rock, Arkansas) =

Historic house in Arkansas, United States

- U.S. National Register of Historic Places
- U.S. Historic district – Contributing property
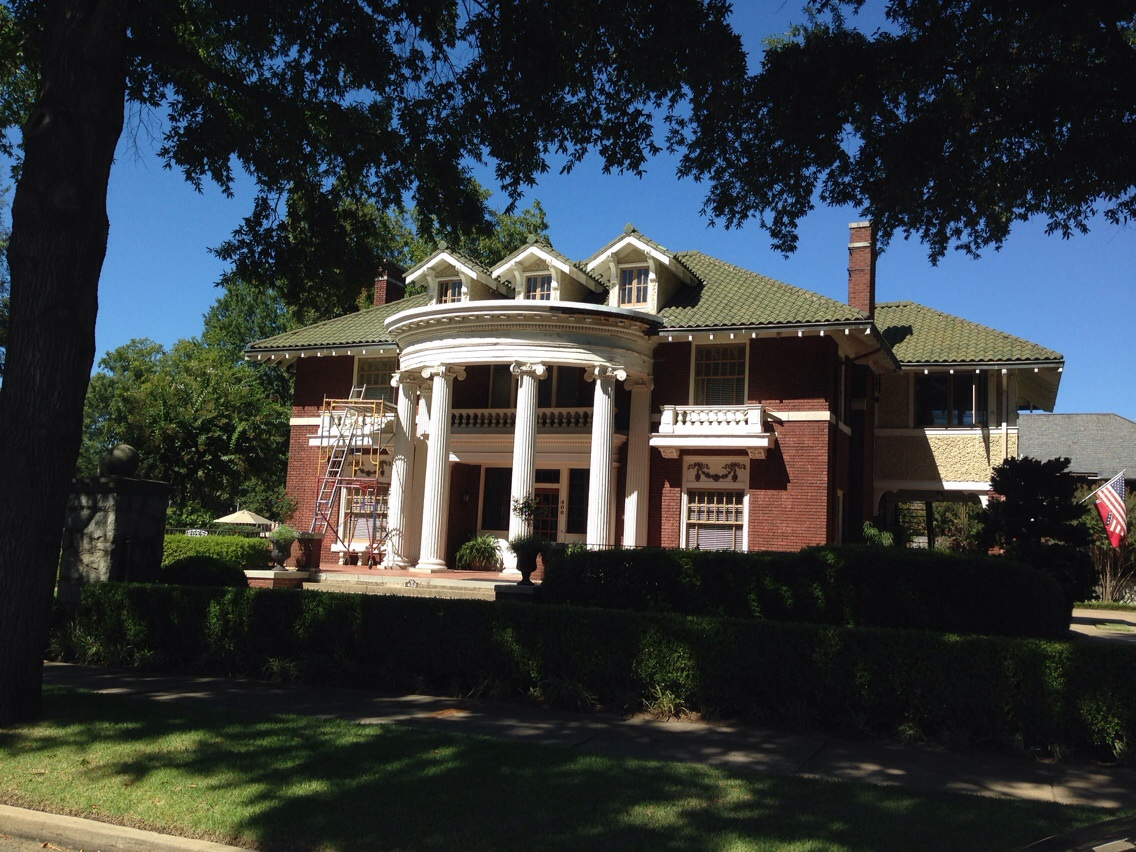

- Location within Arkansas Location within the United States
- Location: 400 W. 18th St., Little Rock, Arkansas
- Coordinates: 34°43′56″N 92°16′40″W
- Area: less than one acre
- Built: 1914
- Architect: Charles L. Thompson
- Architectural style: Colonial Revival
- Part of: Governor's Mansion Historic District (ID78000620)
- MPS: Thompson, Charles L., Design Collection TR
- NRHP reference No.: 82000922

Significant dates
- Added to NRHP: December 22, 1982
- Designated CP: September 13, 1978

The Rogers House is a historic house at 400 West 18th Street in Little Rock, Arkansas. It is a large two story brick building, with an eclectic combination of Georgian Revival and American Craftsman features. It was designed by Arkansas architect Charles L. Thompson and completed in 1914. It has a green tile hip roof with extended eaves that show Craftsman style rafter ends, and is pierced by gabled dormers, which also have extended eaves, with large brackets for support. A half-round entry portico projects from the front, supported by monumental fluted Ionic columns. The house is one of Thompson's more imposing designs.

The house was listed on the National Register of Historic Places in 1982.

== See also ==
- National Register of Historic Places listings in Little Rock, Arkansas
