= Holden Center Historic District =

Historic district in Massachusetts, United States

- U.S. National Register of Historic Places
- U.S. Historic district
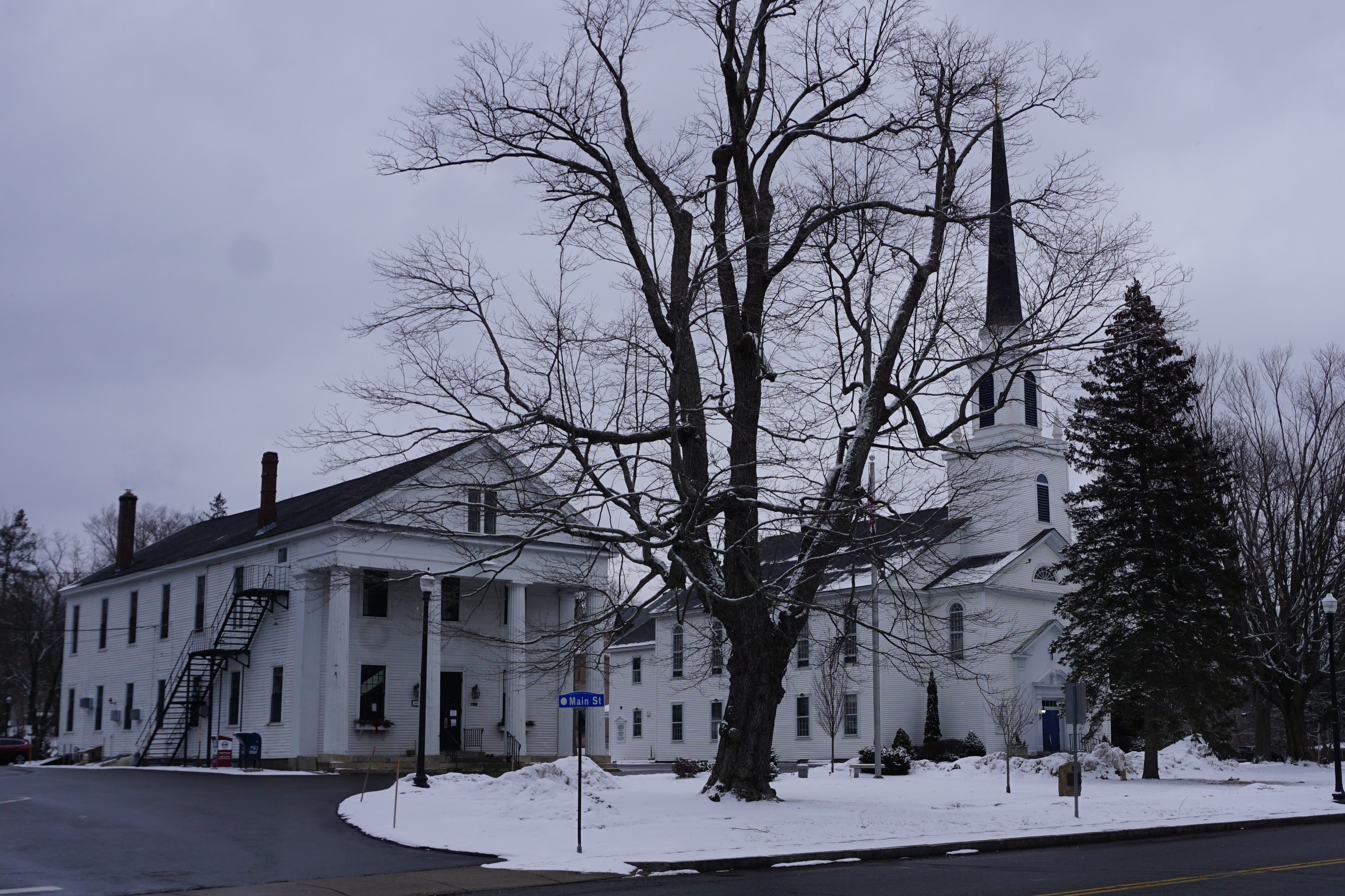

- Location within Massachusetts Location within the United States
- Location: Holden, Massachusetts
- Coordinates: 42°21′3″N 71°51′47″W
- Built: 1789
- Architect: Harrington, Martin; Multiple
- Architectural style: Greek Revival, Georgian, Romanesque
- NRHP reference No.: 77000194 (original); 95001031 (increase)

Significant dates
- Added to NRHP: December 22, 1977
- Boundary increase: August 31, 1995

The Holden Center Historic District encompasses a significant portion of the historic village center of Holden, Massachusetts. When first listed on the National Register of Historic Places, the district included only nine buildings, including the 1836 town hall, the 1789 First Congregational Church, the 1835 First Baptist Church, and the 1880 Old Post Office, as well as the 1759 Old Burying Ground. The district was enlarged in 1995 to incorporate the historically significant residential portions of the village.

== See also ==
- National Register of Historic Places listings in Worcester County, Massachusetts
