= Bob Rogers House =

Historic house in Arkansas, United States

- Formerly listed on the U.S. National Register of Historic Places
- Location within Arkansas Location within the United States
- Location: Jct. of S. Spring St. and W. Woodruff Ave., Searcy, Arkansas
- Coordinates: 35°14′45″N 91°44′14″W
- Area: less than one acre
- Built: 1870
- Architectural style: Greek Revival, I-house
- MPS: White County MPS
- NRHP reference No.: 91001219

Significant dates
- Added to NRHP: September 13, 1991
- Removed from NRHP: January 26, 2018

The Bob Rogers House was a historic house at South Spring Street and West Woodruff Avenue in Searcy, Arkansas. It was a two-story wood frame I-house, with a gabled roof, weatherboard siding, and a brick foundation. Its most prominent feature was a projecting pedimented Greek Revival portico. It was built about 1870, and was one of the city's few examples of Greek Revival architecture.

The house was listed on the National Register of Historic Places in 1991. It has been listed as destroyed in the Arkansas Historic Preservation Program database, and was delisted in 2018.

== See also ==
- National Register of Historic Places listings in White County, Arkansas
