= Joseph Rogers (English cricketer) =

English cricketer

Personal information
- Born: 1 February 1908; Oxford
- Died: 28 August 1968 (aged 60); Bath, Somerset
- Batting: Right-handed
- Bowling: Right-arm fast

Domestic team information
- Years: Team
- 1929–1933: Gloucestershire
- Source: CricInfo, 6 December 2022

Joseph Alfred Rogers (1 February 1908 – 28 August 1968) was an English cricketer from Bath, Somerset who played for Gloucestershire between 1929 and 1933. A right-handed bat and right-arm fast bowler, Rogers made 46 first-class appearances, taking 45 wickets at a bowling average of 36.53 runs per wicket. His batting yielded 461 runs with one half-century. He also played minor county cricket for Oxfordshire County Cricket Club. His great-grandfather Charles Rogers played for the Marylebone Cricket Club, and Charles' five sons and grandsons also played first-class cricket.
