= Joseph Rogers (neuroscientist) =

- Born: 1945 (age 80–81); United States
- Education: B.A. Emory University; Ph.D. University of California, San Diego
- Occupation: neuroscientist
- Organization: SRI International
- Known for: Alzheimer's Disease research, neurodegenerative disorders
- Spouse: Mimi Rogers
- Children: 3

Joseph Rogers is an American neuroscientist known for his contributions to the research of Alzheimer's disease and other neurodegenerative disorders.

== Biography ==
He received a B.A. from Emory University, a Ph.D. from the University of California, San Diego, and completed a postdoctoral fellowship at the Salk Institute, later serving there as a staff scientist. He has also held posts at University of Massachusetts Medical School and as a principal investigator in New England's Alzheimer's Disease Center at Harvard University.

== Research ==
The role of inflammation in Alzheimer's disease and other neurodegenerative disorders has been a main focus of his work. Contributions include "Inflammation and Alzheimer's Disease Pathogenesis" in Neurobiology of Aging, "Inflammation, Anti-inflammatory Agents, and Alzheimer’s Disease: The Last 22 Years" co-authored with Pat McGeer and Edith McGeer, and as an editor of scholarly publications.

== Other professional activities ==
Rogers founded Sun Health Research Institute in 1986 near Phoenix, AZ, and served as its President and Senior Scientist until Banner Health's acquisition of the institute in 2008. He later served as Executive Director of Health Sciences in SRI International's Biosciences Division from 2012 to 2020.

== Honors ==
Rogers received a Lifetime Achievement Award from the national Alzheimer's Association.
