= G. P. Codie's Ground =

Cricket ground in Eccles, Lancashire, England

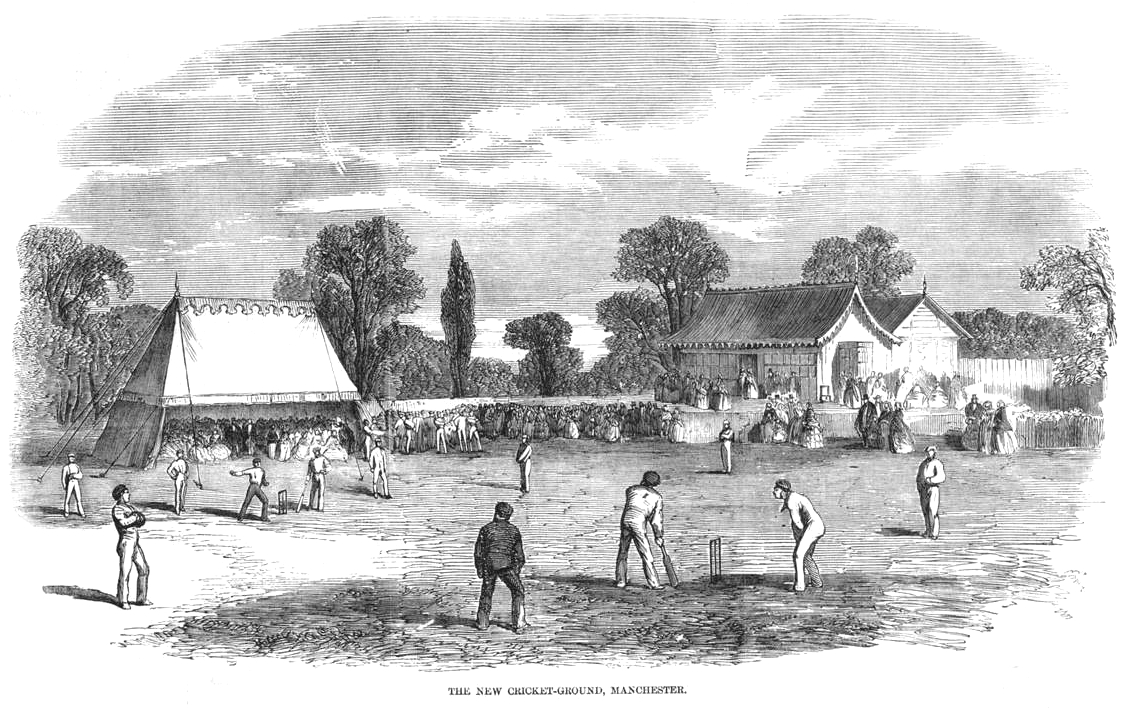
- The new cricket-ground on its opening day Illustrated London News
- Interactive map of G. P. Codie's Ground

Ground information
- Location: Eccles, Lancashire
- Country: England
- Coordinates: 53.4822°N 2.3421°W
- Establishment: 1857

Team information
Manchester Cricket Club	(1857–1858)
- As of 4 September 2010; Source: profile

G. P. Codie's Ground was a cricket ground in Eccles, Lancashire. The first recorded match on the ground was in 1857, when Manchester Cricket Club played Surrey in the ground's first first-class match on 10-11 June. The Western Club had commenced operations on their new ground, on Saturday, 23rd May. The following year the ground held its second and final first-class match when Manchester Cricket Club played Sussex.

During its existence, the ground was the home venue of Westerns Cricket Club. Westerns played the final recorded match held on the ground in 1881 when they played Cheshire. The ground was located at the eastern end of Barton Lane and is today covered by housing.
