= John Rogers Studio =

Museum in New Canaan, Connecticut

- U.S. National Register of Historic Places
- U.S. National Historic Landmark
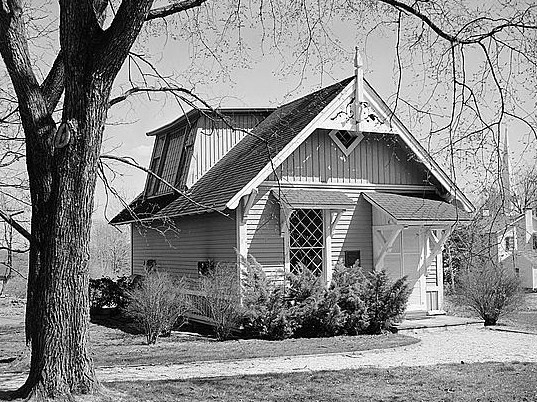
- John Rogers Studio

- Location within Connecticut Location within the United States
- Location: 13 Oenoke Ridge, New Canaan, Connecticut
- Coordinates: 41°9′0.83″N 73°29′52.74″W
- Built: 1878
- Architect: Peabody & Stearns
- Architectural style: Late Victorian
- NRHP reference No.: 66000881

Significant dates
- Added to NRHP: October 15, 1966
- Designated NHL: December 21, 1965

The John Rogers Studio and Museum is the preserved studio of sculptor John Rogers, a popular American artist called "the people's sculptor" in the latter 19th century. It is located at 13 Oenoke Ridge in New Canaan, Connecticut, on the grounds of the New Canaan Historical Society, which opens it to the public.

== History and architecture ==
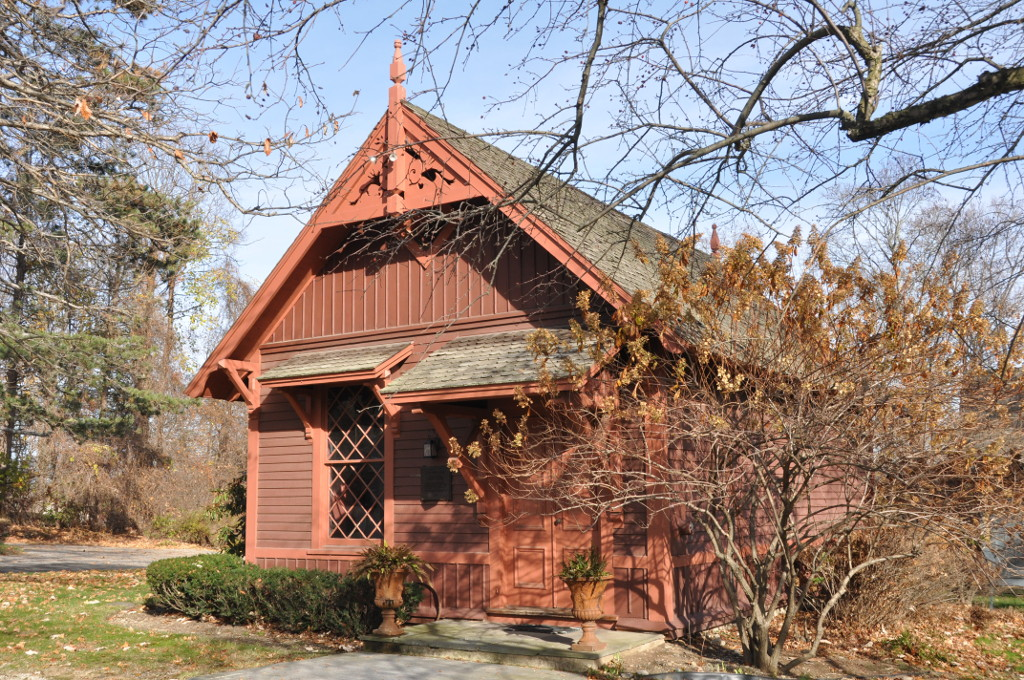
The studio in 2015

The studio is a Gothic-Victorian gable-roofed building built in 1878. John Rogers's popularity stemmed from the way his statuary groups created scenes of everyday life with a sentimental feel that has been compared to the much later Norman Rockwell. Instead of working in bronze and marble, he sculpted in more affordable plaster, painted the color of putty to hide dust.

The studio was declared a National Historic Landmark in 1965. In 2003, a $95,000 matching grant under the Save America's Treasures program included financing for a climate-control and air-filtration system to ensure long-term preservation of both the building and the collection.

== Collection ==
The studio houses a collection of "Rogers Groups"—plaster statuettes often depicting two or more people. The display area has been reconfigured to reflect the feeling of the artist's studio.Rogers Groups often depicted people interacting with each other in a sentimental scene. According to the National Historic Landmarks Program of the National Park Service, the museum's collection is "one of the finest collections of Rogers groups in the nation".

Rogers was prolific as well as popular. During his 33-year career he produced almost 80,000 plaster copies of his 86 "Rogers Groups." His statuettes decorated Victorian parlors throughout the United States.

Sculpture on display includes "The Traveling Magician", showing a magician pulling a rabbit out of a hat for two children, and "The Neighboring Pews", depicting a moment among people in church. "Union Refugees" depicts a scene from the Civil War.

== See also ==
- List of National Historic Landmarks in Connecticut
- National Register of Historic Places listings in Fairfield County, Connecticut
