= John Rogers House (Huntington, New York) =

Historic house in New York, United States

- U.S. National Register of Historic Places
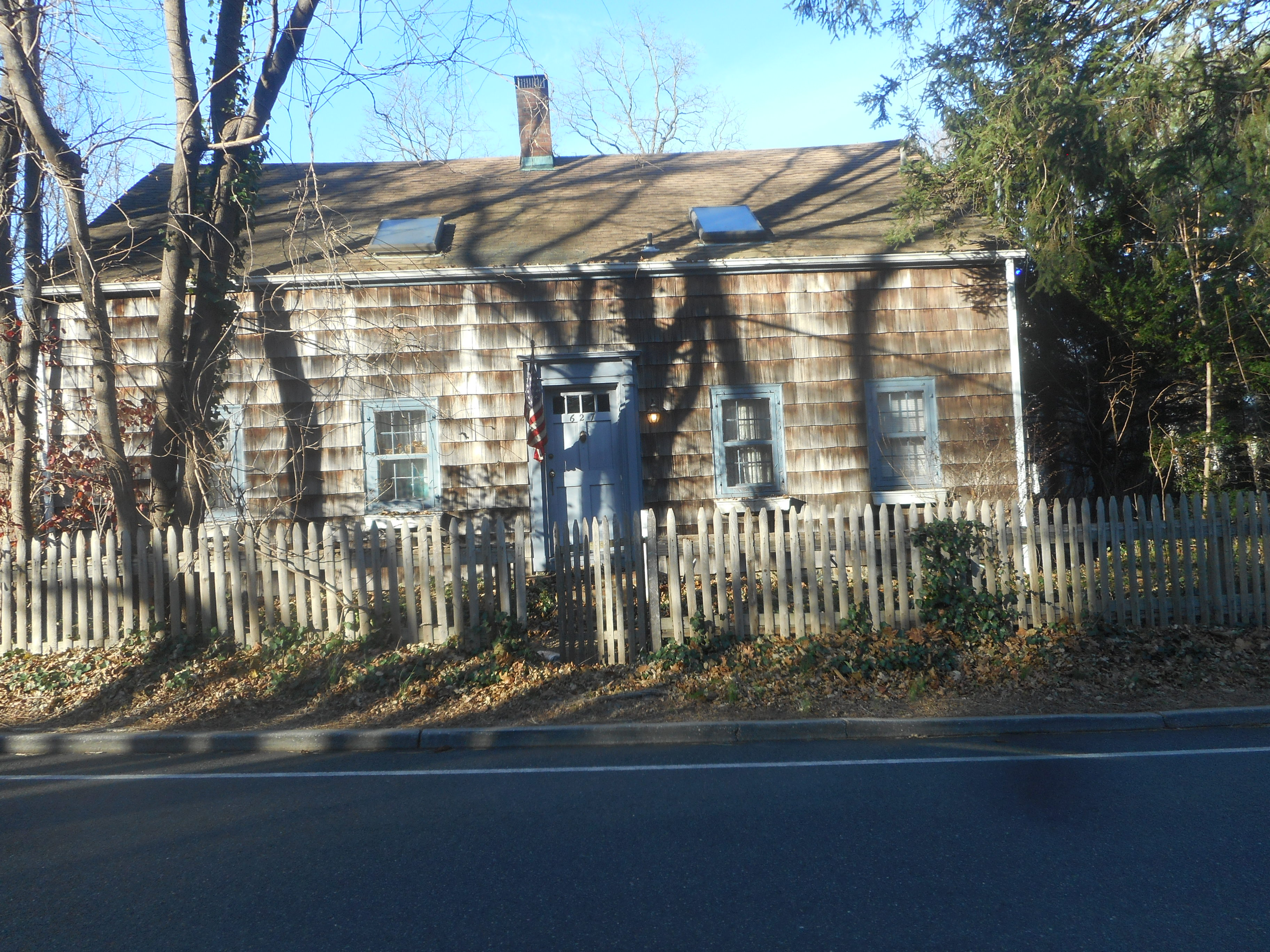
- John Rogers House in November 2019

- Location within New York Location within the United States
- Location: 627 Half Hollow Rd., Dix Hills, New York
- Coordinates: 40°47′18″N 73°20′50″W
- Area: 1.2 acres (0.49 ha)
- Built: 1732
- Architect: Rogers, John
- Architectural style: Federal
- MPS: Huntington Town MRA
- NRHP reference No.: 85002572
- Added to NRHP: September 26, 1985

The John Rogers House is an historic house located at 627 Half Hollow Road in Dix Hills, New York. It was built in 1732 by John Rogers in the Federal style.

On September 26, 1985, it was added to the National Register of Historic Places.

== See also ==
- Rogers House (Huntington, New York) for the house at 136 Spring Road in Huntington, which was also added to the National Register of Historic Places on the same date.
