= Joseph Rogers House (Newport, Rhode Island) =

Historic house in Rhode Island, United States

- U.S. National Register of Historic Places
- U.S. National Historic Landmark District – Contributing property
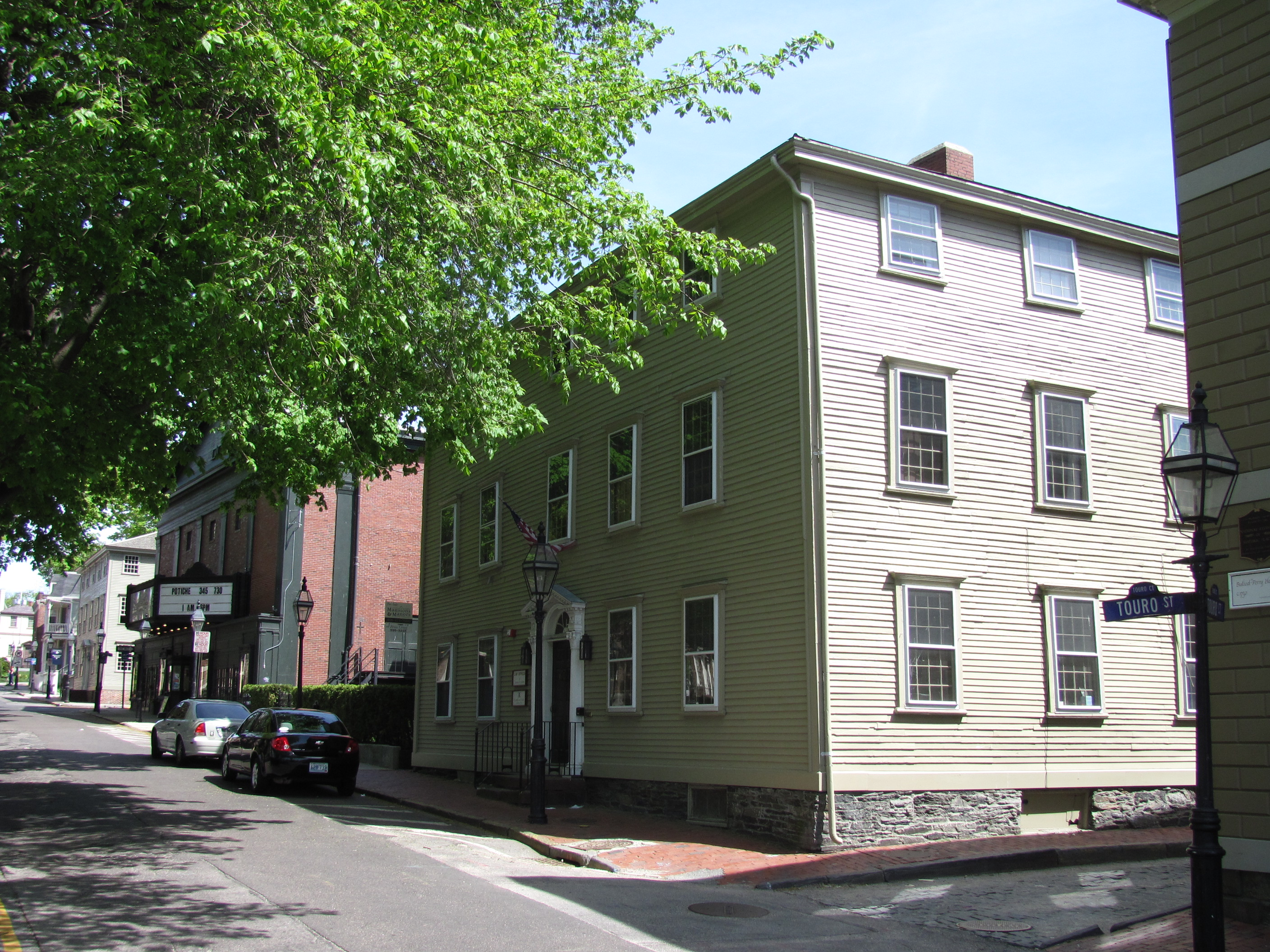
- Joseph Rogers House

- Location within Rhode Island Location within the United States
- Location: Newport, Rhode Island
- Coordinates: 41°29′23″N 71°18′51″W
- Built: 1790
- Part of: Newport Historic District (ID68000001)
- NRHP reference No.: 72000031

Significant dates
- Added to NRHP: February 23, 1972
- Designated NHLDCP: November 24, 1968

The Joseph Rogers House (also known as "Robert Rogers House") is an historic house at 37 Touro Street, facing Washington Square in Newport, Rhode Island. It is a three-story wood-frame structure with a hip roof. Its main facade is five bays wide, with a center entry framed by pilasters and topped by a fanlight. The house was built c. 1790 by Joseph Rogers, a merchant. It remained in private hands until the 1890s, when it was adapted for use first as a convent, and then as a parochial school, by the Roman Catholic Diocese of Providence. It was given to the Preservation Society of Newport County in 1961, and Dr. and Mrs. David Van Pelt restored the building for the Society, which used it as its headquarters. The Society moved its headquarters to 424 Bellevue Avenue in 1992.

The building was listed on the National Register of Historic Places in 1972.

== See also ==
- National Register of Historic Places listings in Newport County, Rhode Island
