= Herbert Rogers =

English cricketer and soldier (1893–1916)

Personal information
- Full name: Herbert James Rogers
- Born: 6 March 1893; Frimley, Surrey, England
- Died: 12 October 1916 (aged 23) near Le Transloy, Somme, France
- Batting: Left-handed
- Bowling: Right-arm off break

Domestic team information
- Years: Team
- 1912–1914: Hampshire

Career statistics
Competition	First-class
Matches	7
Runs scored	69
Batting average	5.57
100s/50s	–/–
Top score	18
Balls bowled	66
Wickets	1
Bowling average	62.00
5 wickets in innings	–
10 wickets in match	–
Best bowling	1/26
Catches/stumpings	–/–
- Source: Cricinfo, 30 January 2010

Herbert James Rogers (6 March 1893 – 12 October 1916) was an English first-class cricketer and soldier.

== Cricket and WWI service ==
The son of Peter and Ellen Rogers, he was born at Frimley in March 1893. He was educated in Oxford at the Bedford House School. A club cricketer for North Oxford Cricket Club, he was initially eligible to play county cricket for Worcestershire. However, his performances at club level caught the attention of Hampshire secretary Francis Bacon, who invited him to join the ground staff at Northlands Road. After completing his residential qualification, he made his debut in first-class cricket for Hampshire against Yorkshire at Sheffield in the 1912 County Championship, with him making a further two appearances in that season. The following season, Rogers made just a single appearance in the County Championship, before making three further appearances in the 1914 County Championship. Described by the Oxford Mail as being "almost unplayable" on his day and possessing remarkable length and breaks, in his seven first-class matches for Hampshire his off break bowling claimed just a single wicket for an overall cost of 62 runs. As a batsman, he scored 69 runs with a highest score of 18.

Shortly after the start of the First World War, Rogers enlisted into the Oxfordshire and Buckinghamshire Light Infantry. He was commissioned as a second lieutenant in June 1915, being appointed to the 15th Battalion, Middlesex Regiment. He was invalided out of active service in October 1915, but recovered to re-enlist as a non-commissioned officer in the 7th Battalion, Seaforth Highlanders where he held the rank of lance corporal. Rogers was killed in action near Le Transloy during the Battle of the Somme on 12 October 1916. He was commemorated at the Thiepval Memorial.
