= George Rogers House (Portsmouth, New Hampshire) =

Historic house in New Hampshire, United States

- U.S. National Register of Historic Places
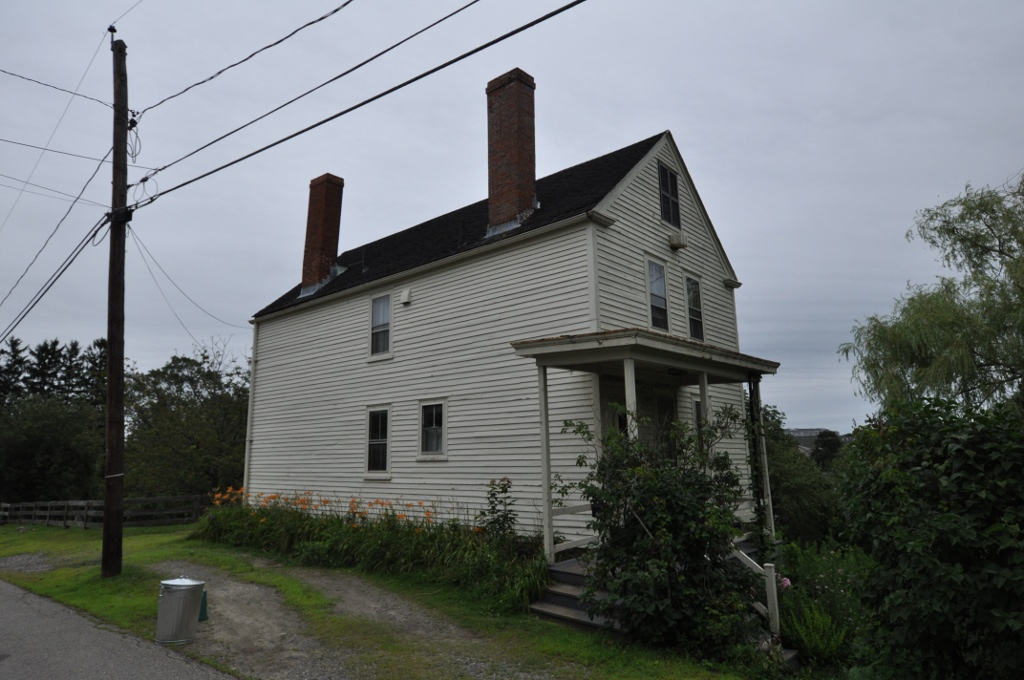

- Location within New Hampshire Location within the United States
- Location: 76 Northwest Street, Portsmouth, New Hampshire
- Coordinates: 43°4′53″N 70°46′0″W
- Area: 1.2 acres (0.49 ha)
- Built: 1839
- NRHP reference No.: 76000132
- Added to NRHP: June 7, 1976

The George Rogers House is a historic house at 76 Northwest Street in Portsmouth, New Hampshire. Probably built about 1839, it was home to a prominent local brickmaker, and forms a significant part of the landscape around the adjacent Richard Jackson House (c. 1690, now a National Historic Landmark). The house was listed on the National Register of Historic Places in 1976. Although it is owned by Historic New England, it is not open to the public, unlike the Jackson house, also owned by Historic New England.

== Description and history ==
The George Rogers House is located in what is now a residential enclave on the north side of Portsmouth's North Mill Pond, bounded by Maplewood Avenue and the U.S. Route 1 Bypass. It is set on the south side of Northwest Street, just east of the Richard Jackson House, and faces south toward a small orchard and the former mill pond, with its back to the street. It is a 2 1/2-story wood-frame structure, with a gabled roof and clapboarded exterior. It is five bays wide and two deep, and is set on a brick foundation, with brick chimneys. The main entrance has simple molding, but is framed by pilasters and an entablature.

The two-story wood-frame house was built by George Rogers, on land originally subdivided by Nathaniel Jackson, owner of the Jackson House at the time. Rogers, a native of Eliot, Maine, operated a brickyard on the land he purchased from Jackson. There is some evidence that the brick used in this house, including some used as nogging, came from the Rogers brickyard, which began operations in 1839. The Society for the Preservation of New England Antiquities (now Historic New England) purchased the Jackson house in 1924, whose parcel was less than an acre in size. It acquired the Rogers house in 1959 to enlarge its holdings around the Jackson house and protect its setting.

== See also ==
- National Register of Historic Places listings in Rockingham County, New Hampshire
