= James Rogers House (Belleview, Kentucky) =

Historic house in Kentucky, United States

- U.S. National Register of Historic Places
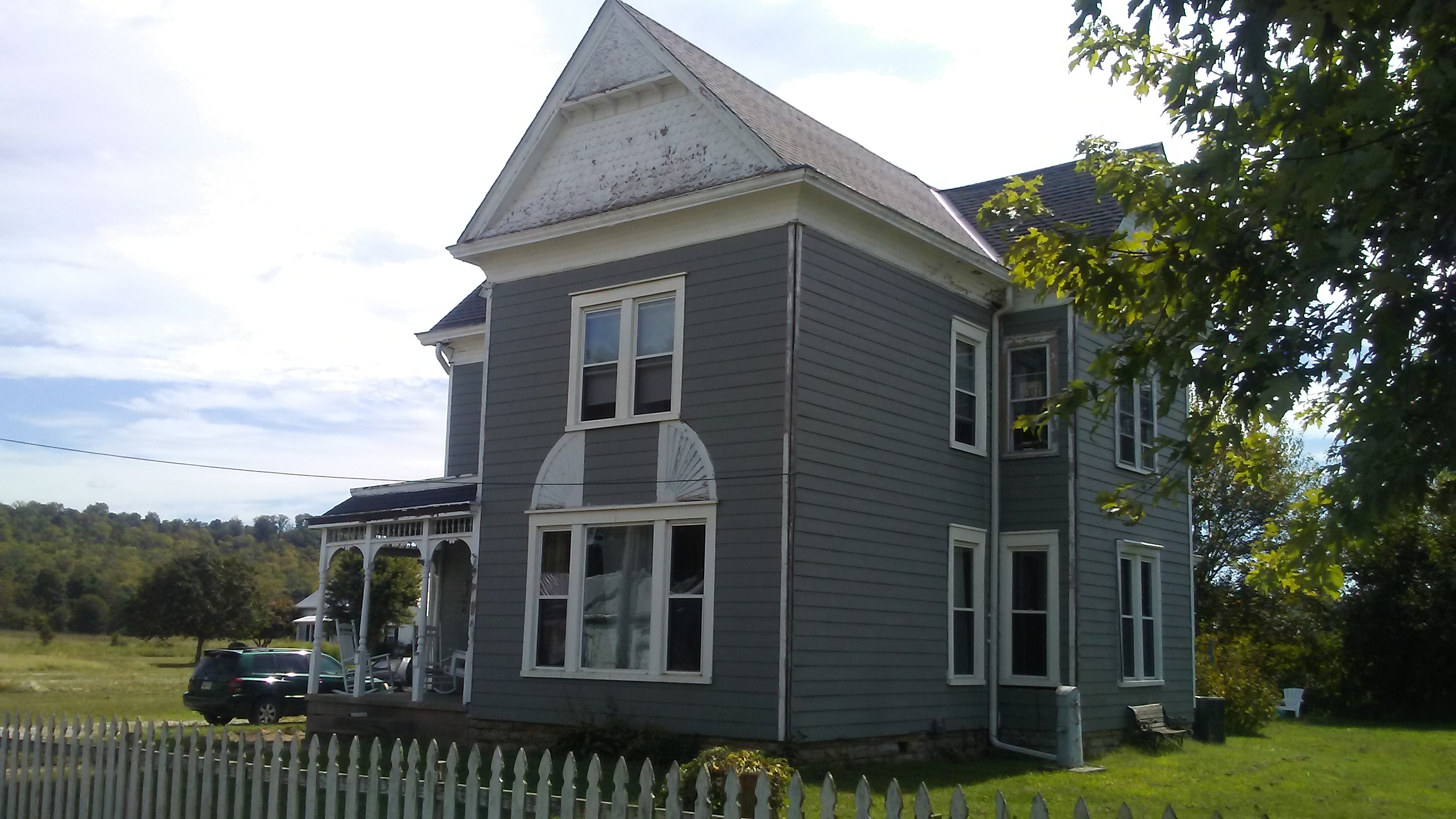

- Location within Kentucky Location within the United States
- Location: 6259 Sycamore St. Belleview, Kentucky
- Coordinates: 38°59′7″N 84°49′30″W
- Built: 1903
- Built by: John Presser, Et al.
- Architectural style: Queen Anne
- MPS: Boone County MRA
- NRHP reference No.: 88003295
- Added to NRHP: February 6, 1989

James Rogers House in Belleview, Kentucky is a Queen Anne-style farmhouse built in 1903. It was listed on the National Register of Historic Places in 1989.

It is a modified T-form frame house with three cross-gables. It was built by carpenters John Presser and Henry Griffith and stonemason Timothy Hogan. It was one of six Queen Anne style buildings identified in Boone County in a survey. A smokehouse and a livestock barn on the property are also contributing buildings.
