= George Rogers House (Lake Oswego, Oregon) =

- U.S. National Register of Historic Places
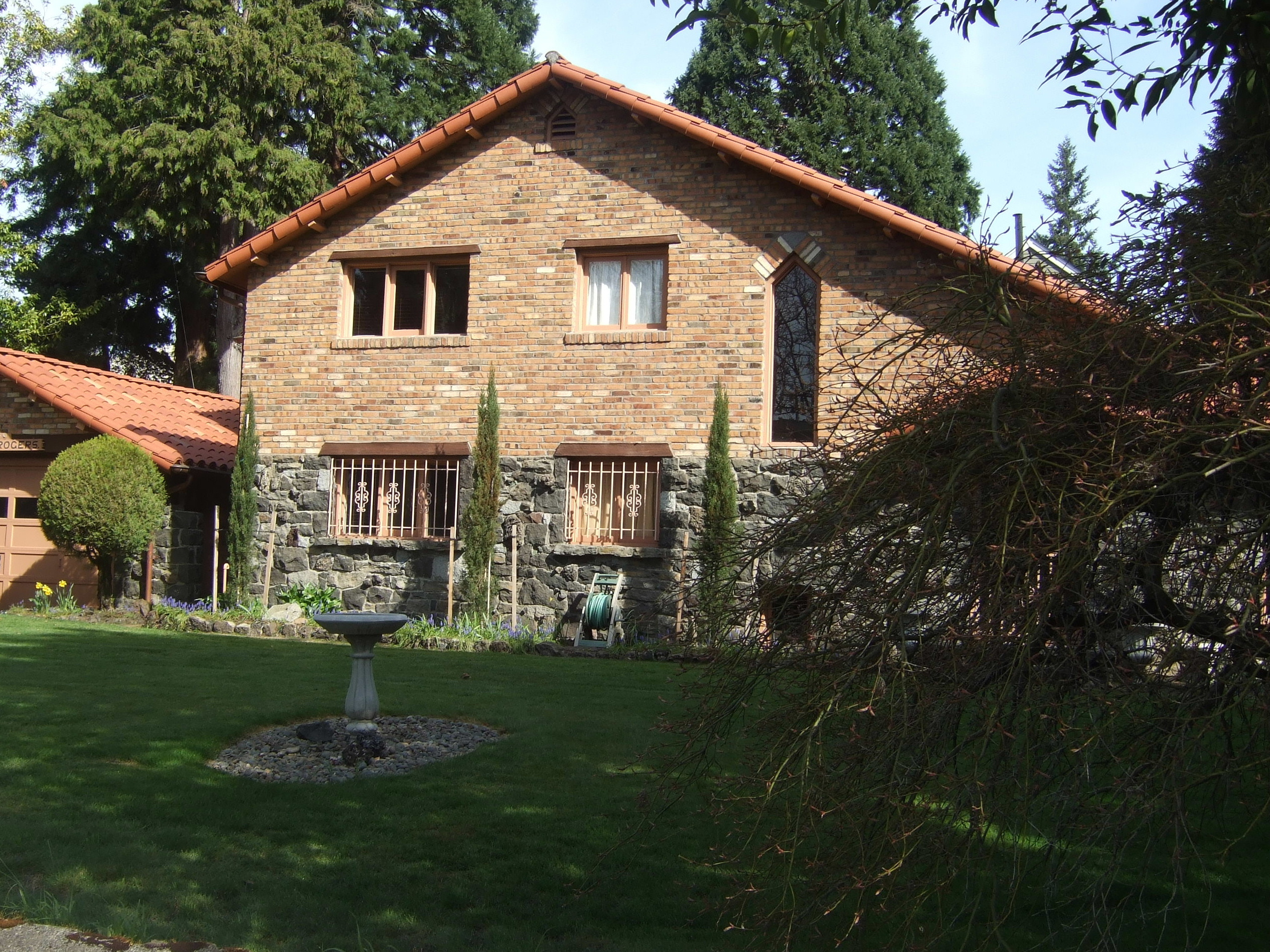
- Location: Lake Oswego, Oregon, USA
- Coordinates: 45.41315°N 122.66292°W
- Built: 1929
- Architect: James Van Evera Bailey
- Architectural style: Craftsman
- NRHP reference No.: 96001068
- Added to NRHP: October 3, 1996

George Rogers House is a private home in Lake Oswego, Oregon, United States. Located at the corner of Durham Street and Wilbur Street, the house was the home of George Rogers, who donated the land to the City of Lake Oswego that became George Rogers Park. During the time that Lake Oswego was an industrial town, the park was the location of Lake Oswego's China Town district. Built in 1929, the two-story craftsman house was added to the United States National Register of Historic Places listings in 1996.
