= James Mitchell Rogers House =

Historic house in North Carolina, United States

- U.S. National Register of Historic Places
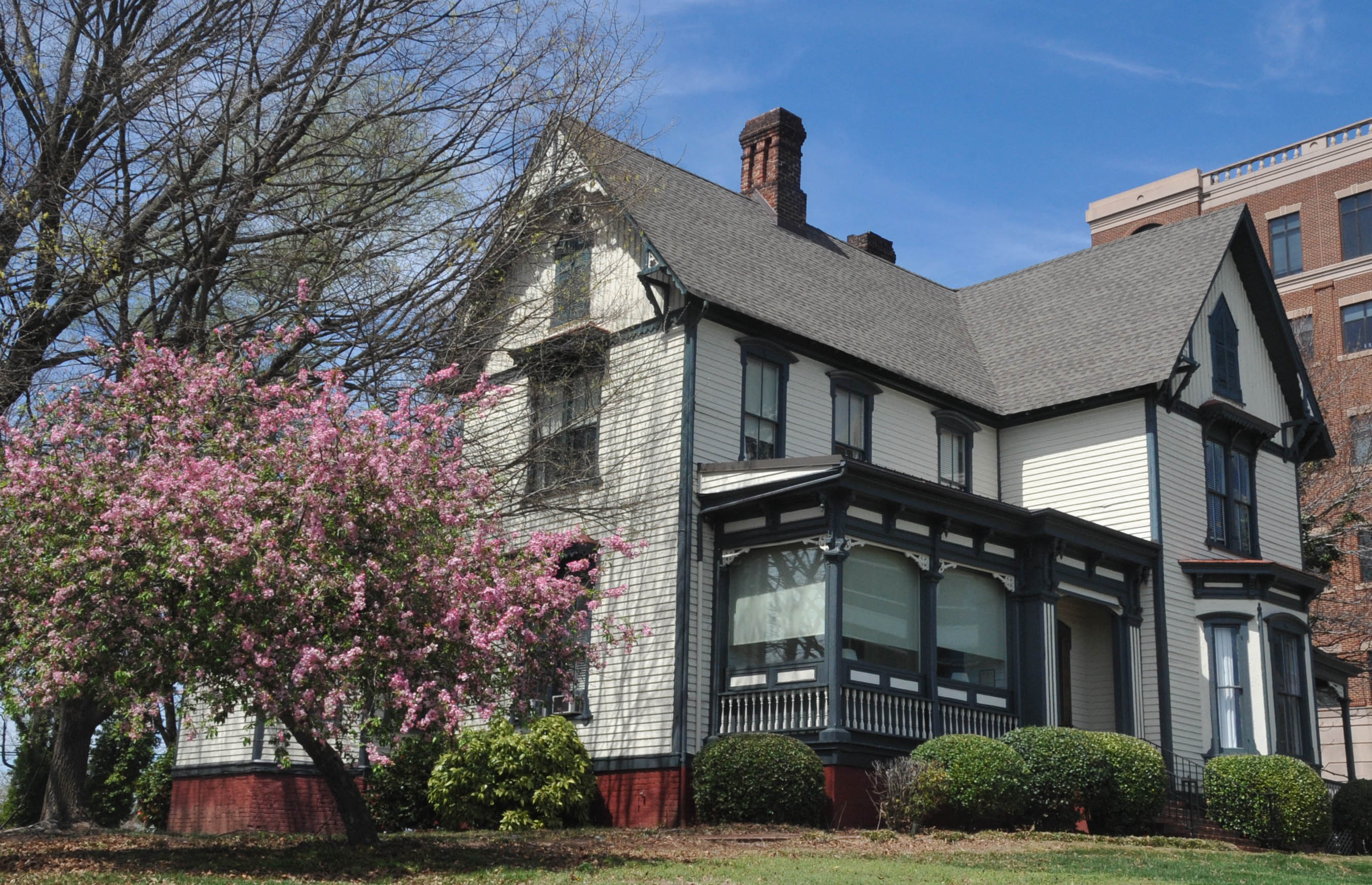
- James Mitchell Rogers House, September 2007

- Location within North Carolina Location within the United States
- Location: 102 S. Cherry St., Winston-Salem, North Carolina
- Coordinates: 36°5′38″N 80°14′50″W
- Area: less than one acre
- Built: 1883-1885
- Built by: Miller Brothers
- Architectural style: Late Gothic Revival, Italianate, Queen Anne
- NRHP reference No.: 82003453
- Added to NRHP: July 15, 1982

James Mitchell Rogers House is a historic home located at Winston-Salem, Forsyth County, North Carolina. It was built between 1883 and 1885, and is a large two-story, eclectic Late Victorian frame dwelling. The house design reflects Late Gothic Revival, Italianate, and Queen Anne style design influences. It features steeply pitched gables sheathed in board and batten siding, bay windows, and irregular massing. It was the home of James Mitchell Rogers, a prominent Winston-Salem businessman, and his son, Francis Mitchell Rogers, chief chemist of Standard Oil Company of Indiana.

It was listed on the National Register of Historic Places in 1982.
