= John Rogers House (West Windsor, New Jersey) =

Historic house in New Jersey, United States

- U.S. National Register of Historic Places
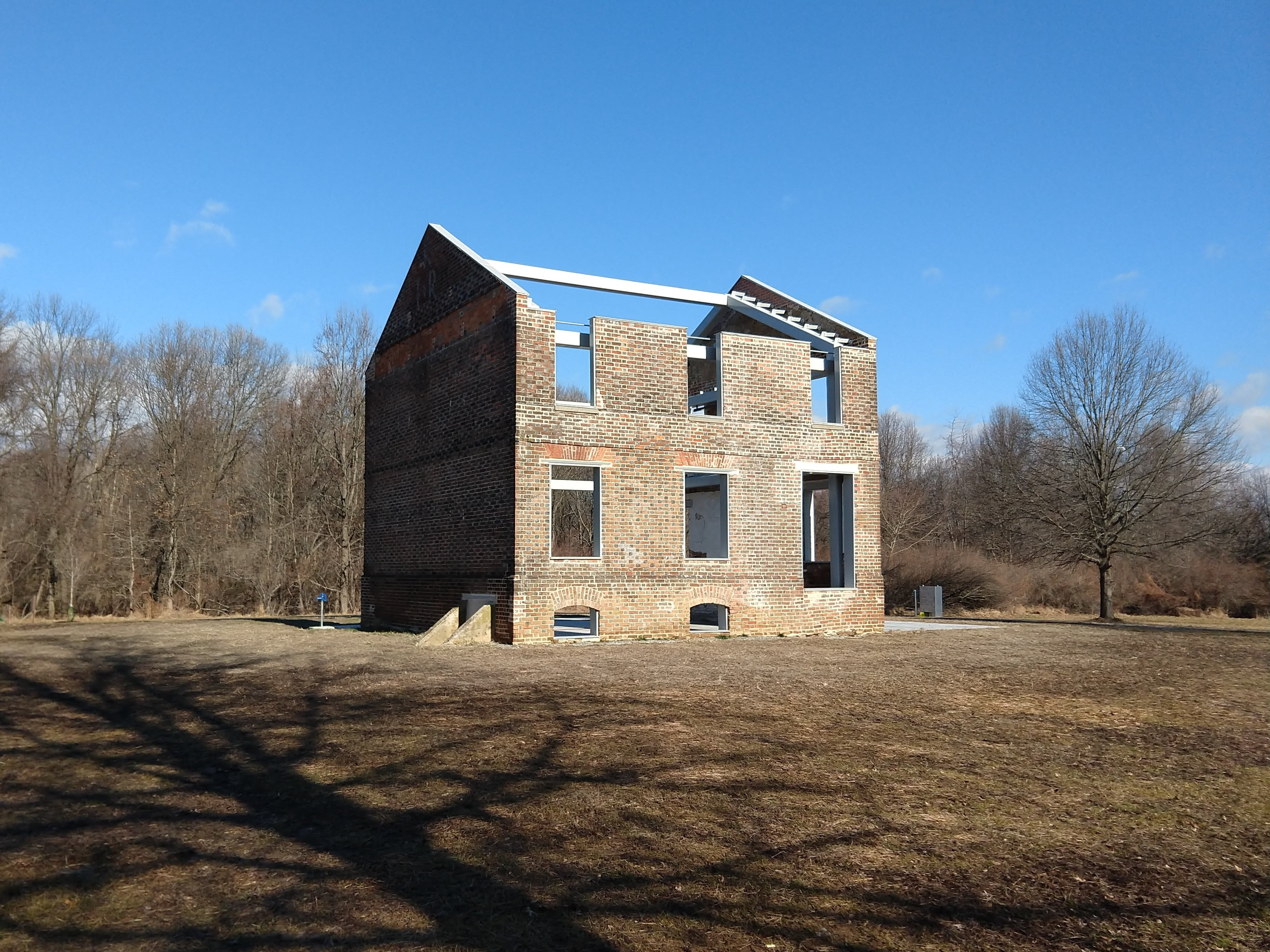
- Front of house in January 2020

- Location within Mercer County, New Jersey Location within New Jersey Location within the United States
- Nearest city: Princeton, New Jersey
- Coordinates: 40°15′44.69″N 74°38′52.34″W
- Built: 1761
- NRHP reference No.: 78001770
- Added to NRHP: January 31, 1978

The John Rogers House, built in 1761, is a historic home believed to be one of the oldest existing structures in West Windsor Township, New Jersey. The building was added to the National Register of Historic Places on January 31, 1978.

The home has been listed by Preservation New Jersey on its list of endangered historic sites, as the local and county historical societies disagree about the preservation of the building. The structure was deeded to Mercer County in 1970 when the lands around the house became Mercer County Park. The building was not maintained since it became part of the park; tarps were placed over the roof to protect it from weather. Between 2017 and 2019, the roof of the building was removed and its walls were preserved to create a "constructed ruin" interpretive center.

== See also ==
- National Register of Historic Places listings in Mercer County, New Jersey
