= Basil Rogers =

English cricketer

Personal information
- Full name: Basil Leonard Rogers
- Born: 20 June 1896; Bedford, Bedfordshire, England
- Died: 9 October 1975 (aged 79); Pateley Bridge, Yorkshire, England
- Batting: Right-handed

Domestic team information
- Years: Team
- 1925–1935: Oxfordshire
- 1923: Glamorgan
- 1911–1924: Bedfordshire

Career statistics
Competition	First-class
Matches	2
Runs scored	46
Batting average	15.33
100s/50s	–/–
Top score	16*
Balls bowled	60
Wickets	1
Bowling average	33.00
5 wickets in innings	–
10 wickets in match	–
Best bowling	1/22
Catches/stumpings	–/–
- Source: Cricinfo, 29 May 2011

Basil Leonard Rogers (20 June 1896 – 9 October 1975) was an English cricketer. Rogers was a right-handed batsman. Born in Bedford, Bedfordshire, he was the son of Richard Rogers and Julia Marsh. His father was head groundsman at Bedford Modern School, there is also an indication that he played for Bedfordshire or Oxfordshire, before either had a county cricket club. (Note: A cricketer with the surname Rogers played for Bedfordshire from 1891–1894, although further details about him are not known.) (Note: His father was born in Cowley, Oxfordshire. An R.Rogers appeared for Oxfordshire in 1881.) His family was large and he had 8 other siblings. He was educated in his hometown at Bedford Modern School, where he played for the school cricket team.

Rogers made his debut for Bedfordshire in the 1911 Minor Counties Championship against Hertfordshire. He continued to play Minor counties cricket for Bedfordshire after the First World War, appearing for the county until 1924.

1923 saw Rogers make his debut in first-class cricket for Glamorgan against Northamptonshire in the County Championship. On debut, Rogers scored 4 runs in the Glamorgan first-innings, before being dismissed by Albert Thomas, while in the second-innings he scored an unbeaten 16. He bowled 5 overs in the match, without taking a wicket. He played a further first-class match in 1923, against Lancashire. In this match, he scored 12 runs in Glamorgan's first-innings, before being dismissed by Lawrence Cook, while in the second-innings he was run out for 14. With the ball, Rogers claimed his only first-class wicket, that of Lancashire captain Jack Sharp.

Rogers only played 2 first-class matches for Glamorgan, and upon leaving Bedfordshire at the end of the 1924 season, he joined Oxfordshire, for whom he played Minor counties cricket for sporadically between 1925 and 1935. At some point during his life, he married a woman called Nellie Wilson. Rogers died at Pateley Bridge, Yorkshire on 9 October 1975. His death was not afforded an entry in the 1976 Wisden Cricketers' Almanack.
