= John Rogers House (Branford, Connecticut) =

Historic house in Connecticut, United States

- U.S. National Register of Historic Places
- U.S. Historic district – Contributing property
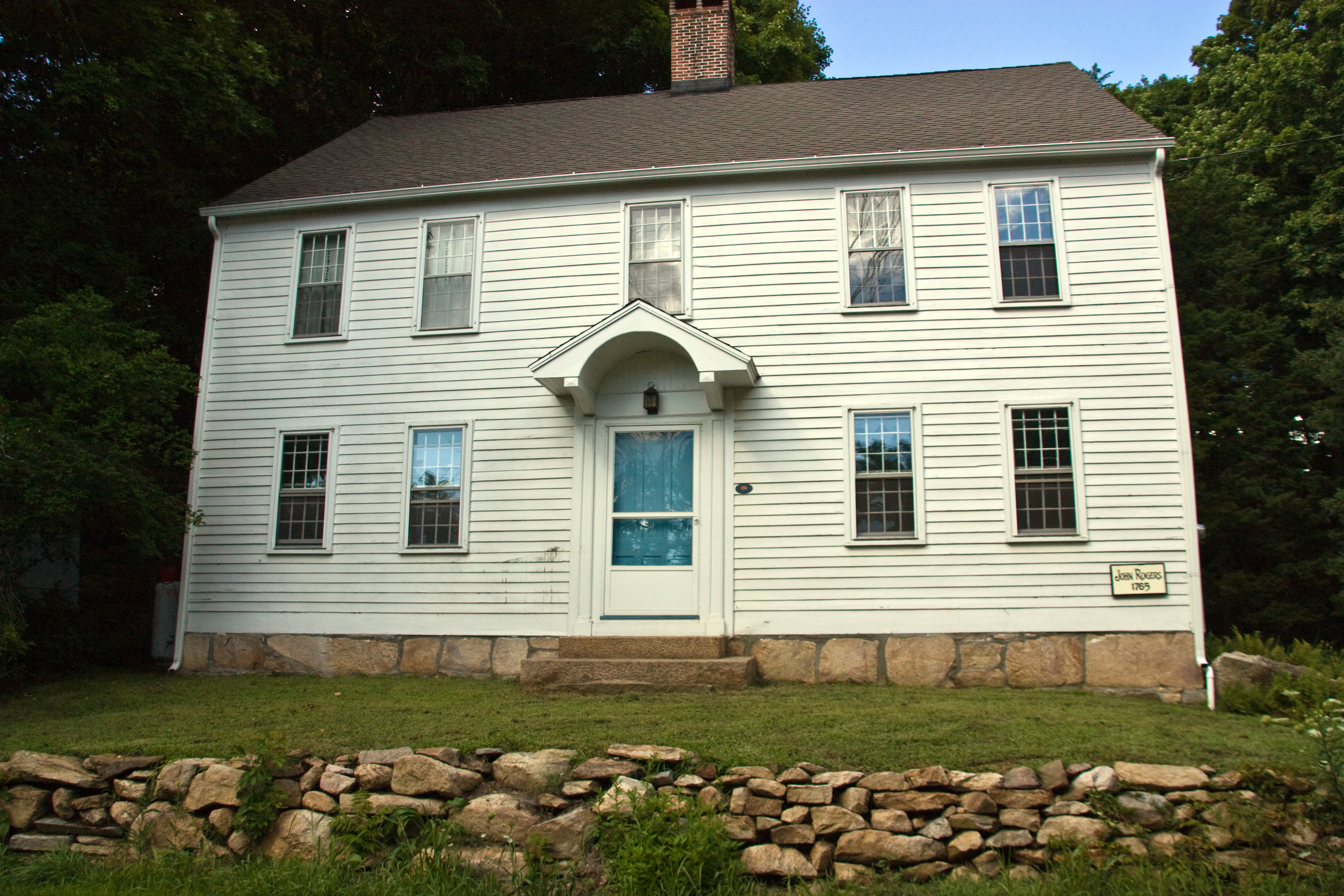
- John Rogers House in 2008

- Location within Connecticut Location within the United States
- Location: 690 Leete's Island Road, Branford, Connecticut
- Coordinates: 41°16′12″N 72°44′14″W
- Area: 0.5 acres (0.20 ha)
- Built: 1750
- Architectural style: Colonial, New England Colonial
- Part of: Route 146 Historic District (ID90000569)
- MPS: Colonial Houses of Branford TR
- NRHP reference No.: 88002642

Significant dates
- Added to NRHP: December 1, 1988
- Designated CP: April 5, 1990

The John Rogers House is a historic house at 690 Leete's Island Road in Branford, Connecticut, United States. It is a 2 1/2-story wood-frame structure, five bays wide, with a side-gable roof, a large central chimney, and a center entry sheltered by a bracketed hood. Long thought to have been built c. 1810, it has been carefully researched to date to the middle 18th century, belonging for many years to the locally prominent Rogers family. The John Rogers House was listed on the National Register of Historic Places in 1988. Portions of the content on this web page were adapted from a copy of the original Connecticut Historical Commission, Historic Resources Inventory documentation.

== Description ==
The John Rogers House, located at 690 Leetes Island Road in the Route 146 Historic District, was constructed on a rectangular plan with its ridge parallel to the street. The house has a steeply pitched roof with minimal overhang at the cornice. Small dentil, moldings are featured below the cornice. Its brick center chimney straddles the ridge. It has a nine-window facade and a five-window gable. Windows have twelve-over-twelve sash except the attic window which has six-over-six sash. Its entry door is protected by a gabled hood with an arched ceiling, supported on large curvilinear brackets.

In addition to the house, there is a 1 ½ - story three-bay eave-entry bank barn. The ridge line of the barn runs north–south while its south gable-end faces Leetes Island Road that runs at an angle from the southwest to the northeast. The three-bay west eave-side of the barn is the main façade with the main entrance in the first bay from the north through a hinged pass-through door. The original entrance to the barn appears to be through a double-height wagon door entrance spanning the entire length of the first bay from the north as evident from the markings on the siding. The grade level along the west eave-façade of the barn gradually declines towards the south revealing the un-coursed mortared field stone masonry of the bank level. The low grade level along the main façade wraps the barn around the south gable-end to form the bank level which has two open bays. The gable attic lined by fascia board is separated from the rest of the gable-end by a distinct dropped girt siding divide line. The grade level along the three-bay east eave-side of the barn gradually rises towards the north along the un-coursed un-mortared field stone masonry of the bank. The east eave-side of the barn has an entrance off-centered towards the north through a hinged pass-through door and appears to have originally at least two window openings towards the south as suggested by the markings on the siding. The north gable-end of the barn has two six-pane windows with trim at the first-floor level. The gable attic lined by fascia board is separated from the rest of the gable-end by a distinct dropped girt siding divide line.

== Historical significance ==
The John Rogers House was recorded on the WPA survey and dated 1810-15 by Elmer D. Keith. However, a well-researched and documented account of the house by David and Ann Clark puts the date of construction between 1750 and 1760. The house has had a marker on it for many years dating it 1765, but there does not appear to be any evidence to support this date.

The John Rogers House, a well-preserved and researched New England Colonial house, provides a significant architectural record of rural life in this eastern section of Branford in the mid-eighteenth century. It is historically significant for its association with the Rogers family, a family whose history in Branford goes back to the earliest period of settlement. It is a well-documented example in Branford's collection of colonial houses.

== See also ==
- National Register of Historic Places listings in New Haven County, Connecticut
