= National Register of Historic Places listings in Boone County, Kentucky =

Location of Boone County in Kentucky

This is a list of the National Register of Historic Places listings in Boone County, Kentucky.

This is intended to be a complete list of the properties and districts on the National Register of Historic Places in Boone County, Kentucky, United States. The locations of National Register properties and districts for which the latitude and longitude coordinates are included below, may be seen in a map.

There are 107 properties and districts listed on the National Register in the county, one of which is also a National Historic Landmark.

This National Park Service list is complete through NPS recent listings posted December 19, 2025.

== Current listings ==
	Name on the Register	Image	Date listed	Location	City or town	Description
1	B. M. Allen House		February 6, 1989 (#88003290)	11301 Riddles Run Rd. 38°54′52″N 84°48′00″W	Union	
2	Anderson Ferry	Anderson Ferry	June 10, 1982 (#82003575)	39°04′35″N 84°37′28″W	Constance	
3	Archaeological Site 15 BE 36		August 18, 1983 (#83002555)	Address Restricted	Union	
4	A. J. Aylor House	A. J. Aylor House	February 6, 1989 (#88003275)	2162 Petersburg Rd. 39°04′00″N 84°42′34″W	Hebron	
5	Donald Barger House	Donald Barger House	February 6, 1989 (#88003259)	2972 Front St. 39°04′14″N 84°52′02″W	Petersburg	
6	Bedinger Site		March 24, 2000 (#00000276)	Address Restricted	Walton	
7	Belleview Baptist Church	Belleview Baptist Church	February 6, 1989 (#88003248)	6658 5th St. 38°59′09″N 84°49′35″W	Belleview	
8	Belleview Post Office	Belleview Post Office	June 14, 1990 (#88003250)	6256 Main St. 38°59′09″N 84°49′35″W	Belleview	
9	Big Bone Lick Archeological District		August 22, 2002 (#00000284)	Along Big Bone Creek; 38°52′58″N 84°44′59″W	Union	
10	Big Bone Lick State Park	Big Bone Lick State Park	June 13, 1972 (#72001585)	Route 1; 38°53′10″N 84°45′15″W	Union	Designated a National Historic Landmark in 2024.
11	Big Bone Methodist Church	Big Bone Methodist Church	February 6, 1989 (#88003287)	3435 Beaver Rd. 38°53′19″N 84°45′04″W	Union	
12	Blankenbecker-Riley Farm		December 3, 2002 (#00000907)	2788 Hathaway Rd. 38°57′11″N 84°42′49″W	Union	
13	Clinton Blankenbeker House	Clinton Blankenbeker House	February 6, 1989 (#88003302)	7414 U.S. Route 42; 38°59′48″N 84°37′53″W	Florence	
14	Nicholas S. and Gertrude E. Blau House	Nicholas S. and Gertrude E. Blau House	November 25, 2005 (#05001305)	15 Alta Vista Ave. 38°52′00″N 84°36′48″W	Walton	
15	Boone County Distillery Superintendent's House and Guest House	Boone County Distillery Superintendent's House and Guest House	February 6, 1989 (#88003256)	3073 Front St. 39°04′10″N 84°52′15″W	Petersburg	
16	Botts House	Botts House	February 6, 1989 (#88003269)	4752 Petersburg Rd. 39°04′37″N 84°48′13″W	Burlington	
17	Burlington Historic District	Burlington Historic District	June 19, 1979 (#79000961)	Kentucky Route 18; also portions of Washington, Gallative, Perlate, Temperate, Garrard, Jefferson, and Ohio Sts., Nicholas Ave., and Union Sq. 39°01′43″N 84°43′27″W	Burlington	Boundaries reflect a boundary change of August 3, 2005 (#04000797)
18	B. C. Calvert House		February 6, 1989 (#88003292)	10246 Lower River Rd. 38°56′26″N 84°50′47″W	Union	
19	Jonathan Carlton House	Jonathan Carlton House	November 10, 1982 (#82001551)	Market St. 39°04′11″N 84°52′03″W	Petersburg	
20	Robert Chamber House		August 24, 2000 (#00000906)	118 Chambers Rd. 38°53′22″N 84°36′34″W	Walton	
21	A. E. Chambers Octagonal Barn		February 7, 1989 (#88003268)	5009 Petersburg Rd. 39°04′08″N 84°48′51″W	Petersburg	
22	C. Scott Chambers House and Funeral Parlor	C. Scott Chambers House and Funeral Parlor	August 24, 2000 (#00000911)	111 N. Main St. 38°52′15″N 84°36′50″W	Walton	
23	Robert Chambers House		October 10, 1975 (#75000733)	301 E. Bend Rd. 39°01′12″N 84°43′30″W	Burlington	
24	Chandler House	Chandler House	February 6, 1989 (#88003305)	167 S. Main St. 38°51′19″N 84°36′20″W	Walton	
25	Christian Meeting House	Christian Meeting House	February 6, 1989 (#88003262)	6561 Tanner St. 39°04′07″N 84°52′06″W	Petersburg	
26	Clore House	Clore House	February 6, 1989 (#88003252)	6001 Burlington Pike; 38°59′37″N 84°49′27″W	Belleview	
27	Jonas Clore House	Jonas Clore House	February 6, 1989 (#88003249)	6256 Main St. 38°59′09″N 84°49′35″W	Belleview	
28	Jonas Clore Log House		August 24, 2000 (#00000910)	9293 E. Bend Rd. 38°57′53″N 84°48′03″W	Burlington	
29	Code House		November 25, 2005 (#05001306)	965 Beaver Rd. 38°52′28″N 84°38′59″W	Walton	
30	Capt. N. Collins House District		February 6, 1989 (#88003253)	6255 Aurora Ferry Rd. 39°03′15″N 84°53′22″W	Petersburg	
31	Allie Corn House		February 6, 1989 (#88003271)	2807 Graves Rd. 39°04′34″N 84°44′16″W	Hebron	
32	Crisler-Crisler Mounds Site		April 11, 2002 (#02000341)	Address Restricted	Hebron	
33	Dr. M. J. Crouch House		February 6, 1989 (#88003307)	2063 Hathaway Rd. 38°56′38″N 84°41′06″W	Union	
34	John Delehunty House	John Delehunty House	February 6, 1989 (#88003300)	212 Main St. 39°00′14″N 84°37′24″W	Florence	Tudor Revival style house, apparently demolished.
35	Sam Delph House		February 6, 1989 (#88003270)	4633 Garrison Creek Rd. 39°05′45″N 84°47′47″W	Petersburg	
36	W. T. Delph House		February 6, 1989 (#88003277)	6180 Rogers Ln. 39°01′25″N 84°43′11″W	Burlington	
37	Daniel Dew House	Daniel Dew House	February 6, 1989 (#88003264)	2950 3rd St. 39°04′08″N 84°51′53″W	Petersburg	
38	Dinsmore House	Dinsmore House	March 28, 1979 (#79000962)	West of Burlington on Kentucky Route 18; also 5655 Burlington Pike; 39°00′03″N 84°48′49″W	Burlington	A boundary increase was approved November 13, 2023.
39	Early House	Early House	February 6, 1989 (#88003297)	2970 1st St. 39°04′11″N 84°51′59″W	Petersburg	
40	East Bend Church	East Bend Church	February 6, 1989 (#88003291)	12341 Lower River Rd. 38°55′09″N 84°51′31″W	Union	
41	Edwards House	Edwards House	February 7, 1989 (#88003304)	143 S. Main St. 38°51′23″N 84°36′27″W	Walton	
42	Farmers Bank of Petersburg	Farmers Bank of Petersburg	February 6, 1989 (#88003261)	3010 1st St. 39°04′09″N 84°52′05″W	Petersburg	
43	Flick House	Flick House	February 6, 1989 (#88003251)	6282 Burlington Pike; 38°59′13″N 84°49′38″W	Belleview	
44	Florence Fire Station	Florence Fire Station	February 6, 1989 (#88003301)	Main St. 39°00′03″N 84°37′37″W	Florence	
45	Florence Hotel	Florence Hotel	February 6, 1989 (#88003280)	262 Main St. 39°00′06″N 84°37′37″W	Florence	
46	Benjamin Piatt Fowler House		October 29, 1982 (#82001552)	North of Union on U.S. Route 42; 38°57′36″N 84°40′54″W	Union	
47	Benjamin R. Gaines Farm		February 6, 1989 (#88003299)	3895 Idlewild Rd. 39°03′31″N 84°46′51″W	Burlington	
48	Col. Abner Gaines House	Col. Abner Gaines House	April 10, 1980 (#80001483)	North of Walton at 84 Old Lexington Pike; 38°53′03″N 84°36′30″W	Walton	Boundaries increased on February 4, 2010, but details of increase not provided
49	George-Vest House	George-Vest House	August 24, 2000 (#00000913)	13815 Walton-Verona Rd. 38°50′34″N 84°38′25″W	Verona	
50	William Milburn Glore House	William Milburn Glore House	December 3, 2002 (#00000904)	11682 Big Bone-Union Rd. 38°53′56″N 84°44′08″W	Union	
51	Virginia Corey Goodridge House	Virginia Corey Goodridge House	August 24, 2000 (#00000902)	259 Main St. 39°00′05″N 84°37′36″W	Florence	
52	Gordon's Hall	Gordon's Hall	February 6, 1989 (#88003260)	6561 Market St. 39°04′09″N 84°52′04″W	Petersburg	
53	M. B. Green Site		March 26, 2008 (#08000208)	Address Restricted	Petersburg	
54	Peter Gregory House		August 24, 2000 (#00000905)	5063 Beaver Rd. 38°54′06″N 84°48′13″W	Union	
55	Hamilton School		February 6, 1989 (#88003308)	4837 Beaver Rd. 38°54′04″N 84°47′46″W	Union	
56	Hebron Deposit Bank	Hebron Deposit Bank	February 6, 1989 (#88003274)	1871 Petersburg Rd. 39°03′56″N 84°41′52″W	Hebron	
57	Harvey A. Hicks House		February 6, 1989 (#88003281)	1325 Hicks Pike; 38°54′38″N 84°39′43″W	Walton	Demolished
58	Samuel Hind House	Samuel Hind House	June 14, 1990 (#88003278)	417 Stephenson Mill Rd. 38°51′17″N 84°38′04″W	Walton	
59	Hopeful Lutheran Church	Hopeful Lutheran Church	February 6, 1989 (#88003279)	6431 Hopeful Rd. 38°59′59″N 84°39′33″W	Florence	
60	Agnes Horton House	Agnes Horton House	February 6, 1989 (#88003263)	2901 2nd St. 39°04′14″N 84°51′48″W	Petersburg	
61	Hudson House	Hudson House	February 6, 1989 (#88003283)	12328 Gaines Way; 38°52′55″N 84°37′55″W	Walton	
62	D. W. Huey House	D. W. Huey House	February 6, 1989 (#88003294)	7812 East Bend Rd. 38°58′40″N 84°44′20″W	Burlington	
63	Thomas Huey Farm		August 24, 2000 (#00000900)	10492 Big Bone Rd. 38°55′44″N 84°43′20″W	Union	
64	Hughes House		February 6, 1989 (#88003282)	771 Chambers Rd. 38°53′38″N 84°38′43″W	Walton	
65	Jenkins-Berkshire House	Jenkins-Berkshire House	August 24, 2000 (#00000908)	6529 Mill St. 39°03′59″N 84°52′18″W	Petersburg	
66	Cave Johnson House		February 6, 1989 (#88003273)	8368 River Rd. 39°08′23″N 84°44′23″W	Hebron	
67	Kirtley House		February 9, 1989 (#89000013)	2451 Second Creek Rd. 39°04′44″N 84°49′46″W	Petersburg	
68	Rev. Robert E. Kirtley House		February 6, 1989 (#88003272)	8545 River Rd. 39°07′52″N 84°44′54″W	Hebron	
69	James William Kite Store	James William Kite Store	July 30, 2014 (#14000456)	8800 E. Bend Rd. 38°58′21″N 84°47′23″W	Burlington	
70	Morris Lassing House	Morris Lassing House	June 14, 1990 (#88003285)	10515 U.S. Route 42; 38°55′40″N 84°40′37″W	Union	
71	Loder House	Loder House	February 6, 1989 (#88003257)	3028 Front St. 39°04′10″N 84°52′08″W	Petersburg	
72	Maplewood		March 24, 2000 (#00000275)	Address Restricted	Walton	
73	John Clifton and Ann Catherine Mayhugh House	John Clifton and Ann Catherine Mayhugh House	November 25, 2005 (#05001309)	133 N. Main St. 38°52′20″N 84°36′47″W	Walton	
74	John Clifton Mayhugh House	John Clifton Mayhugh House	February 6, 1989 (#88003303)	113 N. Main St. 38°52′15″N 84°36′50″W	Walton	
75	W. F. and Florence McKim House		November 25, 2005 (#05001310)	6031 S. Orient St. 39°01′33″N 84°43′17″W	Burlington	No longer extant.
76	Frank S. Milburn Machine Shop		November 25, 2005 (#05001311)	5844 N. Orient St. 39°02′00″N 84°43′13″W	Burlington	
77	M. Miller House		February 6, 1989 (#88003289)	3805 Beaver Rd. 38°53′25″N 84°45′56″W	Union	
78	John Moore House		March 29, 1978 (#78001300)	6 miles (9.6 km) northwest of Francisville; 39°06′55″N 84°46′35″W	Francisville	
79	L. C. Norman House		February 6, 1989 (#88003286)	1966 Mt. Zion Rd. 38°56′46″N 84°40′48″W	Union	
80	Richard Parker House		February 6, 1989 (#88003296)	4312 Belleview Rd. 39°02′16″N 84°51′50″W	Petersburg	
81	Peters House	Peters House	February 6, 1989 (#88003298)	2973 3rd St. 39°04′06″N 84°51′50″W	Petersburg	
82	Piatt's Landing	Piatt's Landing	July 18, 1974 (#74000849)	South of Burlington off Kentucky Route 338; 38°54′05″N 84°51′33″W	Burlington	
83	Prospect Farm	Prospect Farm	February 6, 1989 (#88003265)	6279 Petersburg Rd. 39°03′47″N 84°51′47″W	Petersburg	
84	Rabbit Hash General Store	Rabbit Hash General Store	February 6, 1989 (#88003293)	10021 Lower River Rd. 38°56′32″N 84°50′46″W	Rabbit Hash	Severely damaged by fire February 2016
85	Rabbit Hash Historic District	Rabbit Hash Historic District	December 4, 2003 (#03001231)	10021-10410 Lower River Rd. 38°56′29″N 84°51′02″W	Rabbit Hash	
86	Ransom House		February 6, 1989 (#88003284)	1842 Messmer Rd. 38°48′28″N 84°38′51″W	Crittenden	
87	Reeves Mound		August 3, 1990 (#90001154)	Address Restricted	Stringtown	
88	Thomas Zane Roberts House and Workshop		February 28, 2012 (#12000042)	5074 Middle Creek Rd. 38°59′37″N 84°47′21″W	Burlington	
89	Rogers Site		October 31, 1983 (#83003647)	Address Restricted	Petersburg	
90	Boone Fowler Rogers Barn		August 24, 2000 (#00000901)	5394 Belleview Rd. 39°01′01″N 84°49′49″W	Petersburg	
91	James Rogers House	James Rogers House	February 6, 1989 (#88003295)	6259 Sycamore St. 38°59′07″N 84°49′30″W	Belleview	
92	Henry and Agnes Rolsen House		November 25, 2005 (#05001312)	3044 Dry Creek Rd. 39°04′24″N 84°38′21″W	Constance	
93	Dr. Gladys Rouse Office and House	Dr. Gladys Rouse Office and House	November 25, 2005 (#05001313)	221 Main St. 39°00′11″N 84°37′26″W	Florence	
94	Ryle's Super Market and Oddfellows Building	Ryle's Super Market and Oddfellows Building	February 6, 1989 (#88003258)	6571 Tanner St. 39°04′08″N 84°52′14″W	Petersburg	
95	South Main Street Historic District	South Main Street Historic District	March 17, 2005 (#04001249)	Roughly along Main St. between Edwards and Loreco Sts. 38°51′38″N 84°36′37″W	Walton	
96	Abe Souther House		January 8, 1987 (#87000143)	Off Kentucky Route 237; 39°05′55″N 84°42′27″W	Francisville	
97	J. Q. A. Stephens House		November 25, 2005 (#05001308)	5572 Rabbit Hash Rd. 38°56′14″N 84°48′13″W	Union	
98	Dr. John E. Stevenson House		August 24, 2000 (#00000912)	3422 Beaver Rd. 38°53′20″N 84°45′03″W	Union	
99	John Tanner House		January 8, 1987 (#87000207)	Kentucky Route 20; 39°03′54″N 84°51′52″W	Petersburg	
100	George W. Terrill House	George W. Terrill House	February 6, 1989 (#88003266)	6002 Petersburg Rd. 39°03′50″N 84°51′02″W	Petersburg	
101	John G. Tomlin House	John G. Tomlin House	November 25, 2005 (#05001314)	109 N. Main St. 38°52′14″N 84°36′50″W	Walton	
102	Ephraim Uitz House		June 14, 1990 (#88003276)	5208 Bullitssville Rd. 39°02′31″N 84°43′08″W	Burlington	
103	Verona High School	Verona High School	December 3, 2002 (#00000909)	14923 Walton-Verona Rd. 38°49′09″N 84°39′27″W	Verona	
104	Wallace House	Wallace House	February 6, 1989 (#88003306)	67 S. Main St. 38°51′41″N 84°36′38″W	Walton	
105	John J. Walton House		February 28, 2012 (#12000041)	5408 Belleview Rd. 39°00′36″N 84°50′01″W	Belleview	
106	Watts House		January 8, 1987 (#87000208)	Williams Rd. 39°05′49″N 84°45′03″W	Bullittsville	
107	Wingate-Gaines Farm District		February 7, 1989 (#88003267)	5225 Whitton Rd. 39°02′54″N 84°49′18″W	Petersburg	

== See also ==
- List of National Historic Landmarks in Kentucky
- National Register of Historic Places listings in Kentucky
