= East Bend (disambiguation) =

East Bend may refer to:

- East Bend, Kentucky, a region of Boone County
- East Bend, North Carolina, a town in Yadkin County
- East Bend Township, Champaign County, Illinois, a township in Champaign County
- East Bend Township, Yadkin County, North Carolina

== See also ==
- East Bend Church, a historic church in Union, Kentucky
- East Bend Generating Station, a coal-fired power plant near Rabbit Hash, Kentucky
