= East Bend, Kentucky =

Coordinates: 38.91°N 84.86°W

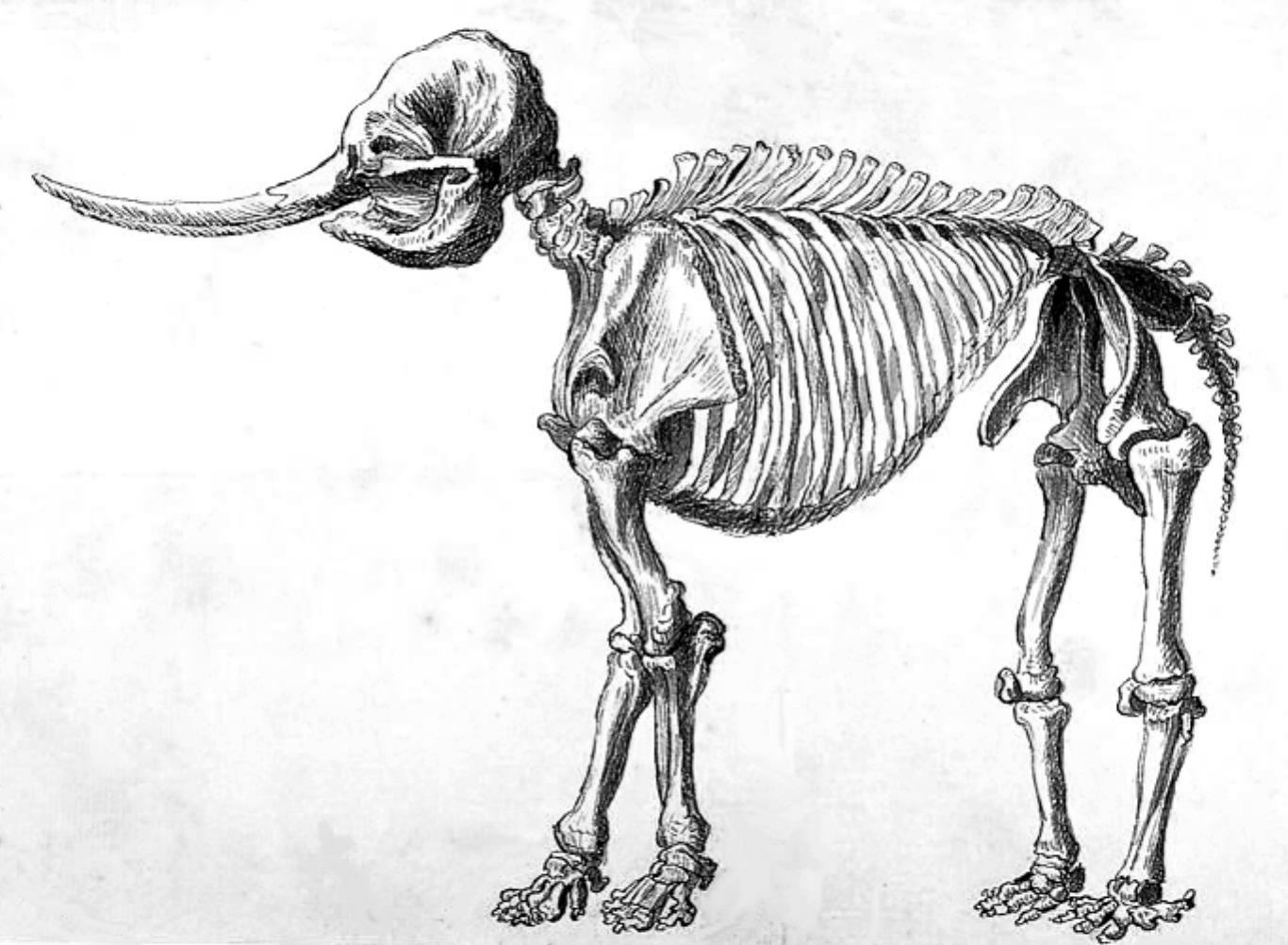
Drawing of a mastodon skeleton by Rembrandt Peale

East Bend is a region of Boone County, Kentucky, about 20 miles southwest of Cincinnati, Ohio. The region is well named; there the Ohio River turns left by more than a right angle, and flows east for ten miles or more. On the Kentucky side of the river, the land is mostly bottom land and good farm land. Points on interest are the river towns of Belleville, Mcville, Rabbit Hash, Piatt's Landing and Hamilton. There is a salt spring at Big Bone Lick where mastodon and buffalo bones have been found.

On the Indiana side, the southern edge of the Bedford Limestone forms high rocky hills. Indiana towns are Rising Sun and North Landing.

Early settler families were Piatt, McCoy, Canby, Pepper, Stephens, Ryle, Wilson, Neal, Kirtley, Craig, Lodge, Goss and Gregory.
