= Piatt's Landing, Kentucky =

- Piatt's Landing
- U.S. National Register of Historic Places
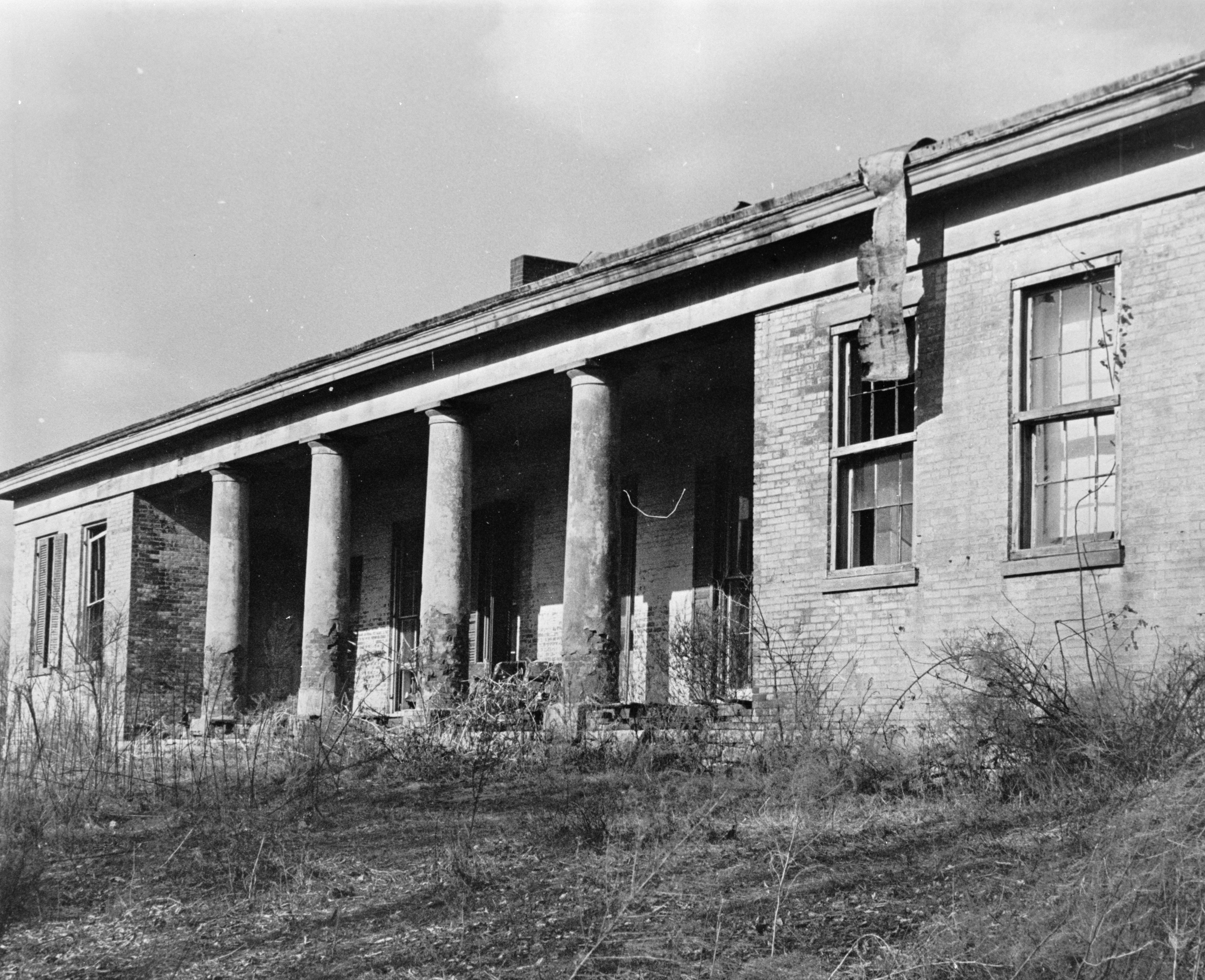
- The site in 1975

- Location within Kentucky Location within the United States
- Nearest city: Burlington, Kentucky
- Coordinates: 38°54′5″N 84°51′33″W
- Built: 1800
- NRHP reference No.: 74000849
- Added to NRHP: July 18, 1974

Piatt's Landing was an early nineteenth century riverboat and ferry landing on the Ohio River in Boone County, Kentucky. It is located near Route 338 almost due west of downtown Union. The landing and Winnfield Cottage, which no longer exists, were built by Robert Piatt, the grandfather of Civil War General Edward Canby. Ferries owned by the Piatts crossed the Ohio River to Indiana at several points; Touseytown to Lawrenceburg, Rabbit Hash to Rising Sun, and East Bend to North Landing. (Shaffer, p. 42) A number of the Piatts associated with this family also lived in Norwood, Ohio.

The name Piatt is of Italian origin, according to N. L. Lodge (p. 1), and the original spelling was Piatti. (Note: N.L. Lodge's work is not deemed reliable by many researchers. The name Piatt was FRENCH, and was originally spelled Piat. The family came from the Province of Dauphine, near Grenoble, France. Rene Piat LeFleur was a Huguenot refugee who emigrated in the 1670s. He first went to London, where he was "denizated" a British citizen. He later migrated to Long Island, where he married Elizabeth Sheffield, an Englishwoman. They settled in New Jersey. Virtually all Piatts in America are descended from them.)

== See also ==
- Anderson Ferry: current ferry also in Boone County
- National Register of Historic Places listings in Boone County, Kentucky
