= William Fitzhugh (disambiguation) =

William Fitzhugh (1741–1809) was an American planter, legislator, and patriot.

William Fitzhugh may also refer to:

- William FitzHugh, 4th Baron FitzHugh (1399–1452), English nobleman and member of parliament
- William Henry Fitzhugh (1792–1830), Virginia planter and politician
- William F. Fitzhugh (1818–1883), American Confederate soldier and Texas Ranger
- William W. Fitzhugh (born 1943), American archaeologist and anthropologist
- William Fitzhugh (MP) (1757–1842), English politician and member of parliament

== See also ==
- W. Fitzhugh Brundage (born 1959), American historian
- William Henry Fitzhugh Lee (1837–1891), American planter, general, and politician
