= Boone County Distillery Superintendent's House and Guest House =

Historic house in Kentucky, United States

- U.S. National Register of Historic Places
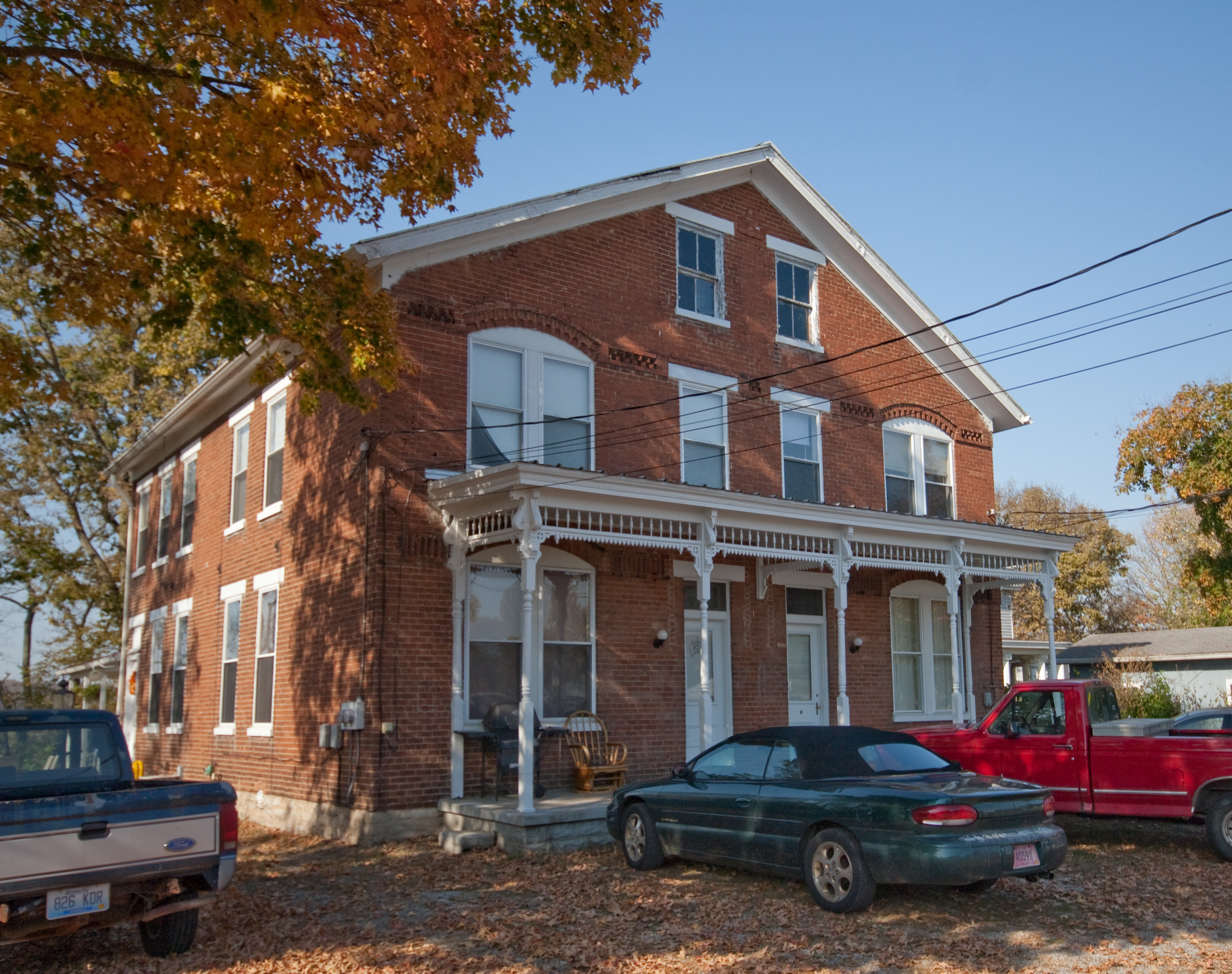

- Location within Kentucky Location within the United States
- Location: 3073 Front St., Petersburg, Boone County, Kentucky
- Coordinates: 39°4′10″N 84°52′15″W
- Area: .45 acres (0.18 ha)
- Built: 1885
- NRHP reference No.: 88003256
- Added to NRHP: February 6, 1989

The Boone County Distillery Superintendent's House and Guest House is a historic house located in Petersburg, Kentucky. It was added to the National Register of Historic Places in 1989.

The building was planned with four apartments, two up and two down. The two first-floor units have shed roofed kitchens, lacking on the second floor. This is a rare surviving example of a 19th-century multiple residence structure in Boone County.

The Boone County Distillery was a major local industry between the American Civil War and 1916, consisting at the time of the 1883 atlas of approximately 25 buildings, most of which have been demolished. The only other known distillery located in Boone County was in the Ohio River town of Hamilton, and none of the buildings associated with that distillery remain.
