= Prospect Farm =

Historic house in Kentucky, United States

- U.S. National Register of Historic Places
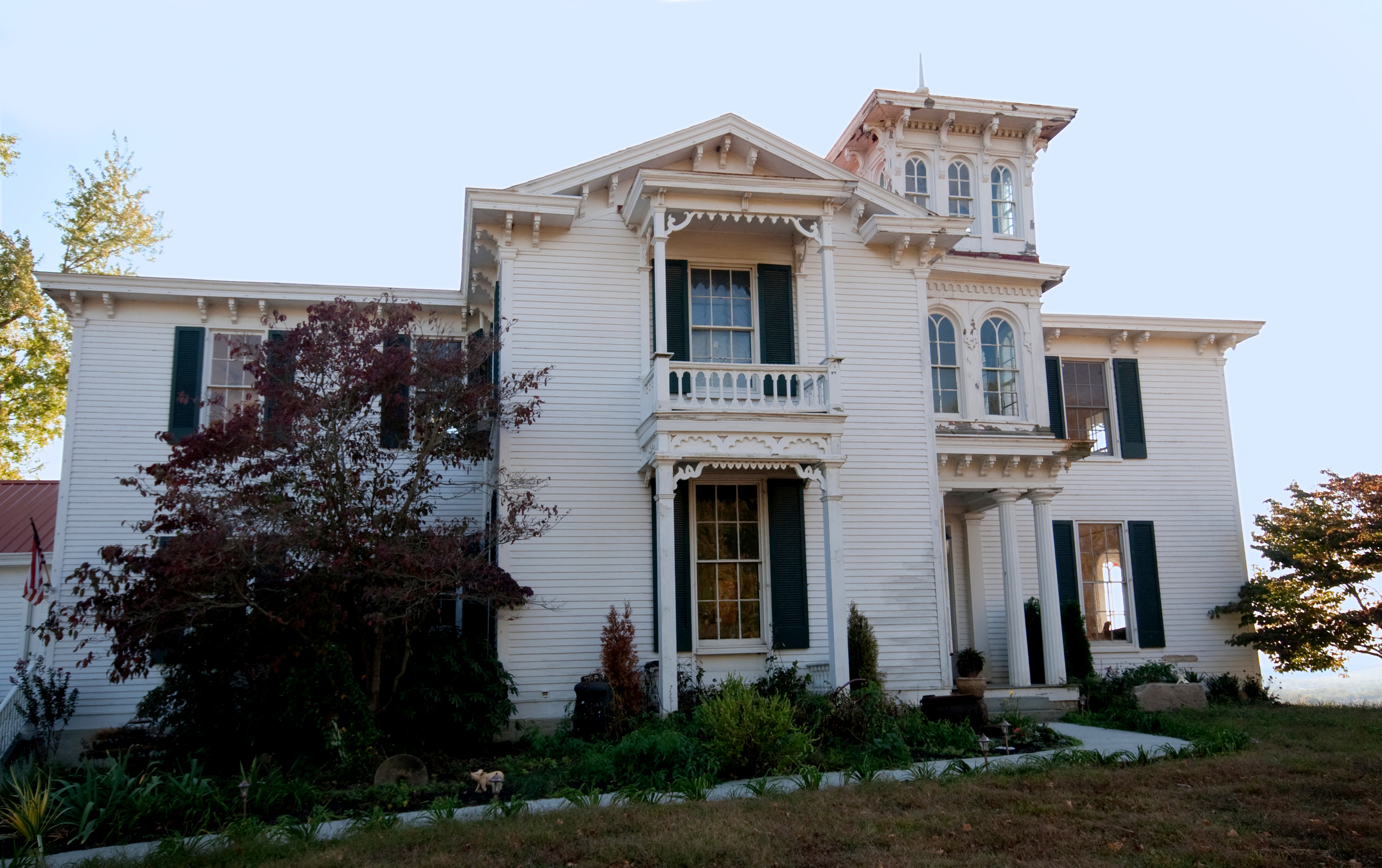

- Location within Kentucky Location within the United States
- Location: 6279 Petersburg Rd., Petersburg, Kentucky
- Coordinates: 39°3′47″N 84°51′47″W
- Built: 1857
- Architectural style: Italianate, Gothic, Greek Revival and Moorish
- MPS: Boone County MRA
- NRHP reference No.: 88003265
- Added to NRHP: February 6, 1989

Prospect Farm was built by steamboat captain J. C. Jenkins on a hill overlooking Petersburg, Kentucky. Jenkins was born in Orange County, Virginia and moved to Boone County in 1832. He invested in the Boone County Distilling Company and also raised cattle on the 1,200 acres then comprising Prospect Farm.

The house includes a three-stage tower in three different styles; a two-story, semi-octagonal facade bay; and two-tier side porches. It was built in 1857 and an addition was completed in 1860. The house was added to the National Register of Historic Places in 1989.

Statement of Significance
"The house is significant under criterion C as an excellent example of the Italianate style, significant to Boone County in the period 1855-1910, and as an excellent (and only) example of the Italian Villa style, which used Italianate elements but featured a tower. The house is also an excellent local example of the broad trend in 19th century architecture of eclectic mixing of picturesque styles and forms. The property is also significant under criterion A as a good example of a large farm in Boone County in the period 1855-1938."

== See also ==
- National Register of Historic Places listings in Kentucky
