= John Tanner House =

Historic house in Kentucky, United States

- U.S. National Register of Historic Places
- Location within Kentucky Location within the United States
- Location: Petersburg, Kentucky
- Coordinates: 39°3′54″N 84°51′52″W
- Built: c. 1810
- Architectural style: Federal
- MPS: Early Stone Buildings of Kentucky Outer Bluegrass and Pennyrile TR
- NRHP reference No.: 87000207
- Added to NRHP: January 8, 1987

The John Tanner House is a stone house located in Petersburg, Kentucky, United States, built around 1810. It is the oldest stone house existing in Boone County. It is located on Route 20 East.

It was built by John Tanner, the first Baptist preacher in Kentucky, who founded the community, originally called Tanner's Station, which became Petersburg in 1814.
