= Charles Clinton Fleek =

US Army soldier and Medal of Honor recipient

- Army Medal of Honor
- Born: August 28, 1947; Petersburg, Boone County, Kentucky, US
- Died: May 27, 1969 (aged 21); Bình Dương Province, Republic of Vietnam
- Military career
- Allegiance: United States of America
- Branch: United States Army
- Service years: 1968–1969
- Rank: Sergeant
- Units: 27th Infantry Regiment, 25th Infantry Division
- Conflicts: Vietnam War †
- Awards: Medal of Honor

Charles Clinton "Chalky" Fleek (August 28, 1947 – May 27, 1969) was a United States Army soldier and a posthumous recipient of the United States military's highest decoration—the Medal of Honor—for his actions in the Vietnam War.

== Biography ==
Fleek joined the Army from Cincinnati, Ohio, in 1968, and by May 27, 1969, was serving as a sergeant in Company C, 1st Battalion, 27th Infantry Regiment, 25th Infantry Division. During a firefight on that day, in Bình Dương Province, Republic of Vietnam, Fleek used his helmet to scoop up an enemy-thrown hand grenade. The grenade exploded before he could get it away from his body, sacrificing his life to protect those around him.

On August 17, 2018, a section of state highway Kentucky Route 20 in Petersburg, was named the Charles "Chalky" Fleek Memorial Highway.

== Medal of Honor citation ==
Sergeant Fleek's official Medal of Honor citation reads:

For conspicuous gallantry and intrepidity in action at the risk of his life above and beyond the call of duty. Sgt. Fleek distinguished himself while serving as a squad leader in Company C, during an ambush operation. Sgt. Fleek's unit was deployed in ambush locations when a large enemy force approached the position. Suddenly, the leading enemy element, sensing the ambush, halted and started to withdraw. Reacting instantly, Sgt. Fleek opened fire and directed the effective fire of his men upon the numerically superior enemy force. During the fierce battle that followed, an enemy soldier threw a grenade into the squad position. Realizing that his men had not seen the grenade, Sgt. Fleek, although in a position to seek cover, shouted a warning to his comrades and threw himself onto the grenade, absorbing its blast. His gallant action undoubtedly saved the lives or prevented the injury of at least 8 of his fellow soldiers. Sgt. Fleek's gallantry and willing self-sacrifice were in keeping with the highest traditions of the military service and reflect great credit on himself, his unit, and the U.S. Army.

== See also ==
- List of Medal of Honor recipients for the Vietnam War
