= Farmers Bank of Petersburg =

- U.S. National Register of Historic Places
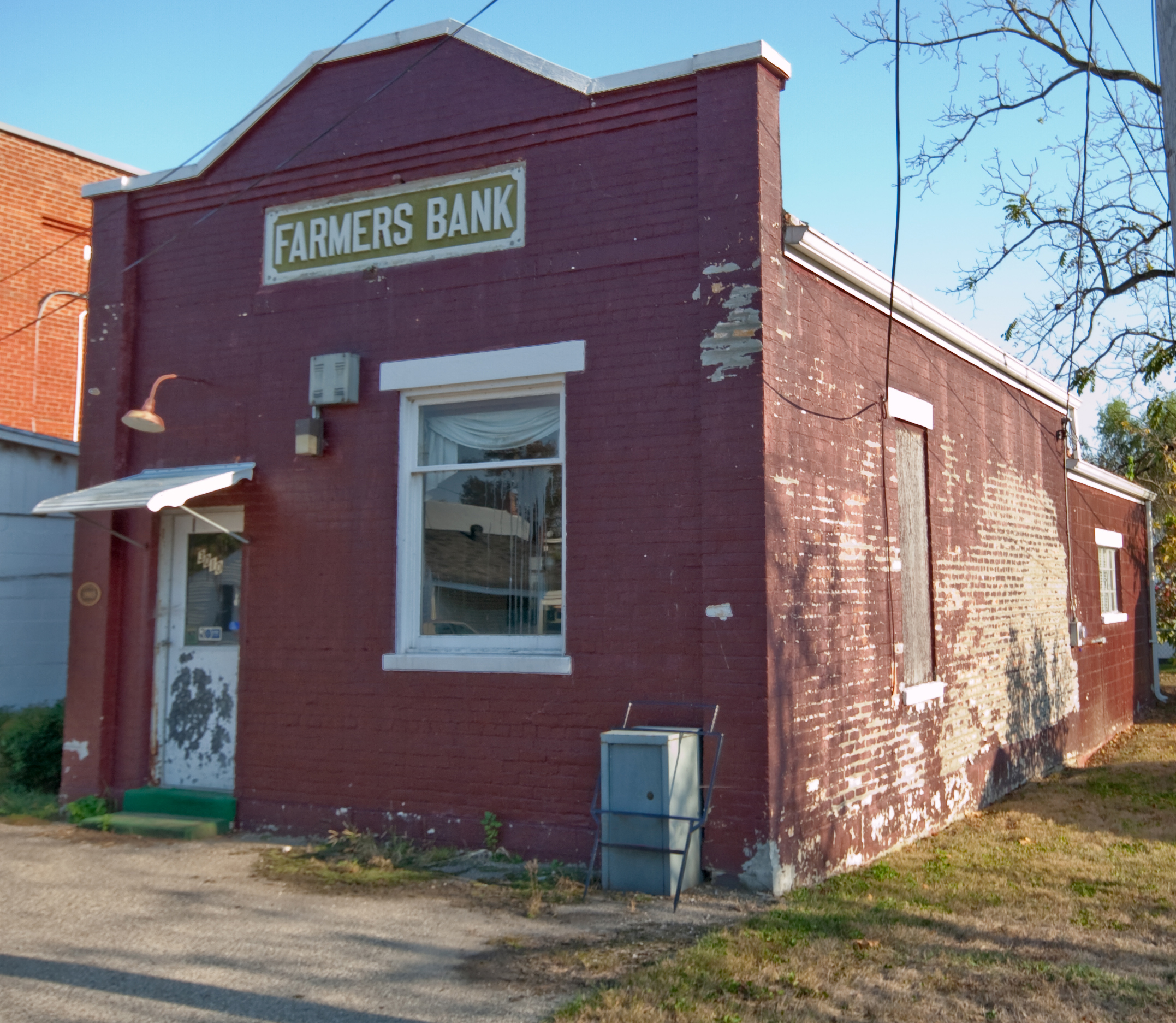

- Location within Kentucky Location within the United States
- Location: 3010 1st St., Petersburg, Kentucky
- Coordinates: 39°4′9″N 84°52′5″W
- Area: 0.1 acres (0.040 ha)
- Architectural style: Vernacular Commercial
- MPS: Boone County MRA
- NRHP reference No.: 88003261
- Added to NRHP: February 6, 1989

The Farmers Bank of Petersburg is a historic building in Petersburg, Kentucky; it was added to the National Register of Historic Places on February 6, 1989. The building is an excellent example of vernacular commercial architecture of the early 20th century (1900–1930).

Farmers Bank of Petersburg was founded in 1903 and closed in 1970. It was the fourth bank organized in Boone County, after Burlington, Walton, and Hebron, and was the only bank serving the western portion of Boone County.

== Architectural details ==
The boomtown facade indicates commercial use of the one-story gable-front building. The upper portion of the facade rests on a stone string course. Lintels and sills are made of smooth cut stone and the facade parapet is capped with tin.

== Gallery ==
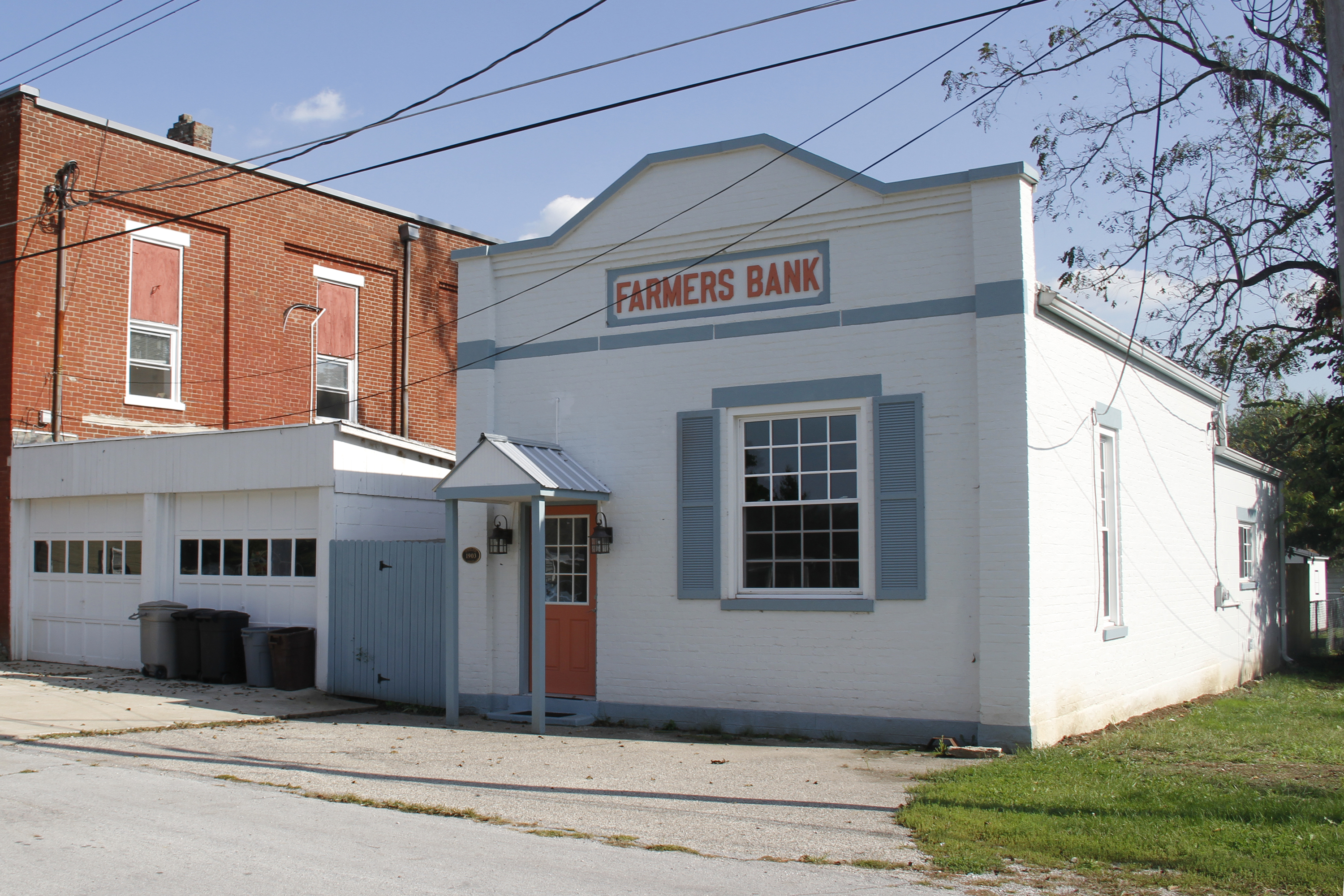
The building in 2012
