= Christian Meeting House =

Historic church in Kentucky, United States

- U.S. National Register of Historic Places
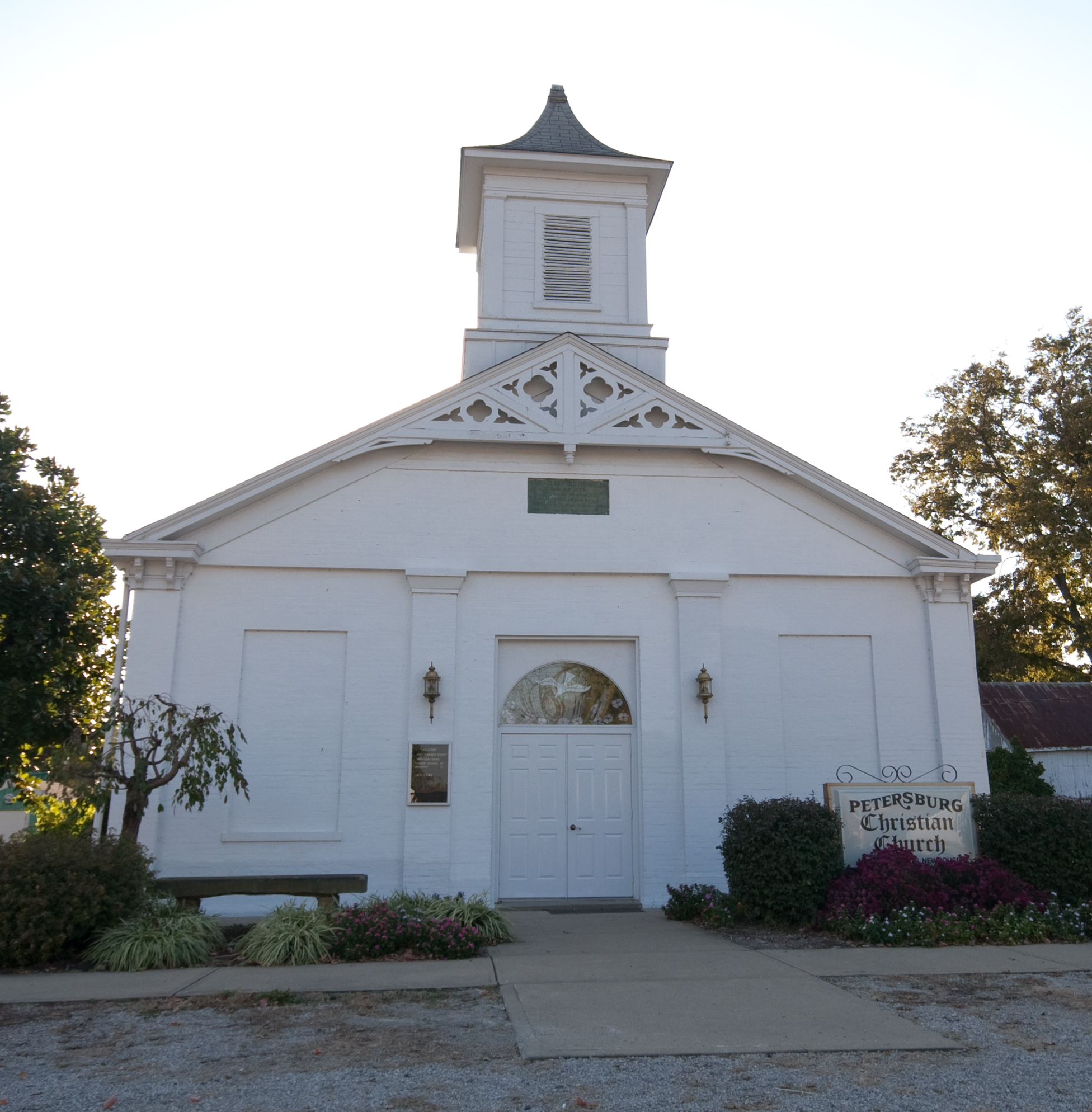

- Location within Kentucky Location within the United States
- Location: 6561 Tanner St., Petersburg, Kentucky
- Coordinates: 39°4′7″N 84°52′6″W
- Area: 0.3 acres (0.12 ha)
- Built: 1840
- Architectural style: Greek Revival Picturesque, Eclectic vernacular
- MPS: Boone County MRA
- NRHP reference No.: 88003262
- Added to NRHP: February 6, 1989

Christian Meeting House (Petersburg Christian Church) is a historic church meeting house at 6561 Tanner Street in Petersburg, Kentucky.

The original congregation was organized in 1824 by Alexander Campbell from Virginia. The structure was built in 1840 and added to the National Register of Historic Places in 1989.

The architecture reflects the shift in styles from the classical Greek Revival to the more romantic or picturesque forms prevalent in Boone County during the period 1835–1890. Stylistic modifications to the building made in the 1870s include grouped brackets at the eaves, a decorative gable-peak of Gothic origins, and a louvered bell tower with pilasters and a concave-pyramidal peak.

== See also ==
- National Register of Historic Places listings in Kentucky
