= Donald Barger House =

Historic house in Kentucky, United States

- U.S. National Register of Historic Places
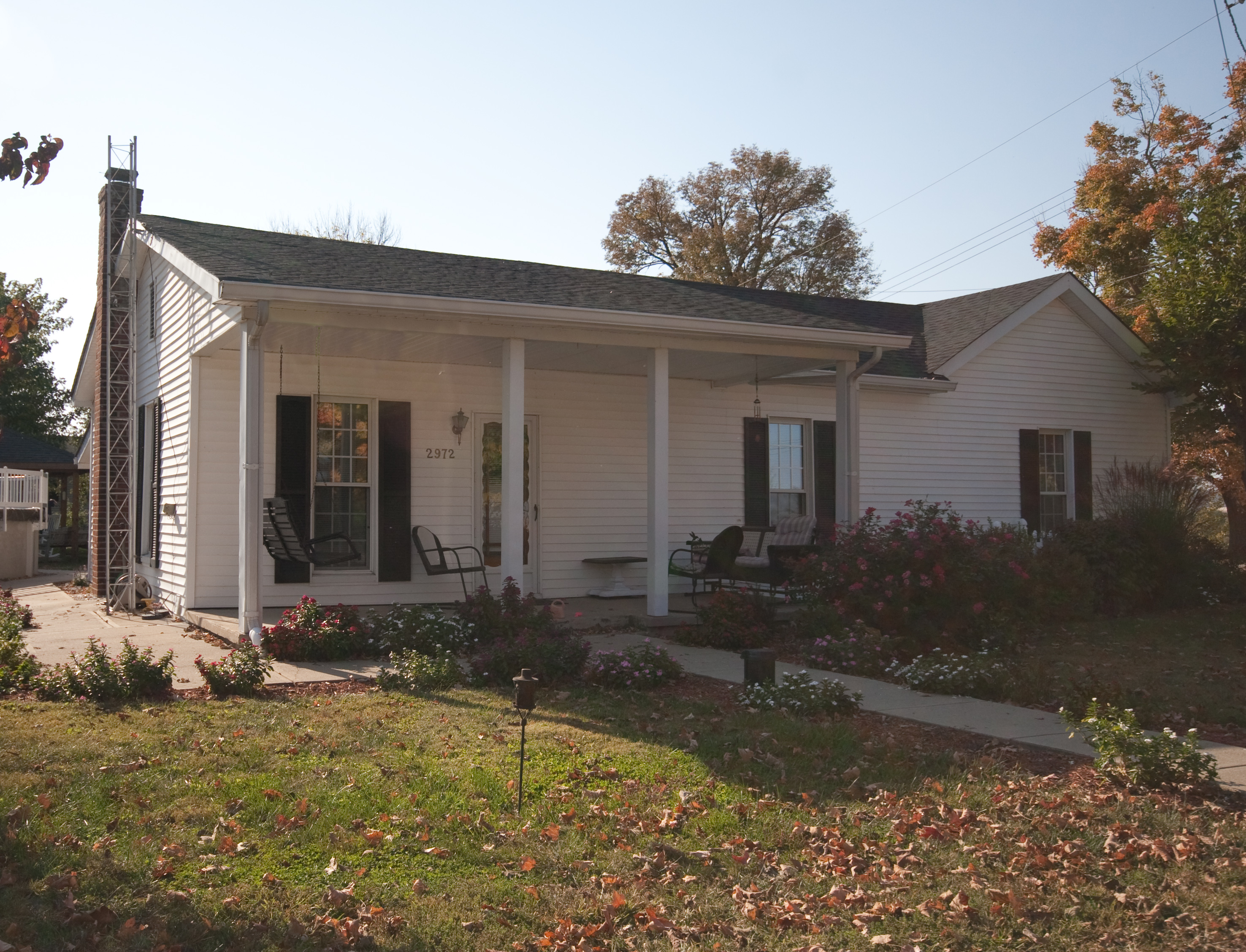
- Location: 2972 Front St., Petersburg, Boone County, Kentucky
- Coordinates: 39°04′14″N 84°52′02″W
- Area: 0.2 acres (0.081 ha)
- MPS: Boone County MRA
- NRHP reference No.: 88003259
- Added to NRHP: February 6, 1989

The Donald Barger House, at 2972 Front St., at the corner of Main St., in Petersburg, Boone County, Kentucky, was listed on the National Register of Historic Places in 1989.

It was deemed significant "as a good and particularly well-preserved representative of approximately a dozen hall-parlor cottages in Petersburg, and of the ten hall-parlor houses surveyed in the rest of Boone County."
