= Belleview, Kentucky =

Unincorporated community in Kentucky, United States

- Census-designated place (CDP)
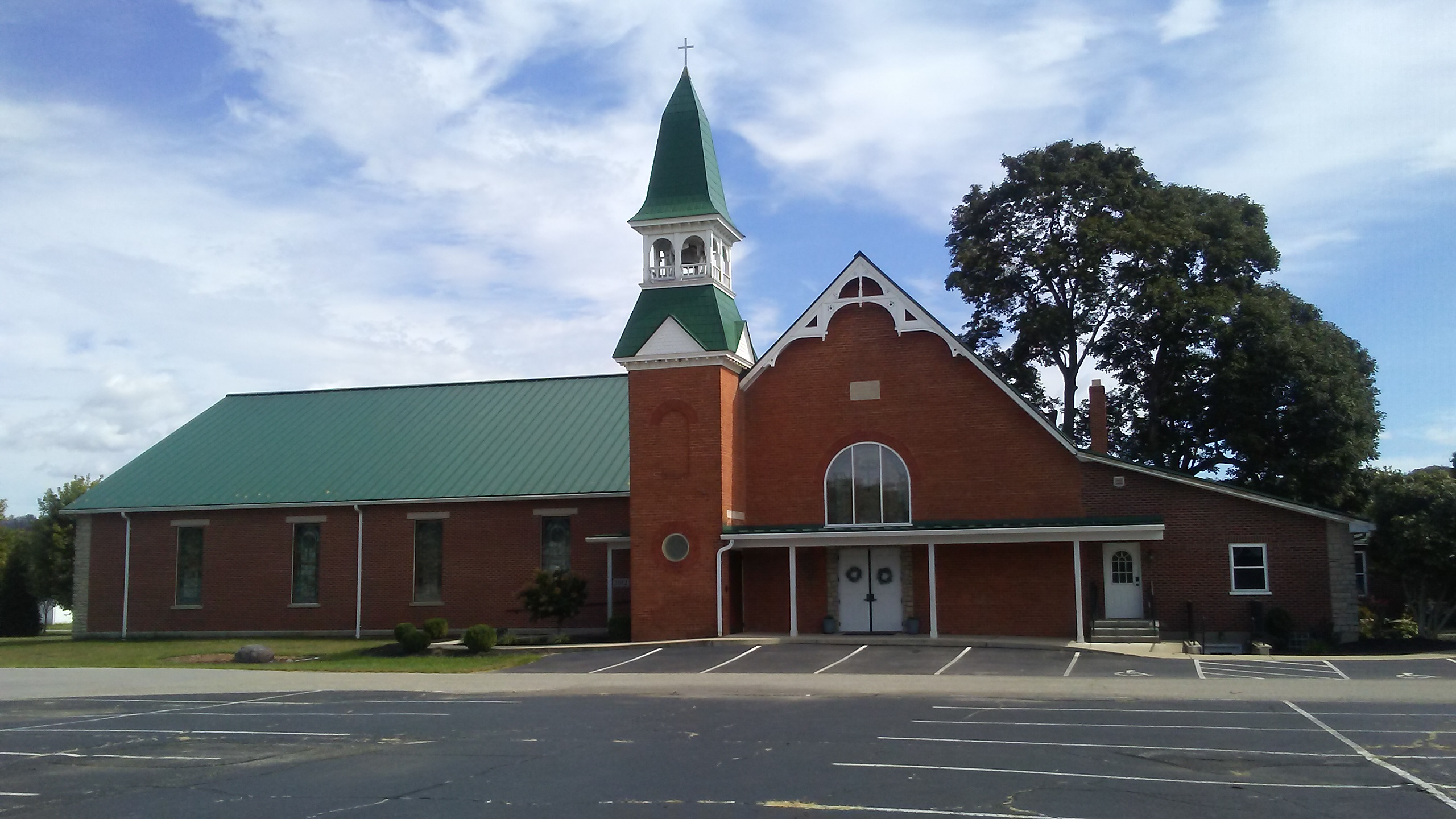
- Belleview Baptist Church

- Location within Boone County and the state of Kentucky
- Coordinates: 38°58′45″N 84°49′30″W
- Country: United States
- State: Kentucky
- County: Boone

Area
  - Total: 1.86 sq mi (4.82 km^{2})
  - Land: 1.36 sq mi (3.52 km^{2})
  - Water: 0.50 sq mi (1.30 km^{2})
- Elevation: 495 ft (151 m)

Population (2020)
  - Total: 308
  - Density: 226.4/sq mi (87.42/km^{2})
- Time zone: UTC-5 (Eastern (EST))
  - Summer (DST): UTC-4 (EDT)
- Area code: 859
- FIPS code: 21-05428
- GNIS feature ID: 2629575

Belleview is an unincorporated community and census-designated place (CDP) in Boone County, Kentucky, United States. The population was 308 as of the 2020 Census, down from 343 from the 2010 census.

== Geography ==
Belleview is located in western Boone County along the Ohio River, 24 miles (39 km) southwest of downtown Cincinnati. Kentucky Route 18 (Burlington Pike) runs east from Belleview 7 miles (11 km) to Burlington (the Boone County seat) and 13 miles (21 km) to Florence.

According to the United States Census Bureau, Belleview has a total area of 1.9 square miles (4.8 km^{2}), of which 1.4 square miles (3.5 km^{2}) is land and 0.50 square miles (1.3 km^{2}), or 26.99%, is water, consisting of the Ohio River out to its centerline, which is the border with Indiana.

Belleview is the location of six places listed on the U.S. National Register of Historic Places:

- Belleview Baptist Church
- Belleview Post Office
- Clore House
- Jonas Clore House
- Flick House
- James Rogers House

Historical population
Census	Pop.	Note	%±
2010	343		—
2020	308		−10.2%
U.S. Decennial Census
