= Florence Fire Station =

- U.S. National Register of Historic Places
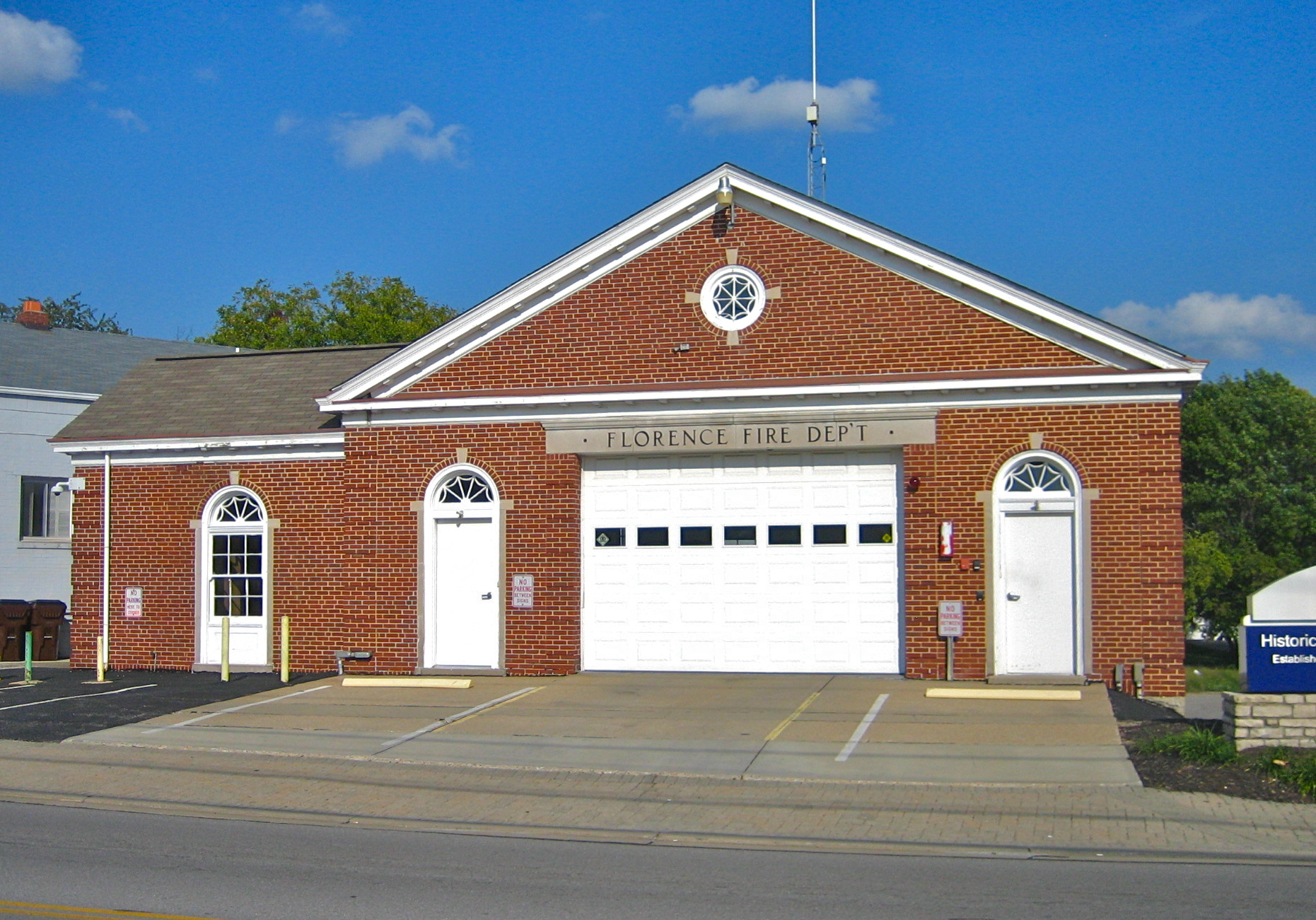
- Location: Main St., Florence, Kentucky
- Coordinates: 39°00′03″N 84°37′37″W
- Area: less than one acre
- Built: 1937
- Architectural style: Colonial Revival, Georgian Revival
- MPS: Boone County MRA
- NRHP reference No.: 88003301
- Added to NRHP: February 6, 1989

The Florence Fire Station on Main Street in Florence, Kentucky was built in 1937. It was listed on the National Register of Historic Places in 1989.

It was deemed "a good example of the Georgian Revival/Colonial Revival style, significant to Boone County in the period 1900-1945." It was the station of the Florence Volunteer Fire Department, organized in 1934. Among its initial efforts, Albert Hue, organizer, bought a 1913 Ahrens-Fox fire pumper for $75 and borrowed hose from the Elsmere Fire Department.
