= East Bend Church =

Historic church in Kentucky, United States

- U.S. National Register of Historic Places
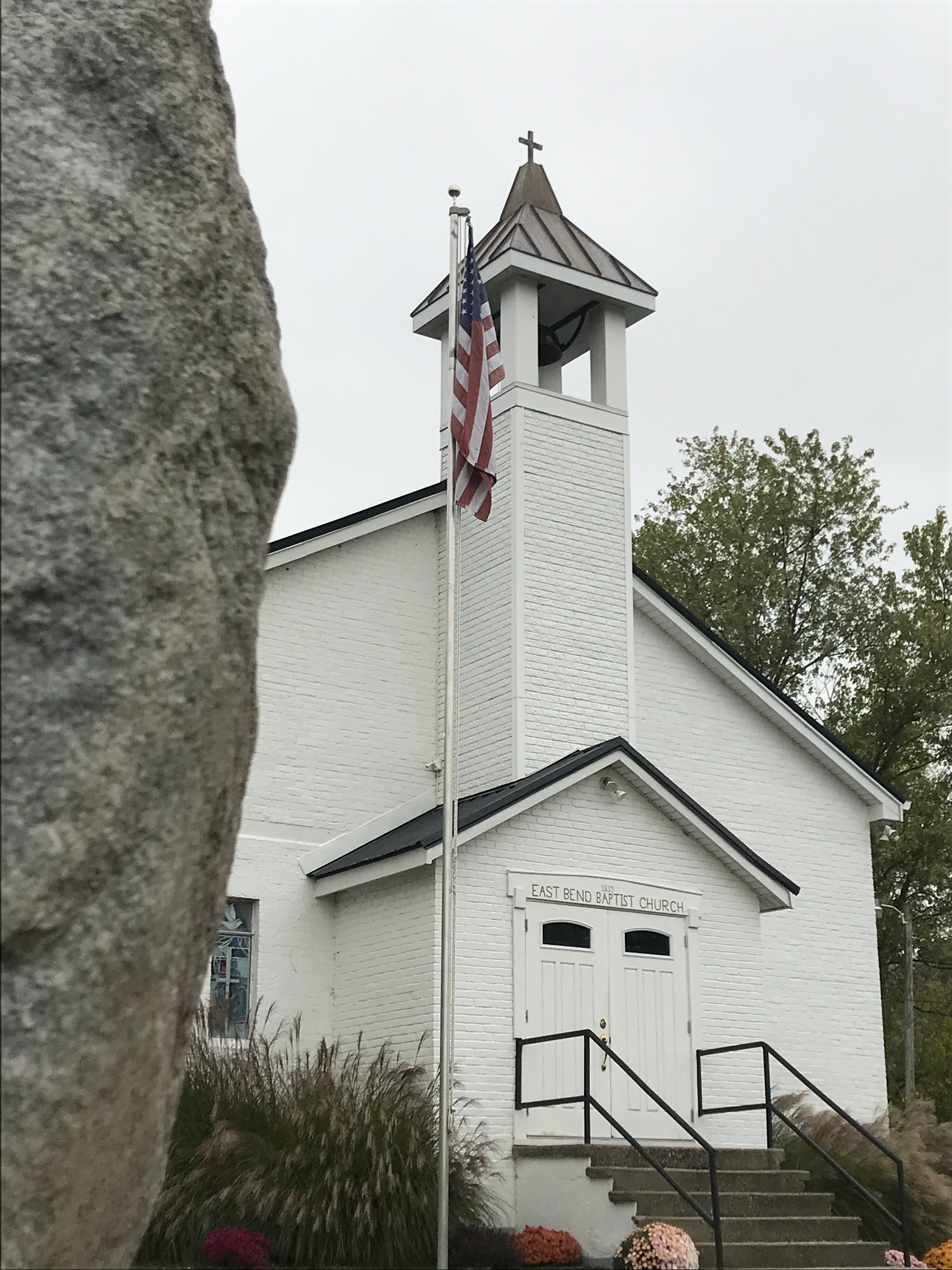

- Location within Kentucky Location within the United States
- Nearest city: Union, Kentucky
- Coordinates: 38°55′9″N 84°51′31″W
- Area: 1.5 acres (0.61 ha)
- Architectural style: Greek Revival
- MPS: Boone County MRA
- NRHP reference No.: 88003291
- Added to NRHP: February 6, 1989

East Bend Baptist Church is a historic church in Boone County, Kentucky near Rabbit Hash. It was added to the National Register of Historic Places in 1989. Sometimes called "The white church" to differentiate from East Bend Methodist Church "the red church" located approximately 1/4 mile down the road.

It is a gable-front building with four windows on each side. It has common bond brickwork.

== See also ==
- National Register of Historic Places listings in Kentucky
