= B. C. Calvert House =

Historic house in Kentucky, United States

- U.S. National Register of Historic Places
- Location within Kentucky Location within the United States
- Coordinates: 38°56′26″N 84°50′47″W
- Built: 1875
- Architectural style: Late Victorian
- MPS: Boone County MRA
- NRHP reference No.: 88003292
- Added to NRHP: February 6, 1989

The B. C. Calvert House is a historic Late Victorian style house located in Union, Kentucky. It was built in 1875, and on February 6, 1989, it was added to the National Register of Historic Places.

It is a five-bay, central passage plan house with a three-bay porch with turned posts and a bracketed cornice. It was deemed notable as "a good example of Folk Victorian architecture significant to Boone County in the period 1875-1900."

The property includes two outbuildings and a brick smokehouse which are contemporary with the house.
