= William F. Fitzhugh =

American soldier, and Texas ranger

- Born: William F. Fitzhugh; 12 March 1818; Hamilton, Boone County, Kentucky
- Died: 23 October 1883 (aged 65); McKinney, Texas
- Spouse: Mary Jane Rattan
- Children: 7

William F. Fitzhugh (12 March 1818–23 October 1883) was an American Confederate Army Officer, and Texas Ranger.

== Life ==
Fitzhugh was born on 12 March 1818 in Hamilton, Kentucky to John Fitzhugh and Sarah Shelton. The family moved to Missouri and Fitzhugh volunteered during the Seminole War in Florida at the age of 17. Following his stint in the war, he returned to Missouri and was involved in the 1838 Mormon War which saw the Mormons evicted from Missouri.

The family relocated to Texas in 1845 and settled near the present site of Melissa where he married Mary Jane Rattan and received 640-acres of land.

He served in the First Regiment during the Mexican–American War under the command of Col. John Coffee Hays. During the following years, he settled in Collin County and primarily worked as a farmer, whilst also serving with the Texas Rangers. During the American Civil War, he joined the Confederate Army in March 1862, serving as first colonel of the Sixteenth Texas Cavalry.

During the Battle of Cotton Plant in Arkansas, he was evacuated from the battlefield after being wounded on his right arm. He returned to Melissa to continue farming.

He later served as a doorkeeper during the Constitutional Convention of 1875.

== Death ==
Fitzhugh died on October 23, 1883, after being thrown from a wagon. He was buried firstly at Forest Grove Cemetery in McKinney but was later reinterred at Fairview Cemetery in Denison.
