= Rabbit Hash Historic District =

Historic district in Kentucky, United States

- U.S. National Register of Historic Places
- U.S. Historic district
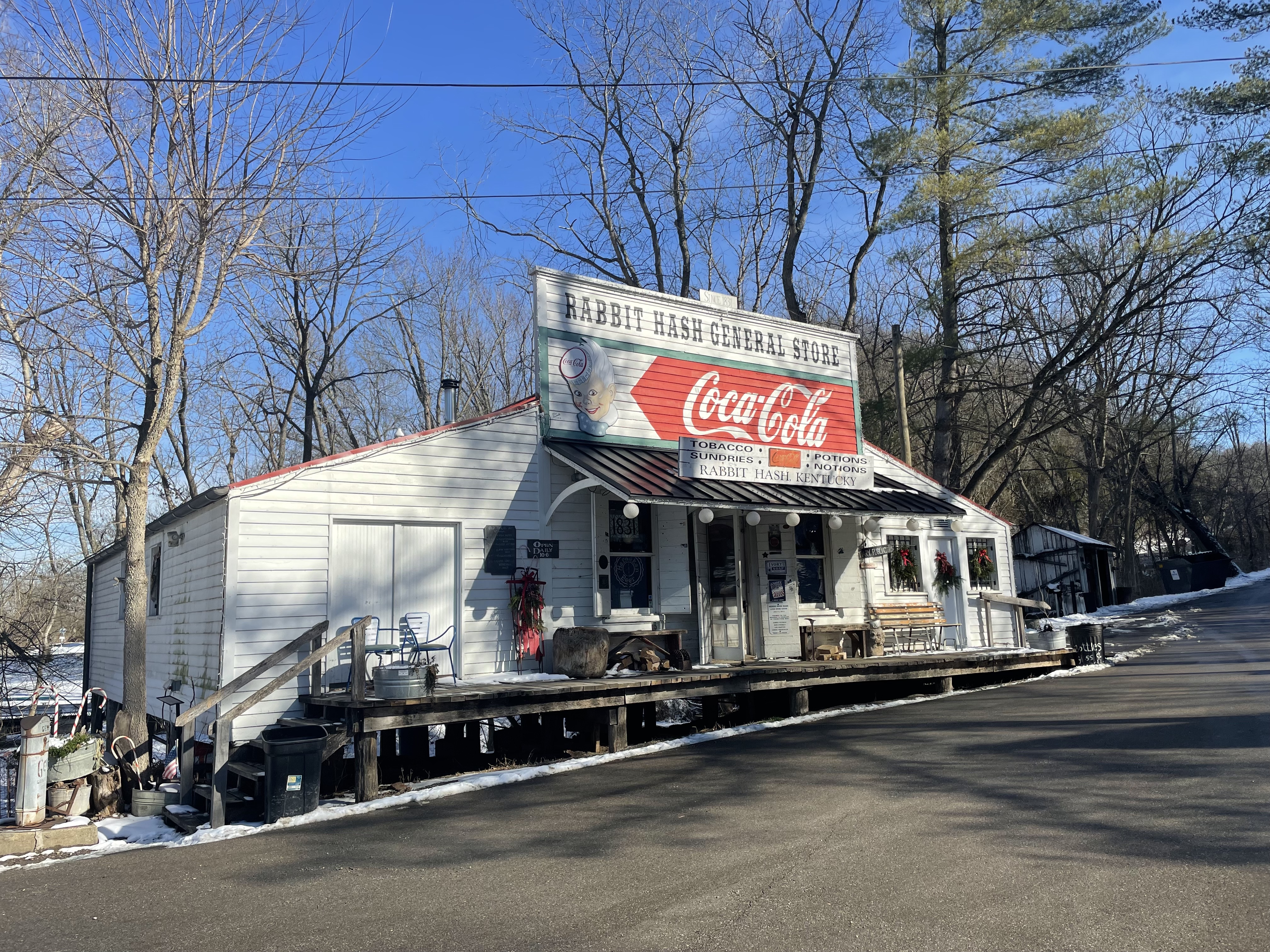

- Location within Kentucky Location within the United States
- Location: 10021–10410 Lower River Rd., Rabbit Hash, Kentucky
- Coordinates: 38°56′32″N 84°50′45″W
- Area: 33 acres (13 ha)
- MPS: Boone County, Kentucky MPS
- NRHP reference No.: 03001231

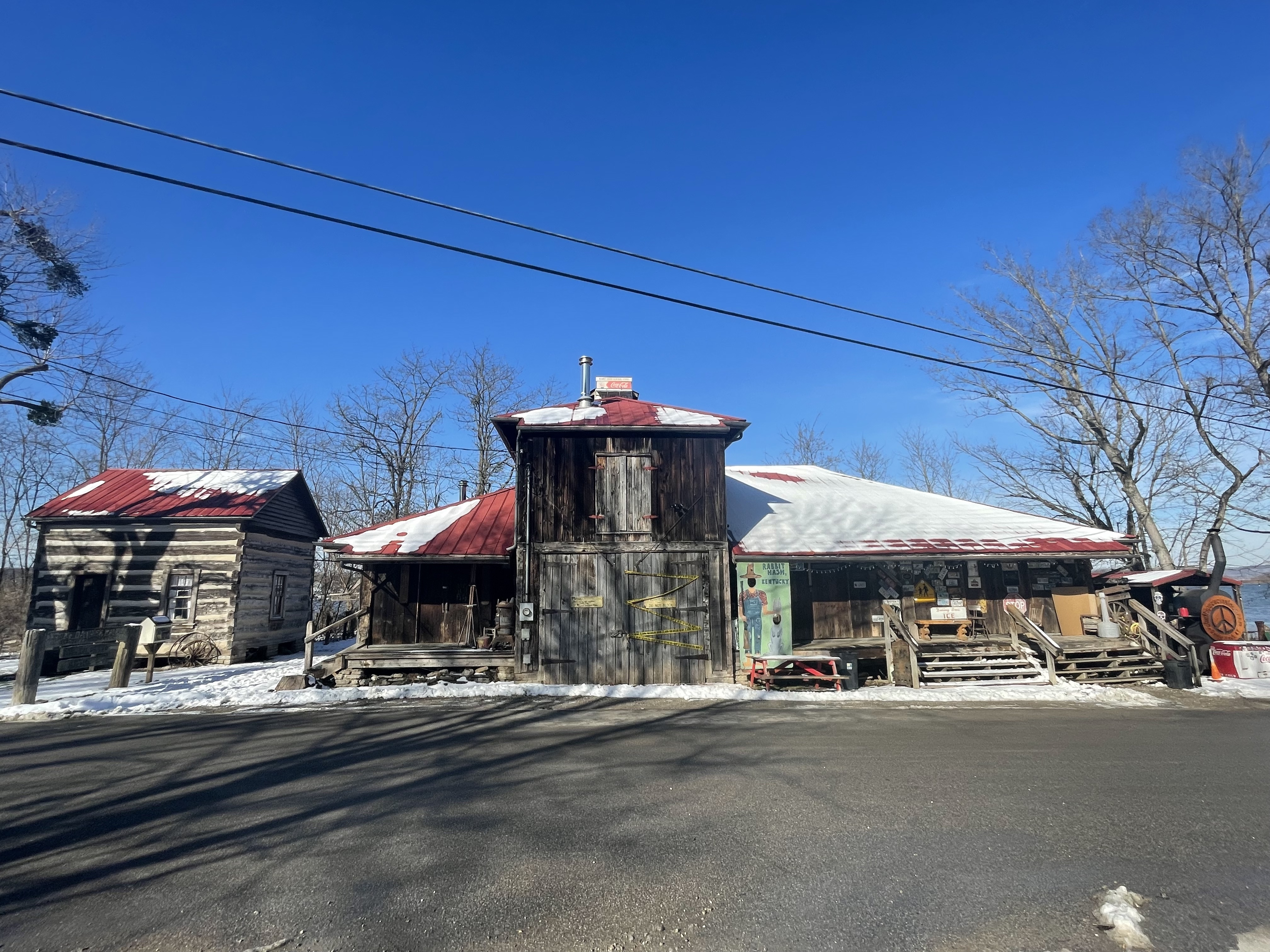
A few buildings in the Rabbit Hash Historic District along the banks of the Ohio River in late 2022.

The Rabbit Hash Historic District in Rabbit Hash, Kentucky was added to the National Register of Historic Places on December 4, 2003. It includes 330 acres (1.3 km^{2}), 12 buildings, 6 structures, and 3 objects around 10021-10410 Lower River Rd. The Rabbit Hash General Store, one of the addresses in the District, had already been listed since February 2, 1989.
