= Belleview Post Office =

- U.S. National Register of Historic Places
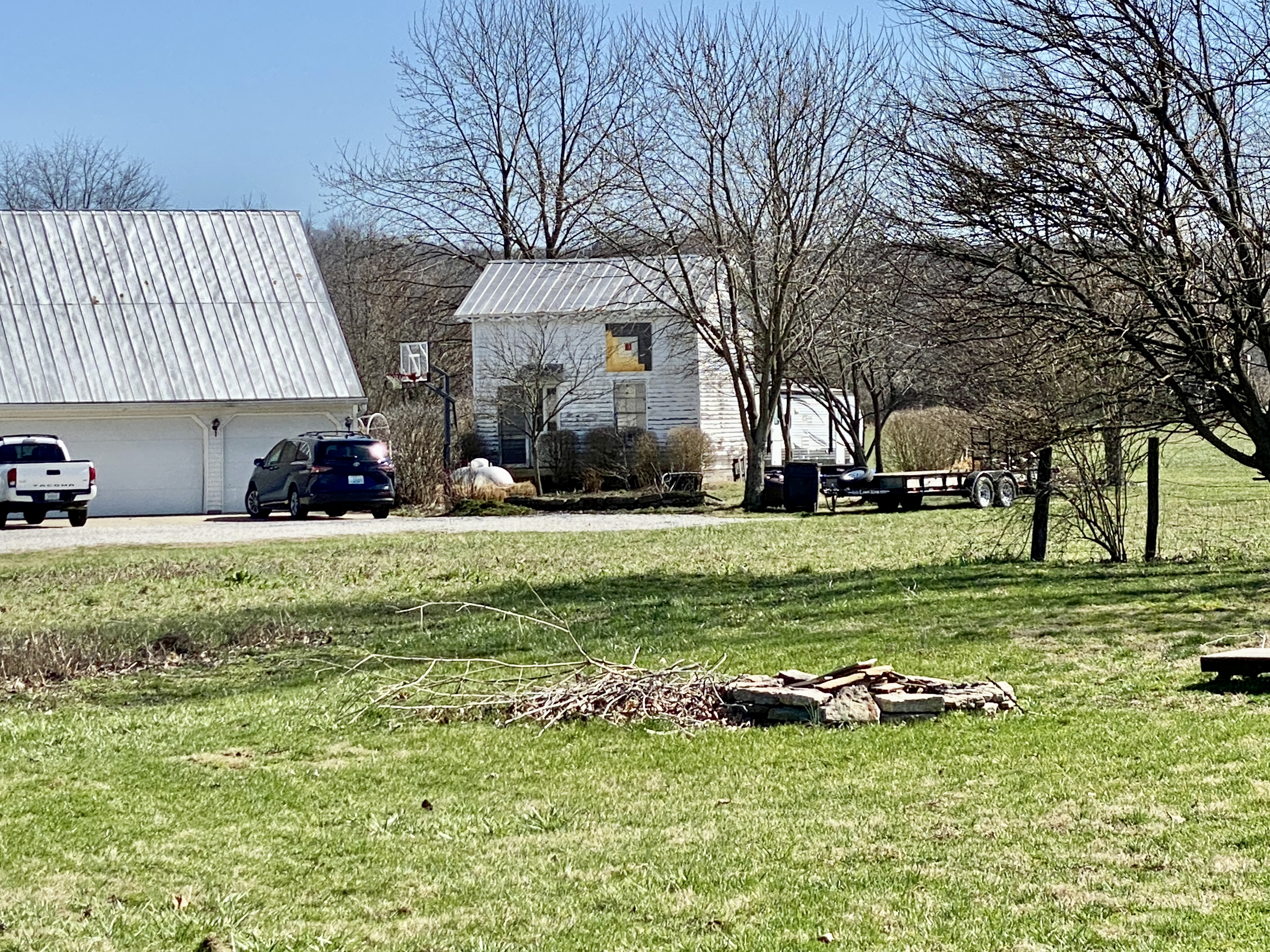

- Location within Kentucky Location within the United States
- Location: 6256 Main St., Belleview, Kentucky
- Coordinates: 38°59′09″N 84°49′35″W
- Area: 0.7 acres (0.28 ha)
- Built: c.1880
- Architectural style: Gothic Revival
- MPS: Boone County MRA
- NRHP reference No.: 88003250
- Added to NRHP: June 14, 1990

The Belleview Post Office, at 6256 Main St. in Belleview, Kentucky, was built around 1880. It has also been known as the Grant Post Office. It was listed on the National Register of Historic Places in 1990.

The building was used as a basket shop in the late 1800s, and then as a doctor's office. It served as a post office from around 1920 until 1970. The building was moved to 6235 Sycamore St., where it currently stands.
