= Stringtown, Boone County, Kentucky =

Unincorporated community in Kentucky, United States

Stringtown, Kentucky
- Unincorporated community
- Location within Kentucky
- Coordinates: 39°04′52″N 84°38′46″W
- Country: United States
- State: Kentucky
- County: Boone
- Elevation: 499 ft (152 m)
- Time zone: UTC-5 (Eastern (EST))
  - Summer (DST): UTC-4 (EDT)
- Area code: 859
- GNIS feature ID: 504589

Stringtown is an unincorporated community in Boone County, Kentucky, United States.
