= Code House =

- U.S. National Register of Historic Places
- Location within Kentucky Location within the United States
- Location: 965 Beaver Rd., near Walton, Kentucky
- Coordinates: 38°52′28″N 84°38′59″W
- Area: less than one acre
- Built: c. 1860
- Architectural style: Greek Revival
- MPS: Boone County, Kentucky MPS
- NRHP reference No.: 05001306
- Added to NRHP: November 25, 2005

The Code House, near Walton, Kentucky, was built around 1860. It was listed on the National Register of Historic Places in 2005.

It is a one-a-and-half-story saddlebag house on a stone foundation with clapboard siding. It has a spindlework porch which was added c.1890.
