= Hamilton, Kentucky =

Unincorporated community in Kentucky, United States

Hamilton
- Unincorporated community
- Location within the state of Kentucky Hamilton (the United States)
- Coordinates: 38°53′00″N 84°46′54″W
- Country: United States
- State: Kentucky
- County: Boone
- Time zone: UTC-5 (Eastern (EST))
  - Summer (DST): UTC-4 (EDT)

Hamilton is an unincorporated community in Boone County, Kentucky, United States. It is situated at Latitude 38.88333, Longitude -84.78167, in the southern part of the county on the Ohio River; it is about a mile north of the mouth of Big Bone Creek. It was established in 1835, being incorporated by the Kentucky Legislature as the Town of Landing. The plat laid out by Joel Hamilton and George McGlasson. The original trustees were: William Winston Jr., George McGlasson, Joel Hamilton, Henry L. Rose, James Dukan. The same year the Legislature provided a Constable for the town.

== History ==
In 1846 the name of the town was changed to Hamilton in honour of Joel Hamilton, the founder, who had since moved to Texas. The trustees of the town at this time were: Benjamin E. Garnett, John J. Miller, Marshall M. McManama, James R. Hawkins and Richard Johnson. The town was authorized to levy taxes the next year. This was a real estate tax, not to exceed fifty cents per hundred dollars.

The limits of the town of Hamilton were extended in 1849. A provision was added by the legislature that citizens of the town were not required to work on the road more than half a mile beyond the new limit. In 1852 a new road, the Hamilton and Union Turnpike was chartered. This may have been in conjunction with the incorporation of the Big Bone Hotel Company at the nearby Big Bone Springs the previous year. Other projects chartered in the area that year were the Napoleon and Big Bone Lick Turnpike, and the Union and Beaver Turnpike.

This seems to have been the high point of the town's history, though it was still a community up into the early part of the twentieth century. Lewis Loder (1819–1904), a magistrate and tavern keeper from Petersburg, Kentucky, in the same county, records going downriver to Hamilton on the steamer to purchase barrels of whiskey. The advance scouts of the Confederate army, from an encampment near Snow's Pond, visited the town in 1862, only to find that several troop transports of Union soldiers had camped there the night before, and were gone already. This was Hamilton's moment of attention by the opposing sides in that conflict. The fortunes of the town were closely linked with that of neighboring Big Bone, and was the point at which those visiting Big Bone Lick reached it by the river.

There are at the present time only a few houses on the site of the town. The Hamilton Graded School, with Silvian C. Hopkins as Principal, and two additional teachers, enrolled 143 pupils in 1954. In 1982 there were 120 students at the school, which was consolidated and closed soon after; the building was torn down.

== Notable people ==
- William F. Fitzhugh (1818–1883), Confederate Army Officer, and Texas Ranger.
