= Belleview Baptist Church =

Historic church in Kentucky, United States

- U.S. National Register of Historic Places
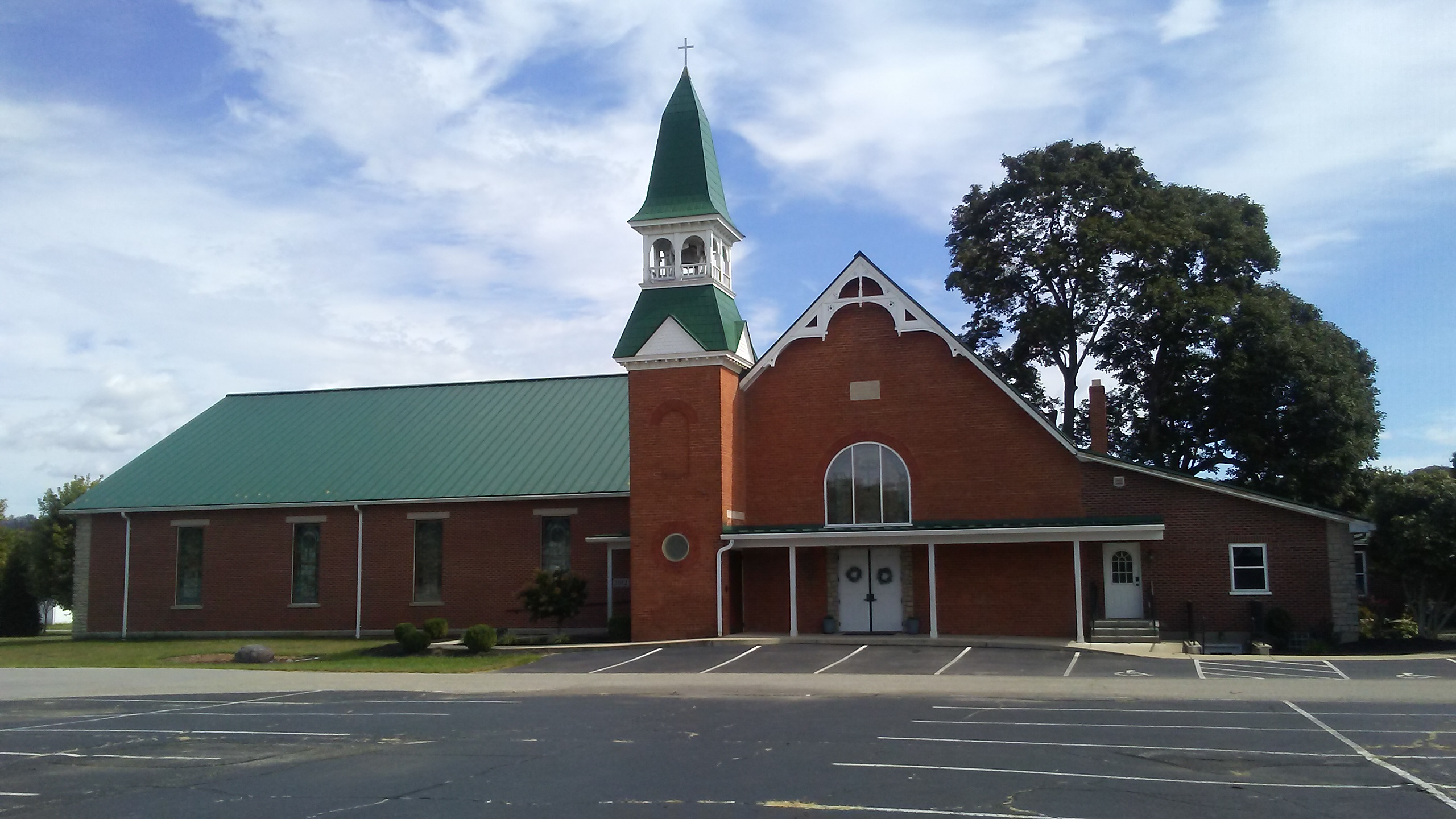

- Location within Kentucky Location within the United States
- Location: 6658 Fifth St. Belleview, Kentucky
- Coordinates: 38°59′9″N 84°49′35″W
- Area: 0.7 acres (0.28 ha)
- Built: 1903
- Architectural style: Eclectic
- MPS: Boone County MRA
- NRHP reference No.: 88003248
- Added to NRHP: February 6, 1989

Belleview Baptist Church is a historic Southern Baptist church at 6658 Fifth Street in Belleview, Kentucky. It was built in 1903 and added to the National Register in 1989.

The church, organized in 1803, built this building, its fourth, in its centennial year. The building has a complex entrance/bell tower.

== See also ==
- National Register of Historic Places listings in Kentucky
