= Clinton Blankenbeker House =

Historic house in Kentucky, United States

- U.S. National Register of Historic Places
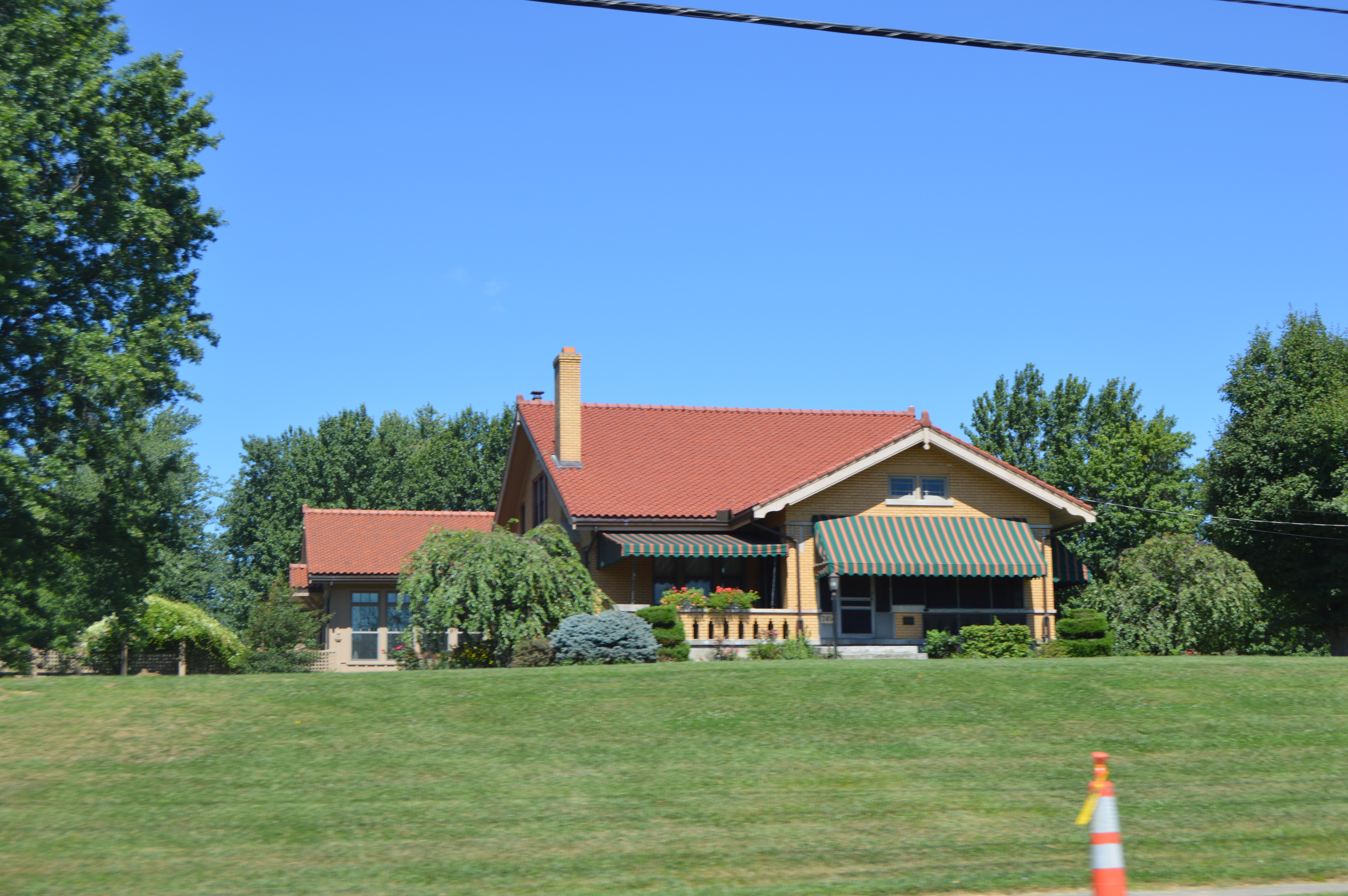

- Location within Kentucky Location within the United States
- Location: 7414 US 42, Florence, Kentucky
- Coordinates: 38°59′47″N 84°37′52″W
- Area: 1.4 acres (0.57 ha)
- Built: 1927
- Built by: Lloyd Aylor
- Architectural style: Bungalow/American craftsman
- MPS: Boone County MRA
- NRHP reference No.: 88003302
- Added to NRHP: February 6, 1989

The Clinton Blankenbeker House, at 7414 US 42 in Florence, Kentucky, is a historic house built in 1927. It was listed on the National Register of Historic Places in 1989. The listing also included two other contributing buildings and a contributing structure.

It is a one-and-a-half-story common bond brick house. It was deemed "a good example of the Craftsman/Bungalow style, significant to Boone County in the period 1905-1930. The garage, chicken coop, and well head are important outbuildings and related resources which define the architecture space and function of houses during the period of significance."
