= East Bend Generating Station =

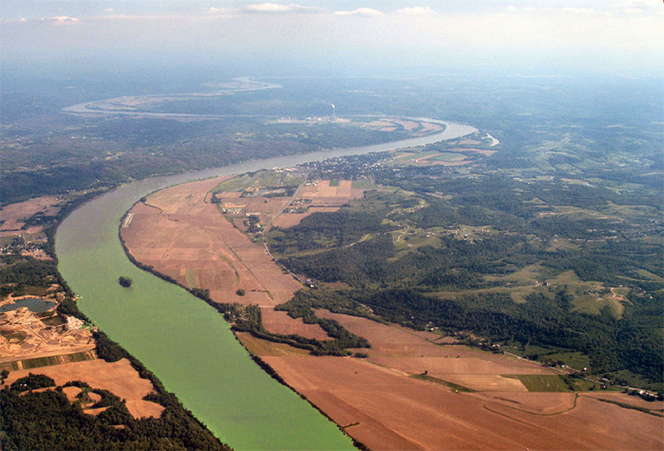
- East Bend Generating Station from a distance. The plant is located behind Rising Sun, Indiana in this view from the north.
- Country: United States
- Location: Boone County, near Union, Kentucky and Rising Sun, Indiana
- Coordinates: 38.90°N 84.85°W
- Commission date: 1981
- Owner: Duke Energy

Thermal power station
- Primary fuel: Bituminous coal
- Cooling source: Ohio River

Power generation
- Units operational: 1
- Nameplate capacity: 669 MW

The East Bend Generating Station is a coal-fired power plant owned and operated by Duke Energy near Rabbit Hash, Kentucky. It is located 10 miles west of Florence, Kentucky. The closest city is Rising Sun, Indiana, which lies to the northwest, across the Ohio River. Originally planned for four units, only unit no. 2 was built and is in commission.

== Emissions data ==
- 2006 CO_{2} Emissions: 4,671,336 tons
- 2006 SO_{2} Emissions: 3,947 tons
- 2006 SO_{2} Emissions per MWh:
- 2006 NO_{x} Emissions: 5,400 tons
- 2005 Mercury Emissions: 86 lb.

== See also ==
- Coal mining in Kentucky
