= John Delehunty House =

- U.S. National Register of Historic Places
- Location: 212 Main St., Florence, Kentucky
- Coordinates: 39°00′12″N 84°37′24″W
- Area: less than one acre
- Built: 1920
- Architectural style: Tudor Revival
- MPS: Boone County MRA
- NRHP reference No.: 88003300
- Added to NRHP: February 6, 1989

The John Delehunty House, at 212 Main St. in Florence, Kentucky, was a historic Tudor Revival-style house built in 1920.

It was deemed significant as "a good example of the Tudor Revival style significant to Boone County in the period 1910-1940", one of just two Tudor Revival buildings in Boone County identified in a study of historic resources.

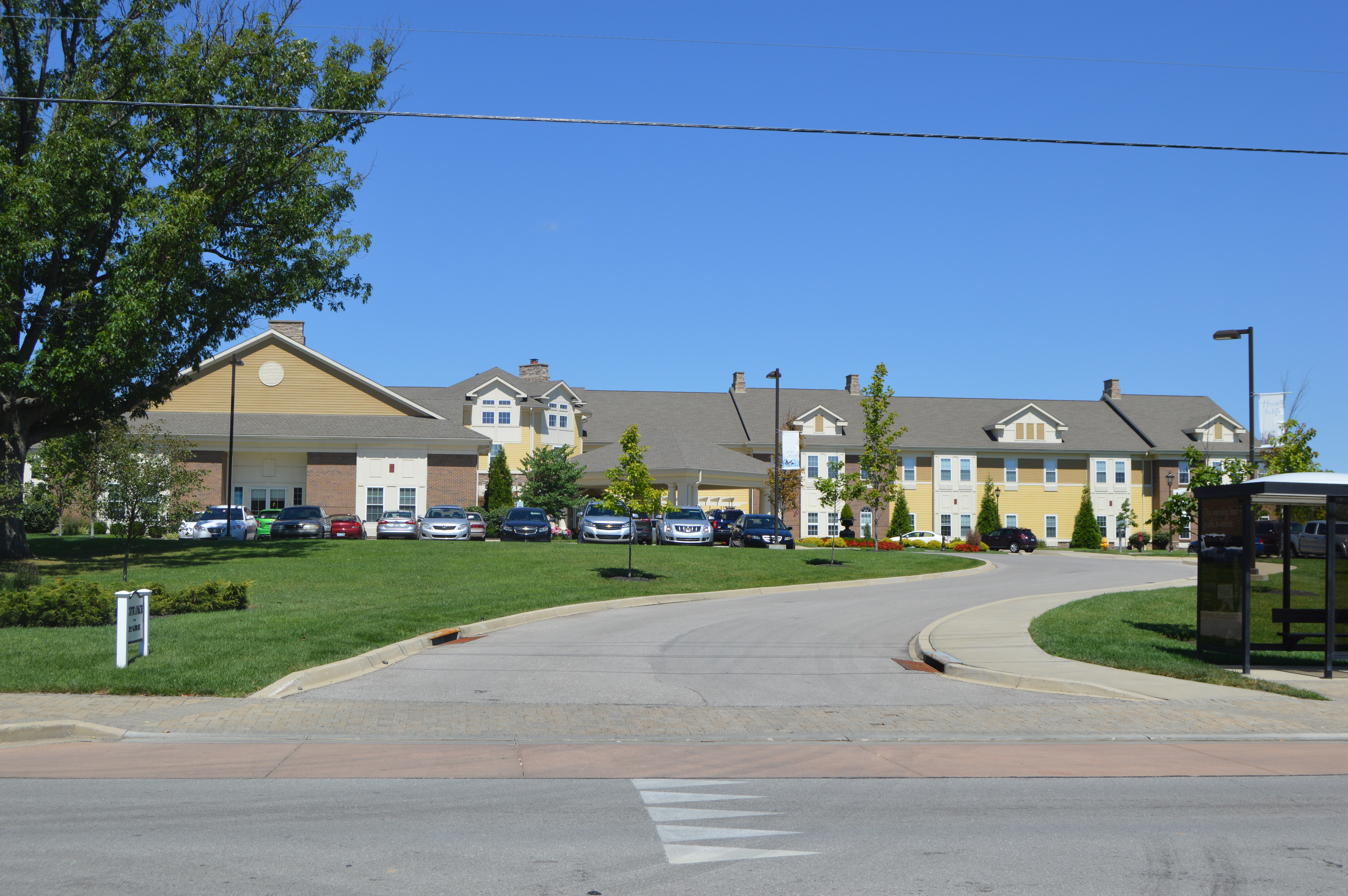
Elmcroft of Florence nursing home building which apparently replaced it, photographed in 2015

It was apparently demolished before 2015.
