= Rabbit Hash, Kentucky =

Unincorporated community in Kentucky, United States

- Census-designated place (CDP)
- Official Name: Carlton (until December 1847)
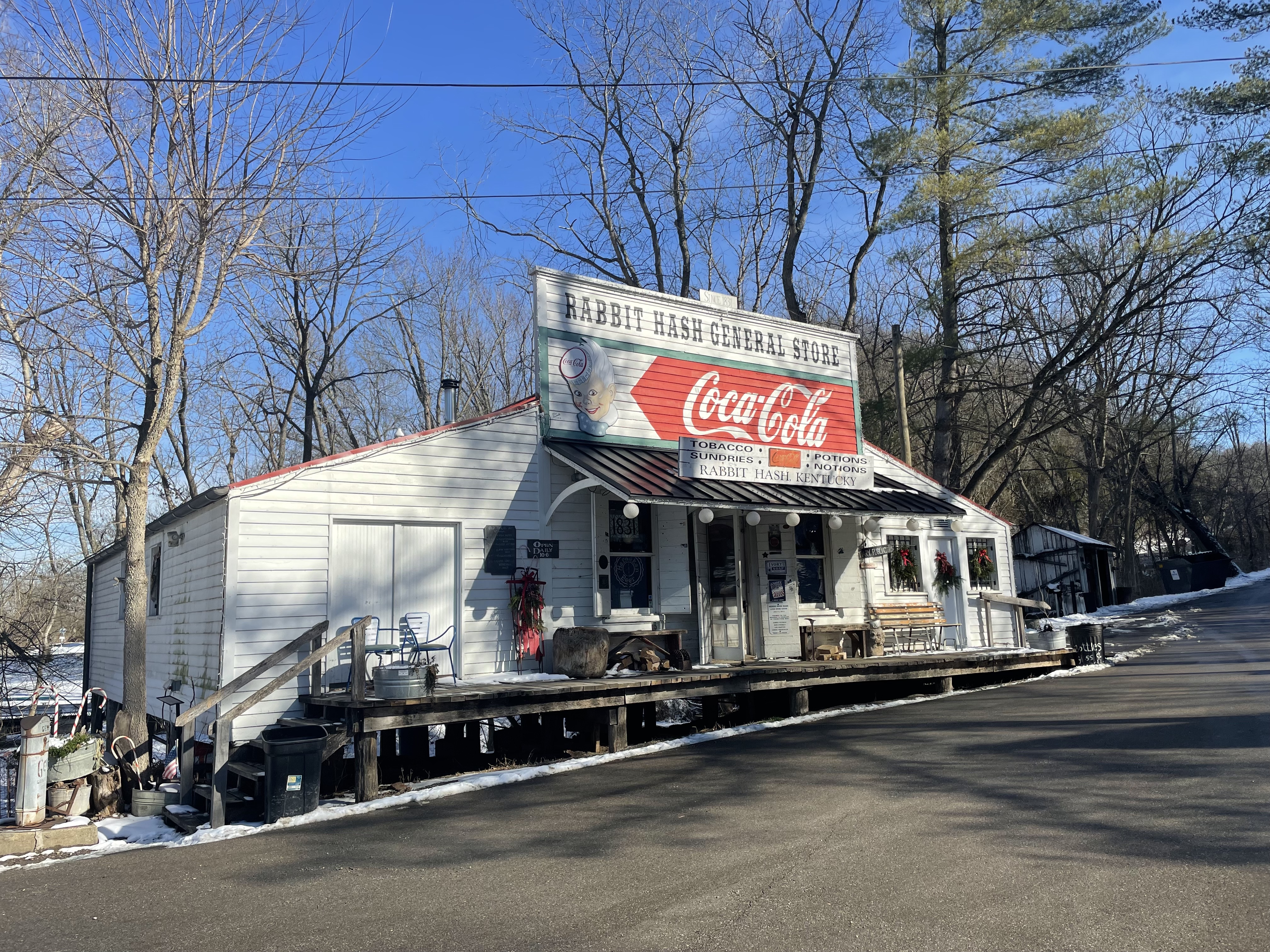
- Rabbit Hash General Store in late 2022.
- Nicknames: Carlton Voter Precinct, Rabbit Hash (official name since 1847)
- Motto: "Rabbit Hash Is Full Of Cash"
- Location within Boone County and the state of Kentucky
- Coordinates: 38°55′00″N 84°51′53″W
- Country: United States
- State: Kentucky
- County: Boone
- Established: 1800s

Area
  - Total: 6.93 sq mi (17.96 km^{2})
  - Land: 5.10 sq mi (13.21 km^{2})
  - Water: 1.83 sq mi (4.75 km^{2})
- Elevation: 525 ft (160 m)

Population (2020)
  - Total: 254
  - Density: 49.8/sq mi (19.22/km^{2})
- Time zone: UTC-5 (Eastern (EST))
  - Summer (DST): UTC-4 (EDT)
- ZIP codes: 41091, 41005
- Area code: 859
- FIPS code: 21-63804
- GNIS feature ID: 2629670

Rabbit Hash is an unincorporated community and census-designated place (CDP) in Boone County, Kentucky, United States. The population was 254 at the 2020 census. It is listed on the National Register of Historic Places. The town is notable for its name, its string of canine mayors, and its historic general store (c. 1831) which was largely destroyed by fire in 2016.

== Demographics ==
Historical population
Census	Pop.	Note	%±
2020	254		—
U.S. Decennial Census

== Origin of name ==
The hamlet was originally known as Carlton, but was required to change its name because mail was being mixed up with the larger community of Carrollton several miles down the Ohio River. The community is still referred to as the Carlton Voter Precinct.

The name Rabbit Hash may derive from the historic use of the local rabbit population as food. During the early 19th century the town was well known for a rabbit hash meal.

It is said that, in December 1847, the townsfolk were discussing what each family would be serving for their Christmas dinner. According to folklore, a man responded that he would be serving rabbit hash dinner. His response led to the other villagers nicknaming him "Rabbit Hash" as a joke. Eventually, the nickname became the known name of the village itself, with the steamboats on the nearby Ohio River stopping to order the famous hash referred to in the town's name.

== National Register of Historic Places ==
The hamlet's most notable building, the Rabbit Hash General Store (c. 1831), was regarded as "the best known and best-preserved country store in Kentucky". The store was added to the National Register of Historic Places on February 2, 1989.

The Rabbit Hash Historic District was added to the National Register of Historic Places on December 4, 2003. It includes 330 acres (1.3 km^{2}), 12 buildings, 6 structures, and 3 objects around 10021-10410 Lower River Road.

On February 13, 2016, the famous General Store was destroyed by a fire. According to the Belleview-McVille fire chief, the fire appeared to be accidental and was probably started by the old potbelly stove inside. The store's front sign and some larger pieces of merchandise were salvaged from the wreckage. Only three walls and the floor survived, but the original foundation was used to rebuild the store. The mayoral election in 2016 acted as a fundraiser, raising almost $9,000 to help with the restoration. It was restored and reopened on April 1, 2017, using a combination of original material and donor lumber from other period correct structures around the area, thereby allowing the store to maintain its historic designation.

== Canine mayors ==
The first elected mayor in Rabbit Hash history was an adopted dog "of unknown parentage" named Goofy Borneman-Calhoun, who was inaugurated in 1998 for a four-year term. His election was covered in the documentary Rabbit Hash (The Center of the Universe). He died in office in July 2001, aged 16.

The mayoralty remained unfilled until the next election, held in 2004, at which time Junior Cochran, a black Labrador, assumed office. Cochran came under the scrutiny of the Northern Kentucky Health Department and was banned from entering the town's General Store when a visitor complained about animals being inside the store. This ban upset many of Cochran's loyal supporters. According to a WXIX-TV report, on March 13, 2008, the dog's owner petitioned for an exemption for the "mayor." On May 30, 2008, WXIX-TV reported that Cochran had died in office at the age of 15.

On August 31, 2008 a special election was held to fill the vacancy left by the death of mayor Junior, and was won by Lucy Lou, a border collie, becoming the town's first female mayor. Mayor Lucy Lou shared a "Talking Points" walk with Bill Geist (CBS Sunday Morning), accepted a $1,000 stimulus check from Reader's Digest "We Hear You America Tour," served as grand marshall of the Covington Paw-Rade, appeared in a segment of The List, and has placed 3 years in a row in the Best Elected Official category in Cincinnati CityBeat magazine's Best Of Cincinnati issue (winning 1st place in 2013). On September 7, 2015, Mayor Lou's office announced that she was considering running for U.S. president, and is the first mayor not to die in office. Lucy Lou died on September 10, 2018, aged 12.

On November 8, 2016, a mayoral election took place in Rabbit Hash. Brynneth "Brynn" Pawltro, a pit bull, took first place, having raised $3,367. Bourbon, an Australian shepherd, came in second place, raising $2,336. Lady Stone, a border collie, came in third place, raising $1,621. Proceeds from the election went to the Rabbit Hash historical society to help restore the Rabbit Hash General store. In an unprecedented move, the Rabbit Hash Historical Society gave official positions to the 1st and 2nd runners-up, Bourbon and Lady Stone, as Ambassadors to Rabbit Hash. In the case that the official mayor is unavailable for an event or obligation, the ambassadors will fill in.

Wilbur Beast, a French bulldog, was elected mayor in November 2020 with 13,143 votes out of a total of 22,985. Jack Rabbit the Beagle, and Poppy the Golden Retriever came in second and third, making them both Rabbit Hash Ambassadors along with Ambassador Lady Stone, who will retain her position.

Boone, a Bluetick Coonhound, was elected as the mayor in November 2024 with 14,162 votes (the highest votes ever polled by a candidate and the largest total to date) out of the total of 26,332 votes polled. This was also the largest margin of victory, 8,853 (40%). Pablo and Ruby came in second and third, making them both Rabbit Hash Ambassadors.

List of mayors

#	Name	Term start	Term end
1	Goofy Borneman	1998	2001
2	Junior Cochran	2004	2008
3	Lucy Lou	2008	2016
4	Brynneth Pawltro	2016	2020
5	Wilbur Beast	2020	2024
6	Boone	2024	Incumbent

== Industry ==
The Duke Energy East Bend Generating Station coal-fired power plant is located in the southeastern part of the CDP.

== Notable people ==
Emma Bell Miles, a writer, poet, and artist, lived in Rabbit Hash in her early childhood.

== See also ==
- Non-human electoral candidates
