= Petersburg, Boone County, Kentucky =

Unincorporated community in Kentucky, United States

Petersburg, Kentucky
- Census-designated place (CDP)
- Location within Boone County and the state of Kentucky
- Coordinates: 39°03′11″N 84°51′26″W
- Country: United States
- State: Kentucky
- County: Boone

Area
  - Total: 7.02 sq mi (18.17 km^{2})
  - Land: 6.28 sq mi (16.26 km^{2})
  - Water: 0.74 sq mi (1.91 km^{2})
- Elevation: 522 ft (159 m)

Population (2020)
  - Total: 500
  - Density: 79.6/sq mi (30.75/km^{2})
- Time zone: UTC-5 (Eastern (EST))
  - Summer (DST): UTC-4 (EDT)
- ZIP codes: 41080
- FIPS code: 21-60312
- GNIS feature ID: 2629662

Petersburg is a rural unincorporated community and census-designated place (CDP) in Boone County, Kentucky, United States. As of the 2020 census Petersburg, along with its surrounding areas that use the 41080 zip code, had a population of 500. It is located on the Ohio River, 25 miles from Cincinnati, Ohio.

Archaeological evidence reveals an ancient Indian settlement was located at Petersburg town site. The first white settlement at Petersburg was Tanner's Station, an outpost founded before 1790. Tanner's station was the first settlement in Boone County, KY. Tanner's Station was renamed Petersburg in 1814.

The Bullittsburg Baptist Church was founded outside the former hamlets of Utzinger and Gainesville/Idewild, east and north of Petersburg, in 1794.

Petersburg contains the Creation Museum, operated by Answers in Genesis.

== Education ==
Petersburg has a public library, a branch of the Boone County Public Library.

== Demographics ==
Historical population
Census	Pop.	Note	%±
2020	500		—
U.S. Decennial Census

== Notable natives ==
- Charles Clinton Fleek, recipient of the Medal of Honor for service in the Vietnam War. "Chalky", as he was known, attended the old Petersburg Elementary School.

== See also ==
- Ronald Watson Gravel Site
