= New Alluwe, Oklahoma =

- Town
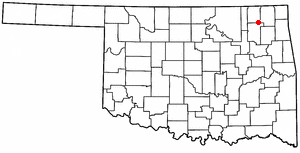
- Location of New Alluwe, Oklahoma
- Coordinates: 36°36′36″N 95°29′19″W
- Country: United States
- State: Oklahoma
- County: Nowata

Area
  - Total: 0.12 sq mi (0.30 km^{2})
  - Land: 0.12 sq mi (0.30 km^{2})
  - Water: 0 sq mi (0.00 km^{2})
- Elevation: 728 ft (222 m)

Population (2020)
  - Total: 89
  - Density: 769.8/sq mi (297.23/km^{2})
- Time zone: UTC-6 (Central (CST))
  - Summer (DST): UTC-5 (CDT)
- FIPS code: 40-51050
- GNIS feature ID: 2413041

New Alluwe is a town in Nowata County, Oklahoma, United States. As of the 2020 census, New Alluwe had a population of 89.

== History ==
Many of the first inhabitants came from the town of Alluwe after the U.S. Army Corps of Engineers constructed the Oologah Dam across the Verdigris River to form Oologah Lake in the 1950s. Alluwe is now a ghost town.

== Geography ==
In the middle twentieth century, New Alluwe was established at a site relocated from the construction of Oologah Lake. The old townsite now lies at the bottom of that lake.

According to the United States Census Bureau, the town has a total area of 0.1 square miles (0.26 km^{2}), all land.

== Demographics ==
Historical population
Census	Pop.	Note	%±
1970	116		—
1980	129		11.2%
1990	83		−35.7%
2000	95		14.5%
2010	90		−5.3%
2020	89		−1.1%
U.S. Decennial Census

=== 2020 census ===
As of the 2020 census, New Alluwe had a population of 89. The median age was 37.1 years. 21.3% of residents were under the age of 18 and 23.6% of residents were 65 years of age or older. For every 100 females there were 93.5 males, and for every 100 females age 18 and over there were 89.2 males age 18 and over.

0.0% of residents lived in urban areas, while 100.0% lived in rural areas.

There were 29 households in New Alluwe, of which 31.0% had children under the age of 18 living in them. Of all households, 51.7% were married-couple households, 20.7% were households with a male householder and no spouse or partner present, and 20.7% were households with a female householder and no spouse or partner present. About 24.1% of all households were made up of individuals and 6.9% had someone living alone who was 65 years of age or older.

There were 36 housing units, of which 19.4% were vacant. The homeowner vacancy rate was 7.4% and the rental vacancy rate was 37.5%.

Racial composition as of the 2020 census
Race	Number	Percent
White	59	66.3%
Black or African American	0	0.0%
American Indian and Alaska Native	19	21.3%
Asian	0	0.0%
Native Hawaiian and Other Pacific Islander	0	0.0%
Some other race	0	0.0%
Two or more races	11	12.4%
Hispanic or Latino (of any race)	3	3.4%

=== 2000 census ===
As of the census of 2000, there were 95 people, 35 households, and 29 families residing in the town. The population density was 816.6 inhabitants per square mile (315.3/km^{2}). There were 39 housing units at an average density of 335.2 per square mile (129.4/km^{2}). The racial makeup of the town was 53.68% White, 27.37% Native American, and 18.95% from two or more races.

There were 35 households, out of which 37.1% had children under the age of 18 living with them, 71.4% were married couples living together, 8.6% had a female householder with no husband present, and 14.3% were non-families. 14.3% of all households were made up of individuals, and 2.9% had someone living alone who was 65 years of age or older. The average household size was 2.71 and the average family size was 2.93.

In the town, the population was spread out, with 26.3% under the age of 18, 5.3% from 18 to 24, 21.1% from 25 to 44, 29.5% from 45 to 64, and 17.9% who were 65 years of age or older. The median age was 40 years. For every 100 females, there were 93.9 males. For every 100 females age 18 and over, there were 89.2 males.

The median income for a household in the town was $28,750, and the median income for a family was $30,000. Males had a median income of $23,750 versus $18,438 for females. The per capita income for the town was $9,918. There were 6.7% of families and 8.5% of the population living below the poverty line, including 7.9% of under eighteens and none of those over 64.
