= Alluwe, Oklahoma =

Ghost Town in Oklahoma, United States

Coordinates: 36°36′37″N 95°29′14″W

Alluwe is a ghost town in Nowata County, Oklahoma. The post office was established as Lightening Creek on October 23, 1872, after the namesake waterway. On June 27, 1883, the town was renamed Alluwe. The post office existed under this new name until July 31, 1909.

== History ==
Settled as a community by the Delaware Indians.

Oil was discovered in 1905.

In the 1950s the U.S. Army Corps of Engineers constructed the Oologah Dam across the Verdigris River to form Oologah Lake. The townsite was purchased by the government since it was within the Oologah Reservoir project area. Many residents moved a short distance eastward and formed New Alluwe.

Notable alumni of its local country school include Richard C. Adams, Lenape poet, attorney, and historian.

== See also ==
- New Alluwe
- List of ghost towns in Oklahoma
