= Richard C. Adams =

Lenape poet and legal representative (b. 1864, d. 1921)

Richard Calmit Adams
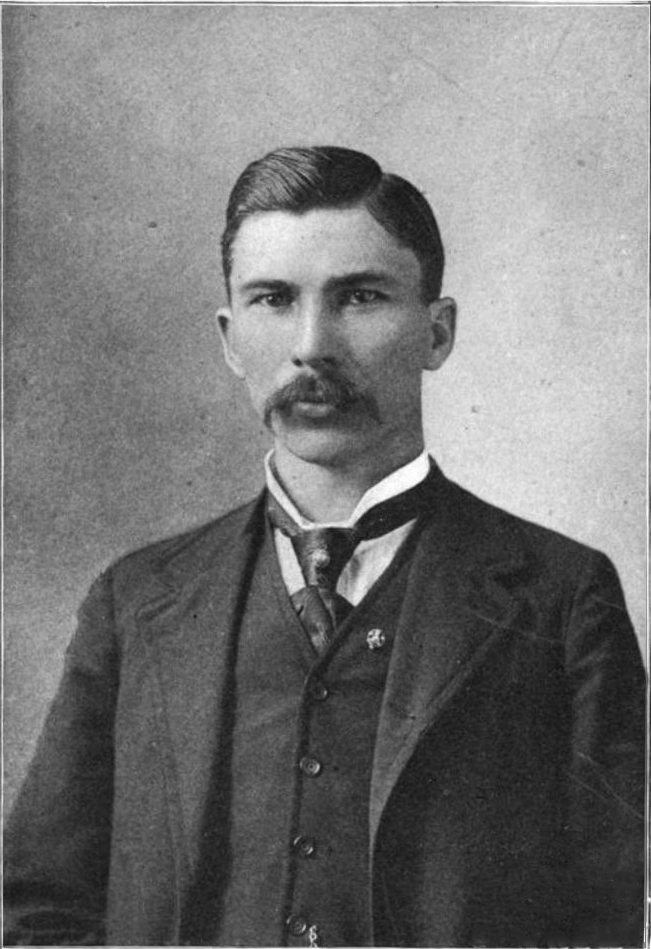
- Adams, 1899
- Born: August 23, 1864; Wyandotte County, Kansas
- Died: October 4, 1921 (aged 57); Washington, D.C.
- Writing career
- Language: English
- Genre: Political poetry

Signature
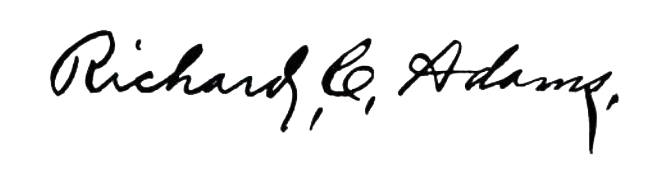

Richard Calmit Adams (August 23, 1864 - October 4, 1921), was an American poet, writer, attorney, entrepreneur, and cultural historian of the Delaware Tribe of Indians. As a Lenape poet and writer, he published five books collecting Delaware stories, history, religion, and modern political perspectives. In 1911, he founded intertribal American group, the Brotherhood of North American Indians.

From 1897 until his 1921 death, he legally represented the Delaware Tribe in Washington, D.C. Adams derided discriminatory laws and initiated bills to Congress to preserve Delaware land ownership, including mineral lease rights. He conducted a legal battle with the Cherokee Nation over land rights during the era of the Dawes Commission.

In 2002, Music of the United States of America describes Adams as the "first American Indian to publish transcriptions of native music in European notation."

His poetry expressed an "attitude of resistance toward Euramerican dominance," which may be considered "radical by early twentieth-century standards." It has also been described as "a moral plea to the American public...for [native people to achieve] the respect and equal human rights they deserve." Nearly all of his writing concludes with his signature and the phrase, "Representing the Delaware Indians."

Adams and his wife also founded the Adams Oil & Gas Company, an Oklahoma-based crude oil corporation.

== Life ==
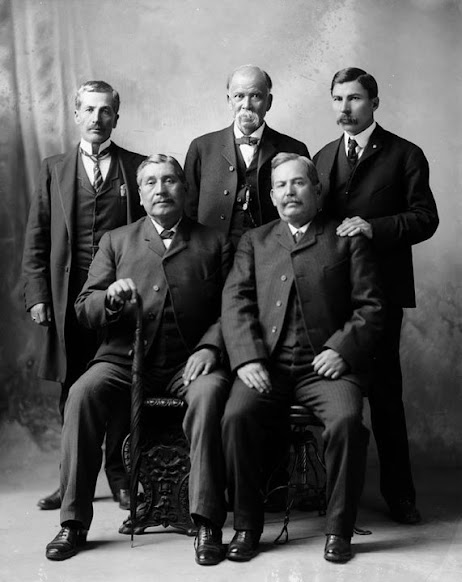
Adams (standing back right) with a group of people; others as yet unidentified.

Adams was born on August 23, 1864, in White Church Village in Wyandotte County, Kansas. The Delaware Indian settlement was named for a Methodist church mission established by missionary Thomas Johnson in 1832, which (after the state of Kansas became open to white people) attracted white settlers.

In 1869, Adams's family moved to Russell Creek in Indian Territory (now Oklahoma). From 1873 until 1880, he attended a country school in Alluwe, Indian Territory.

In 1904, he published The Ancient Religion of the Delaware Indians and Observations and Reflections with The Law Reporter Printing Co. in Washington, D.C. The following year, he published Legends of the Delaware Indians and Picture Writing.

In 1906, Indian Affairs chairman Moses E. Clapp of the 59th Congress presented Adams's Brief History of the Delaware Indians.

By 1906, Adams and his wife founded the Adams Oil & Gas Company.

Circa 1913, the Adams Oil & Gas Company was involved in a land dispute with the descendants of landowner William Vann of the Cherokee nation. F. R. Archer, allotting agent on the Quinaielt Reservation, testified that he had seen Adams and his son arranging oil leases on the reservation in the summer of 1913. He also stated that many members of the Quinalt people were part of Adams's organization, which was presumably the Brotherhood of North American Indians.

In 1917, he published The Adoption of Mew-Seu-Qua (Tecumseh's Father) and the Philosophy of the Delaware Indians with The Crane Printing Company in D.C.

By 1921, oil industry magazine Oildom listed Adams Oil & Gas Company as existing in Washington, D.C., and Indrio, Florida (beside Fort Pierce). A quarterly report described that it produced 486 barrels by January 1921.
