= Oologah, Oklahoma =

- Town
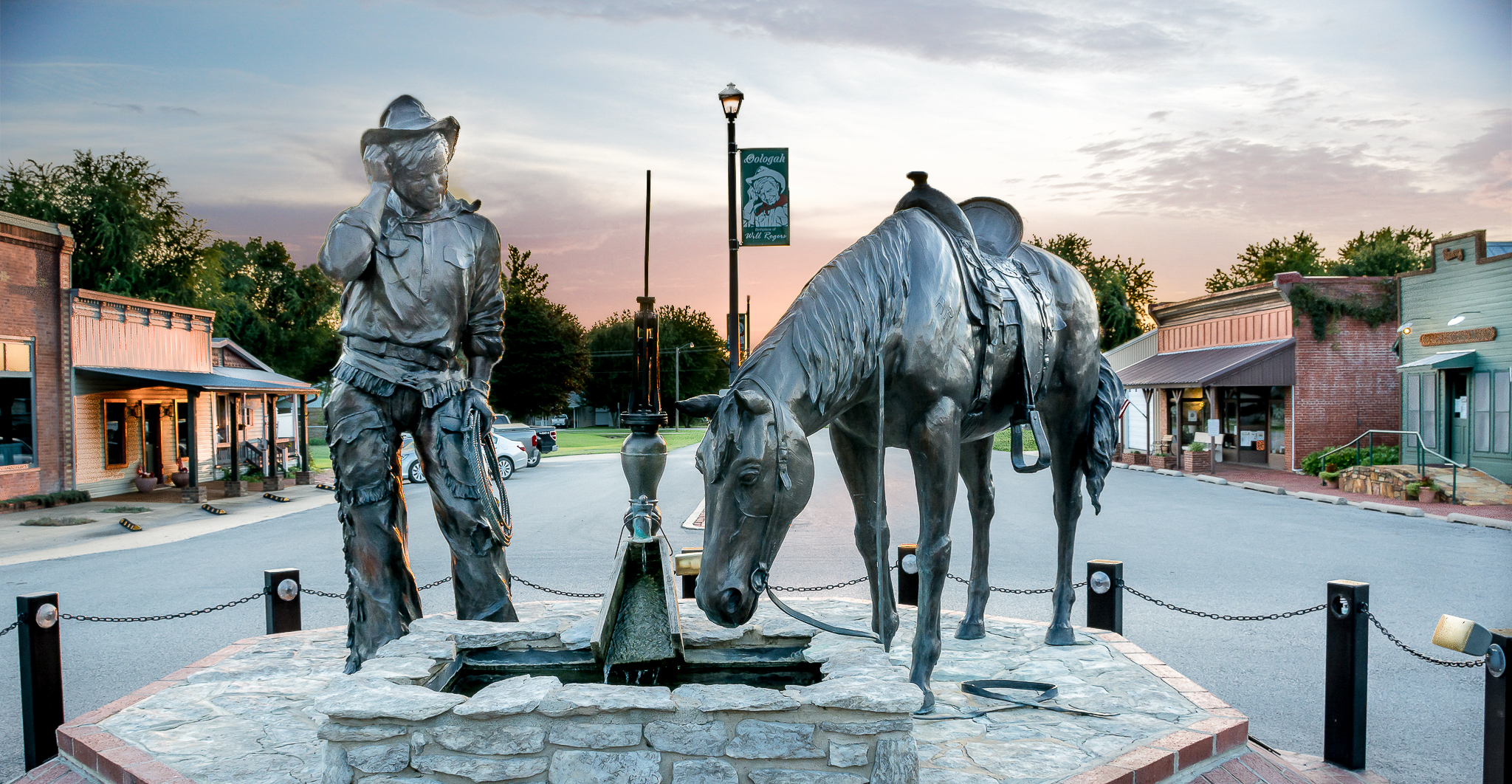

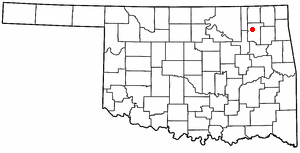
- Coordinates: 36°26′38″N 95°42′32″W
- Country: United States
- State: Oklahoma
- County: Rogers

Area
  - Total: 1.66 sq mi (4.31 km^{2})
  - Land: 1.66 sq mi (4.31 km^{2})
  - Water: 0 sq mi (0.00 km^{2})
- Elevation: 640 ft (200 m)

Population (2020)
  - Total: 1,305
  - Density: 785.1/sq mi (303.13/km^{2})
- Time zone: UTC-6 (Central (CST))
  - Summer (DST): UTC-5 (CDT)
- ZIP code: 74053
- Area codes: 539/918
- FIPS code: 40-55700
- GNIS feature ID: 2413081
- Website: https://www.townofoologah.org/

Oologah (/ˌuːləˈɡɑː/ OO-lə-GAH) is a town in Rogers County, Oklahoma, United States. As of the 2020 census, Oologah had a population of 1,305. Renowned humorist Will Rogers was born on a ranch two miles east of Oologah, although he usually claimed Claremore as his birthplace "because nobody but an Indian can pronounce 'Oologah.'" There has been disagreement about the town name's proper spelling. It was often spelled "Oolagah" before statehood, and this spelling appears on some old buildings.

== History ==
In 1889, the Kansas and Arkansas Valley Railway (later, the St. Louis, Iron Mountain and Southern Railway and subsequently part of the Missouri Pacific Railroad and now the Union Pacific Railroad) laid tracks through the area and established a townsite named Oologah, Indian Territory. Oologah was named for Oologah (Dark Cloud), a Cherokee chief. The Encyclopedia of Oklahoma History and Culture says that the Oklahoma Federal Writers' Project claimed the name means "red horse fish" in the Cherokee language, while other sources say it means "cloudy weather" or just "clouds". The post office opened on May 25, 1891.

Historical population
Census	Pop.	Note	%±
1900	308		—
1910	324		5.2%
1920	277		−14.5%
1930	263		−5.1%
1940	236		−10.3%
1950	242		2.5%
1960	299		23.6%
1970	458		53.2%
1980	798		74.2%
1990	828		3.8%
2000	883		6.6%
2010	1,146		29.8%
2020	1,193		4.1%

Early in the 20th century, the town flourished because of agriculture, coal mining, and oil and gas production, but these were hard hit during the Great Depression. The town's population declined from 324 in 1910 to 236 in 1940. The population had recovered to 299 in 1960. Construction of Oologah dam and lake in 1963, east of town, revitalized the town, which continues to grow.

In 1963, the Army Corps of Engineers completed the first phase of Oologah Lake.

On April 26, 1991, a destructive F4 tornado destroyed Oologah's north side, including the town's school. The tornado occurred as part of a major tornado outbreak that spanned across a majority of the Great Plains that day.

== Geography ==
According to the United States Census Bureau, the town has an area of 1.25 square miles (3.2 km^{2}), all land.

== Demographics ==
=== 2020 census ===
As of the 2020 census, Oologah had a population of 1,305. The median age was 34.2 years. 29.0% of residents were under the age of 18 and 11.7% of residents were 65 years of age or older. For every 100 females there were 94.5 males, and for every 100 females age 18 and over there were 87.3 males age 18 and over.

0.0% of residents lived in urban areas, while 100.0% lived in rural areas.

There were 498 households in Oologah, of which 42.0% had children under the age of 18 living in them. Of all households, 47.8% were married-couple households, 15.9% were households with a male householder and no spouse or partner present, and 29.9% were households with a female householder and no spouse or partner present. About 24.3% of all households were made up of individuals and 8.2% had someone living alone who was 65 years of age or older.

There were 541 housing units, of which 7.9% were vacant. The homeowner vacancy rate was 4.9% and the rental vacancy rate was 0.6%.

Racial composition as of the 2020 census
Race	Number	Percent
White	888	68.0%
Black or African American	4	0.3%
American Indian and Alaska Native	194	14.9%
Asian	11	0.8%
Native Hawaiian and Other Pacific Islander	0	0.0%
Some other race	9	0.7%
Two or more races	199	15.2%
Hispanic or Latino (of any race)	33	2.5%

=== 2000 census ===
As of the 2000 census, there were 342 households, out of which 42.1% had children under the age of 18 living with them, 52.0% were married couples living together, 18.4% had a female householder with no husband present, and 24.3% were non-families. 22.5% of all households were made up of individuals, and 9.6% had someone living alone who was 65 years of age or older. The average household size was 2.58 and the average family size was 3.03.

In the town, the population was spread out, with 31.6% under the age of 18, 8.6% from 18 to 24, 27.7% from 25 to 44, 22.1% from 45 to 64, and 10.0% who were 65 years of age or older. The median age was 33 years. For every 100 females, there were 89.9 males. For every 100 females age 18 and over, there were 84.1 males.

The median income for a household in the town was $33,977, and the median income for a family was $40,625. Males had a median income of $37,500 versus $25,000 for females. The per capita income for the town was $16,493. About 7.5% of families and 9.8% of the population were below the poverty line, including 14.7% of those under age 18 and 6.9% of those age 65 or over.

== Education ==
Oologah-Talala Public Schools has a 4A sized high school. The Oologah Lower Elementary is an "Oklahoma A+" school, recognized as one of seven schools statewide chosen for this honor.

The Oologah-Talala High School athletic program has gained the school recognition. In the 1990s, Oologah had the most successful class 3A football program in the state; the Mustangs were class 3A state champions in 1997 and 1998 and runners-up twice.

In March 2010, an outbreak of bacterial meningitis killed two students at Oologah-Talala Lower Elementary School.

== Oologah High School Sports Championships ==
Baseball

- 1996 Class 4A State Champions
- 2005 Class 4A State Champions

Basketball

- 1965 Class B Boys Basketball State Champions
- 1994 Class 3A 5-on-5 Girls Basketball State Champions

Football

- 1997 Class 3A State Champions
- 1998 Class 3A State Champions

Softball

- 1988 Class 4A Fast Pitch State Champions
- 1989 Class 3A Fast Pitch State Champions
- 1992 Class 3A Fast Pitch State Champions
- 1993 Class 3A Fast Pitch State Champions
- 1998 Class 3A Fast Pitch State Champions
- 1999 Class 4A Fast Pitch State Champions
- 2012 Class 4A Fast Pitch State Champions

Volleyball

- 1961 State Champions
- 1965 State Champions

Soccer

- 2024 Class 4A State Championship

== Notable people ==
- Zach Bryan – singer-songwriter
- Will Rogers (1879-1935) – political satirist born at Dog Iron Ranch just outside Oologah
