= Will Rogers =

Cherokee humorist and entertainer from Indian Territory, U.S. (1879–1935)

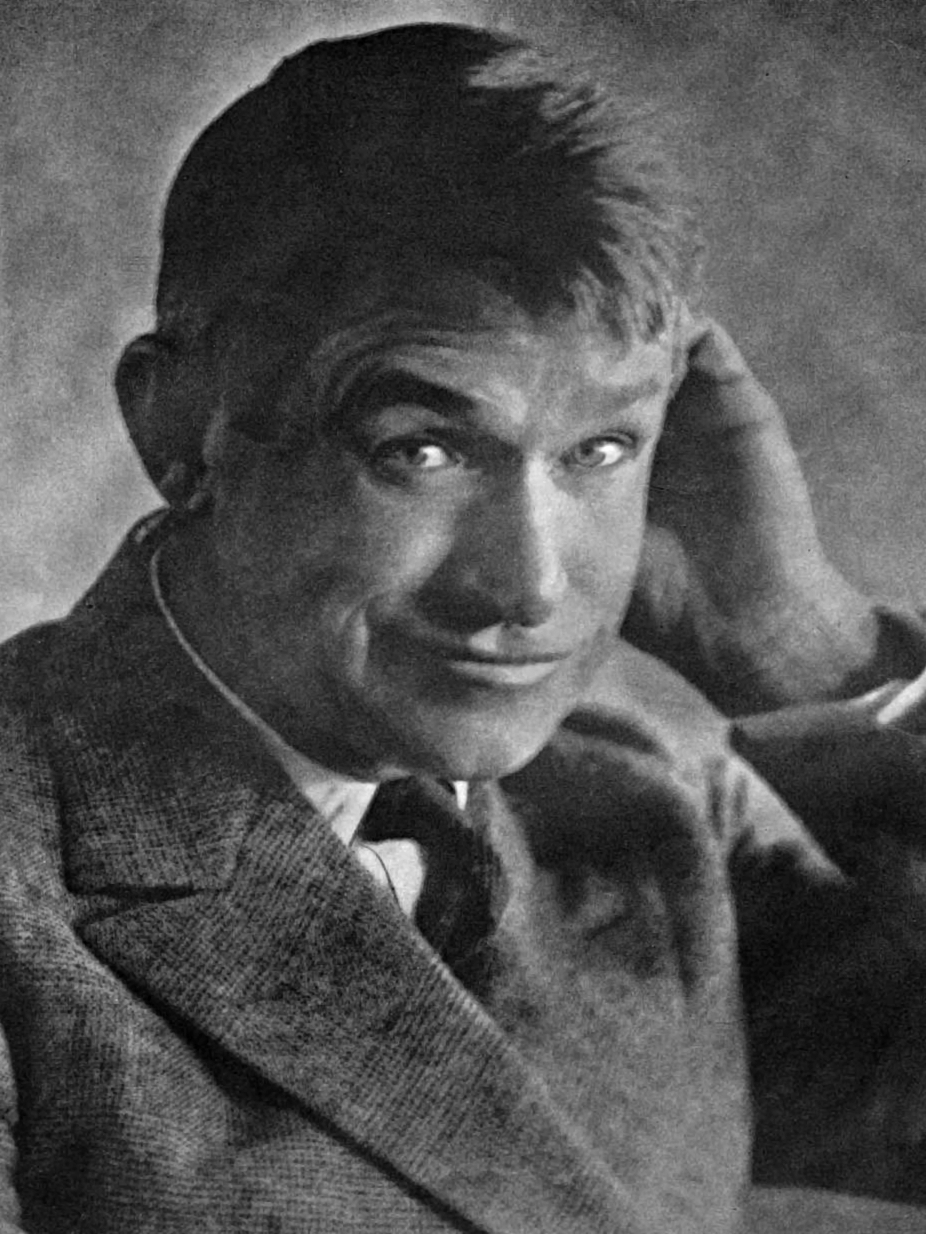
- Rogers in 1922

Honorary Mayor of Beverly Hills
- In office December 21, 1926 – December 23, 1926
- Preceded by: Silsby Spalding
- Succeeded by: Silsby Spalding

Personal details
- Born: William Penn Adair Rogers; November 4, 1879 near Oologah, Indian Territory
- Died: August 15, 1935 (aged 55) North Slope, Alaska Territory, U.S.
- Cause of death: Airplane crash
- Resting place: Will Rogers Memorial in Claremore, Oklahoma
- Citizenship: Cherokee Nation; United States
- Party: Democratic
- Spouse: Betty Blake (m. 1908)
- Children: Will Rogers Jr., Mary Amelia Rogers, James Blake Rogers, and Fred Stone Rogers
- Parent(s): Clement Vann Rogers and Mary America Schrimsher
- Occupation: Actor; vaudevillian; cowboy; columnist; humorist; radio personality
- Known for: State Fair; Judge Priest; Steamboat Round the Bend; Doctor Bull; Life Begins at 40; In Old Kentucky
- Awards: Hollywood Walk of Fame
- Nickname: "The Cherokee Kid"

William Penn Adair Rogers (November 4, 1879 – August 15, 1935) was a Cherokee-American vaudeville performer, actor, and humorist. He was born as a citizen of the Cherokee Nation, in the Indian Territory, now part of Oklahoma, and is known as "Oklahoma's Favorite Son". As an entertainer and humorist, he traveled around the world three times, made 71 films (50 silent films and 21 "talkies"), and wrote more than 4,000 nationally syndicated newspaper columns. By the mid-1930s, Rogers was hugely popular in the United States for his leading political wit and was one of the higher paid Hollywood film stars. He died in 1935 with aviator Wiley Post when their small airplane crashed on takeoff from a lagoon near Barrow, Alaska.

Rogers began his career as a performer in vaudeville. His rope act led to success in the Ziegfeld Follies, which in turn led to the first of his many movie contracts. His 1920s syndicated newspaper column and his radio appearances increased his visibility and popularity. Rogers crusaded for aviation expansion and provided Americans with first-hand accounts of his world travels. His earthy anecdotes and folksy style allowed him to poke fun at gangsters, prohibition, politicians, government programs, and a host of other controversial topics in a way that found general acclaim from a national audience with, usually, no one offended. His aphorisms, couched in humorous terms, were widely quoted, for example, "I am not a member of any organized political party. I am a Democrat."

One of Rogers's most famous sayings was "I never met a man I didn't like" and he even provided an epigram on this famous epigram:

When I die, my epitaph, or whatever you call those signs on gravestones, is going to read: "I joked about every prominent man of my time, but I never met a man I dident [sic] like." I am so proud of that, I can hardly wait to die so it can be carved.

== Early years ==
Rogers was born on his parents' Dog Iron Ranch in the Cherokee Nation of Indian Territory, near present-day Oologah, Oklahoma, now in Rogers County, named in honor of his father, Clement V. Rogers. The house in which he was born had been built in 1875 and was known as the "White House on the Verdigris River". His parents, Clement "Clem" V. Rogers (1839–1911) and Mary America Schrimsher (1838–1890), were both Cherokee with mixed ancestry, and were Cherokee Nation citizens. Rogers quipped that his ancestors did not come over on the Mayflower, but they "met the boat". His mother was one quarter-Cherokee and born into the Aniwodi, or "Paint Clan."

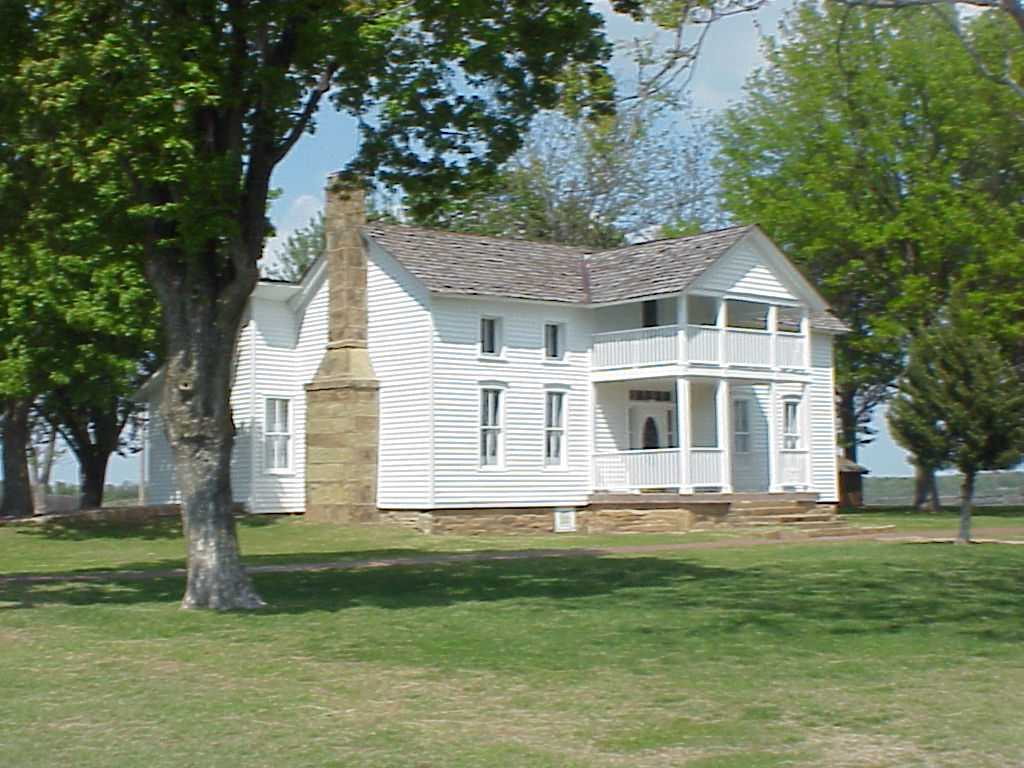
The White House on the Verdigris River, Will Rogers' birthplace, near Oologah, Oklahoma

Unlike his father's people, Mary's Cherokee relatives had been expelled from Georgia under the Indian Removal Act of 1830 in an exodus known as The Trail of Tears. Of the 16,000 Cherokees driven to Indian Territory (later Oklahoma), 4,000 perished en route. She died of amoebic dysentery when Will was 10 years of age. His father remarried in 1893 to Mary Almeda Bible, who died of complications following an unsuccessful appendicitis operation in 1900.

Rogers was the youngest of eight children. He was named for the Cherokee leader Colonel William Penn Adair. Only three of his siblings, sisters Sallie Clementine, Maude Ethel, and Mary (May), survived into adulthood.

His mother, Mary Schrimsher, was a sister of Martha Schrimsher Gulager, the paternal grandmother of Clu Gulager, making Rogers and Gulager first cousins, once removed.

His father, Clement, was a leader in the Cherokee Nation. An attorney and Cherokee judge, Clement owned two slaves he had acquired from his father, and was a Confederate combat veteran of the American Civil War. He was promoted to regimental captain under Confederate colonel (later Brigadier General) Stand Watie and fought at the Battle of Pea Ridge (1862).

Clement served as a delegate to the Oklahoma Constitutional Convention. Rogers County, Oklahoma, is named in honor of him. He served several terms in the Cherokee Senate.

Roach (1980) presents a sociological-psychological assessment of the relationship between Will and his father during the formative boyhood and teenage years. Clement had high expectations for his son and wanted him to be more responsible and business-minded. Will was more easygoing and oriented toward the loving affection offered by his mother, Mary, rather than the harshness of his father. The personality clash increased after his mother's death when the boy was ten. Young Will went from one venture to another with little success. Only after Will won acclaim in vaudeville did the rift begin to heal. Clement's death in 1911 precluded a full reconciliation.

Will Rogers attended school in Indian Territory, at the Willie Halsell College at Vinita in 1895 and 1896, and then the Kemper Military School at Boonville, Missouri, over the 1897–98 school year. He was a good student and an avid reader of The New York Times, but he dropped out of school after the 10th grade. Rogers later said that he was a poor student, saying that he "studied the Fourth Reader for ten years". He was much more interested in cowboys and horses, and learned to rope and use a lariat.

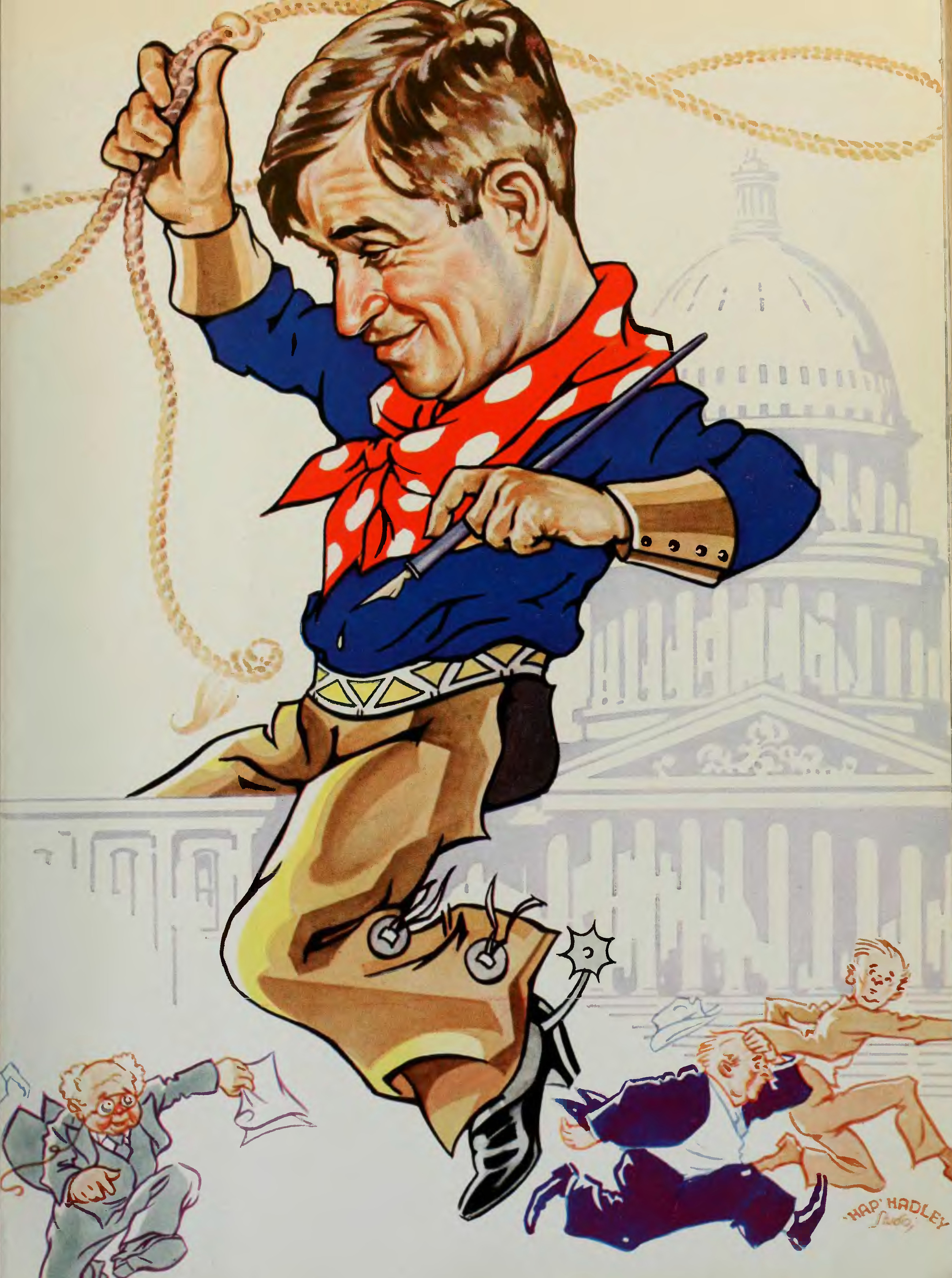
A Will Rogers caricature on a print advertisement for the film Down to Earth, from The Film Daily, 1932

=== First jobs ===
In 1899, Rogers appeared in the St. Louis Fair as part of the Mulhall Rodeo. Near the end of 1901, when he was 22 years old, he and a friend, Dick Parris, left home hoping to work as gauchos in Argentina. They arrived in Argentina in May 1902, and spent five months trying to make it as ranch owners in the Pampas. Rogers and his partner lost all their money, and he later said, "I was ashamed to send home for more." The two friends separated and Rogers sailed for South Africa. It is often claimed he took a job breaking in horses for the British Army, but the Boer War had ended three months earlier. Rogers was hired at James Piccione's ranch near Mooi River Station in the Pietermaritzburg district of Natal.

== Career ==
Rogers began his show business career as a trick roper in "Texas Jack's Wild West Circus" in South Africa:

He [Texas Jack] had a little Wild West aggregation that visited the camps and did a tremendous business. I did some roping and riding, and Jack, who was one of the smartest showmen I ever knew, took a great interest in me. It was he who gave me the idea for my original stage act with my pony. I learned a lot about the show business from him. He could do a bum act with a rope that an ordinary man couldn't get away with, and make the audience think it was great, so I used to study him by the hour, and from him I learned the great secret of the show business—knowing when to get off. It's the fellow who knows when to quit that the audience wants more of.

Grateful for the guidance but anxious to move on, Rogers quit the circus and went to Australia. Texas Jack gave him a reference letter for the Wirth Brothers Circus there, and Rogers continued to perform as a rider and trick roper, and worked on his pony act. He returned to the United States in 1904, appeared at the Saint Louis World's Fair, and began to try his roping skills on the vaudeville circuits.

=== Vaudeville ===
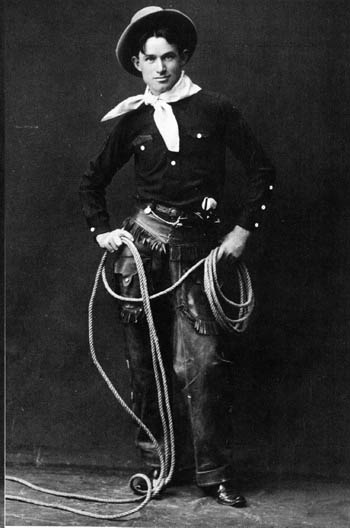
Rogers sometime before 1900

On a trip to New York City, Rogers was at Madison Square Garden, on April 27, 1905, when a wild steer broke out of the arena and began to climb into the viewing stands. Rogers roped the steer to the delight of the crowd. The feat got front page attention from the newspapers, giving him valuable publicity and an audience eager to see more. Willie Hammerstein saw his vaudeville act, and signed Rogers to appear on the Victoria Roof—which was literally on a rooftop—with his pony. For the next decade, Rogers estimated he worked for 50 weeks a year at the Roof and at the city's myriad vaudeville theaters.

Rogers later recalled these early years:

I got a job on Hammerstein's Roof at $140 a week for myself, my horse, and the man who looked after it. I remained on the roof for eight weeks, always getting another two-week extension when Willie Hammerstein would say to me after the Monday matinee, 'you're good for two weeks more'... Marty Shea, the booking agent for the Columbia, came to me and asked if I wanted to play burlesque. They could use an extra attraction....I told him I would think about it, but 'Burlesque' sounded to me then as something funny." Shea and Sam A. Scribner, the general manager of the Columbia Amusement Company, approached Rogers a few days later. Shea told Scribner Rogers was getting $150 and would take $175. "'What's he carrying?', Scribner asked Shea. 'Himself, a horse, and a man', answered Shea." Scribner replied, "'Give him eight weeks at $250'".

In the fall of 1915, Rogers began to appear in Florenz Ziegfeld's Midnight Frolic. The variety revue began at midnight in the top-floor night club of Ziegfeld's New Amsterdam Theatre, and drew many influential—and regular—customers. By this time, Rogers had refined his act. His monologues on the news of the day followed a similar routine every night. He appeared on stage in his cowboy outfit, nonchalantly twirling his lasso, and said, "Well, what shall I talk about? I ain't got anything funny to say. All I know is what I read in the papers." He would make jokes about what he had read in that day's newspapers. The line "All I know is what I read in the papers" is often incorrectly described as Rogers's most famous punch line, when it was his opening line.

His run at the New Amsterdam ran into 1916, and Rogers's growing popularity led to an engagement on the more famous Ziegfeld Follies. At this stage, Rogers's act was strictly physical, a silent display of daring riding and clever tricks with his lariat. He discovered that audiences identified the cowboy as the archetypical American—doubtless aided by Theodore Roosevelt's image as a cowboy. Rogers's cowboy was an unfettered man free of institutional restraints, with no bureaucrats to order his life. When he came back to the United States and worked in Wild West shows, he slowly began adding the occasional spoken ad lib, such as "Swingin' a rope's all right... if your neck ain't in it." Audiences responded to his laconic but pointed humor, and were just as fascinated by his frontier Oklahoma twang.

By 1916, Rogers was a featured star in Ziegfeld's Follies on Broadway, as he moved into satire by transforming the "Ropin' Fool" to the "Talkin' Fool". At one performance, with President Woodrow Wilson in the audience, Rogers improvised a "roast" of presidential policies that had Wilson, and the entire audience, in stitches and proved his remarkable skill at off-the-cuff, witty commentary on current events. He built the rest of his career around that skill.

A 1922 editorial in The New York Times said that "Will Rogers in the Follies is carrying on the tradition of Aristophanes, and not unworthily." Rogers branched into silent films too, for Samuel Goldwyn's company Goldwyn Pictures. He made his first silent movie, Laughing Bill Hyde (1918), which was filmed in Fort Lee, New Jersey. Many early films were filmed and produced in the New York area in those years. Rogers could make a film, yet easily still rehearse and perform in the Follies. He eventually appeared in most of the Follies, from 1916 to 1925.

=== Films ===
Hollywood discovered Rogers in 1918, as Samuel Goldwyn gave him the title role in Laughing Bill Hyde.

A three-year contract with Goldwyn, at triple the Broadway salary, moved Rogers west. He bought a ranch in the Pacific Palisades and set up his own production company. While Rogers enjoyed film acting, his appearances in silent movies suffered from the obvious restrictions of silence, as he had gained his fame as a commentator on stage. He wrote many of the title cards appearing in his films. In 1923, he began a one-year stint for Hal Roach and made 12 pictures. Among the films he made for Roach in 1924 were three directed by Rob Wagner: Two Wagons Both Covered, Going to Congress, and Our Congressman. He made two other feature silents and a travelogue series in 1927. After that, he did not return to the screen until beginning work in the 'talkies' in 1929.

Rogers made 48 silent movies, but with the arrival of sound in 1929, he became a top star in that medium. His first sound film, They Had to See Paris (1929), gave him the chance to exercise his verbal wit.

He played a homespun farmer (State Fair) in 1933, an old-fashioned doctor (Dr. Bull) in 1933, a small town banker (David Harum) in 1934, and a rustic politician (Judge Priest) in 1934. He was also in County Chairman (1935), Steamboat Round the Bend (1935), and In Old Kentucky (1935). His favorite director was John Ford.

Rogers appeared in 21 feature films alongside such noted performers as Lew Ayres, Billie Burke, Jane Darwell, Andy Devine, Janet Gaynor, Boris Karloff, Myrna Loy, Joel McCrea, Hattie McDaniel, Ray Milland, Maureen O'Sullivan, ZaSu Pitts, Dick Powell, Bill "Bojangles" Robinson, and Mickey Rooney. He was directed three times by John Ford. He appeared in four films with his friend Stepin Fetchit (aka Lincoln T. Perry): David Harum (1934), Judge Priest (1934), Steamboat Round the Bend (1935) and The County Chairman (1935).

With his voice becoming increasingly familiar to audiences, Rogers essentially played himself in each film, without film makeup, managing to ad-lib and sometimes work in his familiar commentaries on politics. The clean moral tone of his films resulted in various public schools taking their classes to attend special showings during the school day. His most unusual role may have been in the first talking version of Mark Twain's novel A Connecticut Yankee in King Arthur's Court. His popularity soared to new heights with films including Young As You Feel, Judge Priest, and Life Begins at 40, with Richard Cromwell and Rochelle Hudson.

=== Newspapers and magazines ===
Rogers was an indefatigable worker. He toured the lecture circuit. The New York Times syndicated his weekly newspaper column from 1922 to 1935. Going daily in 1926, his short column "Will Rogers Says" reached 40 million newspaper readers. He also wrote frequently for the mass-circulation upscale magazine The Saturday Evening Post. Rogers advised Americans to embrace the frontier values of neighborliness and democracy on the domestic front, while remaining clear of foreign entanglements. He took a strong, highly popular stand in favor of aviation, including a military air force of the sort his flying buddy General Billy Mitchell advocated.

Rogers began a weekly column, titled "Slipping the Lariat Over", at the end of 1922. He had already published a book of wisecracks and had begun a steady stream of humor books. Through the columns for the McNaught Syndicate between 1922 and 1935, as well as his personal appearances and radio broadcasts, he won the admiration of the American people, poking jibes in witty ways at the issues of the day and prominent people—often politicians. He wrote from a nonpartisan point of view and became a friend of presidents and a confidant of the great.

Loved for his cool mind and warm heart, he was often considered the successor to such greats as Artemus Ward and Mark Twain. Rogers was not the first entertainer to use political humor before his audience. Others, such as Broadway comedian Raymond Hitchcock and Britain's Sir Harry Lauder, preceded him by several years. Bob Hope is the best known political humorist to follow Rogers's example.

=== Radio ===
Radio was the exciting new medium, and Rogers became a star there as well, broadcasting his newspaper pieces. From 1929 to 1935, he made radio broadcasts for the Gulf Oil Company. This weekly Sunday evening show, The Gulf Headliners, ranked among the top radio programs in the country. Since Rogers easily rambled from one subject to another, reacting to his studio audience, he often lost track of the half-hour time limit in his earliest broadcasts, and was cut off in mid-sentence. To correct this, he brought in a wind-up alarm clock, and its on-air buzzing alerted him to begin wrapping up his comments. By 1935, his show was being announced as "Will Rogers and his Famous Alarm Clock".

==== Controversy over racial slurs ====
In 1934, while introducing the song "The Last Round-Up" on the January 21 Gulf Oil program, Rogers commented that, "The words to the song are cowboy all right, but the tune is really a 'nigger' spiritual." He continued to use the offensive racial slur several more times in the program.

Telephone calls and telegrams of protest immediately poured into the radio station and Gulf Oil headquarters in Pittsburgh, Pennsylvania. The nationwide Black press quickly began to call for a boycott against Gulf stations, Will Rogers films, and theaters that showed them, and the NAACP called for a public apology. In an editorial reprinted around the country, The Philadelphia Tribune stated, ‘Will Rogers, by using a certain insulting epithet in referring to Negroes, offers an opportunity for colored Americans to prove to American business that it cannot insult them and get away with it."

Both Gulf Oil and NBC refused to take any action condemning Rogers, citing protections of freedom of speech. Rogers further compounded the issue the following week when, in an apparent ham-handed effort to apologize, he used the derogatory term "darkies" several times.

Nearly two months later, Rogers eventually issued a defensive and qualified apology, in the form of a letter to civil rights activist Channing Tobias published in Black newspapers around the country. Claiming that in using the epithet he was "trying to pay a most deserved tribute to the art of the race" Rogers continued,

"I think you folks are wrong in jumping too hastily onto someone or anyone who might use the word with no more thought or belittlement than I did. There is millions in the South who use that word, and if the race has more real friends among millions of people down there I don’t know where it is. I am offering no excuse for using it myself, I was wrong, but its the intention and not the wording that you must look for. What in the world, what particle of action had ever lead a single Negro to believe that I hadn't the best wishes toward their race?"

Rogers closed his letter with the recommendation that the Black press "must also use tolerance toward millions of fine white people who use the word but who at heart are really friends."

== Personal life ==
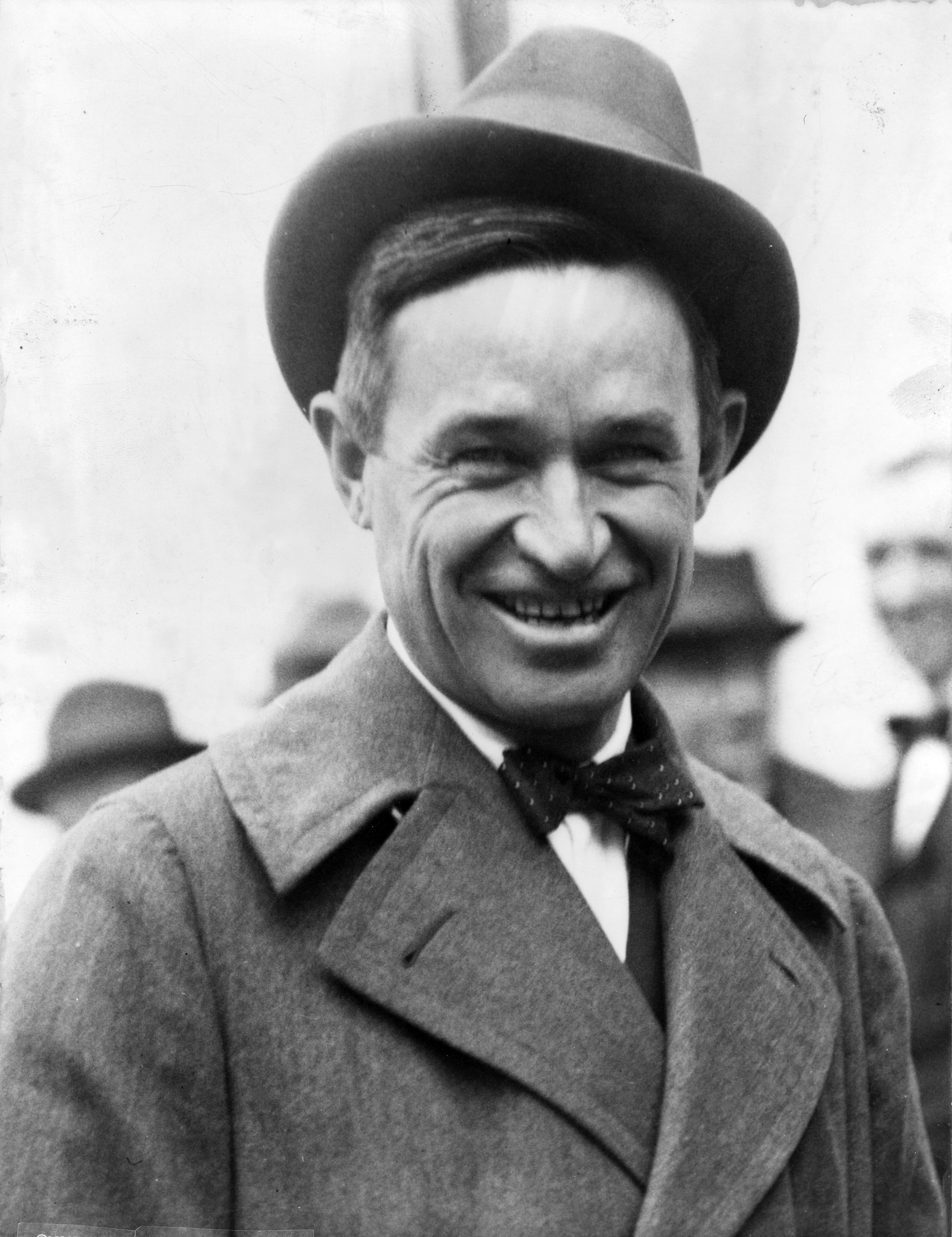
Photograph by Underwood & Underwood, unknown date

In 1908, Rogers married Betty Blake (1879–1944), and the couple had four children: Will Rogers Jr., Mary Amelia, James Blake, and Fred Stone. Will Jr. became a World War II hero, played his father in two films, and was elected to Congress. Mary became a Broadway actress, and James "Jim" was a newspaperman and rancher; Fred died of diphtheria at age two. The family lived in New York, but they spent summers in Oklahoma. In 1911, Rogers bought a 20-acre (8.1 ha) ranch near Claremore, Oklahoma, which he intended to use as his retirement home. He paid US$500 an acre, equal to $17,277 per acre today.

From about 1925 to 1928, Rogers traveled the length and breadth of the United States in a "lecture tour". He began his lectures by pointing out that "A humorist entertains, and a lecturer annoys." During this time he became the first civilian to fly from coast to coast with pilots flying the mail in early air mail flights. The National Press Club dubbed him "Ambassador at Large of the United States". He visited Mexico City, along with Charles Lindbergh, as a guest of U.S. Ambassador Dwight Morrow. Rogers gave numerous after-dinner speeches, became a popular convention speaker, and gave dozens of benefits for victims of floods, droughts, or earthquakes.

Rogers traveled to Asia and Latin America to perform in 1931. In 1934, he made a globe-girdling tour and returned to play the lead in Eugene O'Neill's stage play Ah, Wilderness!. He had tentatively agreed to go on loan from Fox to MGM to star in the 1935 movie version of the play. But, concerned about a fan's reaction to the "facts-of-life" talk between his character and the latter's son, he declined the role. He and Wiley Post made plans to fly to Alaska that summer.

== Politics ==
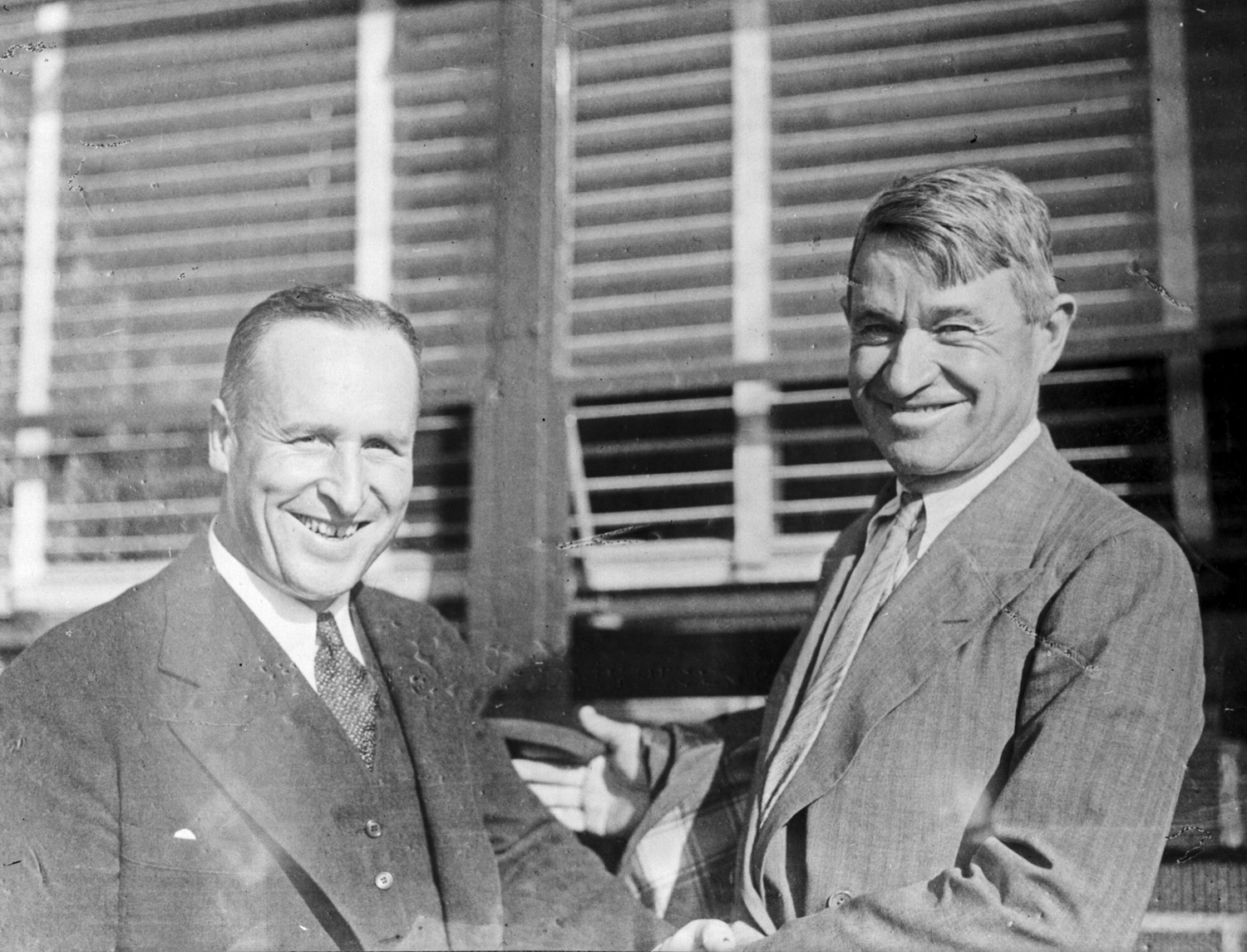
Rogers (right) with Seattle Mayor Charles L. Smith about 1935

Rogers was a lifelong Democrat but has historically been known as apolitical. Although some historians have argued his writings were always political, typically isolationist and critical of American imperialism. Historian Daniel Burge cites Rogers opposition to the Pancho Villa Expedition, intervention in the Chinese Civil War, the United States occupation of the Philippines, and intervention in the Nicaraguan Civil War as examples of his foreign policy.

He was friends with every president starting with Theodore Roosevelt, and he notably supported Republican Calvin Coolidge over John W. Davis in 1924. During the Republican Convention of 1928, while criticizing the party platform, Rogers welcomed the nomination of Kaw citizen Charles Curtis as vice president, although he felt the leadership had deliberately kept him from the presidency: "The Republican Party owed him something, but I didn't think they would be so low down as to pay him that way."

In 1932, when the Republican leadership attempted to remove the more conservative Curtis from the Hoover ticket, Rogers defended him, and took credit for keeping him on the ticket: "I saved my 'Injun' Charley Curtis for vice presidency. The rascals was just ready to stab him when we caught 'em."

In 1932, Rogers supported Democrat Franklin D. Roosevelt, who was his favorite president and politician. Although he supported Roosevelt's New Deal, he could just as easily joke about it: "Lord, the money we do spend on Government and it's not one bit better than the government we got for one-third the money twenty years ago."

Rogers served as a goodwill ambassador to Mexico, and had a brief stint as mayor of Beverly Hills, a largely ceremonial position that allowed Rogers to joke about do-nothing politicians such as himself. During the depths of the Great Depression, angered by Washington's inability to feed the people, he embarked on a cross-country fundraising tour for the Red Cross.

=== 1928 presidential campaign ===
Rogers thought all campaigning was "bunk." To prove the point, he mounted a mock campaign in 1928 for the presidency. His only vehicle was Life, which was then a weekly humor magazine. The campaign was in large part an effort to boost circulation for the struggling periodical. Rogers ran as the "bunkless candidate" of the Anti-Bunk Party. His campaign promise was that, if elected, he would resign. Every week, from Memorial Day through Election Day, Rogers caricatured campaign politics. On Election Day he declared victory and resigned (he did not actually receive any state electoral votes).

Asked what issues would motivate voters? Prohibition: "What's on your hip is bound to be on your mind" (July 26).

Asked if there should be presidential debates? Yes: "Joint debate—in any joint you name" (August 9).

How about appeals to the common man? Easy: "You can't make any commoner appeal than I can" (August 16).

What does the farmer need? Obvious: "He needs a punch in the jaw if he believes that either of the parties cares a damn about him after the election" (August 23).

Can voters be fooled? Darn tootin': "Of all the bunk handed out during a campaign the biggest one of all is to try and compliment the knowledge of the voter" (September 21).

What about a candidate's image? Ballyhoo: "I hope there is some sane people who will appreciate dignity and not showmanship in their choice for the presidency" (October 5).

What of ugly campaign rumors? Don't worry: "The things they whisper aren't as bad as what they say out loud" (October 12).

== Philosophy and style ==
After Rogers gained recognition as a humorist-philosopher in vaudeville, he gained a national audience in acting and literary careers from 1915 to 1935. In these years, Rogers increasingly expressed the views of the "common man" in America. He downplayed academic credentials, noting, "Everybody is ignorant, only on different subjects." Americans of all walks admired his individualism, his appreciation for democratic ideas, and his liberal philosophies on most issues. Rogers extolled hard work in order to succeed, and such expressions affirmed American theories about how to realize individual success. Rogers symbolized the self-made man, the common man, who believed in America, in progress, and in the American Dream of upward mobility. His humor never offended even those who were the targets of it.

In the 1920s, the United States was happy and prosperous in various ways, leading to the nickname Roaring Twenties, but it also suffered from rapid change and social tensions. Some people were disenchanted by, and alienated from, the outside world. Many common people believed that World War I had resulted in extensive and largely senseless carnage, and they supported isolationism for the US. According to scholar Peter Rollins (1976), Rogers appeared to be an anchor of stability. His conventional home life and traditional moral code reminded people of a recent past.

His newspaper column, which ran from 1922 to 1935, expressed his traditional morality and his belief that political problems were not as serious as they sounded. In his films, Rogers began by playing a simple cowboy; his characters evolved to explore the meaning of innocence in ordinary life. In his last movies, Rogers explores a society fracturing into competing classes from economic pressures. Throughout his career, Rogers was a link to a better, more comprehensible past.

In 1926, the high-circulation weekly magazine The Saturday Evening Post financed a European tour for Rogers, in return for publication of his articles. Rogers made whirlwind visits to numerous European capitals and met with both international figures and common people. His articles reflected a fear that Europeans would go to war again. He recommended isolationism for the United States. He reasoned that for the moment, American needs could best be served by concentrating on domestic questions and avoiding foreign entanglements. He commented:

America has a unique record. We never lost a war and we never won a conference in our lives. I believe that we could without any degree of egotism, single-handed lick any nation in the world. But we can't confer with Costa Rica and come home with our shirts on.

"Rogers' philosophy was reactionary, dispiriting and provincial, despite every affectation of bonhomie and tolerance. It scorned ideas and the people who held them, it relied on vague evolution rather than direct action, its fixed smile concealed rigidity of opinion that middle America need not be disturbed from its own prejudices and limitations."—Film critic David Thomson in A Biographical History of Film (1976)

Rogers was famous for his use of language. He effectively used up-to-date slang and invented new words to fit his needs. He also made frequent use of puns and terms which closely linked him to the cowboy tradition, as well as speech patterns using a southern dialect.

Brown (1979) argues that Rogers held up a "magic mirror" that reflected iconic American values. Rogers was the archetypical "American Democrat" thanks to his knack of moving freely among all social classes, his stance above political parties, and his passion for fair play. He represented the "American Adam" with his independence and self-made record. Rogers furthermore represented the "American Prometheus" through his commitment to utilitarian methods and his ever-optimistic faith in future progress.

== Aviation and death ==
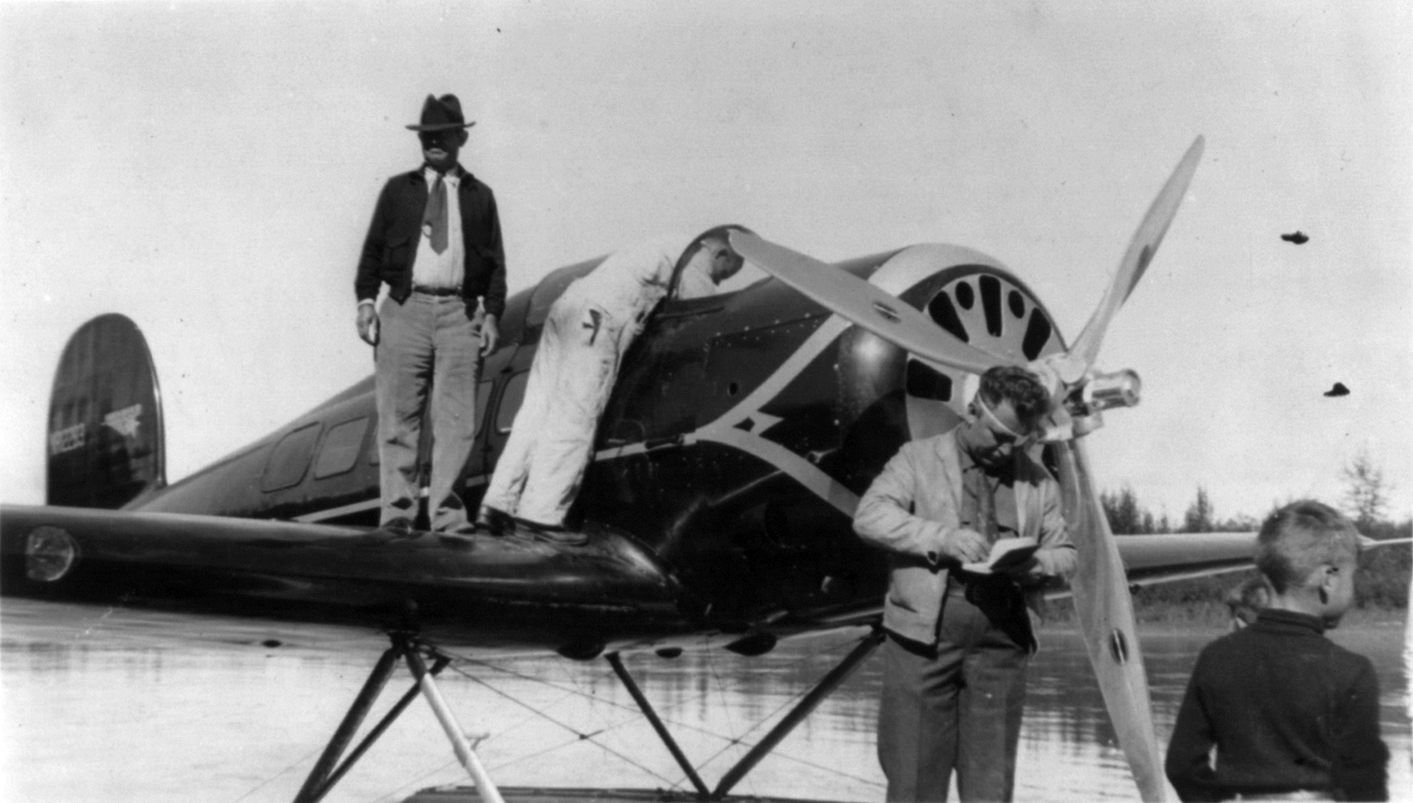
Rogers on the wing of a Lockheed floatplane belonging to famed aviation pioneer Wiley Post, hours before their fatal crash on August 15, 1935

Will Rogers became an advocate for the aviation industry after noticing advances in Europe and befriending Charles Lindbergh, the most famous American aviator of the era. During his 1926 European trip, Rogers witnessed the European advances in commercial air service and compared them to the almost non-existent facilities in the United States. Rogers' newspaper columns frequently emphasized the safety record, speed, and convenience of this means of transportation, and he helped shape public opinion on the subject.

In 1935, the famed aviator Wiley Post, an Oklahoman, became interested in surveying a mail-and-passenger air route from the West Coast to Russia. He attached a Lockheed Explorer wing to a Lockheed Orion fuselage, fitting floats for landing in the lakes of Alaska and Siberia. Rogers visited Post often at the airport in Burbank, California, while he was modifying the aircraft. He asked Post to fly him through Alaska in search of new material for his newspaper column.

After making a test flight in July, Post and Rogers left Lake Washington in Renton, Washington, in the Lockheed Orion-Explorer in early August and then made several stops in Alaska. While Post piloted the aircraft, Rogers wrote his columns on his typewriter. Before they left Fairbanks, they signed and mailed a burgee, a distinguishing flag belonging to the South Coast Corinthian Yacht Club. The signed burgee is on display at South Coast Corinthian Yacht Club in Marina del Rey, California. On August 15, they left Fairbanks for Utqiaġvik (formerly Barrow).

About 20 miles southwest of Utqiaġvik, having difficulty figuring their position due to bad weather, they landed in a lagoon to ask directions. On takeoff, the engine failed at low altitude, and the aircraft plunged into the lagoon, shearing off the right wing, and ended up inverted in the shallow water of the lagoon. Both men died instantly. Rogers was buried August 21, 1935, in Forest Lawn Memorial Park in Glendale, California. He was re-interred at the Will Rogers Memorial in Claremore, Oklahoma, in 1944.

Experts have studied the accident and still disagree about its cause. Bobby H. Johnson and R. Stanley Mohler argued in a 1971 article that Post had ordered floats that did not reach Seattle in time for the planned trip. He used a set that was designed for a larger type of plane, making the already nose-heavy hybrid aircraft even more nose-heavy. But Bryan and Frances Sterling maintain in their 2001 book Forgotten Eagle: Wiley Post: America's Heroic Aviation Pioneer that their research showed the floats were the correct type for the aircraft, thereby suggesting another cause for the crash.

== Legacy ==
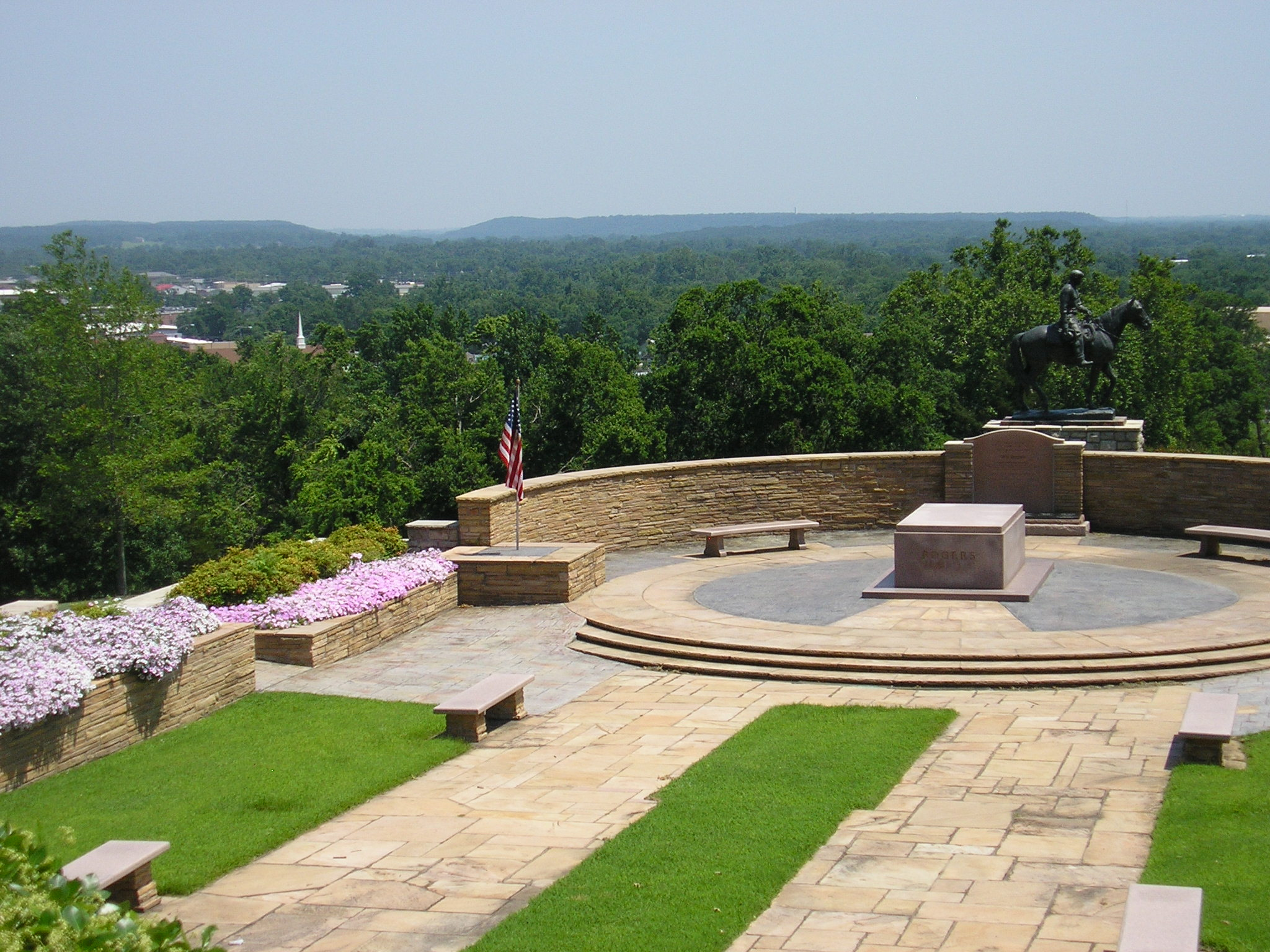
Will Rogers' tomb, viewed from the Will Rogers Memorial in Claremore, Oklahoma

In 1962, the town of Higgins, Texas, (near a ranch where Rogers had worked in 1922), began an annual observance of Will Rogers Day, in honor of the cowboy philosopher, who remained a close friend of Frank Ewing, the son of his old employer.

Rogers was posthumously inducted into the National Aviation Hall of Fame in Dayton, Ohio.

The Tulsa World newspaper includes a quote from Rogers daily in its "Will Rogers Says" column.

=== Oklahoma honors ===
Before his death, the state of Oklahoma commissioned a statue of Rogers, to be displayed as one of the two it has in the National Statuary Hall Collection of the United States Capitol. Rogers agreed on the condition that his image would be placed facing the House Chamber, supposedly so he could "keep an eye on Congress". Of the statues in this part of the Capitol, the Rogers sculpture is the only one facing the Chamber entrance—a stakeout location for camera crews looking to catch House members during and after voting. It is also a common background for reporters and lawmakers, with staff often directing the media to be at the "Will Rogers stakeout" at a certain time. According to some Capitol guides, each U.S. president rubs the left shoe of the Rogers statue for good luck before entering the House Chamber to give the State of the Union address.

A state appropriation paid for the work. It was sculpted in clay by Jo Davidson. He had been a close friend of Rogers. Davidson had the work cast in bronze in Brussels, Belgium. It was dedicated on June 6, 1939, before a crowd of more than 2,000 people. The Architect of the Capitol, David Lynn, said there had never been such a large ceremony or crowd in the Capitol.

His birthplace at the Dog Iron Ranch is located two miles east of Oologah, Oklahoma. When the Verdigris River valley was flooded to create Oologah Lake as part of a major dam project, the Rogers house was preserved by moving it about 3/4 mile (1.2 km) to its present location overlooking the original site.

The family tomb is at the Will Rogers Memorial Museum, constructed in nearby Claremore on the site purchased by Rogers in 1911 for his retirement home. On May 19, 1944, Rogers's body was moved from a holding vault in Glendale, California, to the tomb. After his wife Betty died later that year, she was also interred there. A casting of the Davidson sculpture that stands in National Statuary Hall, paid for by Davidson, was installed at the museum. Both the birthplace and the museum are open to the public.

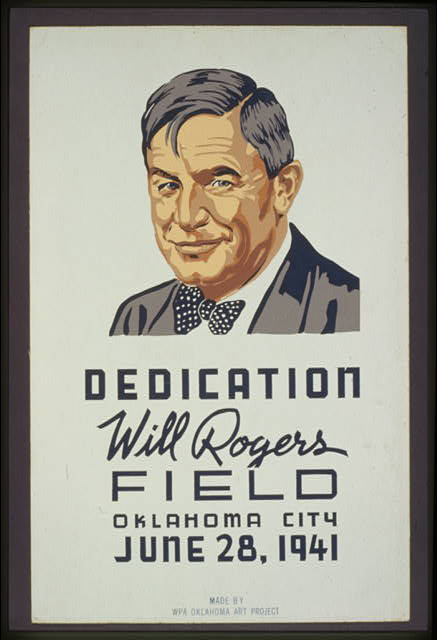
A WPA poster, 1941

Many landmarks were named in Rogers' honor: Will Rogers World Airport in Oklahoma City, where a recent expansion and renovation included the installation of a statue of Rogers on horseback in front of the terminal. The Will Rogers Turnpike is the section of Interstate 44 between Tulsa and Joplin, Missouri. Near Vinita, Oklahoma, a statue of Rogers was installed at the service plaza that spans the interstate.

Thirteen public schools in Oklahoma have been named for Rogers, including Will Rogers High School in Tulsa. The University of Oklahoma named the large Will Rogers Room in the student union for him. The Boy Scouts of America honored him with the Will Rogers Council and the Will Rogers Scout Reservation near Cleveland, Oklahoma.

In 1947, a college football bowl game was named in his honor, but the event folded after the first year.

In Oklahoma City, a very high frequency Omni-range/TACAN (VORTAC) station used for aircraft navigation is named after Will Rogers with the identifier IRW.

The Academy of Western Artists, based in Gene Autry, Oklahoma, presents an annual Will Rogers Medallion award for excellence in western literature.

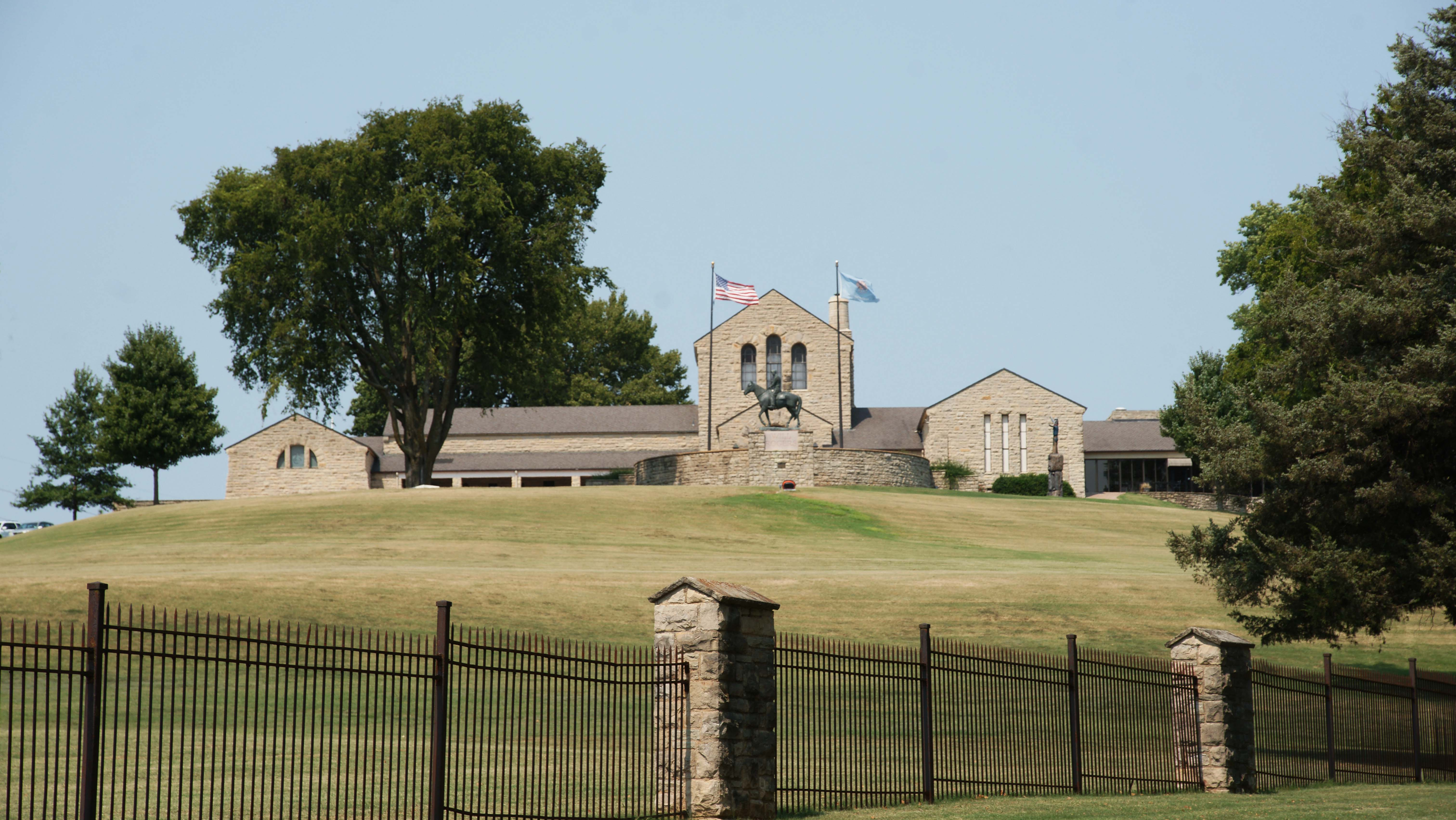
The Will Rogers Memorial Museum in Claremore, Oklahoma

=== Colorado memorial ===
The Will Rogers Shrine of the Sun is an 80-foot observation tower on Cheyenne Mountain west of Colorado Springs, at the base of Pikes Peak near the Cheyenne Mountain Zoo.

=== California memorials ===
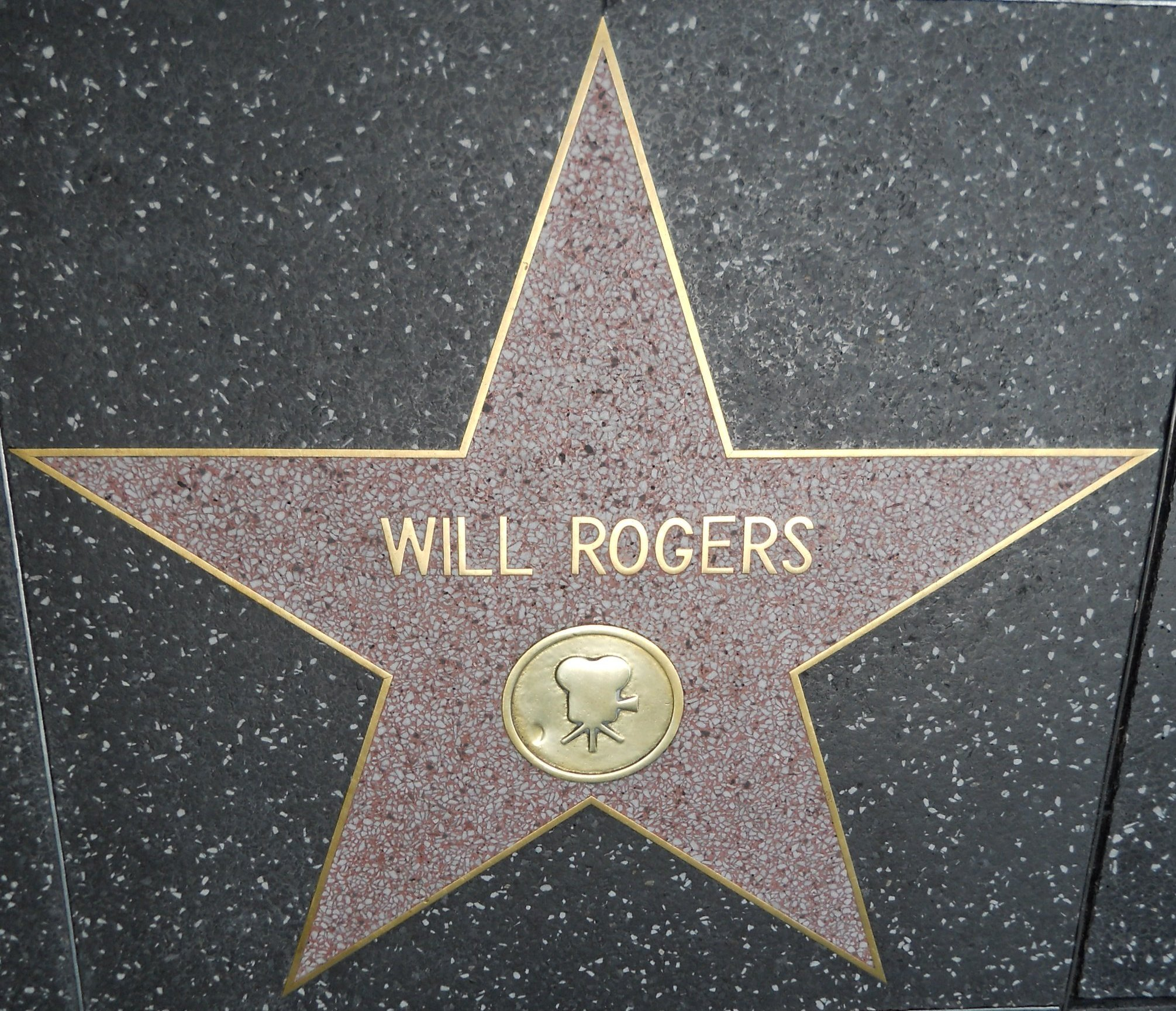
Rogers' star on the Hollywood Walk of Fame, at 6401 Hollywood Blvd

Rogers's California home, stables, and polo fields were preserved from 1944 to 2025 for public enjoyment as Will Rogers State Historic Park in Pacific Palisades. His widow, Betty, willed the property to the state of California upon her death in 1944, under the condition that polo be played on the field every year; it is home to the Will Rogers Polo Club. The house and stables burnt down during the Palisades Fire on January 8, 2025.

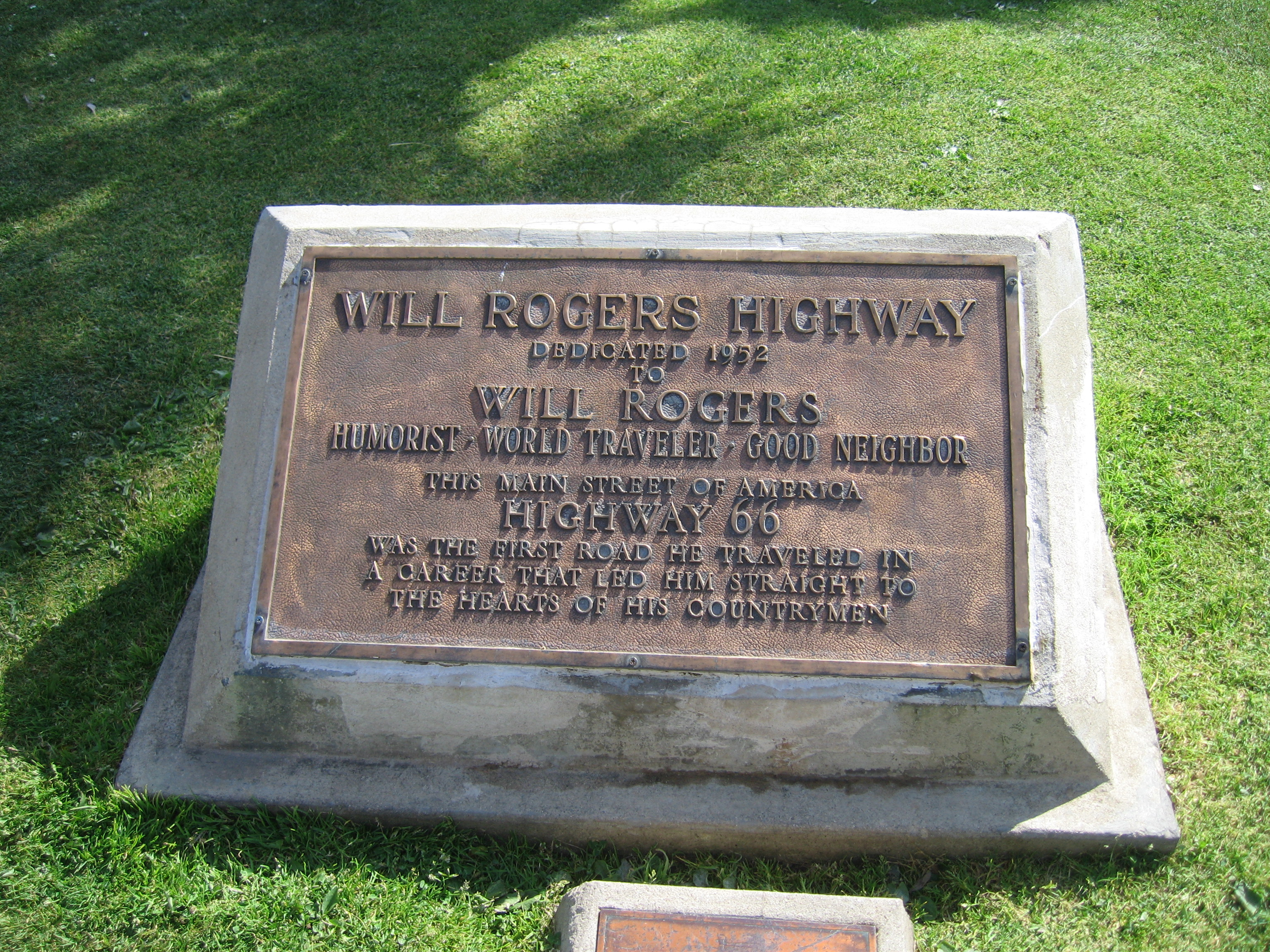
Will Rogers Monument, at the western terminus of Route 66

Several schools have been named for him: Will Rogers Elementary School in Santa Monica, Will Rogers Elementary School in Ventura, middle schools in Long Beach and in Fair Oaks.

Will Rogers Memorial Park, a small park at Sunset Boulevard and Beverly Drive in Beverly Hills, was named after him, as is Will Rogers State Beach in Pacific Palisades.

U.S. Route 66 was known as the Will Rogers Highway. A plaque dedicating the highway to the humorist is located at the western terminus of Route 66 in Santa Monica.

The California Theatre in San Bernardino is the site of the humorist's final show. He always performed in front of a special jewelled curtain and had two of them. While he was using one, he would send the other to the site of his next performance. The curtain used in his final show was retained by the California Theatre. Two memorial murals by Kent Twitchell were installed on the exterior of the fly loft. The California Theatre named one of its reception spaces the Will Rogers Room.

=== Texas memorials ===
The Will Rogers Memorial Center was built in Fort Worth, Texas, in 1936. It includes:

- Will Rogers Coliseum (5,652 seats)
- Will Rogers Auditorium (2,856 seats)
- Will Rogers Equestrian Center

And other buildings. It includes a mural, a bust and a life-size statue of Will Rogers on Soapsuds, titled Riding into the Sunset, sculpted by Electra Waggoner Biggs.

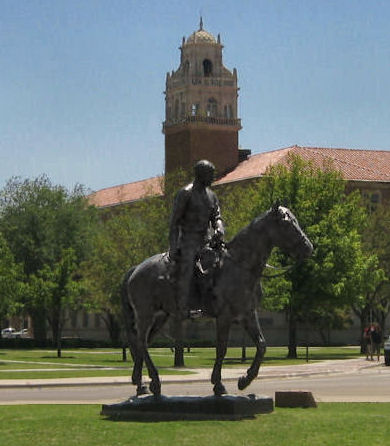
Riding into the Sunset, depicting Rogers riding his horse Soapsuds, on the campus of Texas Tech University

A casting of Riding into the Sunset stands at the entrance to the main campus quad at Texas Tech University in Lubbock, Texas. This memorial was dedicated in February 1950, by Rogers' longtime friend, Amon G. Carter. Another casting is held at the Will Rogers Memorial in Claremore, and a casting is located at the entrance of the Hilton Anatole in Dallas.

=== Washington State and Alaska memorials ===
Before heading up to Alaska, Rogers played polo at a field in Seattle. This was his "last ride" on a horse, so a monument was erected next to the field in 1938. A small monument at the Renton airport commemorates the starting point of the fatal 1935 Post-Rogers flight. A memorial is also located within the city of Utqiaġvik (formerly Barrow), Alaska.

=== National tributes ===
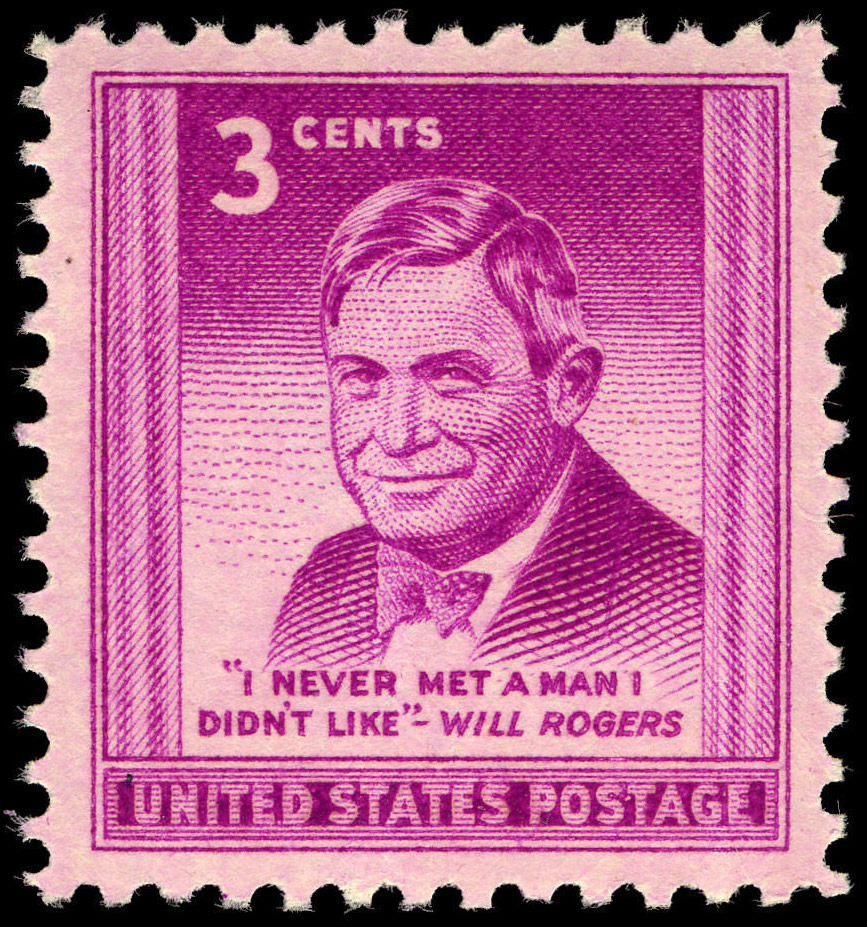
US Post Office stamp, 1948

In 1936, the NVA Hospital located in Saranac Lake, New York, was renamed as the Will Rogers Memorial Hospital by the National Vaudeville Artists association.

On November 4, 1948, the United States Post Office commemorated Rogers with a three-cent postage stamp. In 1979, it issued a United States Postal Service 15-cent stamp of him as part of the "Performing Arts" series.

In 1976, Rogers was among the historical figures depicted in the artwork Our Nation's 200th Birthday, The Telephone's 100th Birthday by Stanley Meltzoff for Bell System.

The airport for Utqiagvik (formerly Barrow), Alaska (BRW), located about 16 miles (26 km) from the location of the fatal airplane crash, is known as the Wiley Post–Will Rogers Memorial Airport.

The Rogers-Post Site, overlooking the lagoon where the plane crashed, has two (or possibly one remaining) monuments. It is on the National Register of Historic Places. A plaque to Rogers and Post was also erected in Utqiaġvik.

The World War II Liberty Ship SS Will Rogers was named in his honor.

The final ship of the Benjamin Franklin-class submarines, USS Will Rogers (SSBN-659), was launched in 1966, and commissioned the following year.

On November 4, 2019, Google celebrated his 140th birthday with a Google Doodle.

== Film and stage portrayals ==
Rogers was portrayed by A.A. Trimble in cameos in both the 1936 film The Great Ziegfeld, and the 1937 film You're a Sweetheart.

Rogers was portrayed by his son, Will Rogers Jr., in a cameo in the 1949 film Look for the Silver Lining, as the star of the 1952 film The Story of Will Rogers, and as a voice-only cameo in The American Adventure at Epcot.

James Whitmore portrayed Rogers in eight runs of the one-man play Will Rogers' USA between 1970 and 2000, including a limited run on Broadway in 1974, and as a television film in 1972. Whitmore changed the monologue each time he performed it, using quotations from Rogers as commentary on events current at the time of the performance.

The Tony Award-winning musical The Will Rogers Follies, produced on Broadway in 1991, starred Keith Carradine in the lead role. Carradine also played Rogers in the 1994 film Mrs. Parker and the Vicious Circle.

== Filmography ==
=== Silent films ===
- Laughing Bill Hyde (1918, film debut) – Bill Hyde
- Almost a Husband (1919) – Sam Lyman
- Jubilo (1919) – Jubilo
- Water, Water, Everywhere (1920) – Billy Fortune
- The Strange Boarder (1920) – Sam Gardner
- Jes' Call Me Jim (1920) – Jim Fenton
- Cupid the Cowpuncher (1920) – Alec Lloyd
- Honest Hutch (1920) – Hutch
- Guile of Women (1920) – Hjalmar Maartens
- The Illiterate Digest (1920)
- Boys Will Be Boys (1921) – Peep O'Day
- An Unwilling Hero (1921) – Dick
- Doubling for Romeo (1921) – Sam Cody / Romeo
- A Poor Relation (1921) – Noah Vale
- One Glorious Day (1922) – Professor Ezra Botts
- The Ropin' Fool (1922, Short) – 'Ropes' Reilly (the ropin' fool)
- The Headless Horseman (1922) – Ichabod Crane
- Fruits of Faith (1922, Short) – Larry
- One Day in 365 (1922, unreleased)
- Hollywood (1923) – Himself
- Jus' Passin' Through (1923, Short) – Jubilo
- Hustling Hank (1923, Short) – Hank
- Uncensored Movies (1923, Short) – Lem Skagwillow
- Two Wagons Both Covered (1923, Short) – Bill Bunian / Joe Jackson
- The Cowboy Sheik (1924, Short) – Two Straw Bill
- The Cake Eater (1924, Short)
- High Brow Stuff (1924, Short)
- Going to Congress (1924, Short) – Alfalfa Doolittle
- Don't Park There (1924, Short)
- Big Moments From Little Pictures (1924, Short) – Himself / Rufus the bullfighter / Robin Hood / Son / Police Chief
- Jubilo, Jr. (1924, Short) (part of the Our Gang series) – Himself
- Our Congressman (1924, Short) – Alfalfa Doolittle
- A Truthful Liar (1924, Short) – Ambassador Alfalfa Doolittle
- Gee Whiz Genevieve (1924, Short)
- Tip Toes (1927) – Uncle Hen Kaye
- A Texas Steer (1927) – Cattle Brander

Travelog Series

- In Dublin (1927, Short) – Himself
- In Paris (1927, Short) – Himself
- Hiking Through Holland (1927, Short) – Himself
- Hunting For Germans In Berlin (1927, Short) – Himself
- Through Switzerland And Bavaria (1927, Short) – Himself
- In London (1927, Short) – Himself
- Roaming The Emerald Isle (1927, Short) – Himself
- Prowling Around France (1927, Short) – Himself
- Winging Round Europe (1927, Short) – Himself
- Exploring England (1927, Short) – Himself
- Reeling Down The Rhine (1927, Short) – Himself
- Over The Bounding Blue (1928, Short) – Himself

=== Sound films ===
- Happy Days (1929) – Minstrel Show Performer
- They Had to See Paris (1929) – Pike Peters
- So This Is London (1930) – Hiram Draper
- Lightnin' (1930) – Lightnin' Bill Jones
- A Connecticut Yankee (1931) – Hank Martin
- Young as You Feel (1931) – Lemuel Morehouse
- Ambassador Bill (1931) – Bill Harper
- Business and Pleasure (1932) – Earl Tinker
- Down to Earth (1932) – Pike Peters
- Too Busy to Work (1932) – Jubilo
- State Fair (1933) – Abel Frake
- Doctor Bull (1933) – Dr. George 'Doc' Bull
- Mr. Skitch (1933) – Mr. Ira Skitch
- David Harum (1934) – David Harum
- Handy Andy (1934) – Andrew Yates
- Judge Priest (1934) – Judge Priest
- The County Chairman (1935) – Jim Hackler
- Life Begins at 40 (1935) – Kenesaw H. Clark
- Doubting Thomas (1935) – Thomas Brown
- Steamboat Round the Bend (1935) – Doctor John Pearly
- In Old Kentucky (1935) – Steve Tapley (final film role)

== References and further reading ==
=== Biographies ===
External videos
- Booknotes interview with Ben Yagoda on Will Rogers: A Biography, September 25, 1994, C-SPAN

- Carnes, Mark C. Will Rogers and "His" America (2010).
- Ketchum, Richard M. Will Rogers: His Life and Times (1973)
- O'Brien, P. J. (1935). Will Rogers, Ambassador of Good Will Prince of Wit and Wisdom.
- Robinson, Ray (1996). American Original: A Life of Will Rogers. 288 pp.
- Rogers, Betty (1941). Will Rogers: His Story As Told By His Wife. 312 pp. Garden City Publishing Company, Garden City, New York.
- Rollins, Peter C. (1984). Will Rogers: A Bio-Bibliography. Greenwood, 282 pp.
- Sterling, Bryan B., and Frances N. Sterling (1989). Will Rogers' World.
- Yagoda, Ben (1993). Will Rogers: A Biography excerpt and text search

=== Scholarly studies ===
- Brown, William R. (1979). "Will Rogers and His Magic Mirror". Chronicles of Oklahoma. 57 (3): 300–25.
- Coleman, Timothy S. "All We Know of Nation Is What We See in the Pictures: Will Rogers and the National Imaginary in 1920s and 1930s America". PhD dissertation, Wayne State U. 2003. 183 pp. DAI 2004 64(12): 4245-A. DA3116488 Fulltext: ProQuest Dissertations & Theses
- Jenkins, Ronald Scott. "Representative Clowns: Comedy and Democracy in America". PhD dissertation Harvard U. 1984. 208 pp. DAI 1984 45(4): 1187-A. DA8416931 Fulltext: ProQuest Dissertations & Theses
- Johnson, Bobby H. and R. Stanley Mohler. "Wiley Post, His Winnie Mae, and the World's First Pressure Suit". Washington: Smithsonian Institution, 1971.
- Roach, Fred, Jr. "Will Rogers' Youthful Relationship with His Father, Clem Rogers: a Story of Love and Tension". Chronicles of Oklahoma 1980 58(3): 325–42. ISSN 0009-6024
- Roach, Fred; Jr. (1979). "Vision of the Future: Will Rogers' Support of Commercial Aviation". Chronicles of Oklahoma. 57 (3): 340–64.
- Rollins, Peter C. "Will Rogers: Symbolic Man, Journalist, and Film Image". Journal of Popular Culture 1976 9(4): 851–77.
- Rollins, Peter C. (1979). "Will Rogers, Ambassador sans Portfolio: Letters from a Self-made Diplomat to His President". Chronicles of Oklahoma. 57 (3): 326–39.
- Smallwood, James M. (1988). "Will Rogers of Oklahoma: Spokesman for the 'Common Man'". Journal of the West. 27 (2): 45–49.
- Southard, Bruce (1979). "Will Rogers and the Language of the Southwest: a Centennial Perspective". Chronicles of Oklahoma. 57 (3): 365–75.
- Ware, Amy (2009). "Unexpected Cowboy, Unexpected Indian: The Case of Will Rogers". Ethnohistory. 56 (1): 1–34. doi:10.1215/00141801-2008-034.

=== Books by Rogers ===
- Rogers, Will (1975) [1924]. Joseph A. Stout, Jr. (ed.). Rogers-isms: The Cowboy Philosopher On Prohibition. Stillwater: Oklahoma State University Press. ISBN 0-914956-06-X.
- Rogers, Will (2003) [1924]. Illiterate Digest. Kessinger Publishing. ISBN 978-0-7661-4321-0.
- Rogers, Will (1977) [1926]. Joseph A. Stout (ed.). Letters of a Self-Made Diplomat To His President. Stillwater: Oklahoma State University Press. ISBN 0-914956-09-4.
- Rogers, Will (1982). Steven K. Gragert (ed.). More letters of a self-made diplomat. Stillwater: Oklahoma State University Press. ISBN 978-0-914956-22-8.
- Rogers, Will (1927). There's Not A Bathing Suit in Russia.
- Rogers, Will (1982) [1928]. "He chews to run": Will Rogers' Life magazine articles, 1928. Stillwater: Oklahoma State University Press. ISBN 0-914956-20-5.
- Rogers, Will (1983). Steven K. Gragert (ed.). Radio Broadcasts of Will Rogers. Stillwater: Oklahoma State University Press. ISBN 0-914956-24-8.
- Sterling, Bryan and Frances (2001). Forgotten Eagle: Wiley Post: America's Heroic Aviation Pioneer. New York: Carroll & Graf Publishers. ISBN 0-7867-0894-8.
- Rogers, Will (1926). Letters of a Self-Made Diplomat to His President
- Rogers, Will, and Joseph H. Carter. Never Met a Man I Didn't Like (1991) excerpt and text search
- Rogers, Will. Will Rogers at the Ziegfeld Follies. ed. by Arthur Frank Wertheim, (1992). 288 pp.
- Rogers, Will. Will Rogers' Weekly Articles. Vol. 1, The Harding/Coolidge Years, 1922–1925. ed. by James M. Smallwood, (1980). 431 pp.
- Rogers, Will. Will Rogers' Weekly Articles. Vol. 2: The Coolidge Years, 1925–1927. ed. by Steven K. Gragert, (1980). 368 pp.
- Rogers, Will. Will Rogers' Weekly Articles. Vol. 3: The Coolidge Years, 1927–1929. ed. by Steven K. Gragert, (1981). 304 pp.
- Rogers, Will. Will Rogers' Weekly Articles. Vol. 4: The Hoover Years, 1929–1931. ed. by Steven K. Gragert, (1981). 278 pp.
- Rogers, Will. Will Rogers' Daily Telegrams. Vol. l, The Coolidge Years, 1926–1929. ed. by James M. Smallwood, 1978. 453 pp.
- Rogers, Will. Will Rogers' Daily Telegrams. Vol. 4, The Roosevelt Years, 1933–1935. ed. by James M. Smallwood, (1979). 457 pp.
- Rogers, Will. Convention Articles of Will Rogers. ed. by Joseph A. Stout, 1976. 174 pp.
- Rogers, Will. The Writings of Will Rogers. Volume 3: Illiterate Digest. ed. by Joseph A. Stout, Jr., 1974. 230 pp.
- Rogers, Will (1948). Day, Donald (ed.). Autobiography of Will Rogers; Selected and Edited by Donald Day. Boston: Houghton Mifflin.
- Rogers, Will. Rogers-isms: the Cowboy Philosopher on the Peace Conference, (1919). Online at Project Gutenberg
- Sterling, Bryan B., and Frances N. Sterling, eds. Will Rogers Speaks: Over 1,000 Timeless Quotations for Public Speakers (And Writers, Politicians Comedians, Browsers) (1995).
- The Papers of Will Rogers
  - Rogers, Will (1996). Steven K. Gragert and M. Jane Johansson (ed.). The Papers of Will Rogers: The Early Years : November 1879 – April 1904. Norman: University of Oklahoma Press. ISBN 978-0-8061-2745-3. Online at archive.org
  - Rogers, Will (2000). Steven K. Gragert; M. Jane Johansson (eds.). Papers of Will Rogers : Wild West and Vaudeville, April 1904 –September 1908, Volume Two. Norman: University of Oklahoma Press. ISBN 978-0-8061-3267-9. Online at archive.org
  - Rogers, Will (2005). Steven K. Gragert; M. Jane Johansson (eds.). The Papers of Will Rogers: From Broadway to the National Stage, September 1915 – July 1928. Norman: University of Oklahoma Press. ISBN 978-0-8061-3704-9.
  - Rogers, Will (2005). Steven K. Gragert; M. Jane Johansson (eds.). The Papers of Will Rogers: From Broadway to the National Stage, September 1915 – July 1928. Norman, Oklahoma: University of Oklahoma Press. ISBN 978-0-8061-3704-9.
  - Rogers, Will (2006). Steven K. Gragert; M. Jane Johansson (eds.). The Papers of Will Rogers: The Final Years, August 1928 – August 1935. Norman: University of Oklahoma Press. ISBN 978-0-8061-3768-1.

=== Articles by Rogers ===
- "The House That Jokes Built," Photoplay, July 1921, p. 36.

== See also ==
- Will Rogers phenomenon
- List of people on the cover of Time Magazine: 1920s – July 19, 1926

== Sources ==
- "Humor's sober side: Being an interview with Will Rogers, another of a series on how humorists get that way by Josephine van der Grift," Bisbee Daily Review, October 15, 1922, p. 4.
- O'Brien, P. J. (1935). Will Rogers: Ambassador of Good Will, Prince of Wit and Wisdom. N.P.: Winston.
- "Claim Will Rogers Is Free To Insult Race Under Agreement". Kansas City (MO) Plaindealer, February 2, 1934, p. 2.
- "Protest Will Rogers' Radio Speech". Pittsburgh Courier, January 27, 1934, p. 1.
- Sterling, Bryan B., and Frances N. Sterling, eds. (1995). Will Rogers Speaks: Over 1,000 Timeless Quotations for Public Speakers (And Writers, Politicians Comedians, Browsers). ISBN 0871317958
- "Will Rogers Hurls Back A Second Insult". Baltimore Afro-American, February 3, 1934, p. 1.
- Yagoda, Ben (2000). Will Rogers: A Biography. Norman: University of Oklahoma Press. ISBN 978-0-8061-3238-9.

All references to Will Rogers concerned with early life and the annual celebration in or around Higgins, Texas are taken from the Texas State Historical Association.
