= Dog Iron Ranch =

Historic house in Oklahoma, United States

- Will Rogers Birthplace
- U.S. National Register of Historic Places
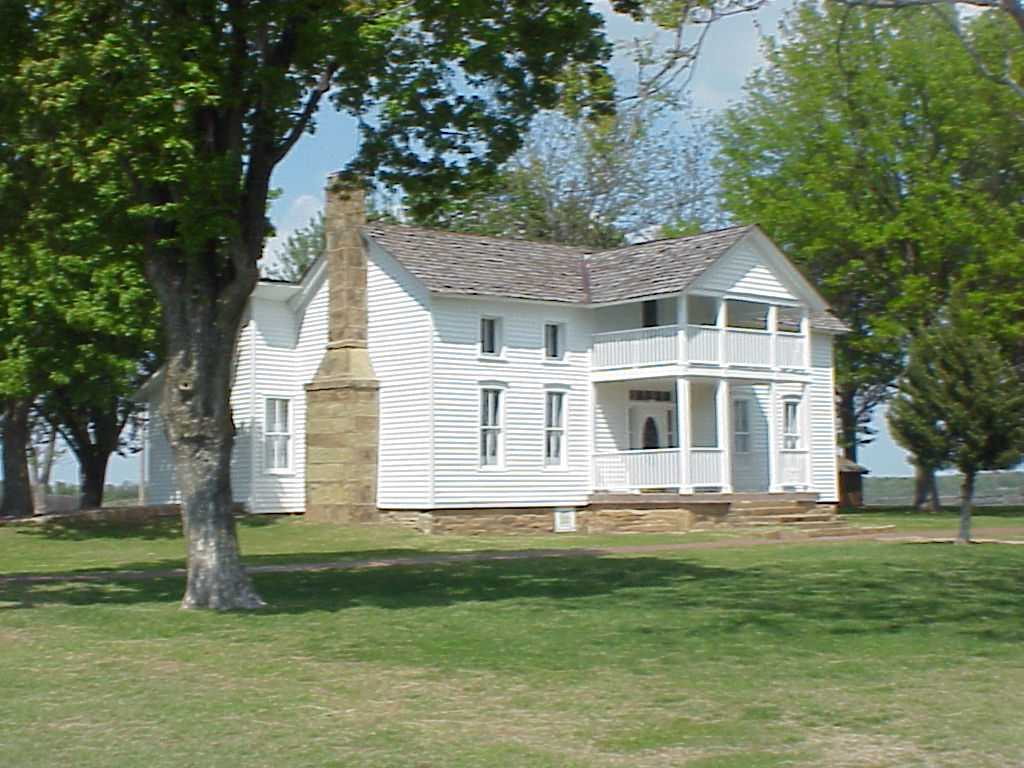
- The house at Dog Iron Ranch in which Will Rogers was born

- Location within Oklahoma Location within the United States
- Location: Rogers County, Oklahoma, U.S.
- Nearest city: 9501 E. 380 Rd., Oologah, Oklahoma
- Coordinates: 36°28′10″N 95°39′26″W
- Area: 1,536 square feet (142.7 m^{2})
- Built: 1875
- Architectural style: Greek Revival
- NRHP reference No.: 70000538
- Added to NRHP: September 29, 1970

Dog Iron Ranch is a historic ranch located about two miles east of Oologah, Oklahoma, United States. The birthplace of humorist Will Rogers, it was donated to the State of Oklahoma by the Rogers family, and is now owned and operated by the Cherokee Nation. The current property comprises 400 acres (1.6 km^{2}) of the original 60,000-acre (240 km^{2}) ranch operated by Clem Rogers, Will's father, a prominent cattle rancher and Cherokee politician. Originally the ranch contained up to 10,000 Texas Longhorn cattle. The present ranch has 50 Longhorns.

== History ==
Clem Rogers built the two-story Greek Revival house in 1875, four years before his famous son Will was born, and lived there until his wife died in 1890. The first floor is constructed of native oak, hickory and walnut logs. It measures 48 feet (15 m) by 32 feet (9.8 m), covering an area of 1,536 square feet (142.7 m^{2}). Originally the two front rooms were each 16 feet (4.9 m) square, separated by a dog trot that was later enclosed to make a foyer. The downstairs rooms were used as a parlor and a master bedroom that also served as Clem Rogers' office. A lean-to addition comprised the kitchen, dining room and a spare bedroom. The upstairs part over the "front rooms" had two more bedrooms.

Clem Rogers was highly influential in local politics; the house served not only as a family residence, but represented a seat of local political power, often called "The White House on the Verdigris." (Note: The building had a white clapboard exterior. The Verdigris River flowed nearby.)

The present barn was erected on July 17, 1993, by two dozen Amish carpenters who knew the traditional notch and peg type of construction that was commonly employed in the 19th century. However, the peak roof is covered with asphalt shingles instead of wooden shakes for greater fire safety. The new barn is 48 feet (15 m) by 64 feet (20 m), instead of 50 feet (15 m) by 60 feet (18 m) for economic reasons. The original barn and possibly two replacements had been destroyed by wildfires. The current barn has traditional stalls, and also includes a classroom area usable as an eating area.

The house where Will Rogers was born was moved about a mile in the 1960s to its present site on the ranch due to the building of the nearby Lake Oologah reservoir.

On March 7, 2016, Governor Mary Fallin signed Senate Bill 1570 into law, effective immediately, which put the Will Rogers Memorial Commission, which governed both the Will Rogers Memorial Museum and the Dog Iron Ranch, under the control of the Oklahoma Historical Society. Ownership of the Will Rogers Birthplace Ranch was transferred to the Cherokee Nation on June 12, 2023; it is open to visitors.

The property known as Will Rogers Ranch in Pacific Palisades was purchased by the actor in the early 1930s after Rogers moved to California. It became the Will Rogers State Historic Park (a California State Park) in 1944.

== See also ==
- Will Rogers Memorial
