= Oologah Lake =

Lake Oologah
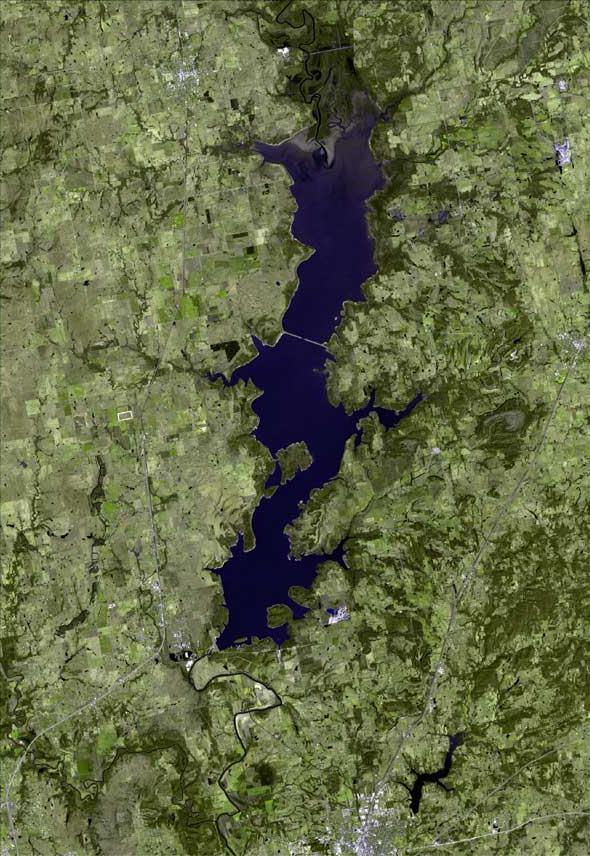

- Location within Oklahoma Location within the United States
- Location: Rogers / Nowata counties, Oklahoma
- Coordinates: 36°33′N 95°36′W
- Type: reservoir
- Primary inflows: Verdigris River
- Primary outflows: Verdigris River
- Basin countries: United States
- Surface area: 29,000 acres (120 km^{2})
- Average depth: 19 ft (5.7 m)
- Max. depth: 80 ft (24.4 m)
- Water volume: 522,210 acre⋅ft (644,140,000 m^{3})
- Residence time: 109 days (9,400 ks)
- Shore length^{1}: 209 mi (336 km)
- Surface elevation: 638 ft (194 m)
- Islands: 3
- Settlements: Oologah, Nowata, Claremore
- ^{1} Shore length is not a well-defined measure.

Lake Oologah is a reservoir in northeastern Oklahoma. It is located near the towns of Oologah, Nowata, and Claremore. The lake has a surface of 29,500 acres (119 km^{2}) of water and 209 miles (336 km) of shoreline with 11 lake-side parks. The water storage capacity is rated as 552,210 acre-feet (681,140,000 m^{3}). The lake is formed along the Verdigris River, and is a source of water for the Tulsa Metropolitan Area. The purpose of the dam and lake is flood control, water supply, navigation, and recreation. Recreation opportunities include fishing, hunting, hiking and horseback riding, sailing, camping, and picnicking.

== Background ==
The dam and lake were built by the U.S. Army Corps of Engineers, who still administer it. The project was authorized by the Flood Control Act of 1938 and construction began in 1950. In 1951, construction was halted and resumed in 1955. In 1963, the majority of the project was complete and all facilities were in 1974. In 1976, the City of Tulsa built a pipeline connecting Oologah to the Lynn Lane Reservoir in Tulsa. Raw water supplied by this system is treated by A. B. Jewell Water Treatment Plant, which was built in 1974 with a design capacity of 90,000,000 US gallons per day (340,000 m^{3}/d). The Jewell plant capacity has since been expanded to 120,000,000 US gallons per day (450,000 m^{3}/d).

The Oologah Dam is located at 36°25′19″N 95°40′49″W and is an earth-fill embankment type. Its maximum height is 137 ft (42 m) above the river bed and the embankment is 4,000 ft (1,219 m) long. The dam's spillway is located 2 mi (3 km) to the east and is composed of seven radial gates.

Recreation opportunities include a swimming beach, mountain biking, marina, RV and tent camping, picnic tables and a playground. On the east side of the lake, the Will Rogers Country Centennial Trail winds around the shore from the Spillway to Blue Creek Park totaling 18 miles.

Famous American actor, philosopher, cowboy, and writer, Will Rogers, was born on the Dog Iron Ranch which now sits on the shores of Oologah Lake, where it was relocated, since the basin was dammed and flooded.
