= National Register of Historic Places listings in Kenton County, Kentucky =

Location of Kenton County in Kentucky

This is intended to be a complete list of the properties and districts on the National Register of Historic Places in Kenton County, Kentucky, United States. The locations of National Register properties and districts for which the latitude and longitude coordinates are included below, may be seen in a map.

There are 71 properties and districts listed on the National Register in the county; 2 of these are National Historic Landmarks. Another property was once listed but has been removed.

This National Park Service list is complete through NPS recent listings posted October 30, 2026.

== Current listings ==
	Name on the Register	Image	Date listed	Location	City or town	Description
1	Austinberg Historic District	Austinberg Historic District	February 18, 1987 (#86003483)	Roughly bounded by the Chesapeake & Ohio railroad line, the Licking River floodwall, rear lot lines on the northern side of Wallace Ave., and Madison Ave; 39°04′11″N 84°30′03″W	Covington	
2	Battery Bates and Battery Coombs		September 10, 2018 (#100002920)	Sleepy Hollow Rd., Devou Park; 39°04′40″N 84°32′38″W	Covington	
3	Bavarian Brewing Company	Bavarian Brewing Company	March 21, 1996 (#96000281)	522 W. 12th St. 39°04′38″N 84°31′05″W	Covington	
4	Daniel Carter Beard Boyhood Home	Daniel Carter Beard Boyhood Home	October 15, 1966 (#66000360)	322 E. 3rd St. 39°05′21″N 84°30′20″W	Covington	
5	Beechwood Historic District	Beechwood Historic District	December 11, 1989 (#89001168)	Roughly bounded by Beechwood Rd., Dixie Highway, and Woodlawn Ave. 39°02′49″N 84°33′15″W	Fort Mitchell	
6	Cathedral Basilica of the Assumption	Cathedral Basilica of the Assumption	July 20, 1973 (#73000812)	1130 Madison Ave. 39°04′42″N 84°30′29″W	Covington	
7	Central Ludlow Historic District	Central Ludlow Historic District	November 28, 1984 (#84000526)	Roughly bounded by Glenwood, Church, Adela, and Carneal Sts. 39°05′34″N 84°33′00″W	Ludlow	
8	Covington and Cincinnati Suspension Bridge	Covington and Cincinnati Suspension Bridge	May 15, 1975 (#75000786)	Spans the Ohio River between Covington and Cincinnati, Ohio; 39°05′32″N 84°30′34″W	Covington	Extends into Cincinnati, Ohio
9	Covington Downtown Commercial Historic District	Covington Downtown Commercial Historic District	June 9, 1983 (#83002804)	Roughly bounded by the Chesapeake & Ohio railroad line, Robbins, Greenup, 4th, 9th, Washington, 7th Sts., Madison Ave., Scott Blvd., Pine, and E. 8th Sts. 39°05′01″N 84°30′38″W	Covington	Lists of streets beginning with "also" represent separate boundary increases
10	Dixie Highway Historic District	Dixie Highway Historic District	February 19, 1988 (#88000146)	2696, 2698, 2700, 2708, and 2712 Dixie Hwy. 39°01′56″N 84°34′18″W	Lakeside Park	
11	Frank Duveneck House and Studio	Frank Duveneck House and Studio	September 29, 2015 (#15000652)	1226 Greenup St. 39°04′38″N 84°30′19″W	Covington	
12	Eleventh District School	Eleventh District School	June 16, 1983 (#83002805)	Parkway and Altamont St. 39°05′25″N 84°32′09″W	Covington	
13	Elmwood Hall	Elmwood Hall	August 7, 1972 (#72000541)	244–246 Forest Ave. 39°05′42″N 84°32′56″W	Ludlow	
14	Emery Row	Emery Row	November 14, 1985 (#85002820)	810–828 Scott Boulevard; 38°59′30″N 84°30′42″W	Covington	
15	Emery-Price Historic District	Emery-Price Historic District	February 18, 1987 (#86003484)	Roughly bounded by 8th, Greenup, and 11th Sts., and the alley behind the western side of Scott Blvd. 39°04′53″N 84°30′24″W	Covington	
16	Erlanger Proper Subdivision Historic District	Erlanger Proper Subdivision Historic District	September 6, 2002 (#02000918)	Roughly bounded by Hulbert, Division, Crescent, Dixie, and Graves. 39°01′12″N 84°36′02″W	Erlanger	
17	Fifth District School	Fifth District School	November 25, 2005 (#05001320)	1735 Holman Ave. 39°04′06″N 84°30′44″W	Covington	
18	Fort Mitchell Heights Historic District	Fort Mitchell Heights Historic District	September 8, 1989 (#89001169)	Roughly bounded by Park Rd., Barrington Rd., Dixie Highway, and Fortside Dr. 39°03′29″N 84°32′44″W	Fort Mitchell	
19	Fourth District Elementary School	Fourth District Elementary School	February 3, 2010 (#09001309)	1508–1510 Scott St. 39°04′26″N 84°30′21″W	Covington	
20	GAR Monument in Covington	GAR Monument in Covington	July 17, 1997 (#97000684)	1413 Holman St. 39°04′23″N 84°30′53″W	Covington	
21	Hearne House	Hearne House	June 24, 1974 (#74000888)	500 Garrard St. 39°05′11″N 84°30′21″W	Covington	
22	Helentown Historic District	Helentown Historic District	February 18, 1987 (#86003481)	Roughly bounded by 11th and Wheeler Sts., the Chesapeake & Ohio railroad line, and Madison Boulevard; 39°04′34″N 84°30′16″W	Covington	
23	Hellman Lumber and Manufacturing Company	Hellman Lumber and Manufacturing Company	March 17, 2015 (#15000084)	321 W. 12th St. 39°04′35″N 84°30′52″W	Covington	
24	Highland Cemetery Historic District	Highland Cemetery Historic District	October 12, 1989 (#89001585)	2167 Dixie Highway; 39°02′31″N 84°32′48″W	Fort Mitchell	
25	Holy Cross Church and School Complex-Latonia	Holy Cross Church and School Complex-Latonia	April 17, 1986 (#86000800)	3600 block of Church St. 39°02′52″N 84°30′08″W	Covington	
26	House at 855–857 Oak Street	House at 855–857 Oak Street	November 28, 1984 (#84000320)	855–857 Oak Street; 39°05′09″N 84°33′25″W	Ludlow	
27	House at 859 Oak Street	House at 859 Oak Street	November 28, 1984 (#84000329)	859 Oak St. 39°05′07″N 84°33′28″W	Ludlow	
28	JOHN W. HUBBARD (sternwheeler)	JOHN W. HUBBARD (sternwheeler)	May 20, 1982 (#82002729)	Greenup St. 39°05′29″N 84°30′30″W	Covington	
29	Independence Historic District		October 25, 2024 (#16000500)	Portions of Madison & McCullum Pikes; 38°56′36″N 84°32′39″W	Independence	
30	Kenney's Crossing	Kenney's Crossing	March 22, 1990 (#90000481)	1001 Highway Ave. 39°05′24″N 84°31′45″W	Covington	
31	Kenton County Library	Kenton County Library	October 31, 1972 (#72000540)	1028 Scott St. 39°04′48″N 84°30′26″W	Covington	
32	Kruempelman Farmhouse	Kruempelman Farmhouse	September 8, 1989 (#89001171)	24 Ridge Rd. 39°03′23″N 84°32′55″W	Fort Mitchell	
33	Lambs Ferry Farmstead		August 31, 2026 (#100013339)	4633 Lambs Ferry Road; 38°57′48″N 84°26′32″W	Ryland Heights vicinity	
34	LaSalette Academy	LaSalette Academy	November 14, 2011 (#11000791)	702 Greenup St. 39°05′02″N 84°30′24″W	Covington	
35	Lee-Holman Historic District	Lee-Holman Historic District	July 25, 1996 (#96000798)	Bounded by W. Robbins, Holman, W. 12th, and Lee Sts. 39°04′40″N 84°30′52″W	Covington	
36	Lewisburg Historic District	Lewisburg Historic District	November 5, 1993 (#93001165)	Roughly bounded by Interstate 75 and the Covington city limits 39°04′37″N 84°31′23″W	Covington	
37	Licking Riverside Historic District	Licking Riverside Historic District	July 30, 1975 (#75000787)	Roughly bounded by 4th, Scott, 8th Sts., and the Licking River; 39°05′05″N 84°30′22″W	Covington	
38	Lincoln-Grant School	Lincoln-Grant School	July 29, 2013 (#13000562)	824 Greenup St. 39°04′56″N 84°30′22″W	Covington	
39	Linden Grove Cemetery	Linden Grove Cemetery	January 4, 2001 (#00001600)	1421 Holman Ave. 39°04′25″N 84°30′53″W	Covington	
40	Ludlow Lagoon Clubhouse	Ludlow Lagoon Clubhouse	November 28, 1984 (#84000348)	312 Lake St. 39°05′04″N 84°33′15″W	Ludlow	
41	The Ludlow Theater	The Ludlow Theater	March 27, 2013 (#13000111)	322–326 Elm St. 39°05′37″N 84°32′58″W	Ludlow	
42	Magnus Metal Company Building		November 1, 2023 (#100009531)	4 Highway Avenue; 39°05′43″N 84°32′34″W	Ludlow	
43	Maxwell House	Maxwell House	November 28, 1984 (#84000350)	27 River Rd. 39°05′45″N 84°32′30″W	Ludlow	
44	Prettyman Merry House		January 8, 1987 (#87000203)	Shelby St. 39°04′50″N 84°33′49″W	Bromley	
45	Metcalfe-Stephens House	Metcalfe-Stephens House	November 12, 1998 (#98001290)	5241 Madison Pike; 38°56′42″N 84°32′36″W	Independence	
46	Moser Family Houses	Moser Family Houses	August 2, 2000 (#00000858)	1224 and 1226 Highway Ave. 39°05′23″N 84°31′58″W	Covington	
47	Mother of God Roman Catholic Church	Mother of God Roman Catholic Church	July 24, 1973 (#73000813)	119 W. 6th St. 39°05′02″N 84°30′45″W	Covington	
48	Mutter Gottes Historic District	Mutter Gottes Historic District	May 29, 1980 (#80004499)	Roughly bounded by Madison Ave., 4th, Harvey, and Johnson Sts.; also roughly bounded by Madison Ave. and 4th, Harvey, and Johnson Sts. 39°05′06″N 84°30′49″W	Covington	Second list of streets represents a boundary increase
49	Northern Bank of Kentucky	Northern Bank of Kentucky	December 23, 1998 (#98001487)	241–45 Scott Blvd. 39°05′18″N 84°30′36″W	Covington	
50	Odd Fellows Hall	Odd Fellows Hall	August 11, 1980 (#80001646)	5th and Madison Sts. 39°05′09″N 84°30′38″W	Covington	
51	Old Fort Mitchell Historic District	Old Fort Mitchell Historic District	September 8, 1989 (#89001170)	Roughly bounded by Saint Johns Rd., Dixie Highway, E. Maple Ave., and Edgewood Rd. 39°03′20″N 84°33′06″W	Fort Mitchell	
52	Overman & Schrader Cordage Company		April 11, 2025 (#100011678)	1564 Banklick Street; 39°04′17″N 84°30′41″W	Covington	
53	Park Hills Historic District	Park Hills Historic District	March 13, 2008 (#07001252)	Roughly bounded by Dixie Highway, Montague, Breckenridge, Sleepy Hollow Rds., Old State, Arlington Rds., and St. James Ave. 39°04′17″N 84°31′56″W	Park Hills	
54	Robert Patton House	Robert Patton House	March 1, 1984 (#84001789)	1533 Garrard St. 39°03′51″N 84°30′10″W	Covington	
55	Peaselburg Neighborhood Historic District		March 13, 2017 (#16000501)	W. 16th, Holman, W. 19th & Russell Sts. 39°04′10″N 84°30′39″W	Covington	
56	Pleasant Run Stone House I	Pleasant Run Stone House I	January 8, 1987 (#87000153)	Bromley Rd. off Kentucky Route 8; 39°04′31″N 84°33′29″W	Bromley	
57	Pleasant Run Stone House II	Pleasant Run Stone House II	January 8, 1987 (#87000154)	Bromley Rd. off Kentucky Route 8; 39°04′19″N 84°33′36″W	Bromley	
58	Ritte's Corner Historic District, Latonia	Ritte's Corner Historic District, Latonia	May 21, 1987 (#87000776)	Roughly bounded by DeCoursey, Southern, Inez, and Winston Aves.; also approximately 3424–3601 Decoursey Ave., 9 E. Southern Ave., and CSX railroad property 39°02′50″N 84°30′12″W	Covington	Second group of streets represents a boundary increase
59	Ritte's East Historic District		July 31, 2014 (#14000459)	CSX RR., Twin Oaks Golf Course, Winston, Decoursey & 40th Sts. 39°02′32″N 84°29′56″W	Covington	
60	Riverside Drive Historic District	Riverside Drive Historic District	November 23, 1971 (#71000350)	Bounded by Riverside Dr., 4th St., the Licking River, and the alley between Greenup and Garrard Sts.; also along sections of Greenup St., Court Ave., 3rd, and 4th Sts. 39°05′23″N 84°30′23″W	Covington	Second list of streets represents a boundary increase. Includes the Carneal House.
61	St. Augustine Church Complex	St. Augustine Church Complex	November 25, 2005 (#05001321)	1839 Euclid Ave. 39°03′58″N 84°30′47″W	Covington	
62	Seminary Square Historic District	Seminary Square Historic District	May 27, 1980 (#80001647)	Roughly bounded by railroad tracks and Holman, 9th, and 12th Sts. 39°04′45″N 84°30′45″W	Covington	
63	Amos Shinkle Summer Residence	Amos Shinkle Summer Residence	April 28, 1983 (#83002806)	U.S. Route 25; 39°01′49″N 84°34′32″W	Fort Mitchell	
64	Trinity Episcopal Church	Trinity Episcopal Church	March 1, 1982 (#82002730)	326 Madison Ave. 39°05′15″N 84°30′39″W	Covington	
65	Veteran's Monument in Covington	Veteran's Monument in Covington	July 17, 1997 (#97000685)	1413 Holman St. 39°04′22″N 84°30′54″W	Covington	
66	Wadsworth Electric Manufacturing Company	Wadsworth Electric Manufacturing Company	January 28, 1994 (#93001585)	20 W. 11th St. 39°04′45″N 84°30′36″W	Covington	
67	Wallace Woods Area Residential Historic District	Wallace Woods Area Residential Historic District	August 11, 1983 (#83002807)	Roughly bounded by 24th St. and Glenway, Wallace, and Madison Aves. 39°03′54″N 84°30′02″W	Covington	
68	West Fifteenth Street Historic District	West Fifteenth Street Historic District	February 18, 1987 (#86003485)	1445–1451 and 1501–1513 Madison Ave., 1421–1423 Neave St., and 10–32 W. Fifteenth St. 39°04′27″N 84°30′30″W	Covington	
69	West Side-Main Strasse Historic District	West Side-Main Strasse Historic District	November 10, 1983 (#83003650)	Roughly bounded by the Chesapeake & Ohio railroad line and 6th, Philadelphia, Dalton, Pike, and Robbins Sts. 39°04′52″N 84°31′00″W	Covington	
70	The Wolke House		April 21, 2025 (#100011311)	1205 Lee Street; 39°04′35″N 84°30′55″W	Covington	
71	William A. Yeager and Edward Mohr Farmstead		November 25, 1994 (#94001380)	5002 Madison Pike; 38°57′34″N 84°32′22″W	Independence	Demolished. Replace by school.

== Former listing ==
	Name on the Register	Image	Date listed	Date removed	Location	City or town	Description
1	Champion Ice Manufacturing and Cold Storage Company	Champion Ice Manufacturing and Cold Storage Company	March 7, 1979 (#79001016)	February 3, 1988	40 E. 2nd St.	Covington	

== See also ==
- List of National Historic Landmarks in Kentucky
- National Register of Historic Places listings in Kentucky
