= Wadsworth =

Wadsworth may refer to:

== People ==
- Wadsworth (given name)
- Wadsworth (surname)

== Places ==
- Wadsworth, Illinois, United States, a village
- Wadsworth, Kansas, United States
- Wadsworth, Nevada, United States, a census-designated place
- Wadsworth, Ohio, United States, a city
- Wadsworth, Texas, United States, an unincorporated community
- Wadsworth, West Yorkshire, England, a civil parish
- Wadsworth Township, Medina County, Ohio, United States

== Other ==
- Wadsworth Atheneum, art museum in Connecticut
- Wadsworth Center, public-health laboratory in New York
- Wadsworth Institute, Mennonite seminary in Wadsworth, Ohio (1868–1878)
- Wadsworth Chapel and Wadsworth Theatre, on the campus of the West Los Angeles Department of Veterans Affairs Medical Center, California
- Wadsworth Congregational Church, a historic church in Whitsett, North Carolina
- Wadsworth Union Church, Wadsworth, Nevada
- USS Wadsworth, three ships
- Wadsworth Barracks, an Australian Army base in Bandiana, Victoria, Australia
- Wadsworth Memorial Handicap, a Thoroughbred horse race run at Finger Lakes Race Track, New York
- Wadsworth Electric Manufacturing Company, a Covington, Kentucky company that went out of business in 1990
- Wadsworth Publishing, part of Cengage Group
- Wadsworth the Butler, a character in the 1985 film Clue
- Wadsworth – a meteorite that fell near Cleveland in Ohio on 17 March 2026.

== See also ==
- Henry Wadsworth Longfellow, American poet
- Wadsworth Falls State Park, Connecticut
- Fort Wadsworth, New York
- Wadsworth Fort Site, an archaeological site at Geneseo, New York
- Wadsworth Mansion at Long Hill, Middletown, Connecticut
- Wadworth
- Horner–Wadsworth–Emmons reaction, a variation on the Wittig chemical reaction
- Wadsworth constant deviation system, optics, a way to mount prisms or gratings on a turntable
