= LaSalette Academy =

Parochial school

- U.S. National Register of Historic Places
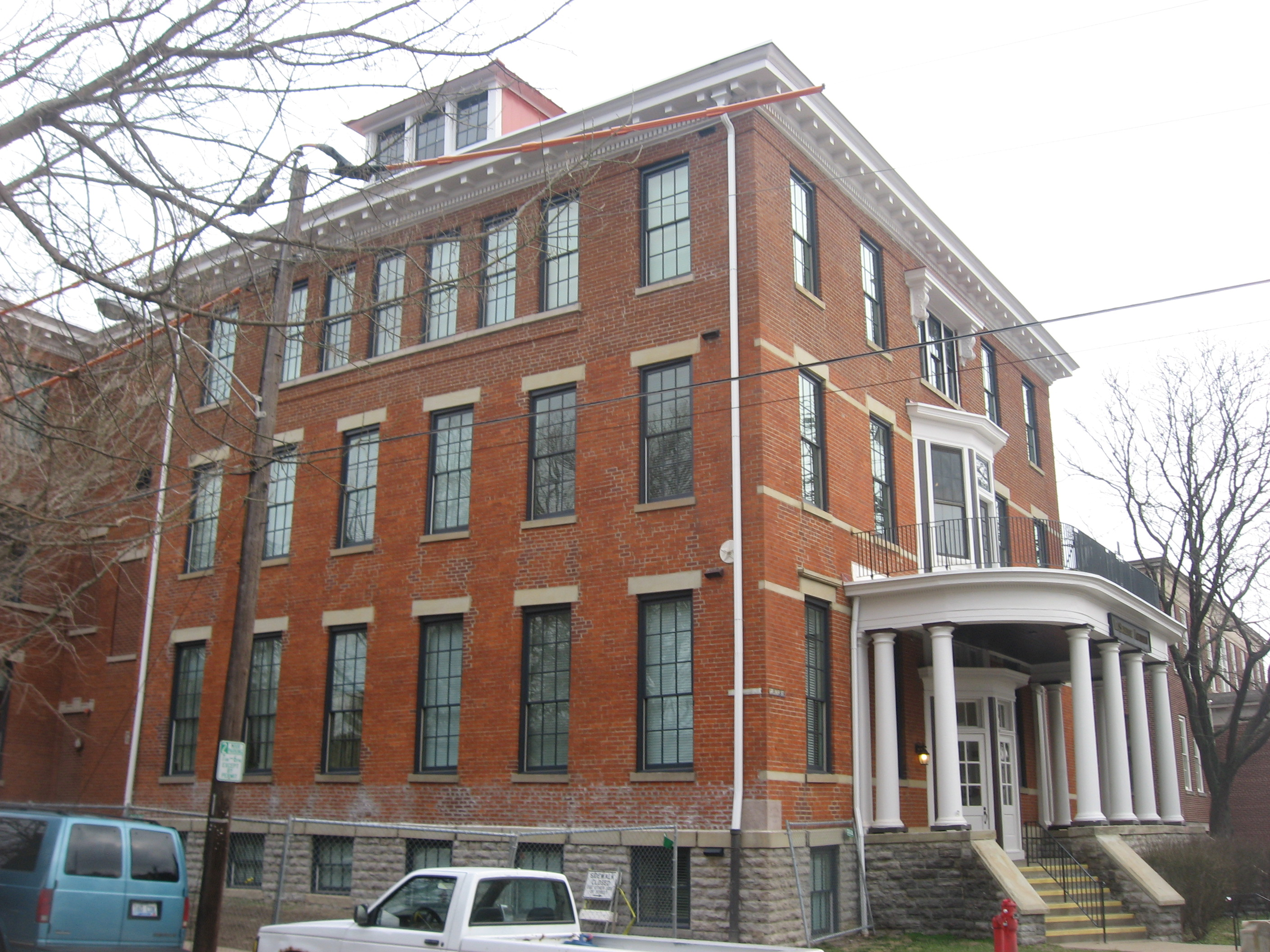

- Location within Kentucky Location within the United States
- Location: 702 Greenup St., Covington, Kentucky
- Coordinates: 39°05′02″N 84°30′24″W
- Area: 1 acre (0.40 ha)
- Built: 1886
- Architectural style: Colonial Revival
- NRHP reference No.: 11000791
- Added to NRHP: November 14, 2011

LaSalette Academy was a parochial school in Covington, Kentucky. It is listed on the National Register of Historic Places. It is at 702 Greenup Street. The former all-girls school is now LaSalette Garden Apartments.

It was established in 1856. A two-story building was constructed for it. It grew over time to 3-stories and a second building was added. It served as a co-ed elementary school and had a high school for girls. It integrated in 1955. The school's last class graduated in 1977 and the school building was redeveloped as senior housing.

The school appeared on a postcard sent in 1911. The building is in the Licking Riverside Historic District.

== Alumni ==
- Anne Lee Patterson

== See also ==
- National Register of Historic Places listings in Kenton County, Kentucky
- Lincoln-Grant School
