= Elmwood Hall (Ludlow, Kentucky) =

Historic house in Kentucky, United States

- U.S. National Register of Historic Places
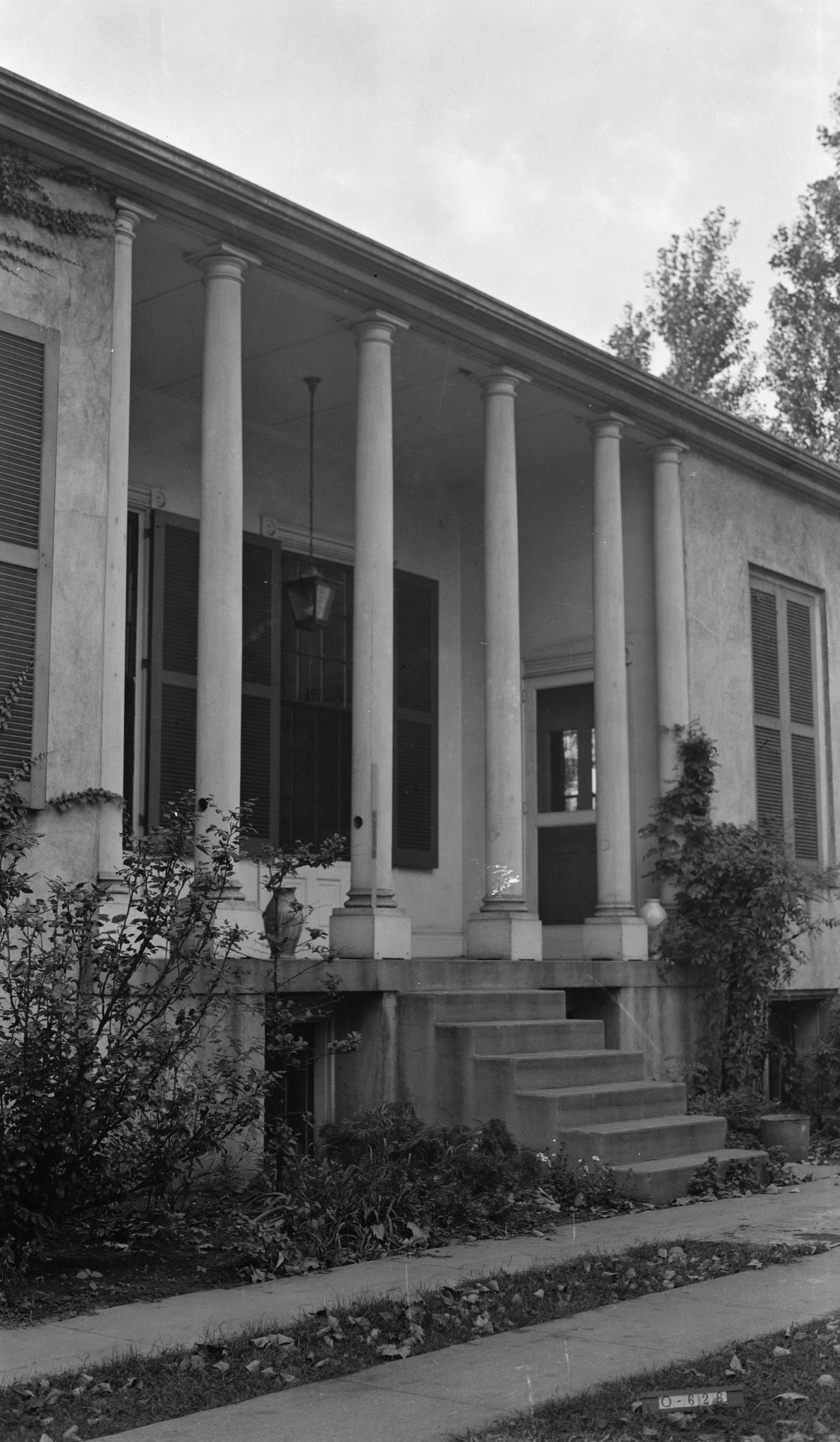
- Entrance to the house

- Location within Kentucky Location within the United States
- Location: 244-246 Forest Ave., Ludlow, Kentucky
- Coordinates: 39°5′42″N 84°32′56″W
- Area: 9 acres (3.6 ha)
- Built: 1818
- Built by: Thomas Carneal
- Architect: Benjamin Latrobe
- NRHP reference No.: 72000541
- Added to NRHP: August 7, 1972

Elmwood Hall is a historic residence in Ludlow, located in the Kentucky portions of the Cincinnati metropolitan area in the United States. Located atop a prominent Ohio River vantage point, it has been named a historic site.

== History ==
Thomas Carneal was among the first men of early Kenton County. He established his name as one of the founders of the nearby city of Covington, where in 1816 he built the city's first brick house. Both the Covington house (now known as the Carneal House) and Elmwood Hall dominate the surrounding neighborhoods like manor houses. When the city of Ludlow was founded, it was a planned community whose owners had conceived a detailed plan for the whole settlement, with the goal of drawing élite residents. If Carneal's plan were to contribute to this goal by setting community standards with his two houses, he failed in Ludlow, but he succeeded in Covington, where his residence today sits at the core of the Riverside Drive Historic District.

During some of the house's earliest years, it was home to a locally prominent politician; Carneal won election to the Kentucky General Assembly later in his life. Since that time, the house has served a range of purposes: among its other residents have been English naturalist William Bullock and Israel Ludlow, whose father Israel was the city's namesake and had helped to found Cincinnati.

== Architecture ==
Designed by nationally prominent architect Benjamin Henry Latrobe, Elmwood Hall sits atop a hill, and from its octagonal cupola and widow's walk, one may see many miles along the Ohio River either to the east or to the west. The house's front faces the river to the north, featuring a grand double door with fanlight, sidelights, a tall staircase, and carven trim, but all of the house's other sides also include extensive detailing. Both sides encompass porches with railings and six narrow columns. The building is topped with a hip roof rising to the widow's walk, which is surrounded by a railing identical to the ones found on the porches. Extensive original woodworking survives without substantial changes, and virtually all other woodwork, including the doors and the window frames, also remain with little damage.

Some of the original exterior walls have been modified; for example, some of the brick exterior walls have been covered with cement plaster, while the western porch has been converted into a bay window in order to expand the interior space, although the original columns have been saved. The foundation is of limestone, carefully dressed. Like the exterior walls, most of the interior walls are brick, while some framing is yellow poplar with occasional pine floorboards in addition to the extensive ash on the floors and in the lintels.

== Preservation ==
By the late twentieth century, the house had been converted for commercial use, becoming the offices of the Thomas Candy Company. Despite the radical change in its uses, the house remains in fine condition. Although the original ash floors are no longer easily visible, this is purely because of a protective covering that the candy company installed to prevent damage from foot traffic and its machinery. In recognition of its exceptional degree of preservation, the house was listed on the National Register of Historic Places in August 1972; it was the second location in Kenton County to be given this distinction, although more than sixty different locations in the county now possess it, including the Riverside Drive Historic District in which Carneal's other house is located.

In 2019, the Kentucky Historical Society will install a historical marker at the site.
