= Riverside Historic District =

Riverside Historic District may refer to:

- Riverside Historic District (Jacksonsville, Florida), listed on the NRHP in Florida
- Riverside Historic District (Riverside, Illinois), a National Historic Landmark District in Illinois
- Riverside Historic District (Evansville, Indiana), listed on the NRHP in Indiana
- Riverside Historic District (Muncie, Indiana), listed on the NRHP in Indiana
- Licking Riverside Historic District, Covington, Kentucky, listed on the NRHP in Kentucky
- Riverside Drive Historic District, Covington, Kentucky, listed on the NRHP in Kentucky
- Riverside Historic District (Baltimore, Maryland), listed on the NRHP in Maryland
- Riverside, Charles County, Maryland, listed in the Maryland Inventory of Historic Properties
- Riverside Historic District (Elizabeth City, North Carolina), listed on the NRHP in North Carolina
- Riverside Historic District (New Bern, North Carolina), listed on the NRHP in North Carolina
- Riverside Historic Residential District, listed on the NRHP in Tulsa County, Oklahoma

== See also ==
- Riverside Drive–West 80th–81st Streets Historic District, listed on the NRHP in New York
- Riverside–West 105th Street Historic District, listed on the NRHP in New York
