= Fort Mitchell Site =

Fort Mitchell Site may refer to:

- Fort Mitchell Historic Site, in Fort Mitchell, Alabama, an archeological site listed on the National Register of Historic Places in Russell County, Alabama
- Fort Mitchell Heights Historic District, Fort Mitchell, Kentucky, listed on the National Register of Historic Places in Kenton County, Kentucky
- Old Fort Mitchell Historic District, Fort Mitchell, Kentucky, listed on the National Register of Historic Places in Kenton County, Kentucky
- Fort Mitchell Site (Scottsbluff, Nebraska), listed on the National Register of Historic Places in Scotts Bluff County, Nebraska
