= West Fifteenth Street Historic District =

West Fifteenth Street Historic District may refer to:

- West Fifteenth Street Historic District (Anniston, Alabama), listed on the National Register of Historic Places in Calhoun County, Alabama
- West Fifteenth Street Historic District (Covington, Kentucky), listed on the National Register of Historic Places in Kenton County, Kentucky
