= Riverside Drive =

Riverside Drive may refer to:

- Riverside Drive (Lake Elsinore, California)
- Riverside Drive (Los Angeles)
- Riverside Drive (Manhattan)
- Riverside Drive Historic District, Covington, Kentucky
- Riverside Drive (London, Ontario)
- Riverside Drive (Ottawa)
- Riverside Drive (Windsor, Ontario)
- Riverside Drive, Perth, Western Australia
