= William Grant High School =

Public high school in Kentucky

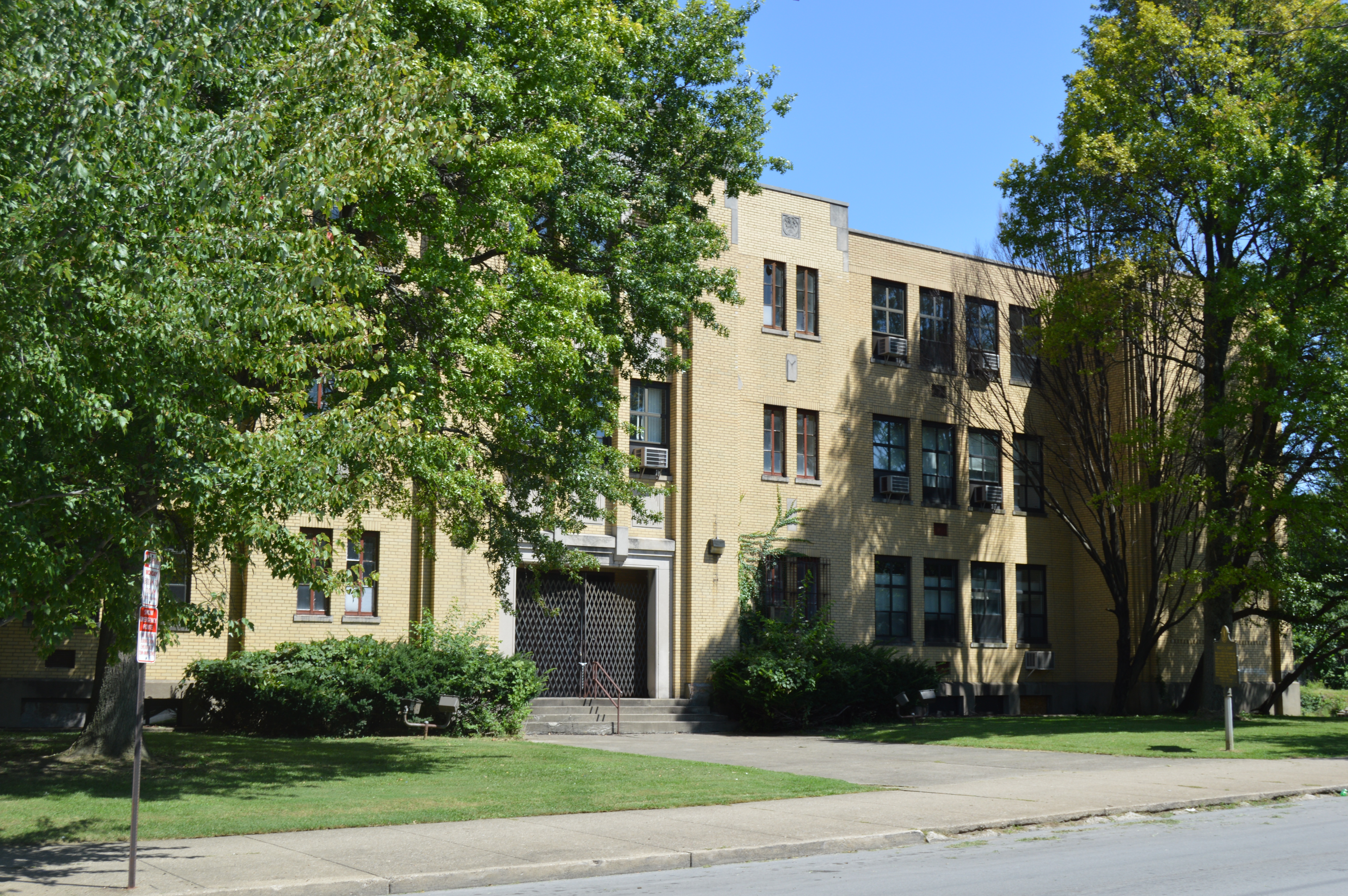
Lincoln-Grant School building at 824 Greenup Street

William Grant High School was a public high school for African Americans in Covington, Kentucky. It also served African American students from surrounding areas who were not allowed to attend the whites-only schools in the county. The elementary and secondary schools that became known as Lincoln-Grant School were in a school built on 7th Street until they were relocated to a new building at 824 Greenup. The school closed after desegregation and its students transferred to Holmes High School, The elementary school continued on until 1976. The Northern Kentucky Community Center occupied the school after it closed. In 2017 it became the Lincoln Grant Scholar House housing single parents with low incomes. Joseph M. Walton's The Life and Legacy of Lincoln School, Covington, Kentucky, 1866-1976 was published in 2010. He graduated from the school with honors in 1958. The school was listed on the National Register of Historic Places in 2013. It is in the Emery-Price Historic District.

== History ==
Schools for African Americans were established in Covington after the American Civil War at local churches. Jacob Price, a local religious leader and businessman, helped lead efforts to establish the schools for African Americans. In 1876 the schools began receiving public funds from the city.

Samuel Reynolds Singer, an Oberlin College graduate, helped establish William Grant High School in 1886 and served as its principal. Seventh Street Colored School was built in 1888. The land at 25 East 7th Street was donated by Colonel William Letcher Grant and an elementary and secondary school used the building. A historical marker commemorates his legacy.

In 1909 the elementary school was renamed Lincoln School. The Lincoln-Grant School was a hyphenation of the elementary school, Lincoln School (named for President Abraham Lincoln), and William Grant High School (named for Colonel William Letcher Grant who donated the land and advocated for the schools.

A study of student progress at the school was done from 1918 to 1929. The school was part of the Association of Colleges and Secondary Schools for Negroes’ Secondary School Study.

In 1929 the school's football team was Kentucky African American State Football Champions. Paul Redden coached.

The school moved to 824 Greenup Street in 1932. Football was discontinued. Clarence Cameron White visited the school and the community in 1938.

== Principals ==
- John S. McLeod (1871–1879)
- Darius L. V. Moffet (1879–1881)
- Samuel L. Singer (1881–1900)
- Frank L. Williams (1901–1908)
- William Henry Fouse (1908–1912)
- Robert Yancey (1913–1926)
- Henry R. Merry (acting 1923–1924, 1926–1955), a graduate of Fisk University in Nashville, Tennessee
- Charles L. Lett (1955–1963), a graduate of Kentucky State College
- Matthew L. Mastin (1963–1972), high school closed in 1965
- James K. Burns (1972–1976)

== Alumni ==
- Francis Marion Russell, principal of high schools
- John "Jack" Delaney, funeral home owner with his mother, lawyer, and magistrate
- Tom Thacker, basketball player
- James E. Simpson Jr., local politician and community leader

== See also ==
- Southgate Street School in Newport, Kentucky
- List of African-American historic places
- National Register of Historic Places listings in Kenton County, Kentucky
- Covington Independent Public Schools
