= Anne Lee Patterson =

Miss United States 1931

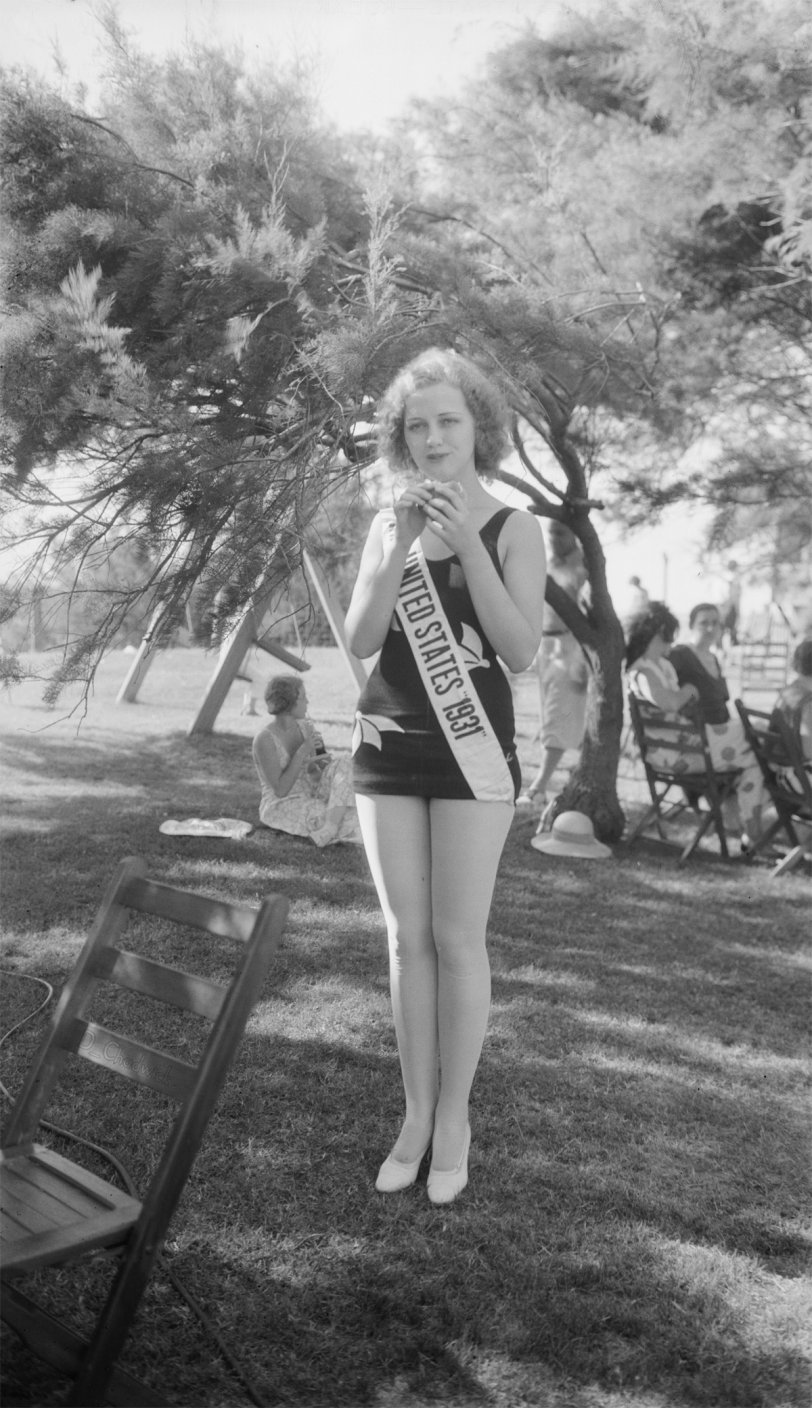
- Born: October 20, 1912; Ludlow, Kentucky
- Died: December 13, 2003 (aged 91); Bel Air, California
- Burial place: Hillside Memorial Park, Culver City, California
- Known for: Miss United States 1931
- Height: 5 ft 5 in (165 cm)
- Spouse: Joseph Bandler
- Children: 2

Anne Lee Patterson (October 20, 1912 – December 13, 2003) was a model, actress, and dancer who was crowned Miss United States in 1931.

== Early life ==
Anne Lee Patterson was born on October 20, 1912, in Ludlow, Kentucky. Her parents were John W. Patterson, a railroad worker and Ann Patterson. She was educated at St. James Elementary School and LaSalette Academy. After graduating high school, she worked for a soft drink company in Covington, Kentucky.

== Career ==
In 1931, at the age of 18, Anne Lee Paterson was crowned Miss Northern Kentucky. That same year, she was also crowned Miss United States with Dorothy Lamour as runner up and was later runner up in the Miss Universe contest. During the summer of 1931, Patterson relocated to New York City and appeared in Ziegfeld Follies and in the revival of the Broadway musical Show Boat. In June 1932, Patterson visited her hometown of Ludlow where the city sponsored a parade in her honor. A couple hundred people attended and several bands played. The parade was followed by a community reception at the city building.

In 1936, she married Joseph Bandler and retired from show business. The couple moved to Bel Air, California, and had two sons, Joseph Jr. and Robert. They remained married until Joseph's death in 1993.

== Death and legacy ==
On December 12, 2003, Patterson died from natural causes at the age of 91 and was buried at the Hillside Memorial Park in Culver City, California.

On November 17, 2013, Robert Bandler was fatally shot by police in a confrontation at the home Patterson and her husband had lived in.

== Gallery ==
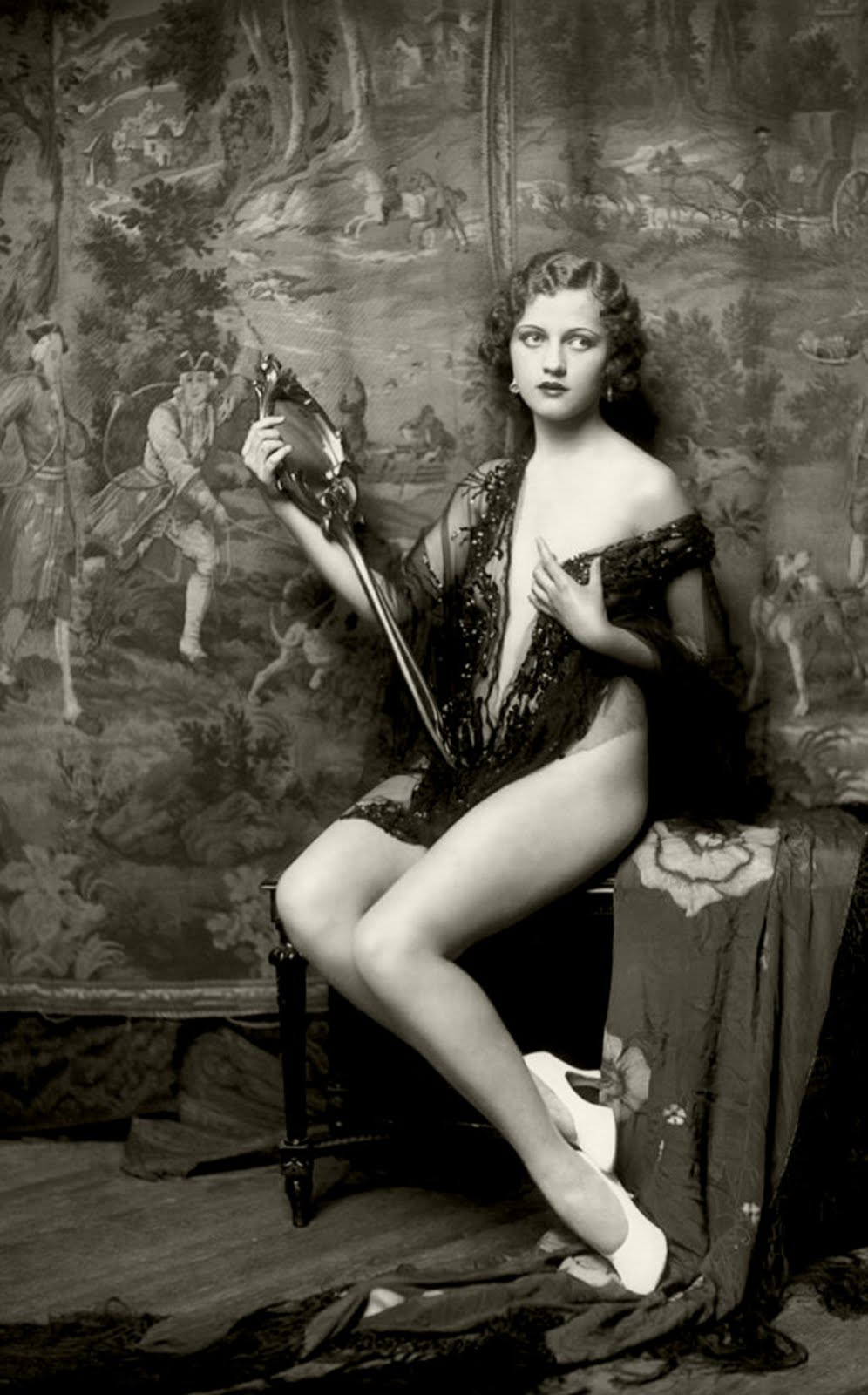

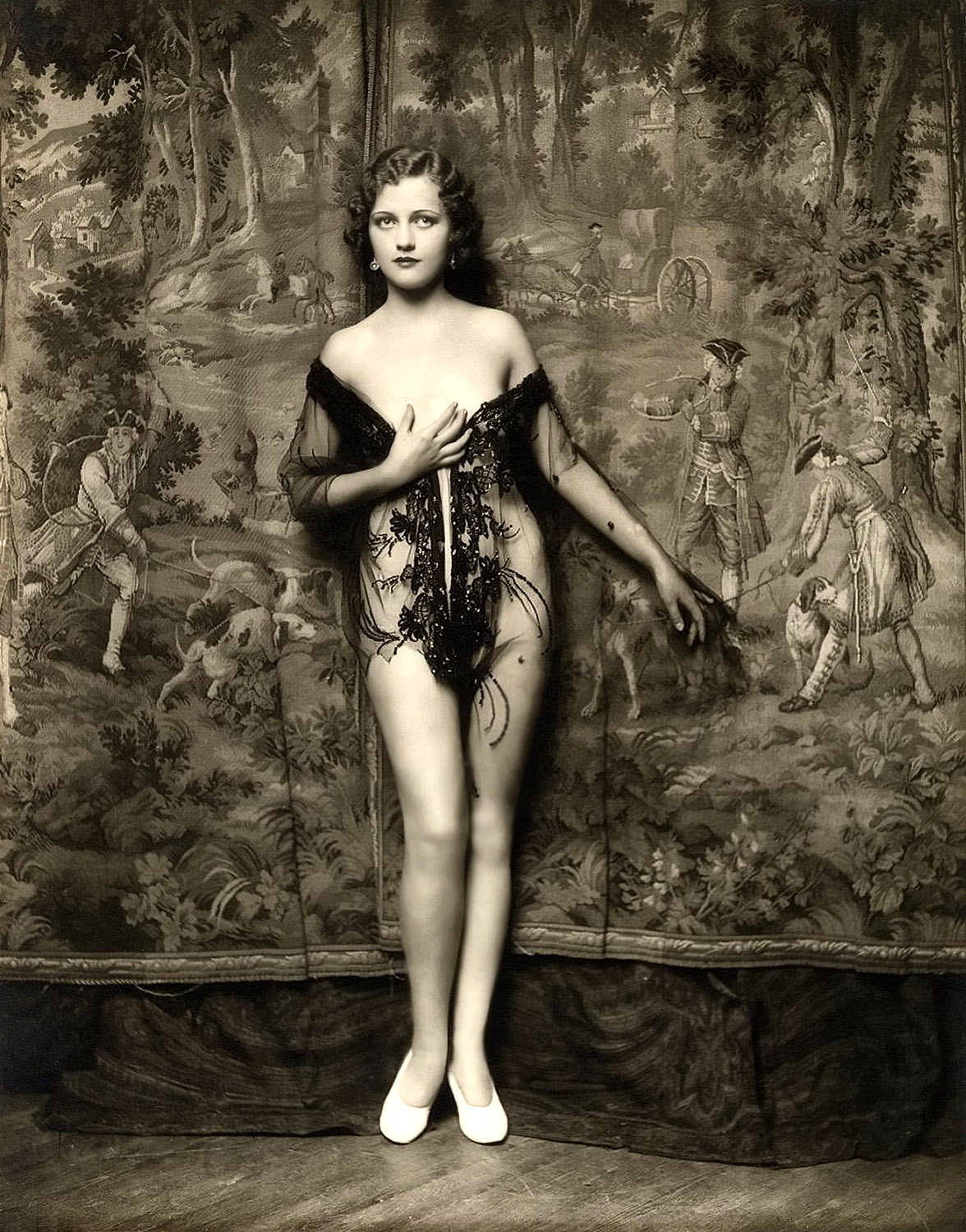

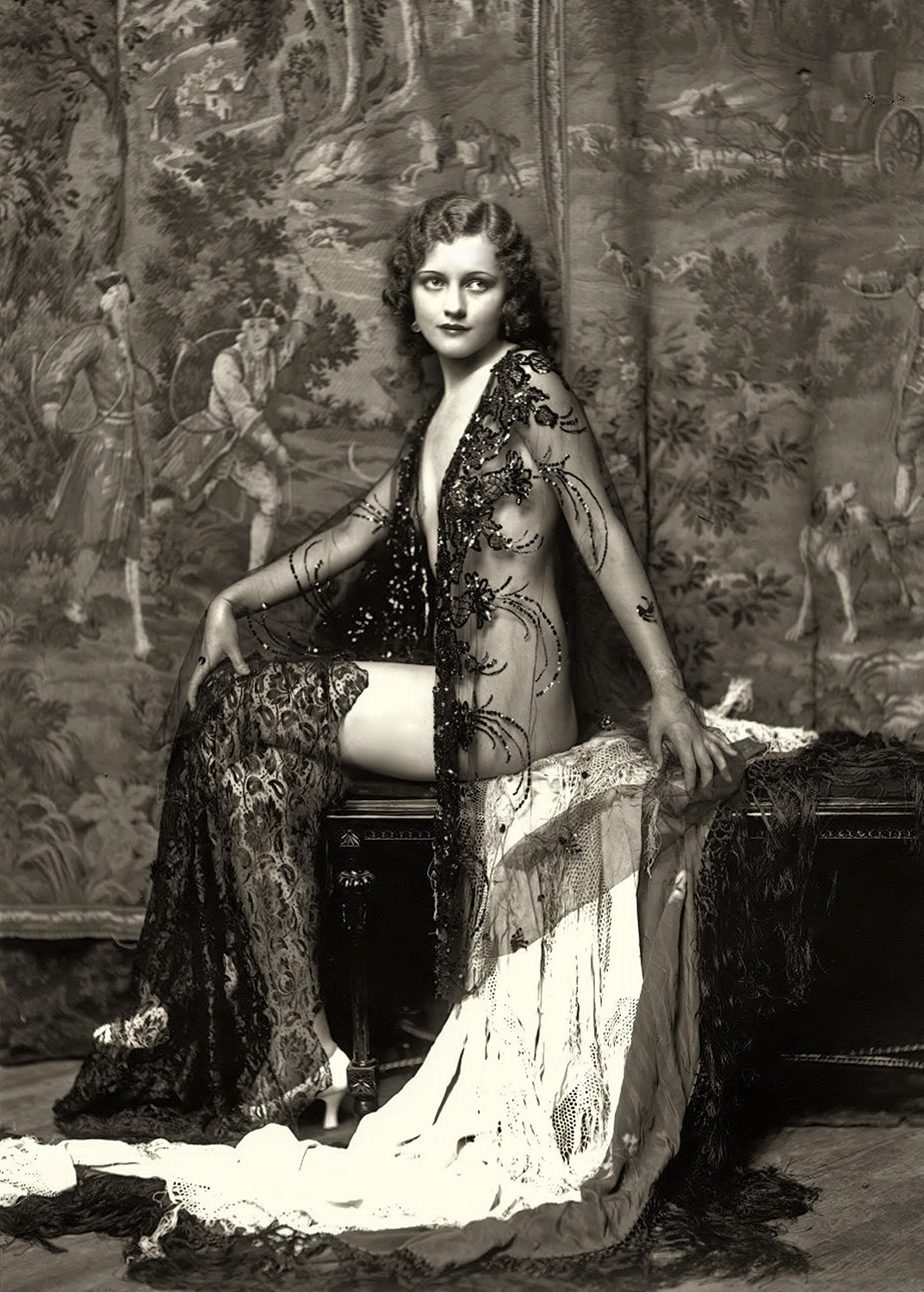
