= Linden Grove Cemetery =

United States historic place in Kentucky

- U.S. National Register of Historic Places
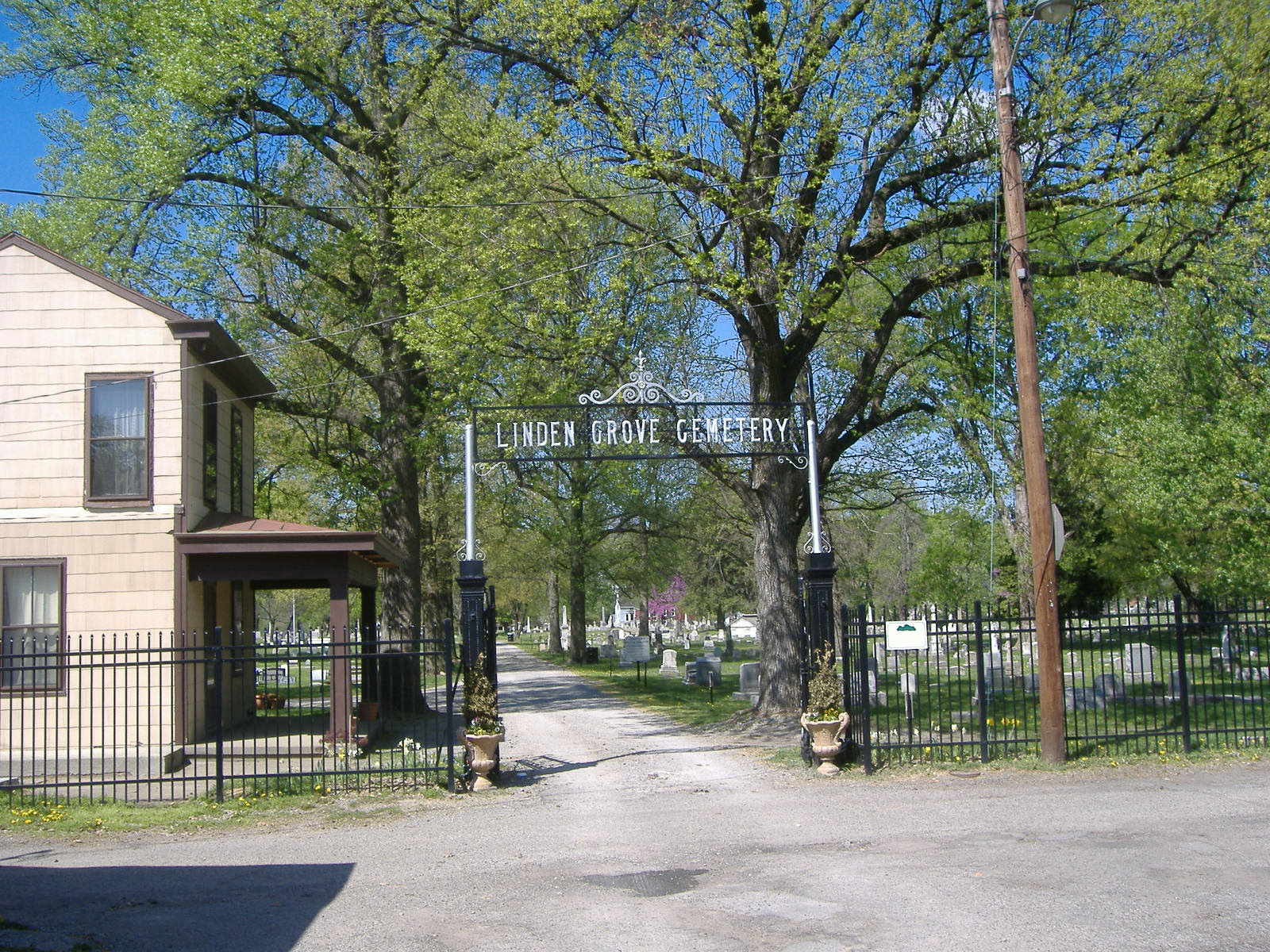
- Gate to the cemetery

- Location within Kentucky Location within the United States
- Location: Covington, Kentucky
- Coordinates: 39.0742°N 84.5151°W
- Built: 1843
- Architectural style: Late Victorian
- NRHP reference No.: 00001600
- Added to NRHP: January 4, 2001

Linden Grove Cemetery is located along Holman Street, between 13th and 15th streets in Covington, Kentucky, United States. It is the second public cemetery in Covington, the city's first public burial ground being Craig Street Cemetery, which dates to 1815. Craig Street Cemetery closed in 1872. Most of the bodies were moved to Linden Grove.

Trustees of the nearby Western Baptist Theological Institute which was formed to train Baptist ministers founded the cemetery in 1842, and from the beginning allowed burials without regard to race or religion. The Western Baptist Theological Institute had been formed in 1833 to train Baptist ministers and at one time its grounds covered several hundred acres.

Some accounts say burials at Linden Grove began in 1842, but the Licking Valley Register reported on September 9, 1843, that elaborate plans had been proposed for dedicating "this beautiful spot of ground" on September 11. Plans called for music and talks by ministers and groups from Presbyterian, Episcopal and Methodist churches in Covington.

The writer described Linden Grove as about "60 acres of high table land, overlooking the city of Cincinnati and situated in the midst of the most quiet and romantic scenery." The newspaper reporter concluded, "A place like this, in the vicinity of Cincinnati, would be thronged with the admirers of nature and art thus happily combined." A later account said a large crowd attended the dedication ceremonies.

As early as May 1851, The Covington Journal was cautioning lot owners to get more involved in the operation of the cemetery and warned that indifference was sure to lead to problems. Another Covington Journal account on May 1, 1858, noted that since its opening, Linden Grove had had more than 2,000 burials. Especially heavy years were 1850 and 1851, when cholera swept through the area. Those years there were more than 260 burials, compared to 160 in most other years.

Vandalism had become enough of a problem by 1859 that newspaper advertisements were run in the Covington Journal warning of fines of $5 to $50 for damaging grave sites. By 1868, Covington Journal accounts said another public burial site might soon be needed for Covington. The December 26 story said the Craig Street site had been full for several years and Linden Grove was quickly filling up. Highland Cemetery in Fort Mitchell would later be dedicated on June 26, 1869, to handle those needs.

Alben Barkley, the former Vice President and U.S. senator, was the guest speaker at the 1953 Memorial Day ceremonies at Linden Grove. The Norman-Barnes Post of the American Legion served as Barkley's escort during the ceremonies. That Covington post later sponsored placement of a marker dedicated to Civil War veterans buried at Linden Grove.

Among those moved to Linden Grove was Thomas Kennedy, one of the founders of Covington. The cemetery's residents also include three former Northern Kentucky congressmen, including John G. Carlisle, namesake of an elementary school in Covington; William Wright Southgate; John W. Menzies; and William Evans Arthur.

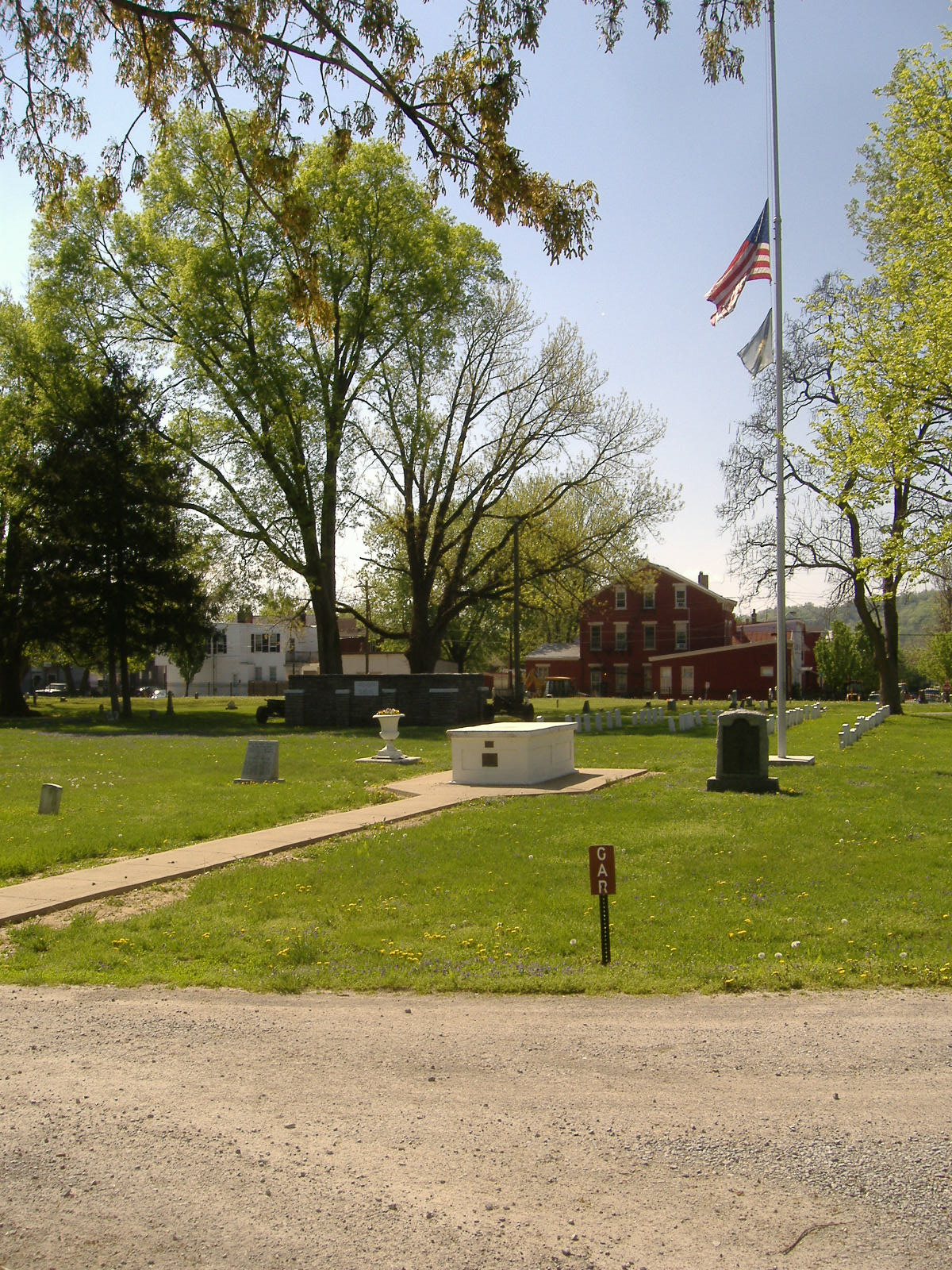
GAR Monument in Covington (front) and Veteran's Monument in Covington (back)

Linden Grove is the resting place of many Civil War veterans, including eighteen in colored units of the United States Army. Union and Confederate soldiers are buried facing each other in uniform rows. Two monuments to the war, the Veteran's Monument in Covington and the GAR Monument in Covington, are inside the cemetery, and like the cemetery, are on the National Register of Historic Places.

The cemetery has been in receivership for half a century, with the city and Kenton County charged with overseeing it.

On September 8, 2006, the Kentucky Governor's Office of Local Development announced a grant of $23,863.00, to be combined with $44,000.00 from the City of Covington, $22,000.00 from the Kenton County Fiscal Court and $5,500.00 from the Cemetery. These monies will be used for new fencing on West 13th Street and Linden Avenue.

In 2003, $25,000 from the Cemetery Preservation Fund and $85,000 in local money was used to replace fencing along Kavanaugh Street.
