= Emery Row =

Historic residential building in Kentucky, United States

- U.S. National Register of Historic Places
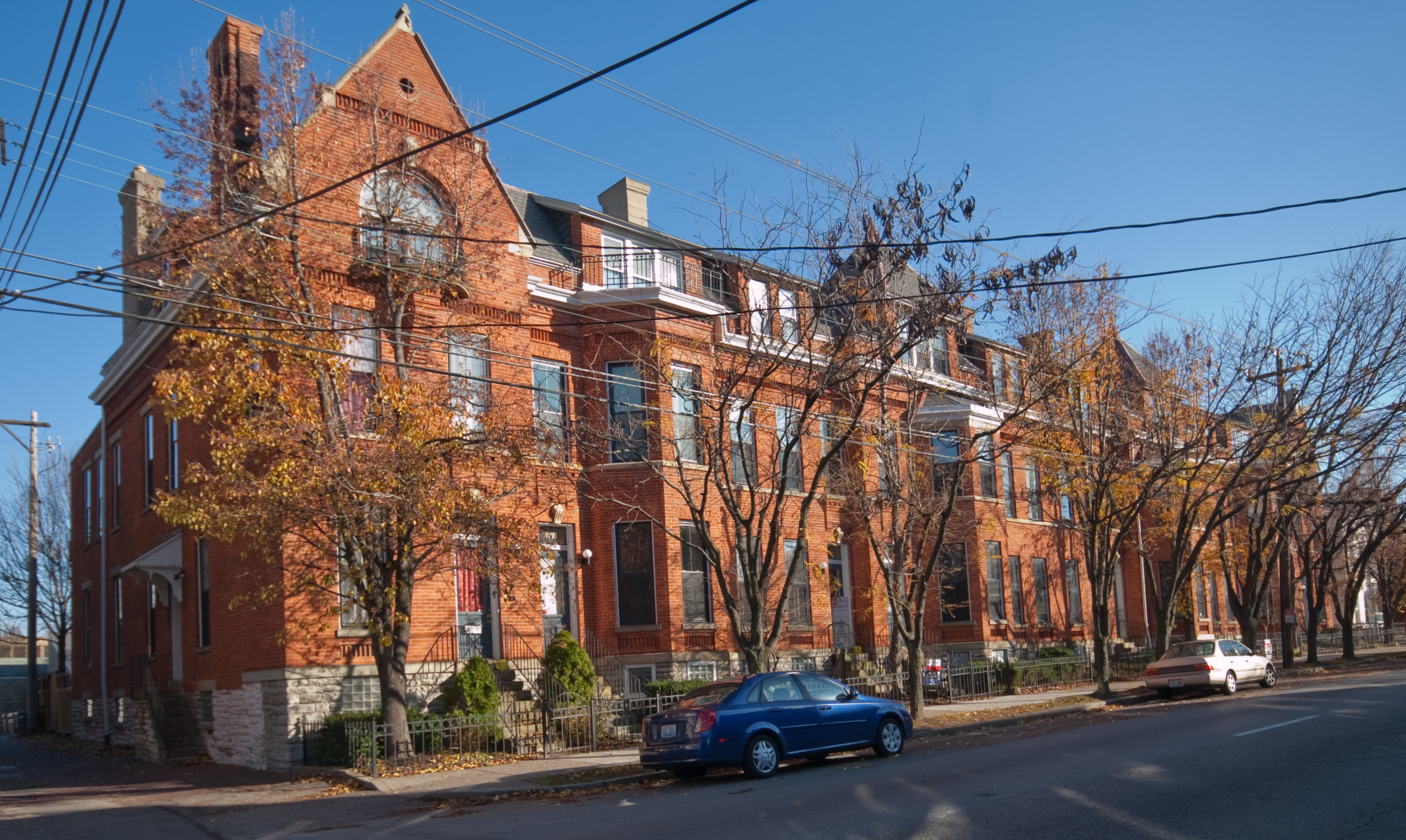

- Location within Kentucky Location within the United States
- Location: 810-828 Scott Blvd.Covington, Kentucky
- Coordinates: 38°59′30″N 84°30′42″W
- Area: 0.4 acres (0.16 ha)
- Built: c. 1880
- Architect: Samuel Hannaford
- Architectural style: Queen Anne
- NRHP reference No.: 85002820
- Added to NRHP: November 14, 1985

Emery Row is a historic building in Covington, Kentucky, United States, that is listed on the National Register of Historic Places. It is an example of design attributable to the regionally significant architect Samuel Hannaford, of Cincinnati, and illustrates the Queen Anne style architecture in the United States as executed in multiple-family housing units.

The housing units are situated on portions of Lots 24 and 25 of the Western Baptist Theological Sub-Division (later known as Old Seminary Square Historic District), in Covington. The lots were purchased in 1841 by John Taylor, who sold them post Civil War to Charles Reeves and John Mackoy. In mid-1879, the lots were acquired by Thomas J. and Joseph J. Emery, believed to be the sons of Cincinnati industrialist, Thomas Emery.

A number of prominent Covington citizens lived in these residences including Thomas H. Kennedy, the city's civil engineer and descendant of Thomas Kennedy whose 150-acre (61 ha) farm became the original town of Covington in the early 19th century.
