= Mother of God Roman Catholic Church (Covington, Kentucky) =

Historic church in Kentucky, United States

- Mother Of God Roman Catholic Church
- U.S. National Register of Historic Places
- U.S. Historic district – Contributing property
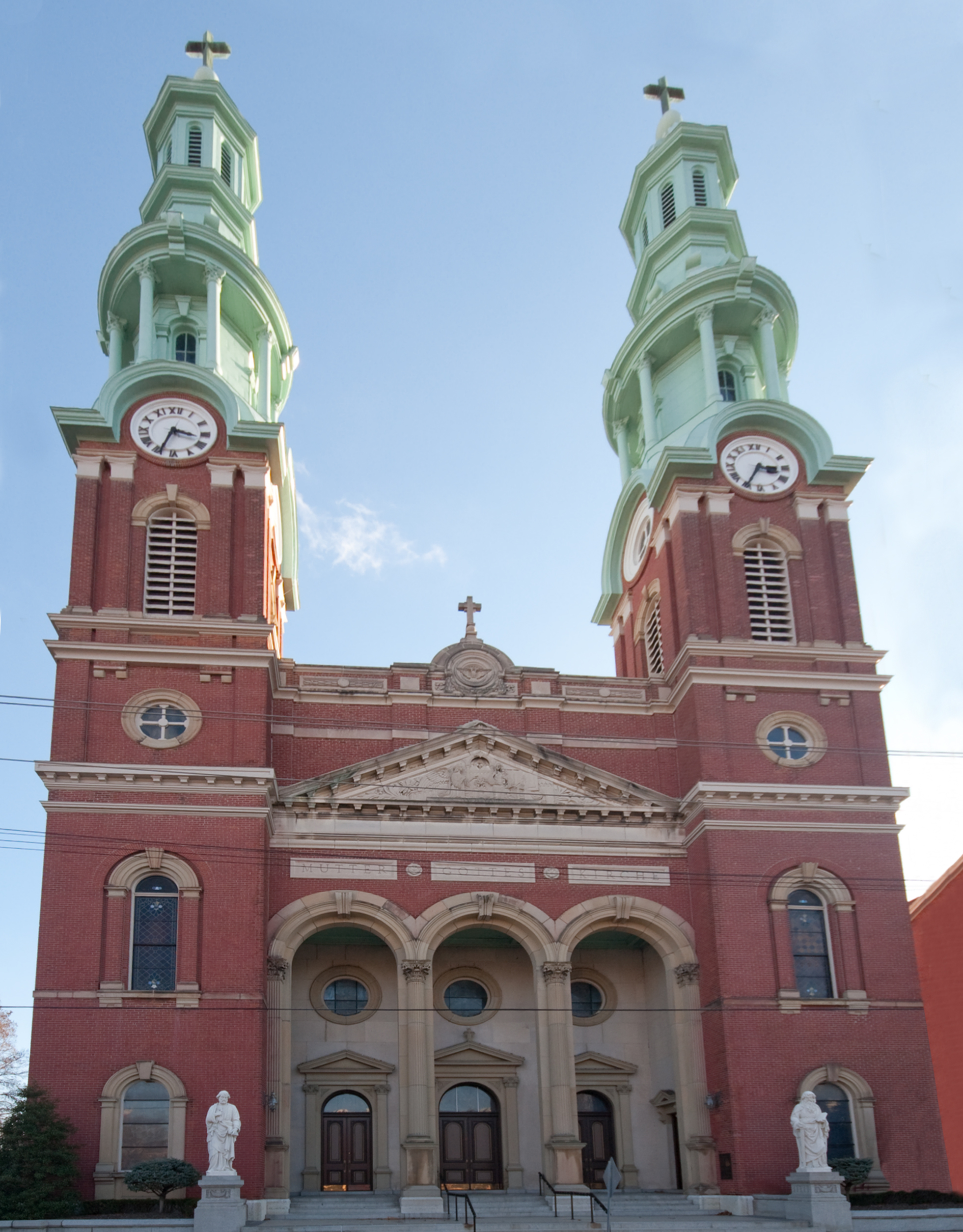
- Location: 119 W. 6th St., Covington, Kentucky
- Coordinates: 39°05′02″N 84°30′45″W
- Area: 10 acres (4.0 ha)
- Built: 1869
- Architect: Walter & Stewart William Walter, of Cincinnati and Wm. Stewart of Covington, Kentucky. 1865-1870
- Architectural style: Renaissance
- Part of: Mutter Gottes Historic District (ID80004499)
- NRHP reference No.: 73000813

Significant dates
- Added to NRHP: July 24, 1973
- Designated CP: May 29, 1980

Mother of God Parish (German: Mutter Gottes Kirche) is a parish church of the Roman Catholic Diocese of Covington, Kentucky, United States, located at 119 West 6th Street in Covington. The official title of the parish is The Annunciation of the Ever Virgin Mary, Mother of God. The church was listed on the National Register of Historic Places in 1973. It was also included in the Mutter Gottes Historic District which was listed on the National Register in 1980.

This historic church features twin renaissance towers and murals by famous Vatican artist Johann Schmitt, an early teacher of Frank Duveneck, who was baptized in the parish in 1848.

== History ==
In the spring of 1842, the German congregation purchased a lot at the southwest corner of 6th and Washington streets. On this lot, a new church was constructed. Bishop Flaget of the Diocese of Louisville laid the cornerstone on April 14, 1842. The church was dedicated by the same bishop on October 10, 1842. The new church was brick and measured 100 x 50 feet. Transepts were added to the structure in 1851.

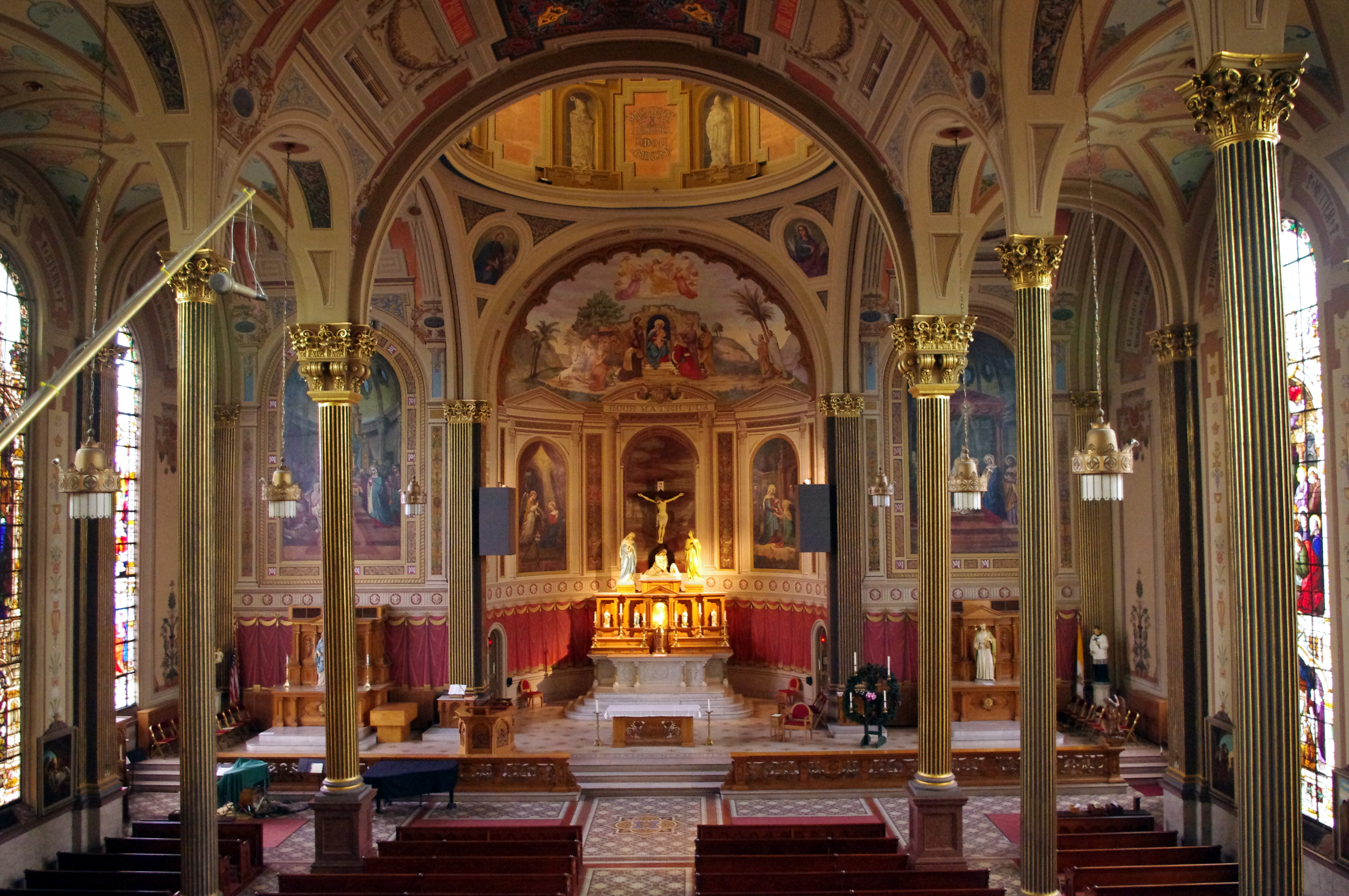
The church nave as seen from the organ loft.

By the late 1860s the church building, not yet 30 years old, was already overcrowded. Planning therefore began for the construction of a new Mother of God Church. The old church building was demolished and ground was broken for the new Italian Renaissance Revival structure, according to the plans, which were drawn by Walter & Stewart, of Cincinnati, the new edifice was said to be the largest and finest in Covington at that time. Cincinnati Enquirer - 26 Oct 1869, Tue., p.7 The cornerstone of the new church was set in place on July 3, 1870, and the building was dedicated on September 10, 1871. The new Mother of God Church sported a large portico supported by four Corinthian columns, two large towers and a central dome topped with a lantern and cupola. In 1875 a magnificent Koehnken Organ was installed in the church balcony.

In 1891, the congregation celebrated the Silver Jubilee of the establishment of the parish. In preparation for this event, the interior of the church was completely remodeled. Additions included five large murals by Johann Schmitt, new hand-carved wood altars by the Schroder Brothers of Cincinnati and two imported stained glass windows from Mayer & Company of Munich.

On March 10, 1986, a tornado swept through Covington damaging the cupola of Mother of God Church. The congregation quickly rallied to rebuild the structure. However, while the structure was being repaired, welders accidentally set the dome on fire. Ultimately, the building was restored to its 1890 appearance at a cost of over a million dollars. The parish school merged with St John School, St Ann School, and Sts Boniface And James School in 1984 to form Prince Of Peace Academy housed at St John.

Preceded by unknown	Tallest Building in Kentucky; 1871-1910	Succeeded by Kentucky State Capitol
