= Odd Fellows Hall (Covington, Kentucky) =

- U.S. National Register of Historic Places
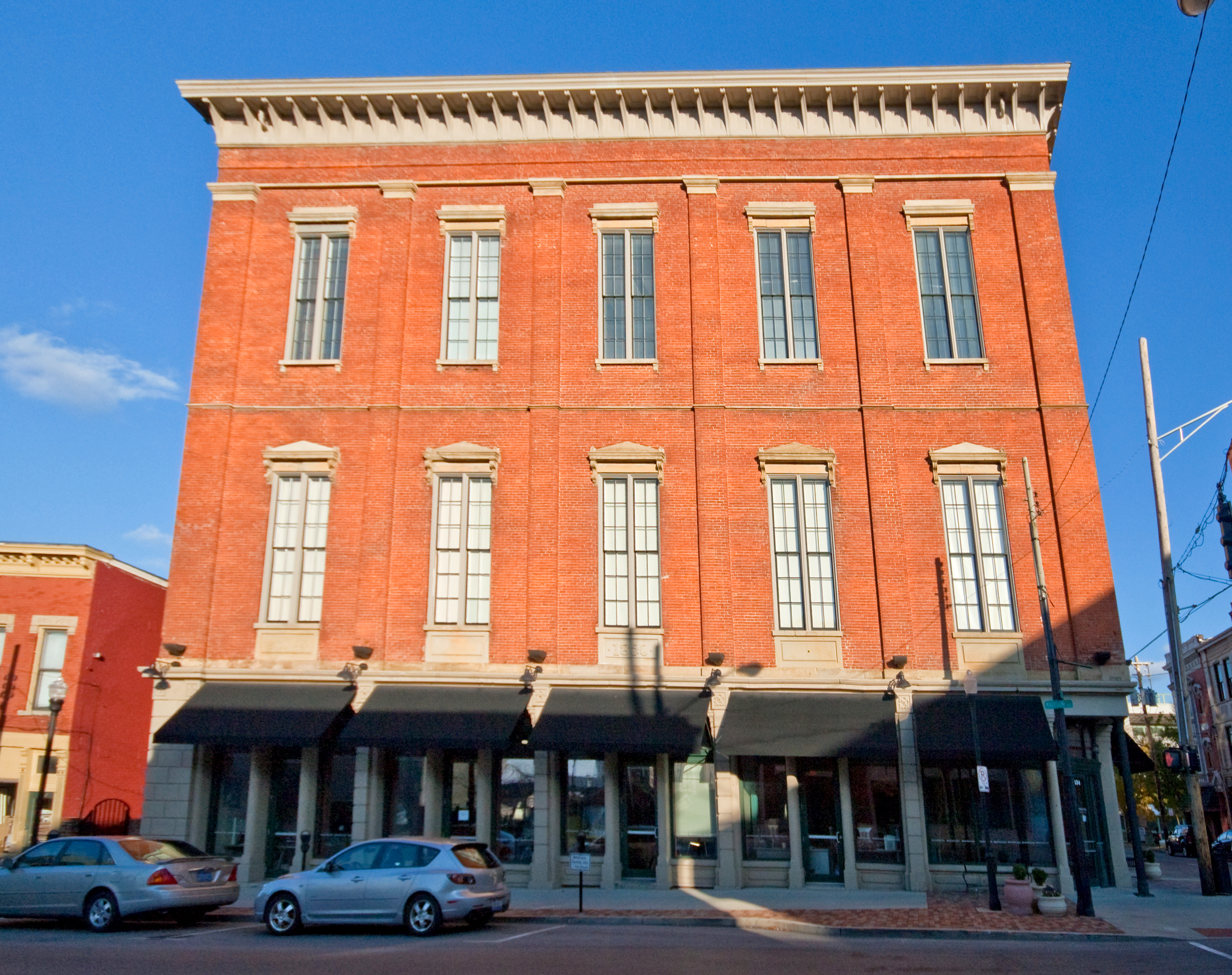
- The building's facade in 2010

- Location within Kentucky Location within the United States
- Location: 5th and Madison Sts., Covington, Kentucky
- Coordinates: 39°05′9.07″N 84°30′37.75″W
- Area: less than one acre
- Built: 1856
- Architect: Gedge & Bros.
- NRHP reference No.: 80001646
- Added to NRHP: August 11, 1980

The Odd Fellows Hall in Covington, Kentucky is located at the northeast corner of Fifth Street and Madison Avenue. It was constructed in 1856 by the Independent Order of Odd Fellows Lodge, and was the center of Covington's civic and political life for most of the Victorian era. When the American Civil War ended, victorious Union Gen. Ulysses S. Grant was honored with a reception there.

In 1900, the body of William Goebel, the only U.S. governor to be assassinated in office, lay in state there, as an estimated 10,000 people filed past.

In the 1950s, a roller skating rink filled the second-floor ballroom, famous for its 25-foot (7.6 m)-high ceiling suspended by a truss system.

It was listed on the National Register of Historic Places in 1980. It was deemed notable as "one of the city's earliest commercial structures." The building was assessed to be "especially noteworthy in the method of construction. In order to accommodate large, unbroken interior spaces, iron tie rods were employed to support the floors. In addition to its architectural distinction, the structure is a well-known local landmark having served as the center for both civic and social activities in downtown Covington."

In May 2002, a major fire almost destroyed the entire building. It was reduced to its front facade, back wall, and a three-story column of smoke and charred debris. A new team has restored the hall, with its first tenant taking occupancy in March 2006.
