= GAR Monument in Covington =

- U.S. National Register of Historic Places
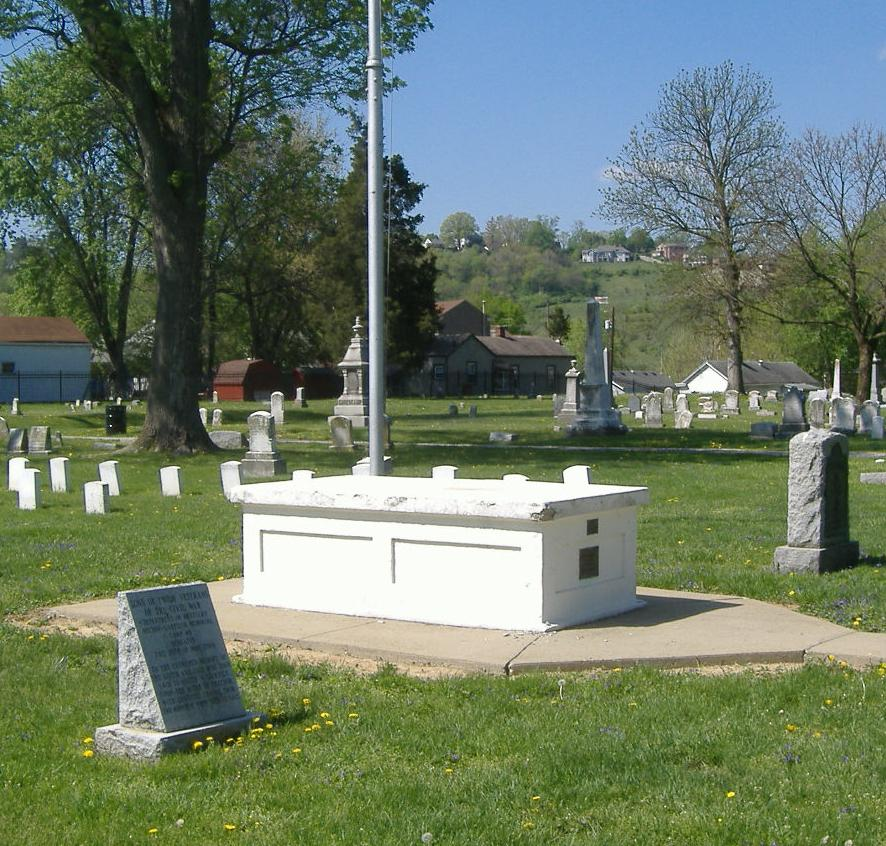
- North side of monument

- Location within Kentucky Location within the United States
- Location: Covington, Kentucky
- Built: 1929
- MPS: Civil War Monuments of Kentucky MPS
- NRHP reference No.: 97000684
- Added to NRHP: July 17, 1997

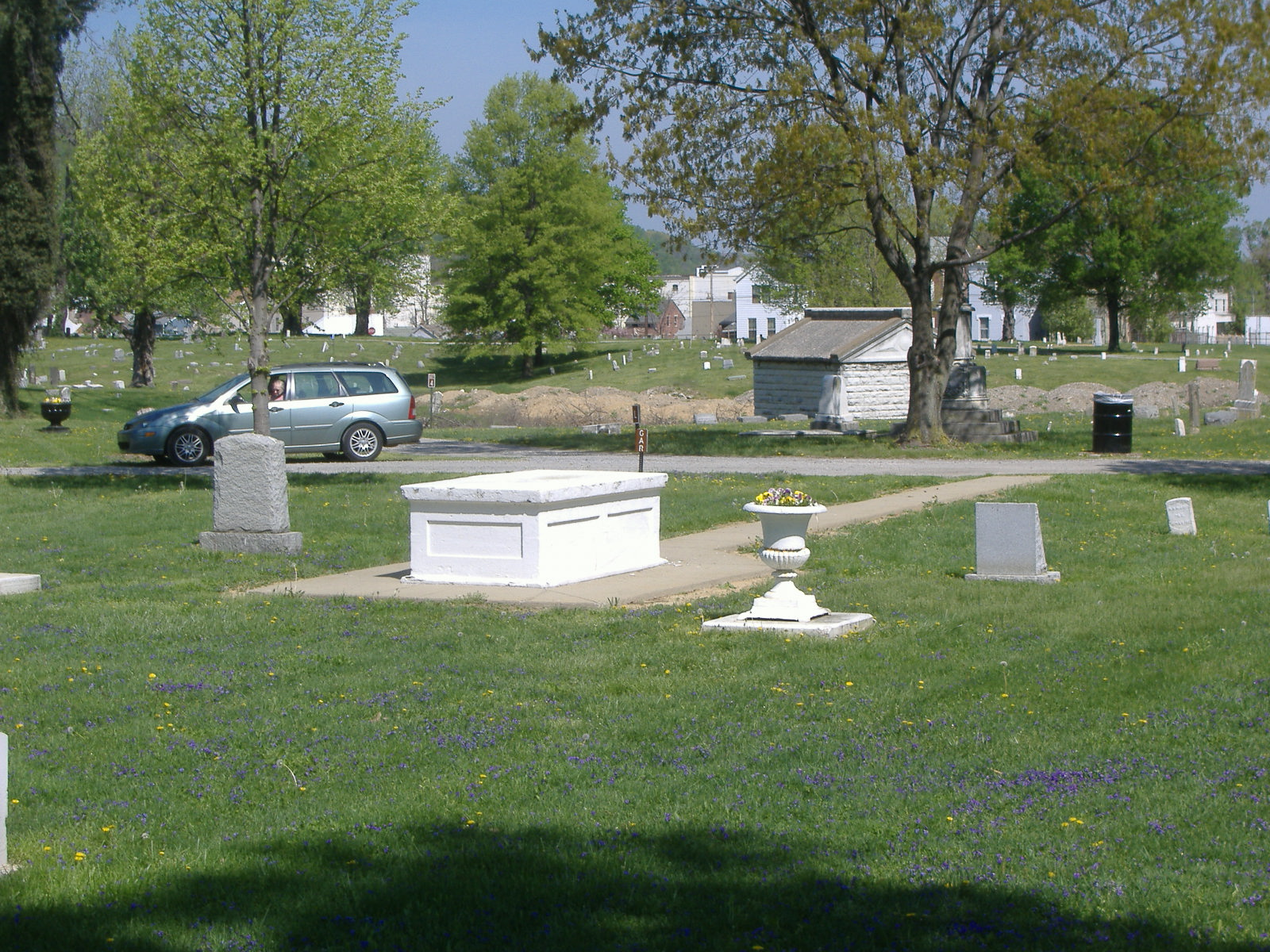
South side of monument

The Grand Army of the Republic Monument, in the Linden Grove Cemetery of Covington, Kentucky, was built in 1929 by O. P. Sine of Garfield Post No. 2 of the Grand Army of the Republic, a group comprising the remaining veterans of the Union army.

This was the second memorial built by the Grand Army of the Republic in the commonwealth of Kentucky, with the first being built in Kentucky's capital city of Frankfort, Kentucky, the Colored Soldiers Monument in Frankfort. Most GAR monuments are built in courthouse squares, but both in Kentucky are in cemeteries. By the time interest in building such memorials to the Civil War had waned; most G.A.R. had been built long before Covington's. It is the only monument related to the war in Kentucky shaped like a sarcophagus. It measures three feet high, three feet tall, and is ten feet long. It is made of concrete, and was painted white. In 1926 the James A. Garfield Post of the G.A.R. asked to have a cannon placed in Linden Grove. Senator Richard P. Ernst came through with a 35 millimeter cannon from World War I. In 1929 Oliver Perry Sine, a member of the G.A.R. veterans group, built a pedestal on which to place the cannon along with a flag pole, a flower stand and a temporary podium. At some point the cannon was either stolen or scrapped during World War II. The pedestal then became the monument and is on the national register. Most monuments to the War in Kentucky were made to honor Confederate soldiers/veterans/memories. Though many regions in the state were pro-Union during the war, by Reconstruction Kenton County, Kentucky was one of the few places in Kentucky where sentiment was still decidedly pro-Union, which is why the Grand Army of the Republic chose Covington in particular for this monument.

On July 17, 1997, it was one of sixty different monuments to the Civil War in Kentucky placed on the National Register of Historic Places, as part of the Civil War Monuments of Kentucky Multiple Property Submission. It is a few feet from the Veteran's Monument in Covington, which was also on the same MPS, but was built four years after the G.A.R. Monument was.
