= Mutter Gottes Historic District =

Historic district in Kentucky, United States

- U.S. National Register of Historic Places
- U.S. Historic district
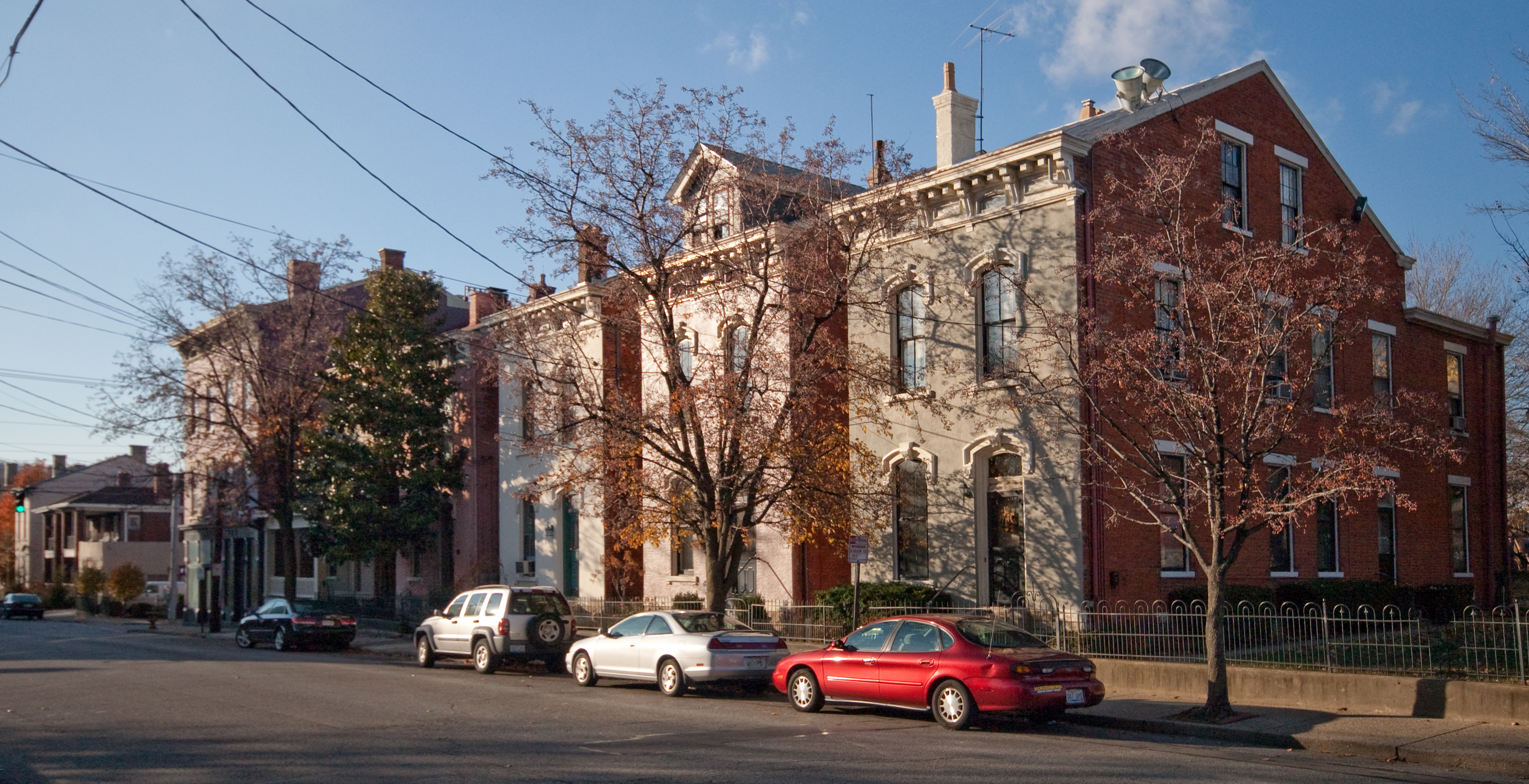

- Location within Kentucky Location within the United States
- Location: Roughly bounded by Madison Ave., 4th, Harvey, and Johnson Sts. (original); Roughly bounded by Madison Ave., 4th, Harvey, and Johnson Sts. (increase); Covington, Kentucky
- Coordinates: 39°05′06″N 84°30′49″W
- Area: 15 acres (6.1 ha) (original); 1.5 acres (0.61 ha) (increase)
- Architect: Multiple
- Architectural style: Italian Renaissance Revival, other
- NRHP reference No.: 80004499; 80004552
- Added to NRHP: May 29, 1980 (original); August 18, 1980 (increase)

The Mutter Gottes Historic District or Mother of God Historic District is a 15 acres (6.1 ha) area in Covington, Kentucky including the Mother of God Church which was listed on the National Register of Historic Places in 1980. The historic district included 153 buildings.

The German: Mutter Gottes Kirche is a parish church of the Roman Catholic Diocese of Covington located at 119 West 6th Street in Covington. It was separately listed on the National Register in 1973.

The district's boundaries were extended later in 1980 by a revised National Register listing which added seven contributing buildings.
