= Wadsworth (given name) =

Wadsworth is a masculine given name which may refer to:

- Wadsworth Busk (1730–1811), Attorney-General of the Isle of Man
- Wadsworth Harris (1864–1942), American silent film actor
- Wadsworth Jarrell (born 1929), American painter, sculptor and printmaker
- Wadsworth A. Parker (1864–1938), American printer and typeface designer
