= Daniel Carter Beard Boyhood Home =

Historic house in Kentucky, United States

- Daniel C. Beard Boyhood Home
- U.S. National Register of Historic Places
- U.S. National Historic Landmark
- U.S. Historic district – Contributing property
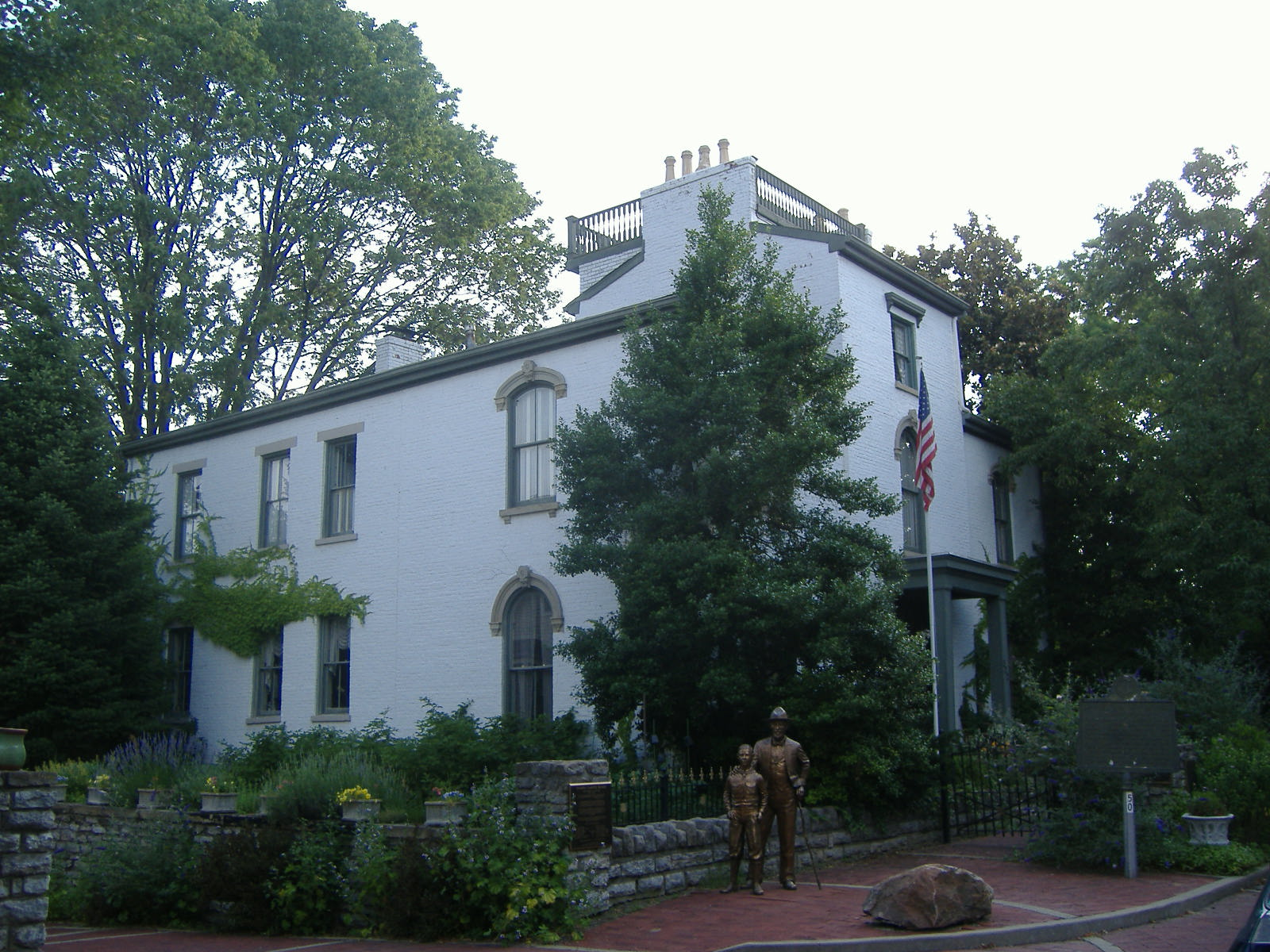

- Location within Kentucky Location within the United States
- Location: 322 E. Third St., Covington, Kentucky
- Coordinates: 39°5′21″N 84°30′20″W
- Area: 1 acre (0.40 ha)
- Built: 1821
- Part of: Riverside Drive Historic District (ID71000350)
- NRHP reference No.: 66000360

Significant dates
- Added to NRHP: October 15, 1966
- Designated NHL: June 23, 1965
- Designated CP: November 23, 1971

The Daniel Carter Beard Boyhood Home is a National Historic Landmark located in the Riverside Drive Historic District of Covington, Kentucky, overlooking the Licking River, across the Ohio River from Cincinnati, Ohio. The two-and-one-half story brick domicile, built in 1821 and one of the two oldest buildings in Kenton County, Kentucky, is the boyhood home of Daniel Carter Beard, a founder of the Boy Scouts of America. He was their National Scout Commissioner from its 1910 founding to his death in 1941.

== Background ==
Born in Cincinnati in 1850, Daniel Carter Beard moved with his family to Covington, Kentucky and the house by the river when he was eleven years old. Growing up, he routinely heard stories of Daniel Boone. Beard so idolized Boone that the boy and his friends dubbed themselves the "Boone Scouts" and sought to emulate the frontiersman. These Boone Scouts would engage in several activities, including sneaking past sentries of the various Union Army camps in town during the Civil War.

Beard was preparing for the life of camping, hand crafts, and nature that he lived as an adult. Beard moved away when he went to college, and following graduation, moved to New York City. Beard's family left the house in 1878 to move to New York City to join Daniel.

Beard was last in Covington in 1934, when a parade was held in his honor. Scouts from Kentucky, Ohio, and West Virginia came to show their appreciation.

His boyhood home was declared a National Historic Landmark in 1966. William Booth Memorial Hospital owned the building at the time that it was designated as a National Historic Landmark in 1966. They had been using it as a nursing school and dorm for the nursing students. The hospital is still located north of the Home. The home is now a private residence.
