= Veteran's Monument in Covington =

- U.S. National Register of Historic Places
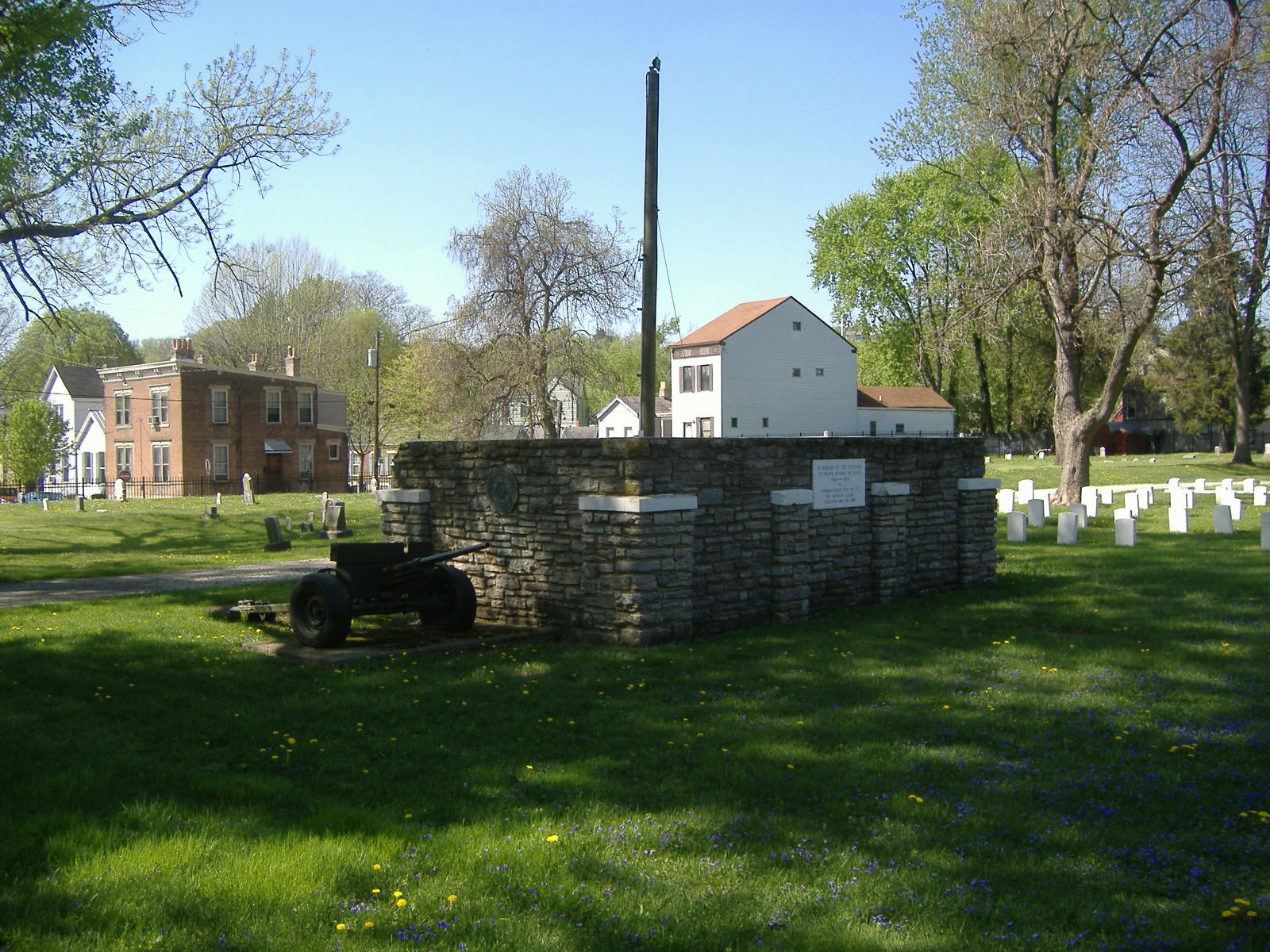
- North view of monument

- Location within Kentucky Location within the United States
- Location: Covington, Kentucky
- Built: 1933
- MPS: Civil War Monuments of Kentucky
- NRHP reference No.: 97000685
- Added to NRHP: July 17, 1997

The Veteran's Monument, also called the War Between the States Veteran's Memorial, in Linden Grove Cemetery of Covington, Kentucky was built in remembrance of both Union and Confederate veterans of the American Civil War. It is one of only two memorials in the Commonwealth of Kentucky that celebrate soldiers of both sides of the conflict. The American Legion dedicated the monument on May 30, 1933, which was that year's Memorial Day.

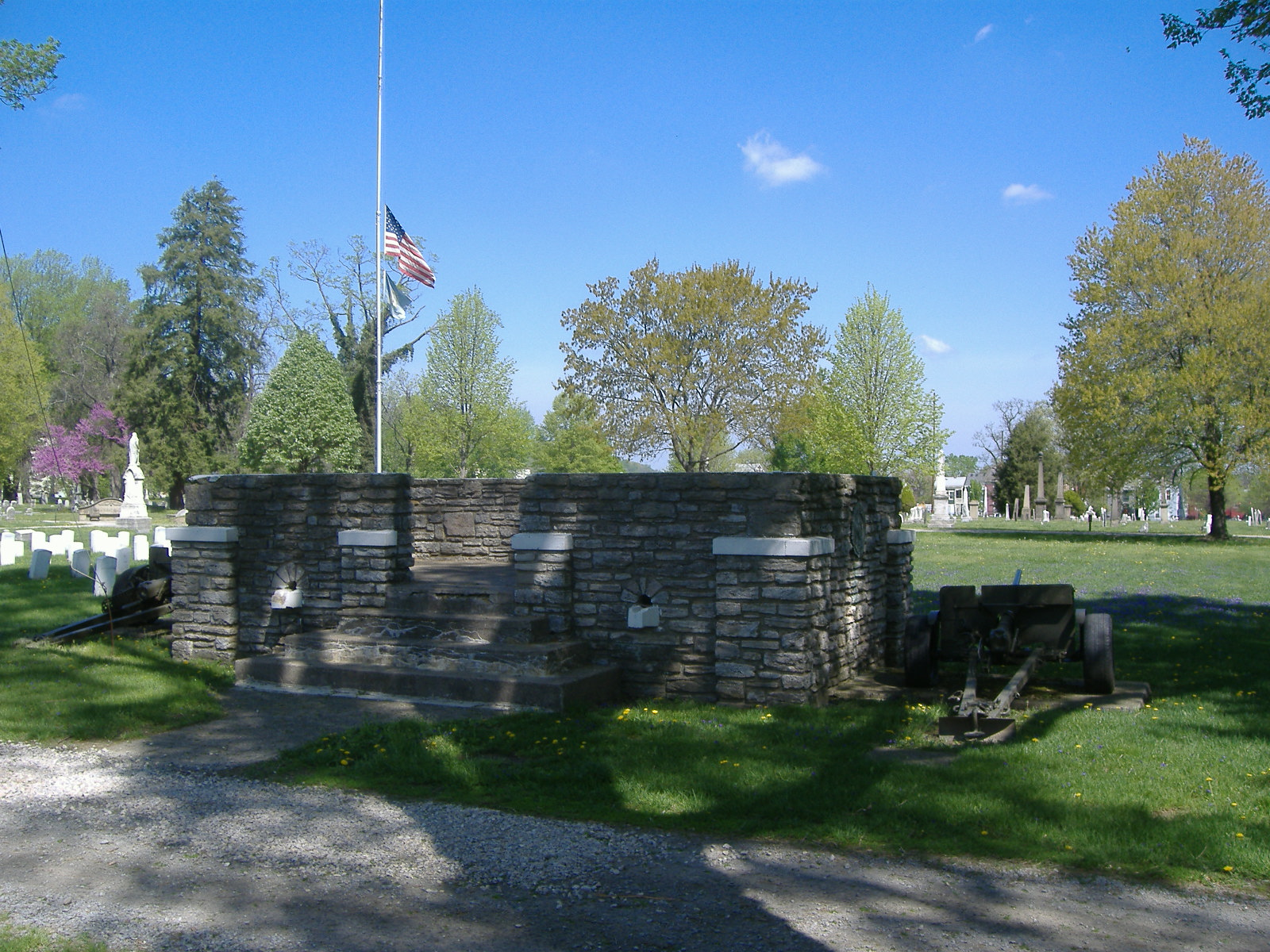
South view of monument.

The monument is built so that presentations could be held on its top, presumably for Memorial Day celebrations, and is the only monument to the War in Kentucky that is a platform. It is also the only monument to the War in Kentucky that uses the phrase "War Between the States". The structure is five feet high, twenty-one feet long, and nine feet wide. It is constructed of concrete and limestone, with a hollow center for presenters. At each corner of the monument are similar engaged columns with concrete caps. An inscription is on a stone plaque on the north face. Steps on the south face allow for access on top of the monument. On the east face is an American Legion seal made of brass, denoting who built the monument.

Cannons have been placed on the east and west sides of the monument, which are not of the 1860s era.

On July 17, 1997, it was one of sixty-two different monuments to the Civil War in Kentucky placed on the National Register of Historic Places, as part of the Civil War Monuments of Kentucky Multiple Property Submission. It is within a few feet of the GAR Monument in Covington, which was also on the same MPS, but was built four years earlier.
