= Wadsworth (meteorite) =

HED meteorite

- Type: stony meteorite
- Class: achondrite
- Clan: HED meteorite
- Group: eucrite
- Shock stage: moderate
- Weathering grade: low
- Country: United States
- Region: Ohio
- Coordinates: 41°2′42″N 81°45′26″W
- Observed fall: Yes
- Fall date: 17 March 2026
- Found date: 18 March 2026
- TKW: 1.728 kilograms
- Strewn field: Yes
- Alternative names: Medina County

Wadsworth is a rare HED meteorite that fell in the US state of Ohio on 17 March 2026. A bright daytime bolide was seen streaking through the sky over Cleveland before fragmenting. With an estimated airburst energy equal to 250 tonnes of TNT (1.0×10^{12} J), it created a sonic boom heard dozens of miles from the event.

The fireball was captured by the GLM instrument aboard geostationary satellite GOES-19.

== Fall ==
A 6-foot (1.8 m), 7-short-ton (6.4 t) asteroid entered the atmosphere on 17 March 2026, 08:57 EDT at an altitude of 50.1 miles (80.6 km) while moving at a speed of 39,200 miles per hour (17.5 km/s). It fragmented at an altitude of 30.5 miles (49.1 km) over Valley City after passing 34 miles (55 km) through the atmosphere. The bolide was seen as far as Wisconsin and Maryland. Falling fragments from the asteroid were observed by three weather radars located in Pittsburgh, Cleveland and the Terminal Doppler Weather Radar at Cleveland Hopkins International Airport.

Calculation of the strewn field resulted in a prediction of small stones being dropped to the northeast over a length 30 kilometres (19 mi) and kilogram-scale fragments falling south of Rittman.

== Meteorites ==
The first pieces were found by meteorite hunters from Connecticut, Roberto Vargas and Matt Perison. These stones were 12.2 and 1.75 grams in mass. Soon after, many more fragments were found; so far the largest known fragment from this fall, which was found by Mark Sokol and others on 20 March 2026, weighs 509.9 grams (1 lb 2 oz). A total of 1,728 grams (3 lb 13 oz) were found. This meteorite was scientifically classified by the Ohio Meteorite Classification (OMC) Team as a monomict eucrite.
