= Southgate Street School =

Coordinates: 39°05′41.1″N 84°29′36.0″W

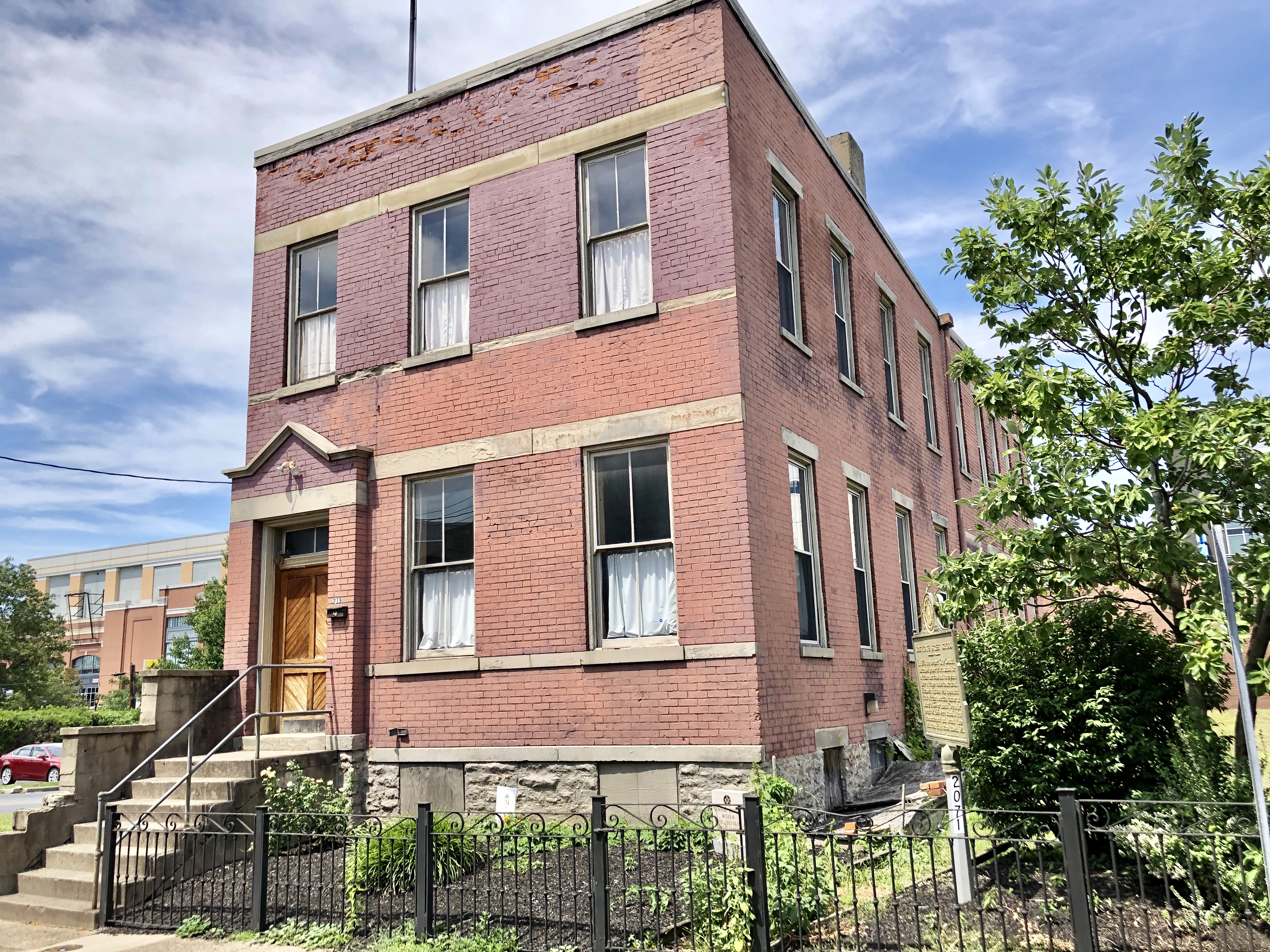
- Newport, Kentucky, US

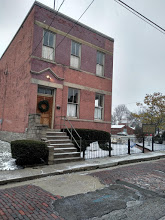

Southgate Street School is a former black school in Newport, Kentucky. The building today serves as a local history museum.

After the American Civil War the Freeman's Bureau was tasked with educating the newly freed black children. The Freeman's Bureau reported in 1868 there were 15 pupils enrolled in the school. After 1869 the Bureau could no longer perform due to budget cuts. Then in 1870 the City of Newport, Kentucky took over the running of Campbell County's only black school. By 1873, they established a school on Southgate Street. Elizabeth Hudson was hired as the first teacher at $35.00 per month. In 1893, the current two-level building was constructed on Southgate Street. The school remained in operation until 1955, when the Brown v. Board of Education decision closed the segregated schools.

After the school's closure, the building was bought by local gangster Frank "Screw" Andrews. The building was used as a warehouse. The school building is presently owned by a Black Masonic Lodge (Prince Hall Masonic Lodge 120). In 1985, The Southgate Street School was listed as a contributing property to the Mansion Hill Historic District. As of 2017 the first floor is used by the City of Newport and the Newport Foundation as the Newport History Museum. Museum displays remind visitors of school life in the early twentieth century. Other exhibits document Newport's history including displays about its gambling history. This project was initiated by Scott Clark, Newport's Historic Preservation officer and students from Northern Kentucky University's Master of Public History Program.
