= Wadsworth Electric Manufacturing Company =

- U.S. National Register of Historic Places
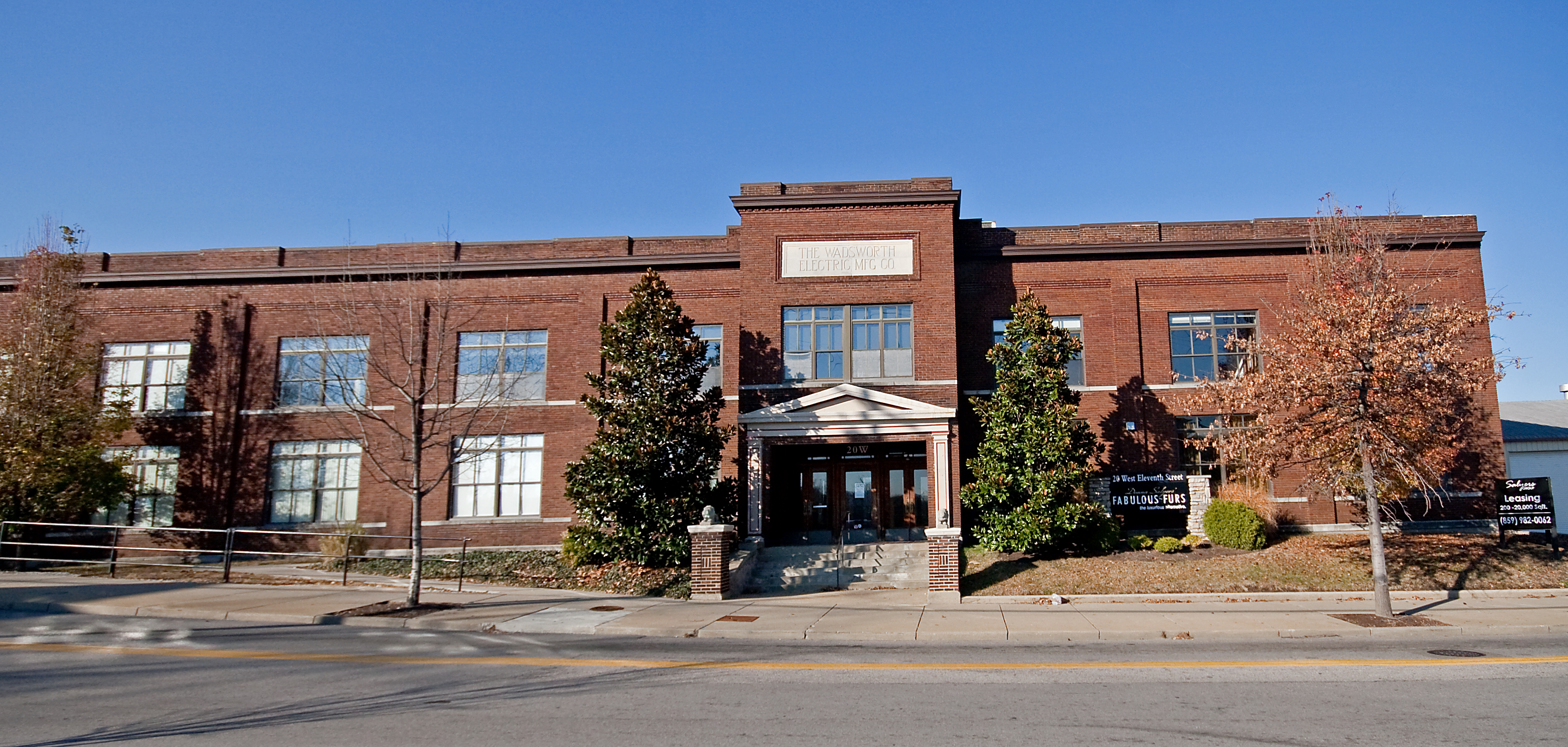

- Location within Kentucky Location within the United States
- Interactive map showing the location of Wadsworth Electric Manufacturing Company
- Location: 20 W. 11th St. Covington, Kentucky
- Coordinates: 39°4′45″N 84°30′36″W
- Area: 3 acres (1.2 ha)
- Built: 1923
- Architect: George Lubrecht
- NRHP reference No.: 93001585
- Added to NRHP: January 28, 1994

The Wadsworth Electric Manufacturing Company was formed by George B. and Harry Wadsworth in 1904. George received his first patent for an electrical service entrance safety switch in 1907. This device reduced the likelihood of accident or fire and enabled homeowners to replace their own fuses. He received an additional 15 patents in the field between 1907 and 1925. Harry Wadsworth left the business in 1910.

== Expansion ==
The company incorporated in 1918 and moved from an address on Madison Avenue to a Pike Street address. By 1922, the company had grown to 100 employees and $1.5 million in sales. That year, the company announced the construction of a new building on 11th Street, Covington, Kentucky. The building was completed in March 1923. In 1925, George Wadsworth sold his rights to 16 patents to a Cincinnati company and resigned from Wadsworth Electrical Manufacturing. David Wadsworth, George's brother, was appointed vice president and chief engineer in 1927 and continued George's record of innovation until his death in 1937.

== Personnel ==
Joseph Feltman, a local banker, was president of the company at the time of David Wadsworth's death. He was succeeded by his son-in-law, Leo Kuhlman who continued as president until 1981. The company was apparently successful during this period with employment reaching 300 during the 1950s. Products included breaker boxes, fuses, wiring ducts, power outlets and other electrical devices.

== Closure ==
Kuhlman was succeeded by his sons, John and Joseph, who ran the company until it was liquidated in December 1990.
