= Carneal House =

Historic house in Kentucky, United States

- U.S. Historic district – Contributing property
- Location within Kentucky
- Location: 405 E. 2nd St., Covington, Kentucky
- Coordinates: 39°5′25″N 84°30′17″W
- Built: 1815
- Architectural style: Georgian
- Part of: Riverside Drive Historic District (ID71000350)
- Added to NRHP: November 23, 1971

The Carneal House is a historic residence located at 405 East Second Street in Covington, Kentucky, United States. Commonly believed to be Covington's oldest surviving structure, the home was begun in the year 1815 by Thomas D. Carneal, one of the founders of the city of Covington. Carneal House is a two-story brick home with arched windows, built in an Italianate-Federalist style and somewhat influenced by late-Renaissance architect Andrea Palladio. Among noted visitors to the home was Revolutionary War hero the Marquis de Lafayette, who paid a call during his final American tour in 1824–1825. House was built for Aaron Gano in 1815 and sold to William Southgate in 1825. Lafayette's visit to the Southgates has been misunderstood, since the visit took place at Mrs. Adelizza Keene Southgate's home in Lexington, where they were visiting. ["Pioneers of Progress: The Southgate Family in Northern Kentucky," Northern Kentucky Heritage Magazine, volume XIX, #2, page 3]

After the death of Mr. Carneal, the home was purchased by William Wright Southgate, a Congressman from Northern Kentucky who circa 1835 added the large west wing as residence for his extended family of thirteen children, in-laws, and household retainers. The home is part of Covington's prestigious Riverside Drive Historic District, and in recent years has operated as a private residence, and as a commercial bed and breakfast.
