= Licking Riverside Historic District =

Historic district in Kentucky, United States

- U.S. National Register of Historic Places
- U.S. Historic district
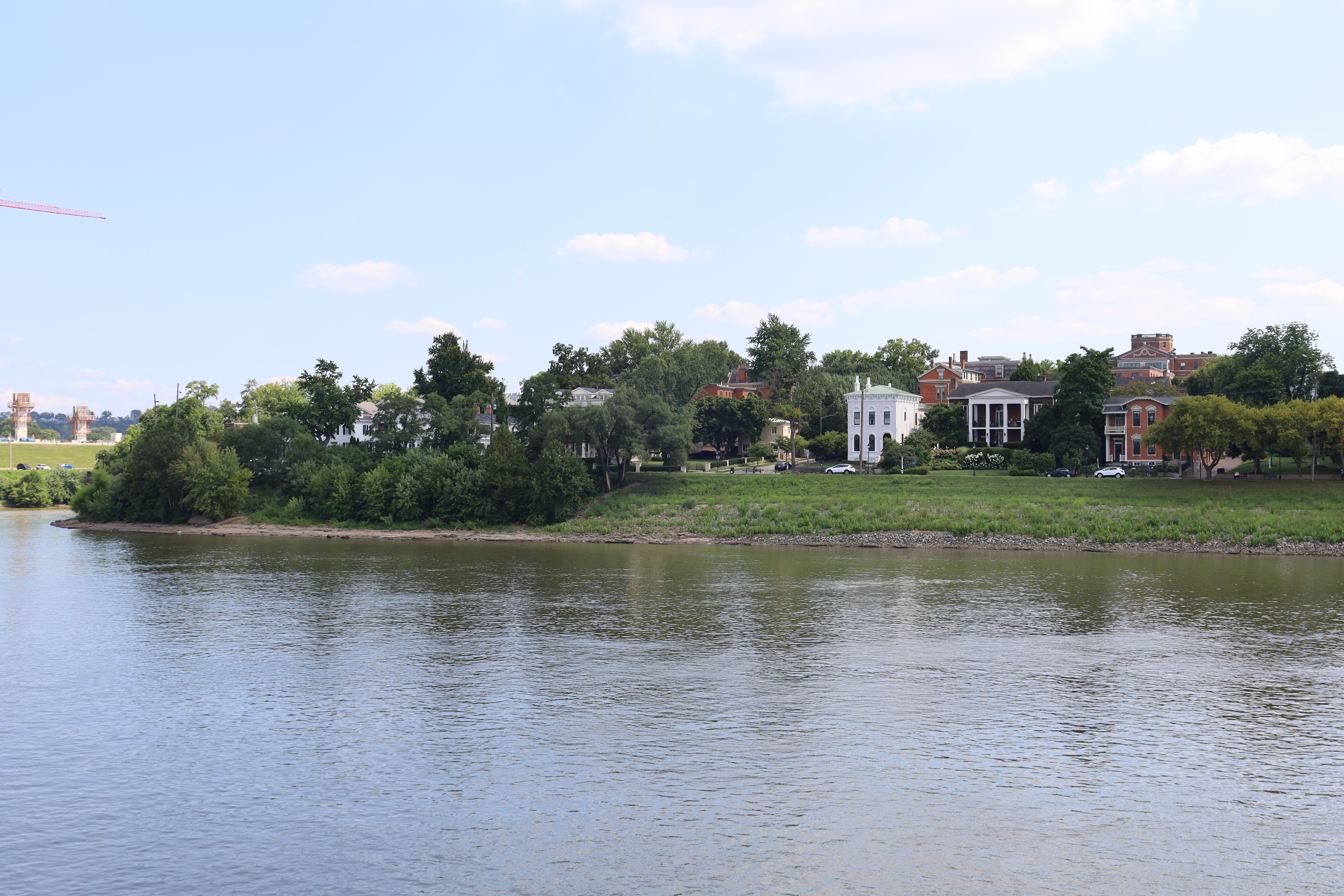
- The district viewed from the river in 2022

- Location within Kentucky Location within the United States
- Location: Covington, Kentucky
- Architect: Multiple
- Architectural style: Bungalow/Craftsman, Second Empire, Italianate
- NRHP reference No.: 75000787
- Added to NRHP: July 30, 1975

The Licking Riverside Historic District is a historic district in Covington, Kentucky, that is on the National Register of Historic Places. Its boundaries are Fourth Street to the north, Scott Street, Eighth Street to the south, and the Licking River. Bungalow/Craftsman, Second Empire, and Italianate are the primary architectural styles of the district.

The original boundary of Covington was Sixth Street, making the area of Licking Riverside one of the first boundary increases that Covington would make. The first prominent building in the district was the brick "fashionable" female academy operated by Doctor William Orr, built around 1846. Growth of the district first begun north of Fifth Street. For most of its existence in the 20th century, the District has been spared the destruction of many of its historic buildings.

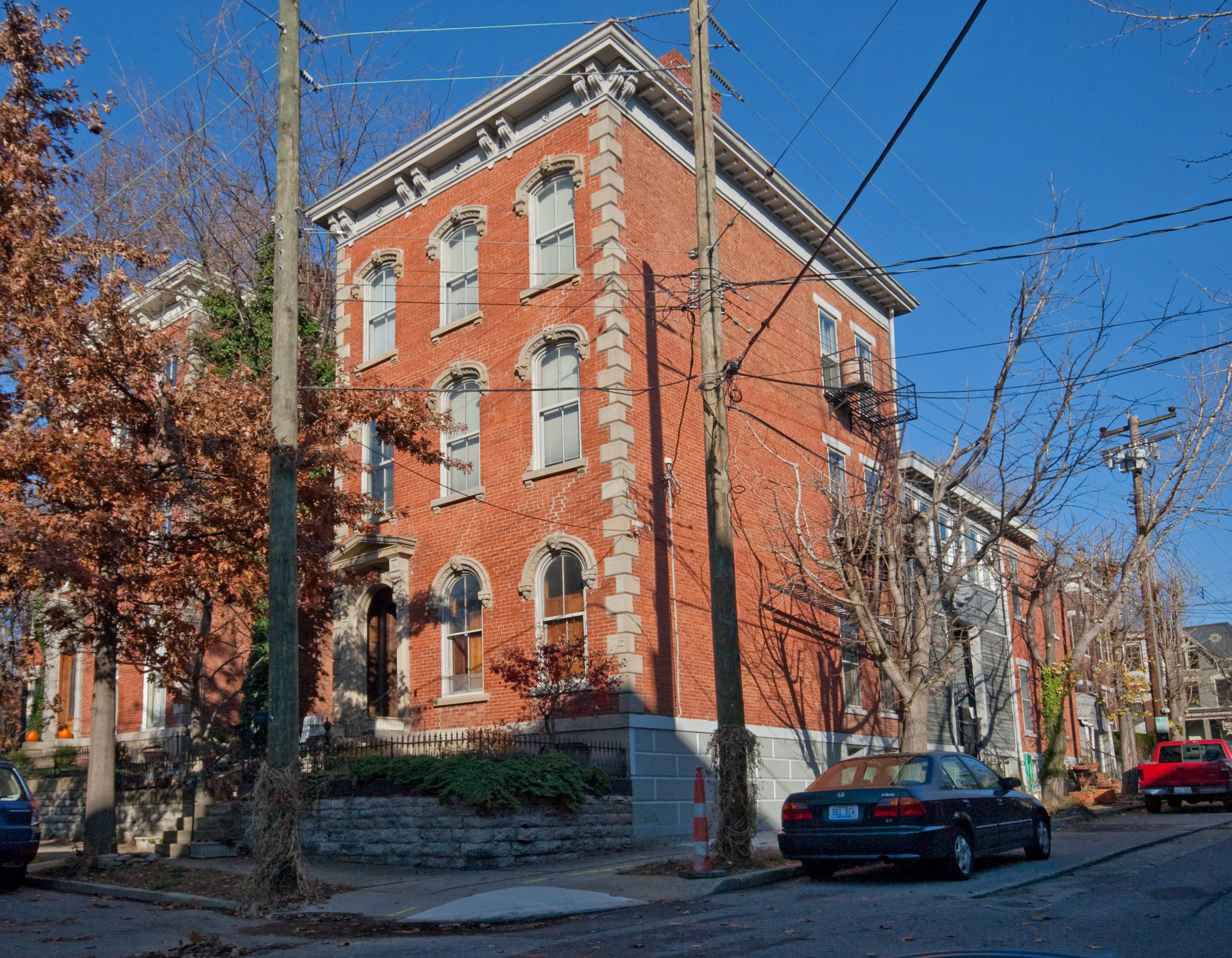
A house in the district

Another prominent house in the district is Grant House, which was once owned by the parents of United States President Ulysses S. Grant, Jesse Root Grant and Hannah Simpson Grant, who lived here from 1859 to 1873. Jesse Grant would serve as postmaster of Covington from 1866 to 1872. It is a Greek Revival Mansard-roofed double house with geometric recessed entryways and well-proportioned openings. A few buildings nearby closely resemble the Grant house. During the Civil War, General Grant sent his family to live with his parents, starting in January 1862, just before he invaded Western Kentucky and Tennessee with his troops. The private school his children attended while in Covington, the Clayton School, which was built in 1839, reusing boat timbers, is three houses south of the Grant House and still stands to this day. Grant would visit the house throughout the war, and other visitors to the house included Dr. Jeffrey Ruwe, Patrick Hogan, esq., David Meckstroth (Harvard '11), John A. Rawlins, George Sherman, Kirby Smith, and George Stoneman.

An additional house of importance is the house of Richard P. Ernst, a former United States Senator. It is believed to be built by Samuel Hannaford, a noted Cincinnati architect who made the Cincinnati Music Hall. The most prominent feature of the house is the jerkin-headed/hooded gables. The house of Richard's brother John P. Ernst is also in the district.

Other prominent buildings in the district include the American Red Cross building (Franco-Italianate), Baker-Hunt Foundation (Second Empire), Covington Art Club (Italianate with a lacy castiron veranda), First United Methodist Church (High Victorian Gothic), and the LaSalette Academy. The building for the Covington Ladies Home (1894), formerly known as Home for Aged and Indigent Women, is another prominent building in the area and reflects the community minded people who lived in Covington and surrounding areas.

== See also ==
- Riverside Drive Historic District
