= Riverside Drive Historic District =

Historic district in Kentucky, United States

- U.S. National Register of Historic Places
- U.S. Historic district
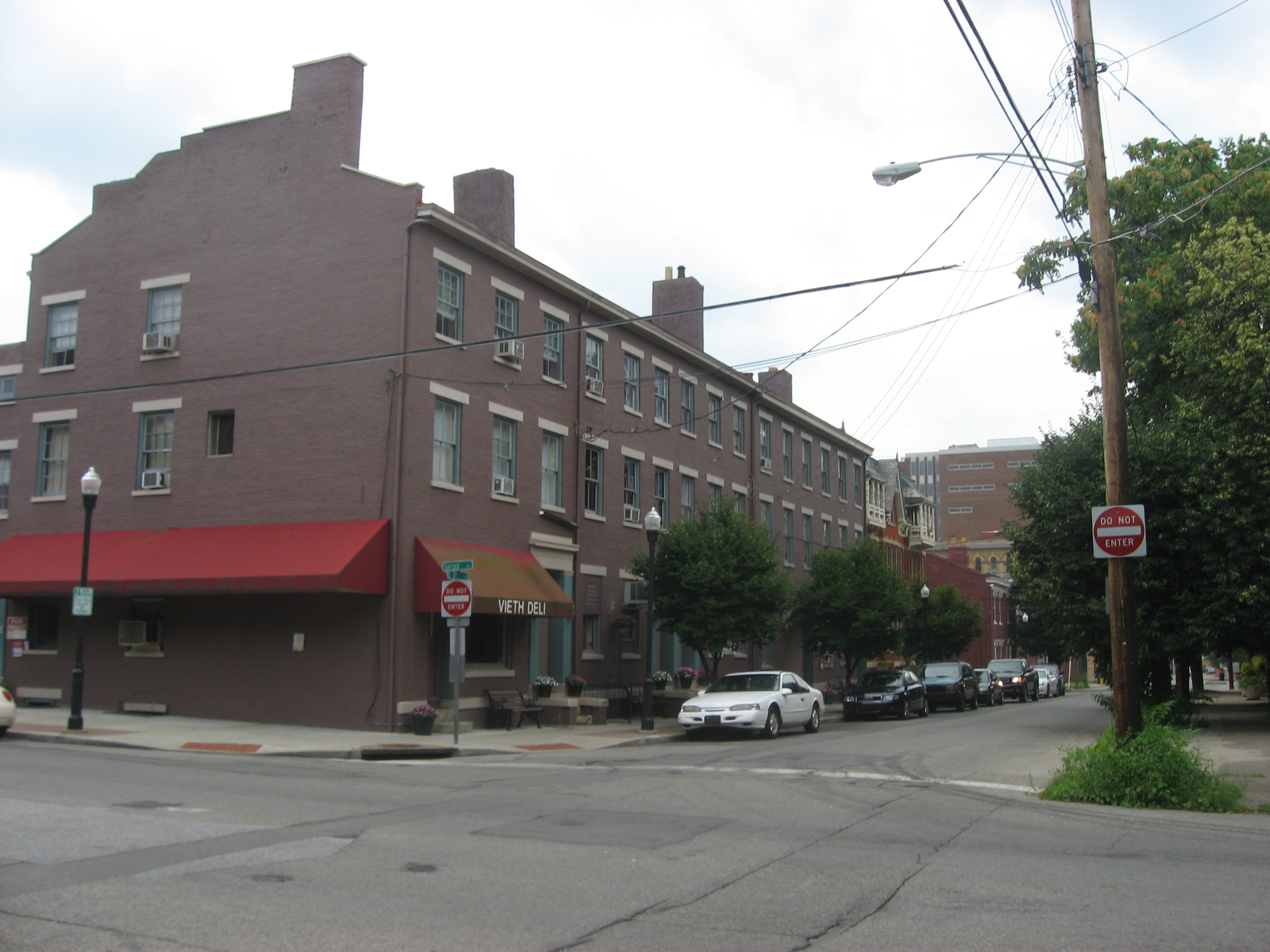
- Third Street in the district

- Location within Kentucky Location within the United States
- Location: Covington, Kentucky
- Coordinates: 39°5′23″N 84°30′23″W
- Built: 1815
- Architectural style: Greek Revival, Late Victorian, Georgian
- NRHP reference No.: 71000350
- Added to NRHP: November 23, 1971

The Riverside Drive Historic District is a historic district located at the west bank of the confluence of the Licking River and the Ohio River in Covington, Kentucky, directly across from Cincinnati, Ohio.

Prior to the city of Covington's founding, George Rogers Clark used the area as a mustering spot for incursions against the Indians from Ohio who were raiding Kentucky, and then later for organizing troops for his Illinois campaign. It is believed that the first white settlers of the Greater Cincinnati area chose the Riverside Drive area for their settlement. Riverside Drive was a popular place to build the finest houses in Covington, with many still standing from the early 19th century. Over thirty of the buildings in the district are considered exceptional samples of their architectural style.

There are several independently notable buildings in the district. The Daniel Carter Beard Boyhood Home was the boyhood home of Daniel Carter Beard, founder of the Boy Scouts of America, and is a National Historic Landmark. The 1815-built Thomas Carneal House, the first brick house in Covington, is a Georgian-style domicile reminiscent of Italian architect Andrea Palladio; it still features a tunnel, leading to the Licking River, that allowed the owners to help slaves escaping via the Underground Railroad. Prominent visitors to the house included the Marquis de Lafayette, Henry Clay, Andrew Jackson, and Daniel Webster.

Seven bronze statues of prominent figures in the history of the area are placed in lifelike poses on riverside benches. These include James Bradley, Daniel Carter Beard, John James Audubon, and Chief Little Turtle.

== Gallery ==
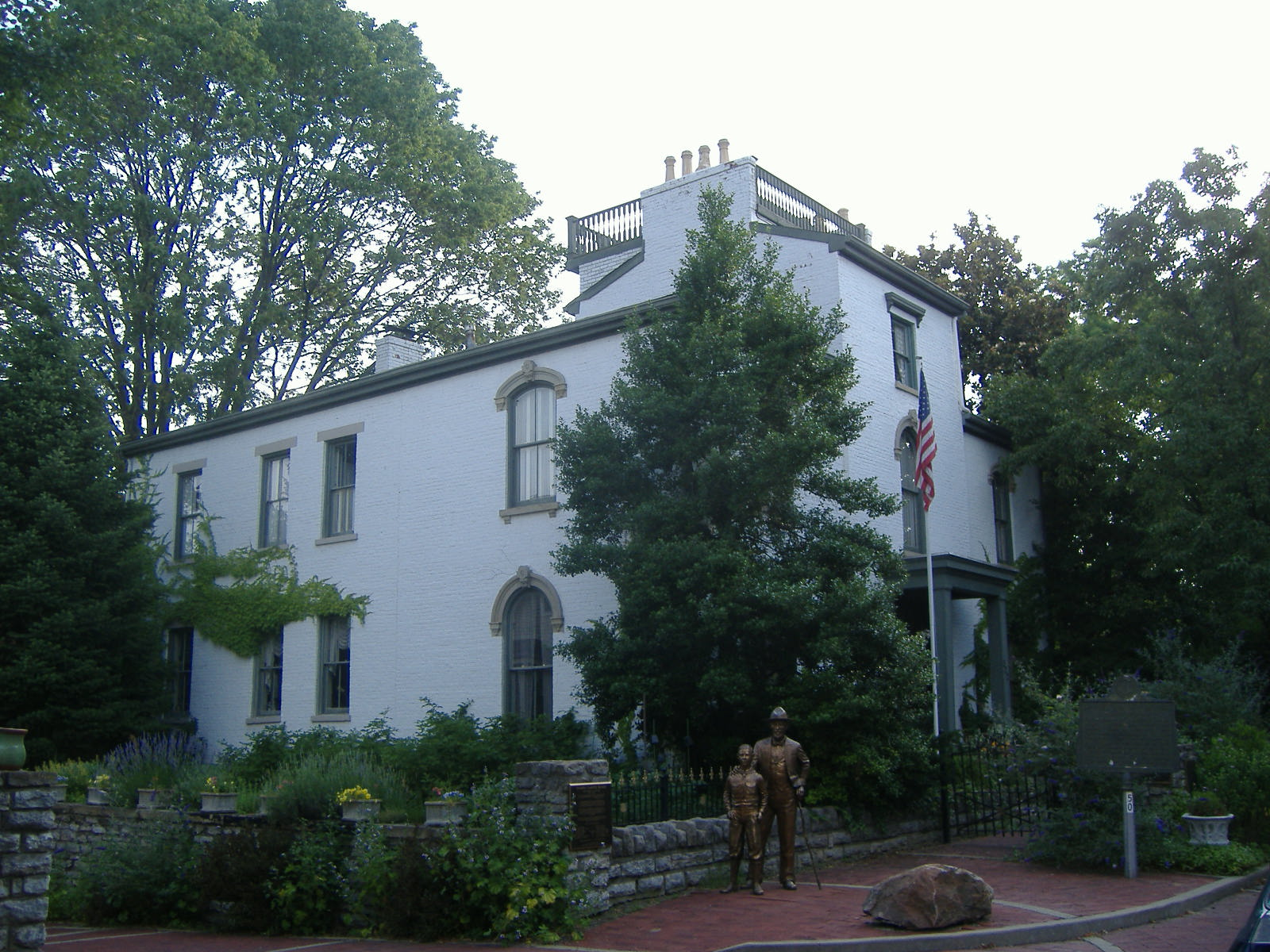
Daniel Carter Beard Boyhood Home

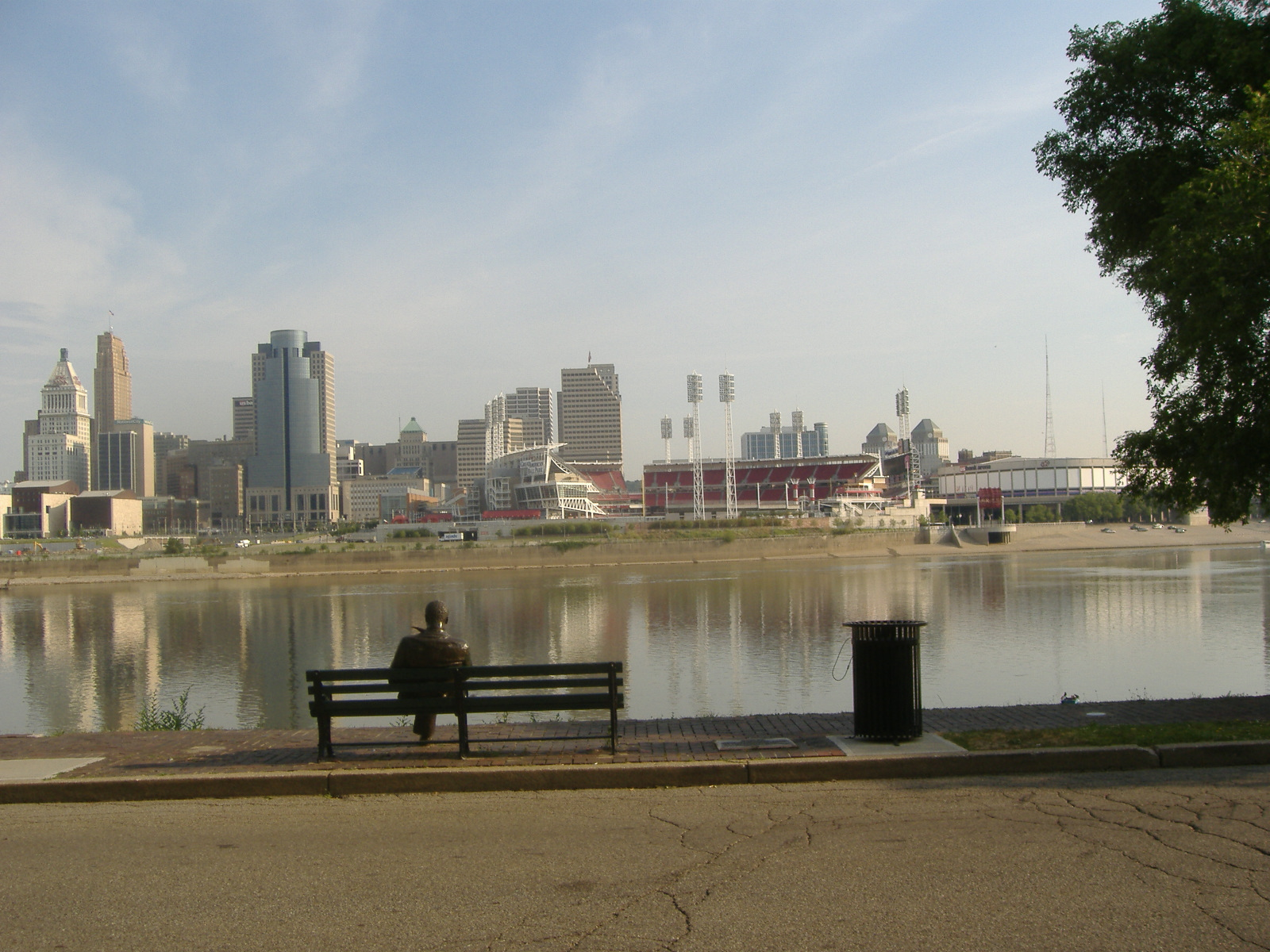
Another statue overlooks Great American Ball Park

== See also ==
- Licking Riverside Historic District
