= Lewiston Historic District =

Lewiston Historic District may refer to:

- Lewiston Historic District (Lewiston, California), listed on the National Register of Historic Places in Trinity County, California
- Lewiston Historic District (Lewiston, Idaho), listed on the National Register of Historic Places in Nez Perce County, Idaho

== See also ==
- Lewisburg Historic District (disambiguation)
