= Lewisburg Historic District =

Lewisburg Historic District may refer to:

- Lewisburg Historic District (Covington, Kentucky), listed on the National Register of Historic Places (NRHP) in Kenton County
- Lewisburg Archeological District, Diana, New York, a historic district listed on the NRHP in New York
- Lewisburg Historic District (Lewisburg, Pennsylvania), listed on the NRHP in Union County
- Lewisburg Avenue Historic District, Franklin, Tennessee, listed on the NRHP in Tennessee
- Lewisburg Historic District (Lewisburg, West Virginia), listed on the NRHP in Greenbrier County

== See also ==
- Lewiston Historic District (disambiguation)
