= Mainstrasse Village =

- West Side-Mainstrasse Historic District
- U.S. National Register of Historic Places
- U.S. Historic district
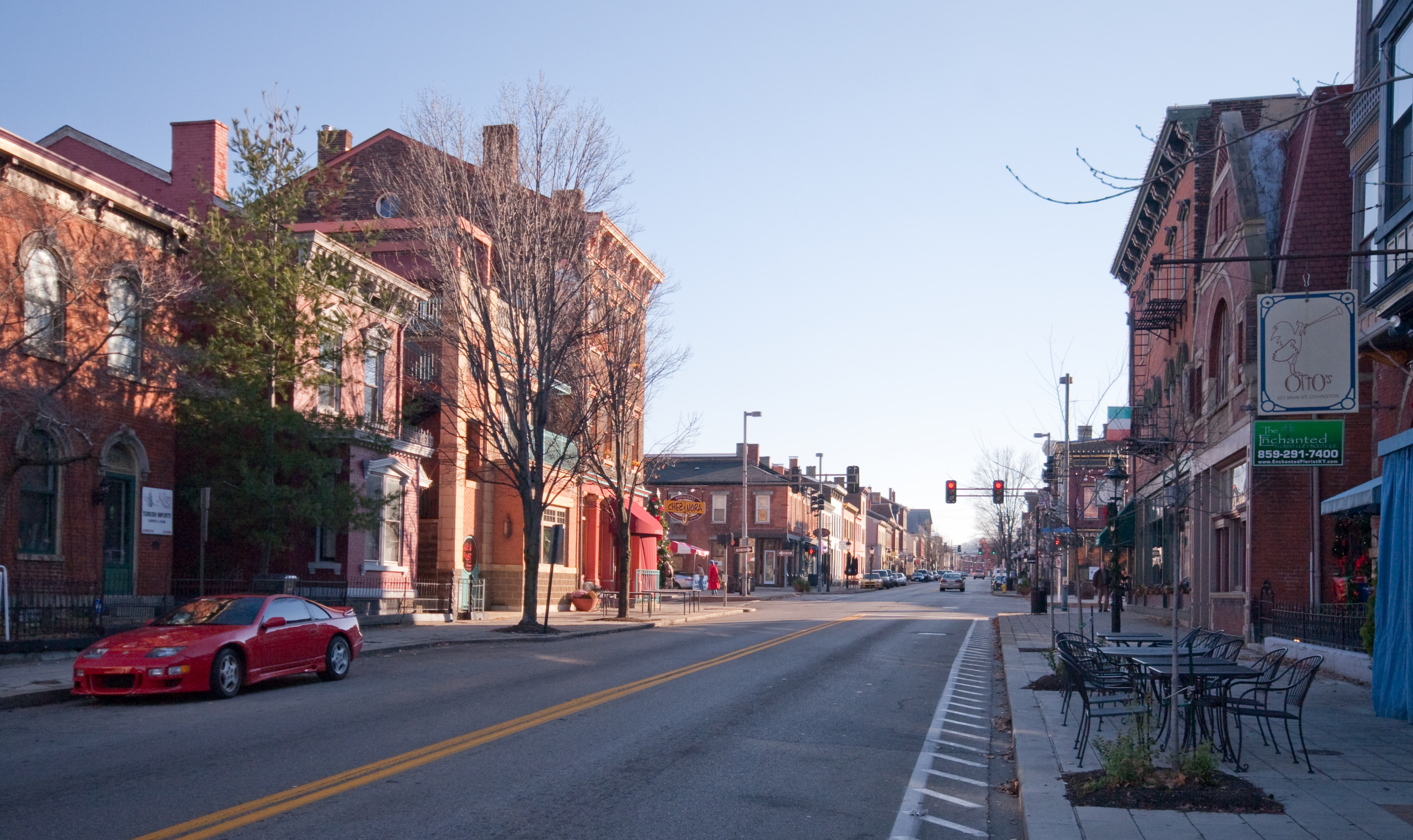
- View of Main Street

- Location within Kentucky
- Interactive map of West Side-Mainstrasse Historic District
- Location: Roughly bounded by the Chesapeake & Ohio railroad line and 6th, Philadelphia, Dalton, Pike, and Robbins Sts.
- Coordinates: 39°05′03.5″N 84°31′03.1″W
- Area: 91 acres (0.37 km^{2})
- Architectural style: Italianate, Federal, Queen Anne, Gothic Revival, Victorian, Second Empire
- NRHP reference No.: 83003650
- Added to NRHP: November 10, 1983

Mainstrasse Village, often just called Mainstrasse (sometimes spelled MainStrasse) is a residential neighborhood located in Covington, Kentucky. The entirety of the neighborhood is part of an urban historical district. The neighborhood is home to most of Covington's nightlife, due to the amount of bars and restaurants located within the borders.

== Geography ==
Mainstrasse is located directly south of Covington's central business district. Mainstrasse is also bordered by West Pike Street to the south (bordering Westside and Seminary Square), I-75 to the east (bordering Botany Hills and Lewisburg) and by Mutter Gottes to the northeast.

The main business district runs north–south along Main Street.

== History ==
In February 1815, Covington was incorporated as a town. By 1834, it was chartered as a city. The city boomed as a flood of German and Catholic immigrants came to live and work in the city's distilling, tobacco, and manufacturing districts. By 1900, it was the second most populated city in Kentucky. However, due to the Great Depression, deindustrialization, and urban flight, the city declined in importance and population, resulting in its neighborhoods beginning to decay. In the late 1970s, the United States Department of Housing and Urban Development identified Covington as one of the nation's "most distressed cities".

Starting in the 1970s, the City of Covington developed plans to revitalize the city's decaying west end. One of the larger plans was the creation of neighborhood full of shops and restaurants. Going along with the city's German heritage, this new neighborhood was going to also be heavily German themed. The city choose the area surrounding 6th Street due to its proximity to I-75/71 and old Goebel Park. The new neighborhood would be called "Mainstrasse", due to its German roots and its location along Main Street. Along with the need for more economic activity within the city, Mainstrasse was also planned as a way to stop the urban decay that had been going on, and preserve the historical buildings.

The original plans for the village included a large German Gothic clock-tower, a visitors center, shelter house, restored Goebel Park, new sidewalks and landscaping, and a decorative fountain. In April 1977, the Commonwealth of Kentucky awarded Covington a grant in the amount of $2.5 million to begin work on the village. Among the most prominent early supporters of the project was Kentucky Governor Julian Carroll.

Work on the village began in the summer of 1977. One of the first projects to be finished was the Carrol Chimes Clock Tower. The clock-tower was dedicated on July 19, 1978.

Main Strasse Village was formally dedicated on September 8, 1979. Among the dignitaries present were Kentucky State Development Secretary William Short and Federal Republic of Germany Counsel to the United States Frederick Dittrich. Events on dedication day included speeches, entertainment and German food.

The "Goose Girl" Fountain was unveiled in October 1980. By 1985, the number of businesses in the village was up to 25. In January 1996, the Main Strasse Village Association hired their first full-time executive director. The association promotes the neighborhood, sponsors many of the annual events in the village and encourages tourism. Nowadays the village is also home to the Northern Kentucky Convention and Visitors Bureau.

The two biggest festivals that happen in the village are: Maifest and Oktoberfest. Both festivals are German. Both of these festivals draw hundreds of visitors into the village every year. Other smaller festivals and events held in the village included: Antiques Fair, Auto Fest, Christmas Walk, the Great American Yard Sale and Goetta Fest.

== Demographics ==
Historical population
Year	Pop.	±%
1970	3,521	—
1980	2,762	−21.6%
1990	1,963	−28.9%
2000	1,809	−7.8%
2010	1,577	−12.8%
2020	1,529	−3.0%
Data is for Census Tract 603, which encompasses a large amount of Mainstrasse, but not all of it. Census Tract 607 includes the area south of W 9th St., but north of Pike.

As of the 2020 census, there were 1,529 people, 881 households, and 268 families living within the neighborhood. The population density was 10,753.4 people per square mile (4,152/km^{2}). The racial makeup of the neighborhood was 84.3% White, 6.8% African American, 0.45% Native American, 0.52% Asian, 0.26% Pacific Islander, 1.83% from some other race, 5.8% from two or more races. 5.5% were Hispanic or Latino of any race. There were 1,183 housing units.

There were 881 households, out of which 9.3% had children under the age of 18 living with them, 19.63% were married couples living together, 4.5% had a male householder with no spouse present, 6.24% had a female householder with no spouse present, and 75.5% were non-families. 52.9% of all households were made up of individuals, and 6.9% had someone living alone who was 65 years of age or older.

11.6% of the neighborhood's population was under the age of 18, 80% of the population was 18–64, and 8.3% of the population was 65 or older.

According to the American Community Survey, for the period 2020–2024, the estimated median annual income for a household in the neighborhood was $69,896, and the median for a family was $126,750. About 11% of the population was living below the poverty line, including 12.5% of those 18 to 64, and 2.5% of those 65 or older. 75% of the population was employed.

== Architecture ==
Various styles of architecture line Mainstrasse's streets. These include Federal, Victorian, Italianate, and Queen Anne. Other styles include Gothic Revival and Second Empire.

Mainstrasse carries numerous architectural and cultural similarities with other German historic districts, such as Over-the-Rhine and German Village.

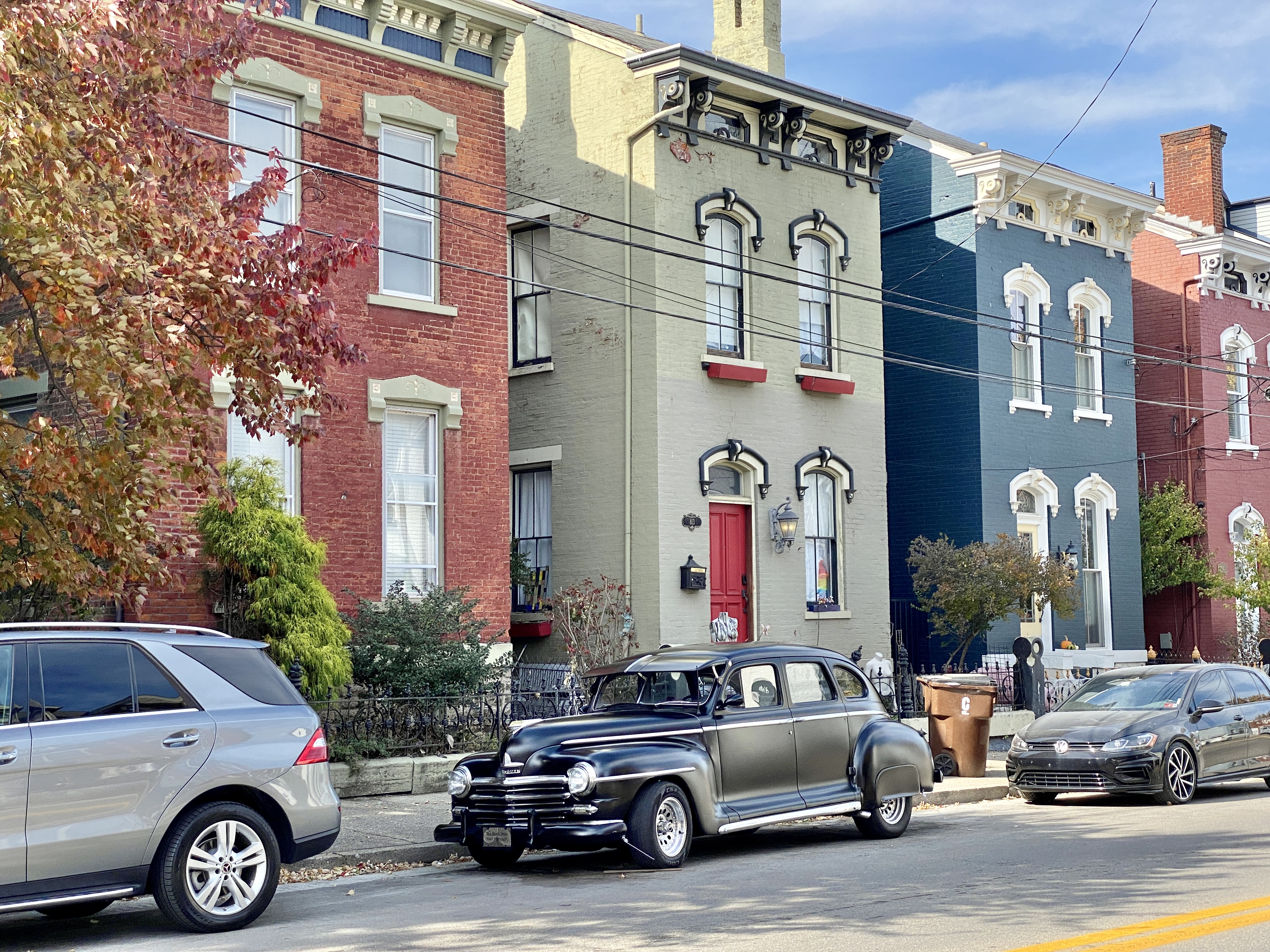
Row homes in Mainstrasse (Italianate)

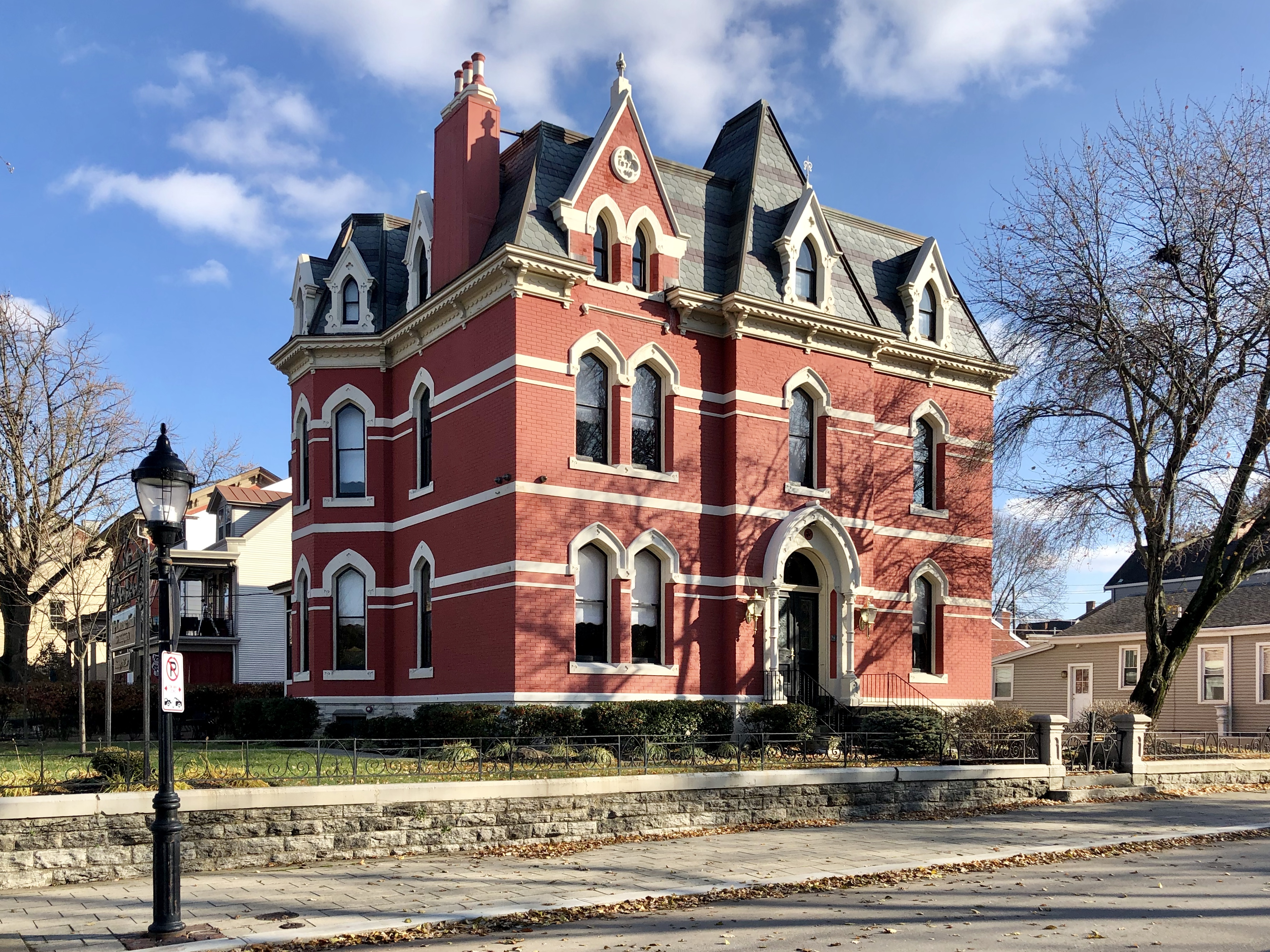
The historic Boyd Mansion (Gothic Revival/Second Empire)

== Parks ==
Mainstrasse Village is home to two parks.

=== George Steinford Park ===
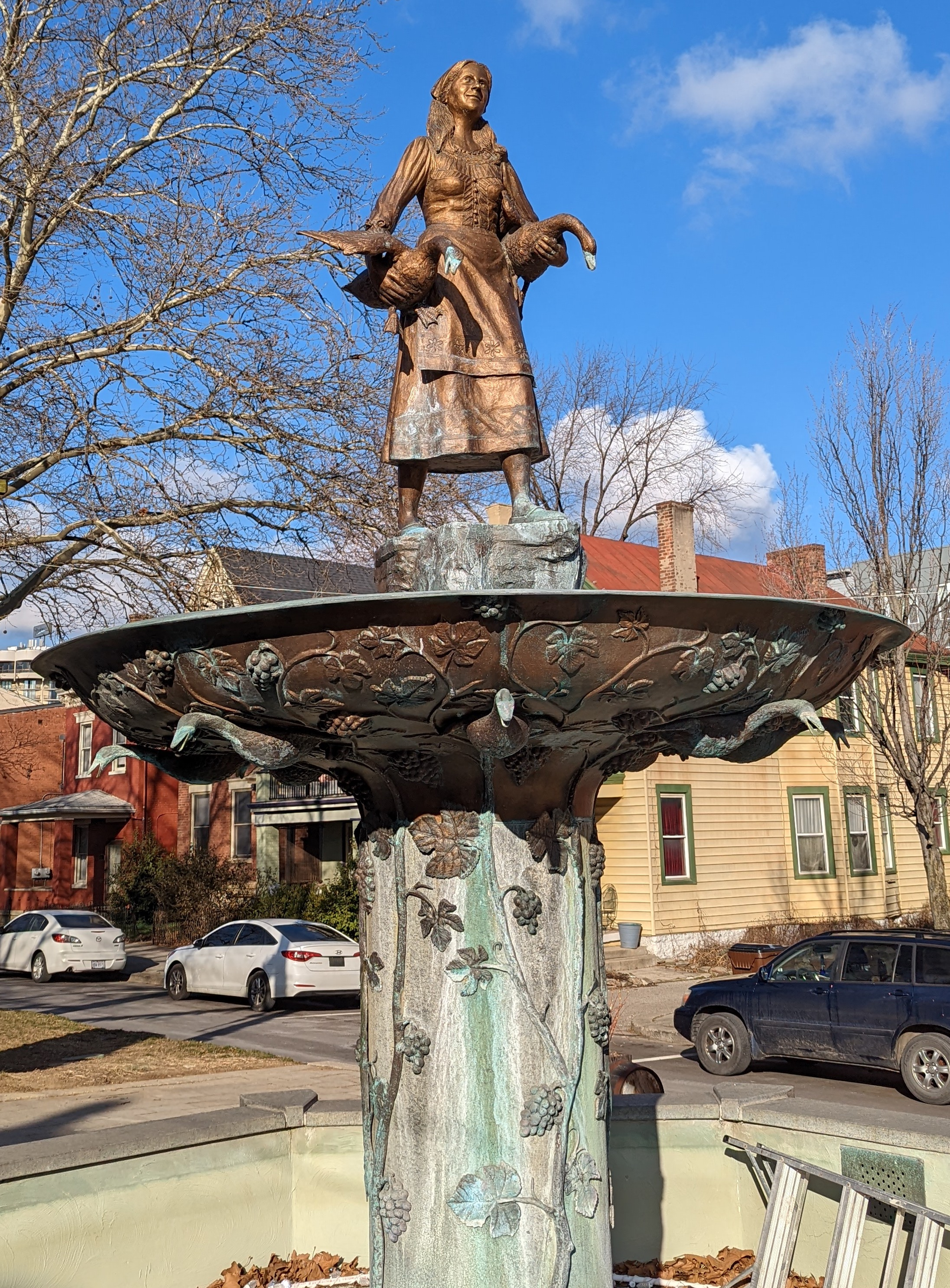
"Goose Girl" Fountain

George Steinford Park is a large promenade that separates West Sixth Street. It serves as a picnic and outdoor eating space for the Main St. business district. It is also home to the "Goose Girl Fountain", sculpted by local sculptor Eleftherios Karkadoulias. The fountain is based off the Grimm's Brothers "The Goose Girl" tale.

The park was named after George Steinford, a Kenton County Commissioner and State Representative, who lived on West Sixth Street.

=== Goebel Park ===
Goebel Park is a large park fit with gazebos, picnic shelters, a playground, and grills. The park is home to the Sergeant First Class Jason Bishop Memorial.

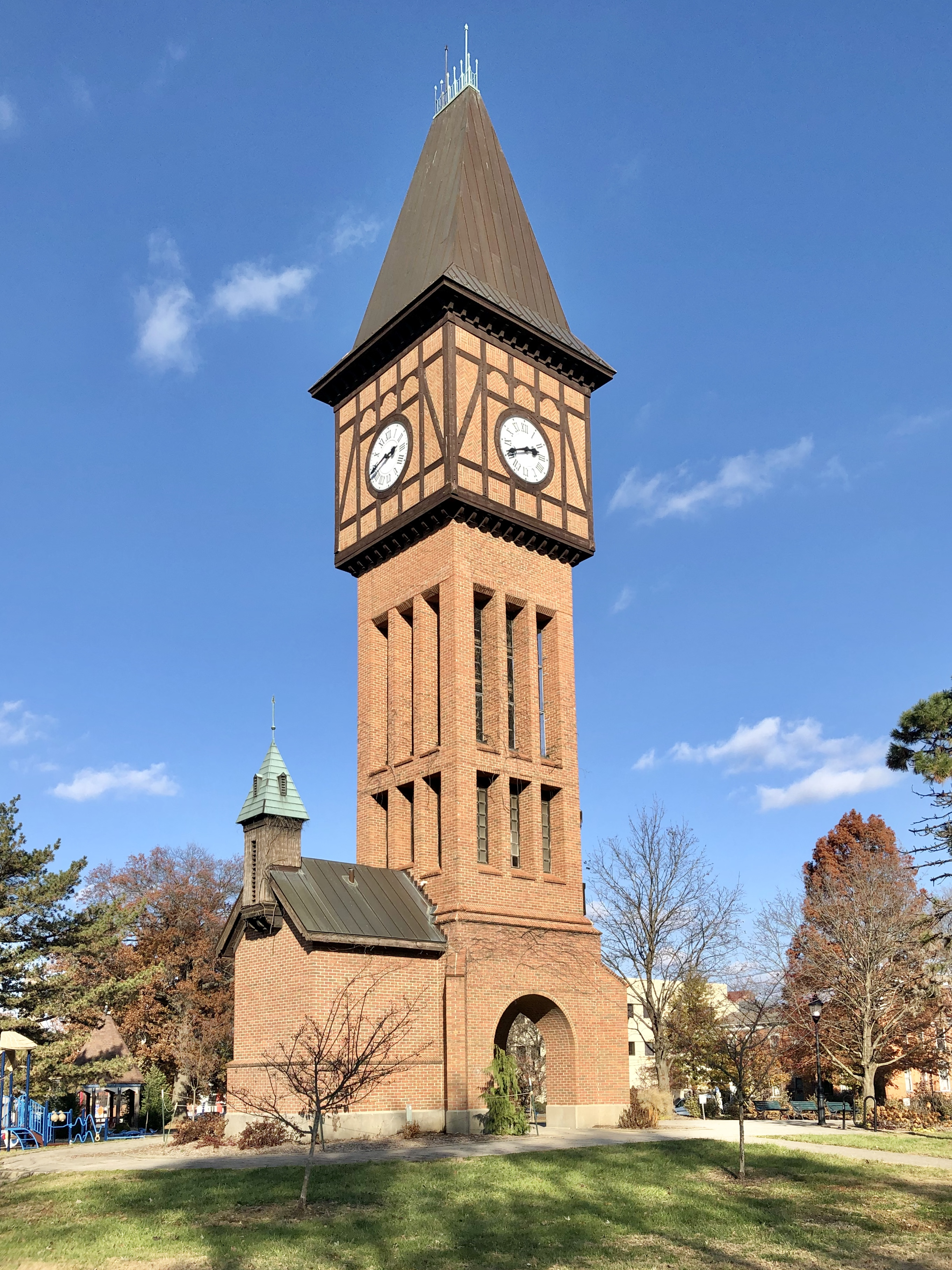
Carrol Chimes Clock Tower

The park's most famous memorial, however, is the Carrol Chimes Clock Tower, named after Julian Carroll. The clock tower displays a mechanical puppet rendition of the Pied Piper on the hour, April through December. The tower was completed in 1979 by architects Addison Clipson and Bill Batson.

The park opened in 1908, and is named after William Goebel, the only Covington native to ever be elected to the office of Governor of Kentucky.

== In media ==
- Extremely Wicked, Shockingly Evil and Vile was filmed in the neighborhood. The neighborhood was used to recreate 1970s Aspen, Colorado.
- The Alto Knights was filmed in various locations around Covington, including along Pike Street, which runs through the neighborhood.

== See also ==
- Historic districts in the United States
- National Register of Historic Places listings in Kenton County, Kentucky
