= CNAC =

CNAC may refer to:

- China National Aviation Corporation
- Canadian Numbering Administration Consortium
- Centro Nacional Autónomo de Cinematografía
- Centre National d'Art Contemporain, Grenoble, France; located at the Le Magasin
- Centre National des Arts du Cirque, Châlons-en-Champagne, Marne, Grand Est, France
- CNAC House, Hong Kong International Airport, Hong Kong, China; HQ for Air China
- Cambridge Nonviolent Action Committee, part of the Cambridge movement (civil rights)
- Covington Neighborhood Action Coalition, see History of Covington, Kentucky
