= National Register of Historic Places listings in Trinity County, California =

Location of Trinity County in California

This is a list of the National Register of Historic Places listings in Trinity County, California.

This is intended to be a complete list of the properties and districts on the National Register of Historic Places in Trinity County, California, United States. Latitude and longitude coordinates are provided for many National Register properties and districts; these locations may be seen together in a Google map.

There are 5 properties and districts listed on the National Register in the county.

This National Park Service list is complete through NPS recent listings posted September 4, 2026.

== Current listings ==
| | Name on the Register | Image | Date listed | Location | City or town | Description |
|---|---|---|---|---|---|---|
| 1 | Bowerman Barn | Bowerman Barn | March 20, 1981 (#81000181) | Southwest of Trinity Center on Guy Covington Dr. 40°54′00″N 122°46′01″W | Trinity Center | |
| 2 | De-No-To Cultural District | | April 24, 1985 (#85000901) | Address Restricted | Onemile Camp | |
| 3 | Helena Historic District | Helena Historic District | May 24, 1984 (#84001219) | North of U.S. Route 299, W., on the North Fork of the Trinity River; 40°46′29″N 123°07′41″W | Helena | |
| 4 | Lewiston Historic District | Lewiston Historic District | April 17, 1989 (#88000550) | Roughly Deadwood, Turnpike, and Schoolhouse Rds. 40°42′30″N 122°48′17″W | Lewiston | |
| 5 | Weaverville Historic District | Weaverville Historic District | October 14, 1971 (#71000209) | Both sides of Main St. 40°43′57″N 122°56′22″W | Weaverville | |

== See also ==
- List of National Historic Landmarks in California
- National Register of Historic Places listings in California
- California Historical Landmarks in Trinity County, California
