= La Grange Mine =

Coordinates: 40°44′28″N 122°59′26″W

- Interactive map of La Grange Mine
- Location: Trinity County, California; Along California State Route 299, about 4 miles (6.4 km) west of Weaverville, California

History
- Founded: 1862
- Demolished: 1918 (closed)

California Historical Landmark
- Designated: 1962
- Reference no.: 778

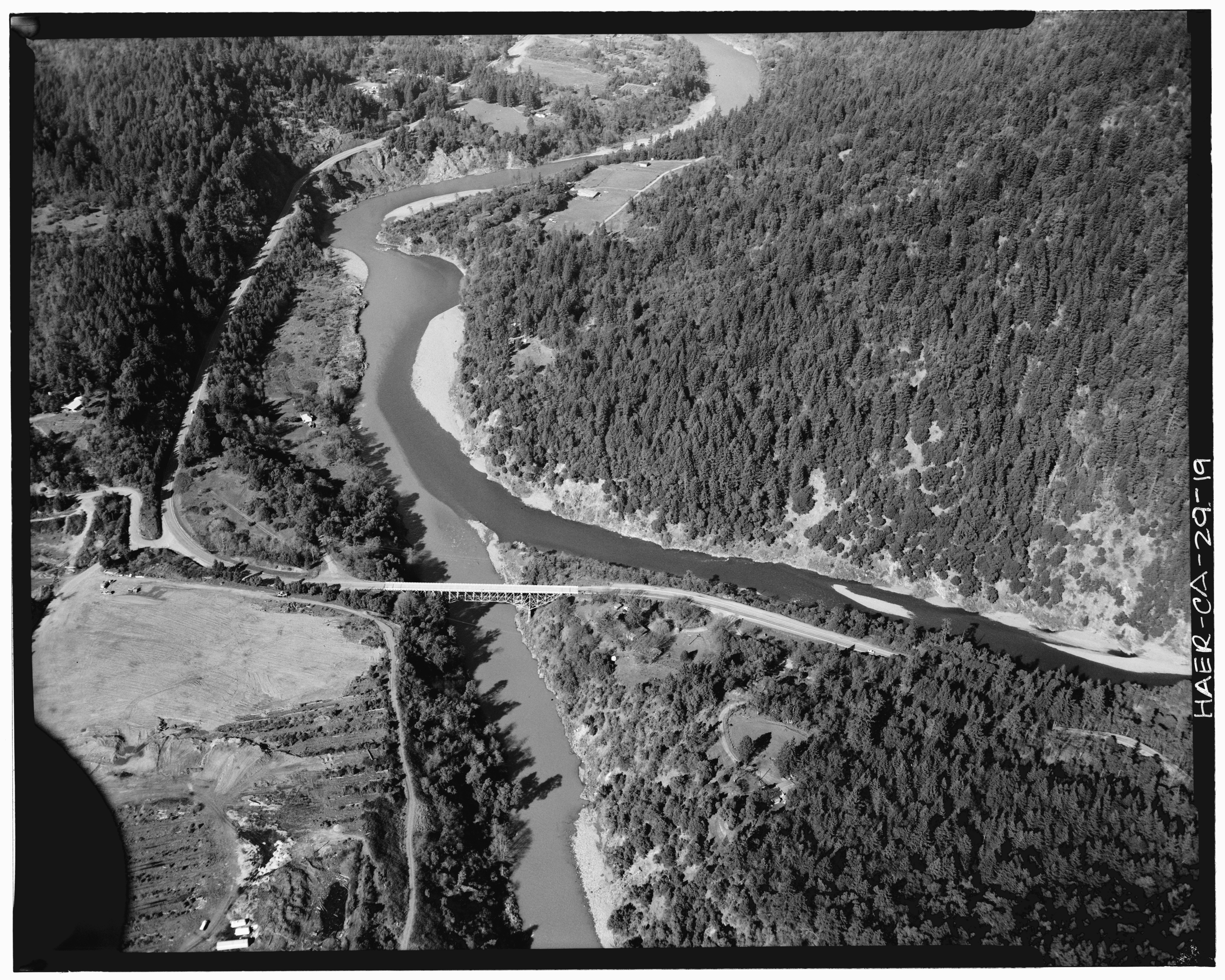
The Trinity River near the La Grange Mine

The La Grange Mine is a former mine located in Trinity County, California. At one time it was the largest hydraulic mine in California. Started operating in 1862, over 3,500,000 dollars of gold was extracted before it was closed down in 1918 due to rising costs of labor and steel after World War I. The quality of gold was low so hydraulic mining was used to take it from the ground. The site is now a California Historical Landmark.

The name comes from the owner who bought it in 1893, the French baron Ernest de la Grange. He came from North of France with his wife (Clémentine de Chaumont Quitry) and his two children (Emilie and Amaury de la Grange)

== See also ==
- California Historical Landmarks in Trinity County, California
- List of California Historical Landmarks
