= California Historical Landmarks in Trinity County =

This list includes properties and districts listed on the California Historical Landmark listing in Trinity County, California. Click the "Map of all coordinates" link to the right to view a Google map of all properties and districts with latitude and longitude coordinates in the table below.

Image		Landmark name	Location	City or town	Summary
La Grange Mine	778	La Grange Mine	State Hwy 299; 40°44′28″N 122°59′26″W	Weaverville	
Weaverville Joss House	709	Weaverville Joss House	Weaverville Joss House State Historic Park; 40°43′52″N 122°56′27″W	Weaverville	

== See also ==
- List of California Historical Landmarks
- National Register of Historic Places listings in Trinity County, California
