= History of Covington, Kentucky =

The history of Covington, Kentucky began in 1815, with the city's founding.

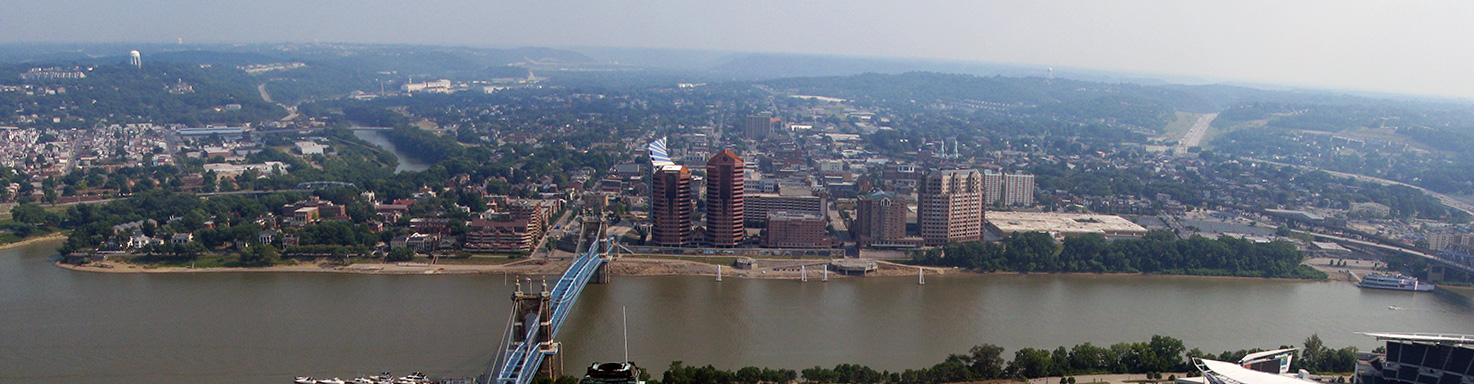
Skyline of Covington Kentucky

== Founding ==
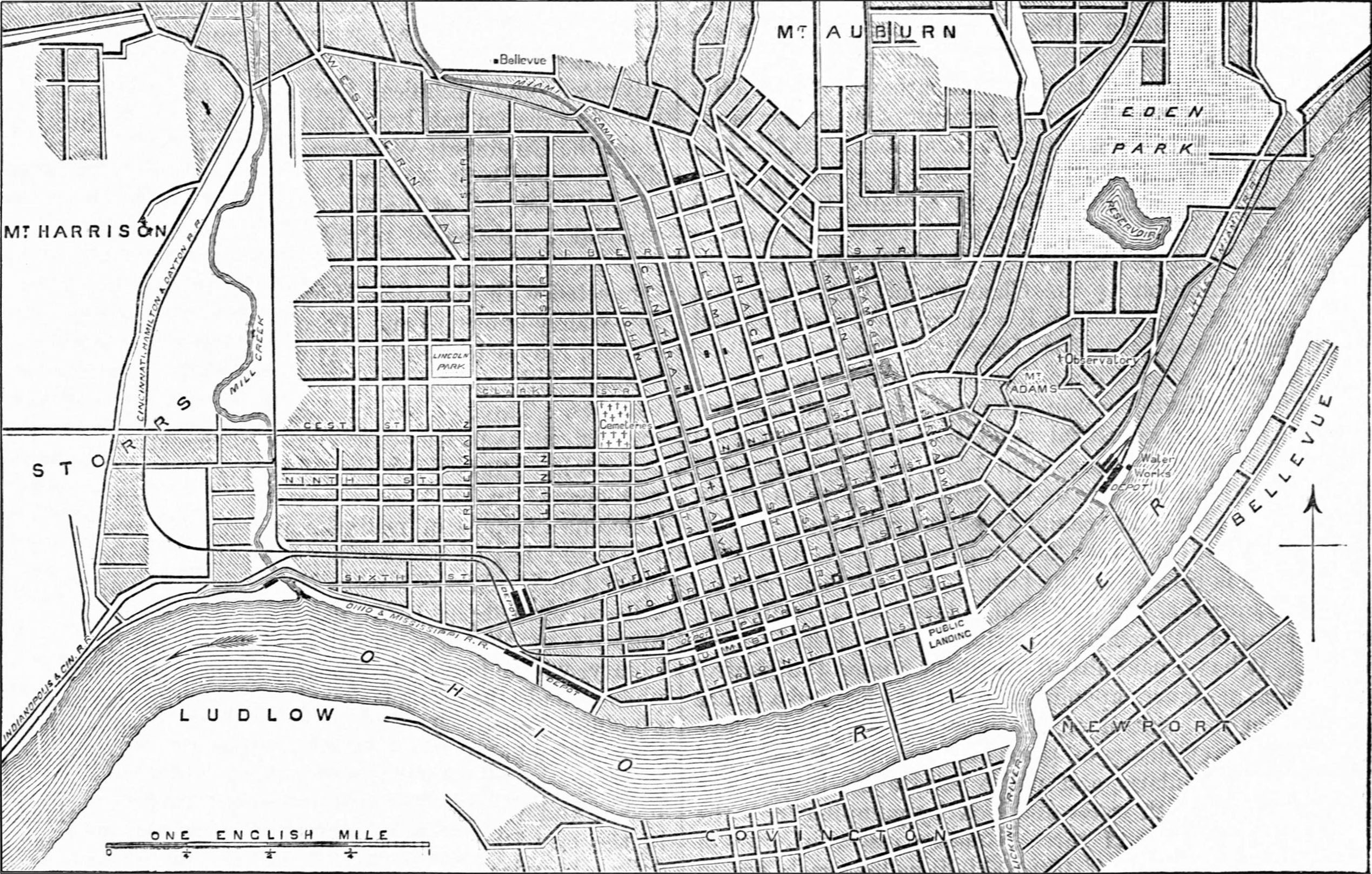
The "Plan of Cincinnati" from the 1878 Encyclopaedia Britannica, showing the layout of downtown Covington and Newport to the south

In 1814, John Gano, Richard Gano, and Thomas Carneal purchased 150 acres (0.6 km^{2}) on the west side of the Licking River at its confluence with the Ohio River, referred to as "the Point," from Thomas Kennedy for $50,000. The men named their new riverfront enterprise the "Covington Company," in honor of their friend, Gen. Leonard Covington, an American officer who once trained troops in the area and was killed in the War of 1812 at Crysler's Farm.

The investors prepared a plat for the new city that was approximately five blocks wide by five blocks deep. The platted streets lined up with the streets of Cincinnati across the Ohio River, symbolically tying the future of the fledgling city to its larger neighbor to the north. The first five streets, running north to south, were named for Kentucky's first five governors: Shelby, Garrard, Greenup, Scott, and Madison.

In February 1815, the Kentucky General Assembly incorporated the land as the town of Covington. At the time of its incorporation, Covington and all of today's Kenton County was a part of Campbell County. Shortly after its incorporation, the investors began selling lots in the new city for $385 a lot. However, for the next 15 years, lot sales were slow and disappointing. By 1830, the young city had a population of only 715 and lot prices were selling for half their value in 1815.

== Housing and population growth ==
After 1830, in large part because of the influx of German immigrants, Covington's population began to grow significantly, creating a number of distinct and diverse neighborhoods within the city. This growth was recognized by the Kentucky legislature, which, in February 1834, incorporated the town as a city. By 1840, the population in the city increased to 2,026, which included eleven free blacks and 89 slaves.

=== Mutter Gottes/Old Town and Mainstrasse ===
This population resided not only within the established boundaries of the city but outside, causing the city to undertake its first annexation, which extended the city to Main Street to the west and 12th Street to the south. This annexation brought the neighborhoods now known as Mutter Gottes/Old Town and Mainstrasse.

Fueled in part by the European revolutions of the mid-19th century, many Europeans, particularly Germans, immigrated to Covington. At this time, the primary commercial district and gathering place was on Main Street near Sixth Street, the area now known as "Mainstrasse." Sixth Street was laid out with a wide width that allowed the city, in 1861, to establish a public market in the center of the street with traffic lanes on either side. The nearby Mutter Gottes Kirche (Mother of God Church), built in 1871, was the center of another German-speaking neighborhood.

=== Old Seminary Square and Westside ===
At the same time the western area of the city was growing, development began to stretch to the south. In the late 1830s, the Western Baptist Education Society purchased 370 acres (1.5 km^{2}), which would define the city's southern boundary in 1841. On this tract, the organization established a seminary and set aside 22 acres (89,000 m^{2}) for a cemetery, which in 1843 would become known as Linden Grove Cemetery, the final resting place for several Civil War soldiers. To raise money to build its campus, the Baptists entered into the real estate market, subdividing the land and selling lots around its campus and cemetery. Many graves were left untouched as the building of structures progressed into an area now known as Old Seminary Square, Mainstrasse Village and the Westside. In 1843, the city annexed most of the Society's subdivisions, which expanded the city's boundaries to 15th Street.

Within two years of opening the Western Baptist Theological Institute on Russell Street in 1845, the trustees of the organization became embroiled over the slavery issue. This ultimately ended with the dissolution of the institute in 1853 and the division of the property between the opposing factions. At the same time, the tracks for the Covington and Lexington Railroad were laid in the area, bisecting the college campus. Fifteen years later, the original St. Elizabeth Hospital moved into one of the old college buildings, where it operated from 1868 to 1911.

=== Austinburg and Lewisburg ===
At the same time that the Society was developing its property, Seneca Austin and his wife purchased and started developing 80 acres (320,000 m^{2}) along the Licking River from approximately 16th Street to 20th Street, creating the neighborhood we now call Austinburg. In 1851, the city annexed all of the Austins' land to Wallace Avenue as well as the western neighborhood now known as Lewisburg. Both communities were settled by largely German contingents, who established churches and parishes as focal points in their communities: St. Benedict's Catholic Church and parish in Austinburg, and St. John's the Evangelist Catholic Church and parish in Lewisburg.

Facade of St. Benedict's Catholic Church by Br. Paul Byrd, OP

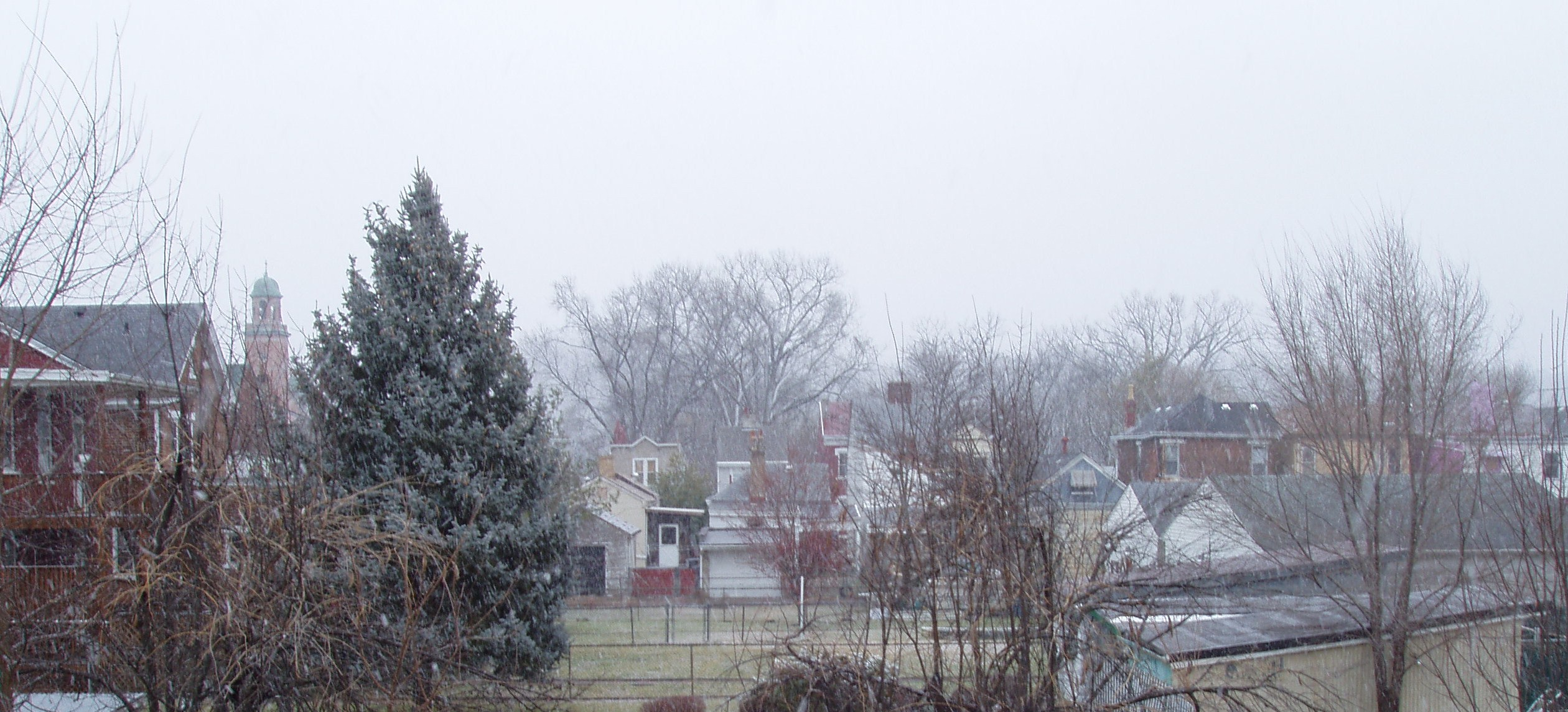
A snow storm in Austinburg, looking east toward the Licking River.

=== Wallace Woods and Levassor Park ===
Immediately south of Austinburg were three large estates owned Robert Wallace, Daniel Holmes, and Eugene Levassor, all of whom were successful merchants.

In 1867, on 17 acres (69,000 m^{2}) that he had acquired next to the Wallace and Levassor estates, Holmes constructed a 32-room redbrick English-Gothic "castle," which was called Holmesdale. After Holmes died and his wife and children had returned to their native New Orleans, the family sold the mansion and 13 acres (53,000 m^{2}) to the Covington Board of Education in 1915. The mansion served as the Covington High School until 1936, when the structure was razed and a new high school was constructed. This building and five others now occupy the former estate grounds as part of the Holmes High School campus.

In the 1890s, the Wallace and Levassor estates on either side of the Holmes estate were developed, creating upscale neighborhoods at the end of the streetcar line. Many stately homes were constructed on large lots in these neighborhoods.

=== Peaselburg ===
Just west of Wallace Woods and the railroad tracks, a German, working-class neighborhood developed in the latter years of the 19th century. This community was known by its inhabitants as "Peaselburg." In 1880, the community incorporated as an independent municipality and changed its name to Central Covington. In 1894, the Wallace Woods heirs agreed to be annexed by far less wealthy Central Covington because its tax rates were substantially lower than those assessed by the City of Covington.

The next year, Covington attempted to annex Central Covington, but support for the effort did not materialize. However, a decade later, many Central Covington businesses and homes were flooded by the eruption of a major sewer line. Covington offered to help the smaller municipality but only if the residents agreed to annexation, which occurred in 1907. Thus, Central Covington (and indirectly Wallace Woods) became a part of Covington. Six years later, St. Augustine Catholic Church was constructed on 19th Street, serving as this neighborhood's focal point and community gathering place.

=== Latonia and Rosedale ===
In 1882, a group of investors formed the Latonia Agricultural and Stock Association to create a horseracing track south of Covington. Purchasing more than 100 acres (0.4 km^{2}) north of Banklick Creek in an area then known as Milldale, and using the name of the nearby resort of Latonia Springs, the investors renamed this area Latonia. The track opened in June 1883, but it wasn't until 1890 that Kenton County granted the Covington electric streetcar company the right to lay tracks from the Covington city boundary to this area of the county.

In 1896, a portion of this area was incorporated as the city of Latonia, with a starting population of about 1,500. Adjacent to Latonia to the south was a community known as Rosedale, which was actually a part of Latonia. In 1909, Covington annexed Latonia and Rosedale, in part to relieve Latonia of financial difficulties it was encountering.

=== West Covington ===
The independent city of West Covington, formerly known as Economy and now known as Botany Hills, is located along the Ohio River on the hills west of downtown Covington. This city was platted in 1846 and St. Ann's Church was constructed in the area in 1862 and served this primarily German-Catholic community. After an unsuccessful attempt to annex this city in 1873, Covington annexed it in 1916, in part because of water problems in the area and a lack of a high school.

=== Smaller annexations in the mid 20th century ===
After the annexation of West Covington in 1916, the boundaries of Covington remained the same for the next 35 years while other municipalities were established in areas surrounding Covington, such as Park Hills, Fort Wright, and Lakeside Park, to name a few. In the 1950s and 1960s, the city annexed small tracts of land – 34 acres (140,000 m^{2}) in Lewisburg in 1951, 70 acres (280,000 m^{2}) in Latonia in 1956, and 47 acres (190,000 m^{2}) that was formerly occupied by a Benedictine Monastery (now the Monte Casino neighborhood) in 1963 – but these annexations were of a small scale compared to tracts annexed during the first 100 years of the city's existence.

=== 1960s annexations (Kenton Hills and South Covington) ===
During the 1960s, the city annexed a considerable amount of property that would establish the current boundaries of the city. Starting in 1965, the city annexed 212 acres (0.9 km^{2}) near Kyles Lane. In 1965, the city added 72 acres (290,000 m^{2}) near Devou Park, which was then known and is still known as Kenton Hills. Finally, in 1965, the city undertook its biggest annexation effort ever when it added 4,000 acres (16 km^{2}) of unincorporated land in Kenton County south of Latonia, creating the community now known as South Covington.

== Population growth ==
The population of Covington grew from 743 in 1830 to 24,505 in 1870 to 42,938 in 1900. From this number, the population grew to its highest recorded count – 65,252 – in 1930. Perhaps due to problems associated with the Great Depression in the 1930s, U.S. Census Bureau recorded the city's first drop in population in its history in 1940, when the population was documented at 62,018. For the next two decades, the population would remain in the low- to middle- 60,000s. Due in large part to urban flight that occurred in the 1960s and 1970s, the city's population dropped from 60,376 in 1960 to the lowest recorded census count in recent history in 2010, 40,640. In the most recent U.S. Census estimate, conducted in 2014, the city's population increased slightly to 40,944.

== Economic growth ==
=== First commercial development ===
In its infancy, most of the commerce in Covington was connected with the rivers that formed the northern and eastern boundaries of the city. Because the Kentucky side of the Ohio River was relatively shallow compared to the Ohio side of the river, Covington was never able to develop its riverfront as a viable public landing for boats and steamships, which instead moored on the Cincinnati side of the river, where steamship building facilities were located.

The city's first manufacturing concern, a cotton factory, was built near the river in 1828, and three years later, another business, a rolling mill and nail factory, was established along Scott Street near the riverfront.

=== First commercial center ===
The first commercial center of the city was established around the "public square" platted between Third and Fourth Streets and Scott Boulevard and Greenup Street. At this location, a market house was constructed in 1831 and a public well was dug approximately one block from the square. During the 1830s, along with the public market, retail stores, businesses offices, and other commercial establishments flourished in this area.

In the mid-19th century, two things promoted the growth of Covington. First, in 1840, the Kentucky General Assembly severed Kenton County from Campbell County. Despite the legislative directive that county seat be at the center of the county, Covington served as the de facto county seat until the City of Independence was incorporated in 1842.

Because Independence was sparsely populated and approximately 12 miles (19 km) from Covington, the residents and lawyers of the thriving urban area found it more convenient to transact business and administer justice at the Covington courthouse, which was constructed near the public square in 1843. Recognizing that Covington was serving as the de facto county seat, the Kentucky legislature, in 1860, enacted a law authorizing Covington as the site for the recording of deeds and mortgages – making Kenton County only one of two counties in Kentucky with dual county seats (the other being Newport and Alexandria in Campbell County).

=== Madison and Pike Street commercial corridor ===
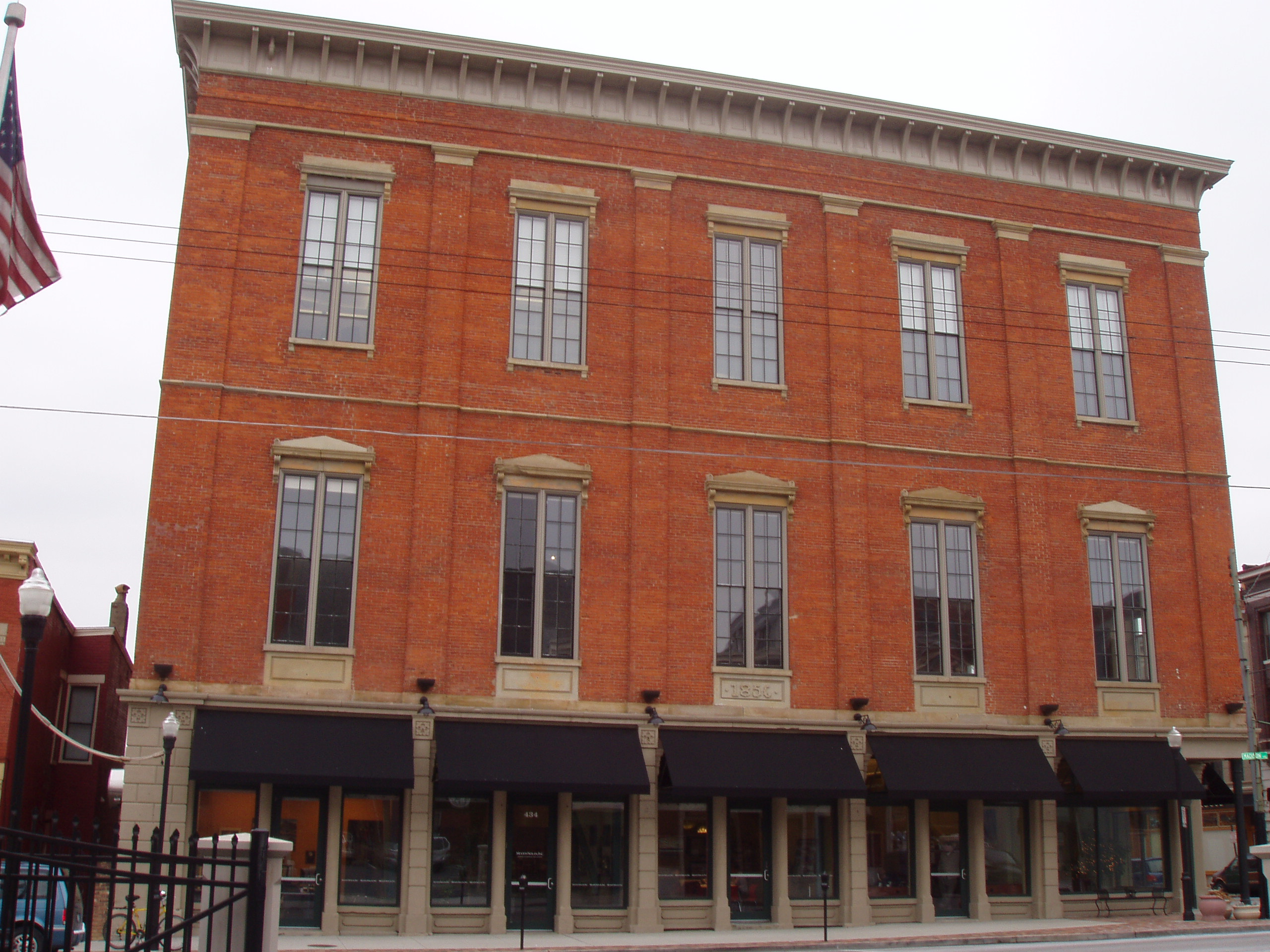
Restored, Odd Fellows Hall, on Madison Ave.

The other major development occurring during this time period was the construction of the Covington and Lexington Railroad in 1853. While the public square remained a hub for the "courthouse crowd," in large part because of the railroad, the area of Madison Avenue and Pike Street became the city's primary commercial center during the rest of 19th century and into the 20th century.

With a train stop at Russell and Pike Streets, which was also near the terminus of the Covington and Lexington Turnpike, the area of the city soon became a beehive of commercial activity. Packing houses, groceries, dry goods stores, meat markets, printers, jewelers, saloons, lumber yards, machine shops, hardware stores, and more than 20 hotels cropped up in this area of the city.

In the years following the Civil War, Covington largely prospered as a result of the city's access to the tobacco grown around the Bluegrass, with numerous cigar factories around the town. Its iron mills, distilleries, glassworks, and stove makers were also noteworthy. Birdsill Holly's innovative water supply network was introduced in 1871.

As with Cincinnati, many immigrants to the area were German and many were Catholic. A parochial orphanage was established about 4 miles outside town, and the St Elizabeth Hospital and the Benedictine priory of St Joseph and nunnery of St Walburga were among the city's principal buildings.

By the time of the First World War, Covington was serviced by the Chesapeake & Ohio and Louisville & Nashville railroads. It was the state's second-largest city and its second-largest municipal economy. It received a Catholic bishopric and a Gothic cathedral. Its factories at the time had grown to include textile mills, foundries, machine shops, and cordage makers.

=== Covington-Cincinnati Suspension Bridge ===
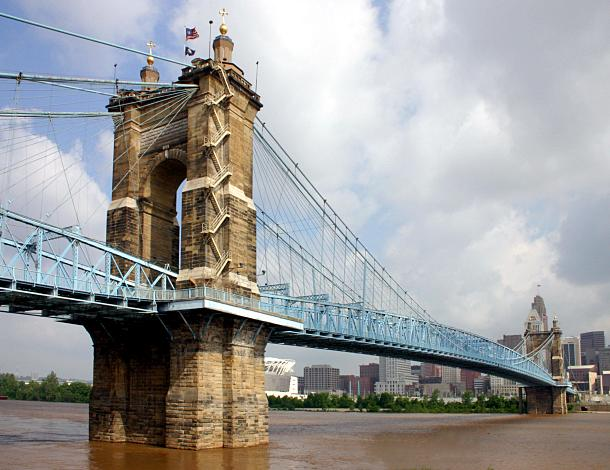
A view of the John A. Roebling Suspension Bridge from Covington on the south bank of the Ohio River with Cincinnati in the background.

The next major project that spurred the economic growth of Covington was the decade-long construction of the Covington-Cincinnati Suspension Bridge between Covington and Cincinnati. Built by John A. Roebling, construction started in 1856. Work on the bridge continued for two years before the effects of the 1857 depression brought construction to a halt. Work on the bridge resumed in 1863 but once again was delayed because of the Civil War. The bridge formally opened on January 1, 1867, promoting further commerce between Kentucky and Ohio.

In part because of depressions of 1873 and 1893, commercial construction was not significant in Covington during the latter part of the 19th century. However, that would change dramatically in the early 20th century for a number of reasons.

One of these reasons was that the Suspension Bridge – originally designed for horse cars and pedestrians – was reconstructed in the late 1890s to accommodate electric streetcars – and in a few years, automobiles. During the early 20th century, many new commercial and governmental structures were constructed in Covington.

=== Heyday ===
The heyday for Covington as the commercial center for all of Northern Kentucky was the first two decades of the 20th century. During these decades, particularly the 1920s, the city's downtown was a bustling place of activity, with numerous restaurants, department stores, shops, saloons, banks, theaters, and offices bringing swarms of people to the downtown commercial district.

Among the buildings that were constructed during this high-growth period were several near the public square, such as the city and county building, dedicated in 1902 and the Cincinnati, Newport, and Covington Railway Company headquarters, completed in 1903 (later acquired by the Citizens Telephone Company), to name a few. In addition, a number of other commercial structures were constructed in the downtown commercial district that survive today, such as the Masonic Lodge at the corner of Fourth and Scott Boulevard, the Kentucky Times-Star Building in the 500 block of Scott, the Edward Pieck pharmacy building located on the corner of Sixth and Main Street, and the Greyhound Bus Station building at the southeast corner of Fifth Street and Madison Avenue.

It was also during this time period that Covington became the financial center of Northern Kentucky, housing the following lending institutions, primarily on Madison Avenue: the First National Bank, German National Bank, Covington Savings Bank & Trust Co., Citizens National Bank, and Peoples Savings Bank and Trust Company, to name a few.

This was also a period when the manufacturing industry significantly increased in Covington. Of particular note was the growth of The Stewart Iron Work Company, which employed as many as 600 people in 1915. It was a highly guarded secret that Stewart Iron Works made the special "non-sawable" bars for the cells at Alcatraz Prison. The Bavarian Brewery was a large employer in the west side with strong sales until Prohibition in 1918. Other manufacturing firms that operated during this time period include the United States Motor Truck Company and Kelley-Koett Manufacturing Corp. of Covington, Ky., one of the country's earliest manufacturers of x-ray accessories and equipment. Known for many of its beautiful churches, this was also the time frame during which one of the city's icons, St. Mary's Basilica Cathedral of the Assumption, was built; it was dedicated in 1910. It was also during this time frame when the city acquired two of its most prized parks: Goebel Park in the Mainstrasse neighborhood and Devou Park, more than 500 acres (2 km^{2}) of pristine land in the western hills of the city.

=== Decline ===
While the Great Depression of the 1930s devastated many Covington businesses and residents, the city's decline did not become pronounced until the 1960s. As mentioned above, the city's population remained somewhat stagnant for three decades. But post-World War II urban flight, coupled with a substantial reduction in the city's manufacturing sector, caused a significant decline in the city's workforce as well as its resident population.

If the 1920s was the last great decade for Covington, then the 1970s – and to a certain extent the early 1980s – was the nadir for the city, at least with respect to its downtown. Despite construction of the IRS service center by the federal government in the 1960s, which brought many new jobs to the city, the city began a downward spiral of disinvestment, which continued for several decades. In fact, in the late 1970s, the U.S. Department of Housing and Urban Development identified Covington as one of the country's "most distressed cities."

During this time period, as new retail centers and malls grew in the suburbs, long-established Covington retail firms either closed or left downtown Covington. Among the stores and shops that left or closed were Goldsmith's Department Store, Eilermann's Department Store, Coppin's Department Store, Montgomery Ward, S.S. Kresge Co., Herzog's, Louis Marx & Sons Furniture, Modern Furniture, Woolworth's, Penney's, Sears, the First National Bank, and the Madison and Liberty theatres, to name a few. Many of these storefronts remained empty during this time period or were replaced with less attractive commercial endeavors or social service agencies.

=== Rebirth ===
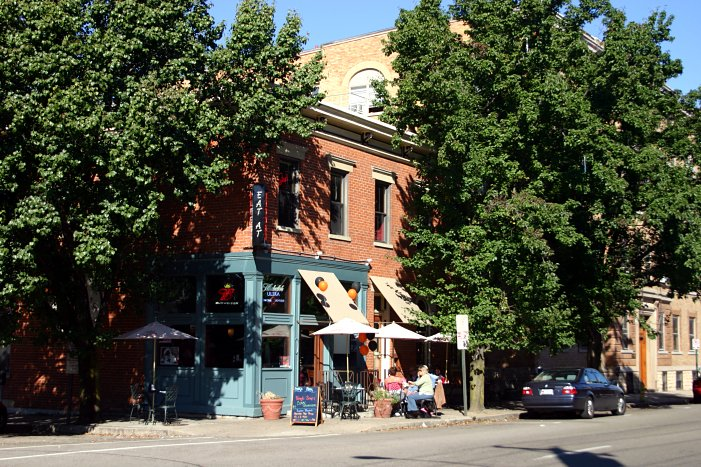
Covington's downtown neighborhoods have many wooded streets and historic buildings, some of which date to the nineteenth century.

Beginning in the mid-to-late-1980s, Covington began its revival. New buildings were constructed, jobs were created, and the population loss began to stabilize.

The rebirth of Covington as a commercial center occurred in the same place where the city commercial growth first occurred – along the Ohio River and in one of the city's first commercial districts, Main Street. The rebirth on the river began modestly in 1984 when developer David Herriman built the $4.4-million, 34-unit Riverside Terrace condominium complex on Riverside Drive. Two years later, Herriman constructed the 43-unit Riverside Plaza, a companion condominium project just south of Riverside Terrace, for $7.5 million.

With the city and state investing approximately $7 million in infrastructure improvements in the late 1970s and early 1980s, including construction of the 100-foot (30 m) Carroll Chimes Bell Tower with its carillon and glockenspiel in Goebel Park, Main Street and Sixth Street was renamed "Mainstrasse," and returned to its roots as a German village with restaurants, taverns, and specialty retail shops.

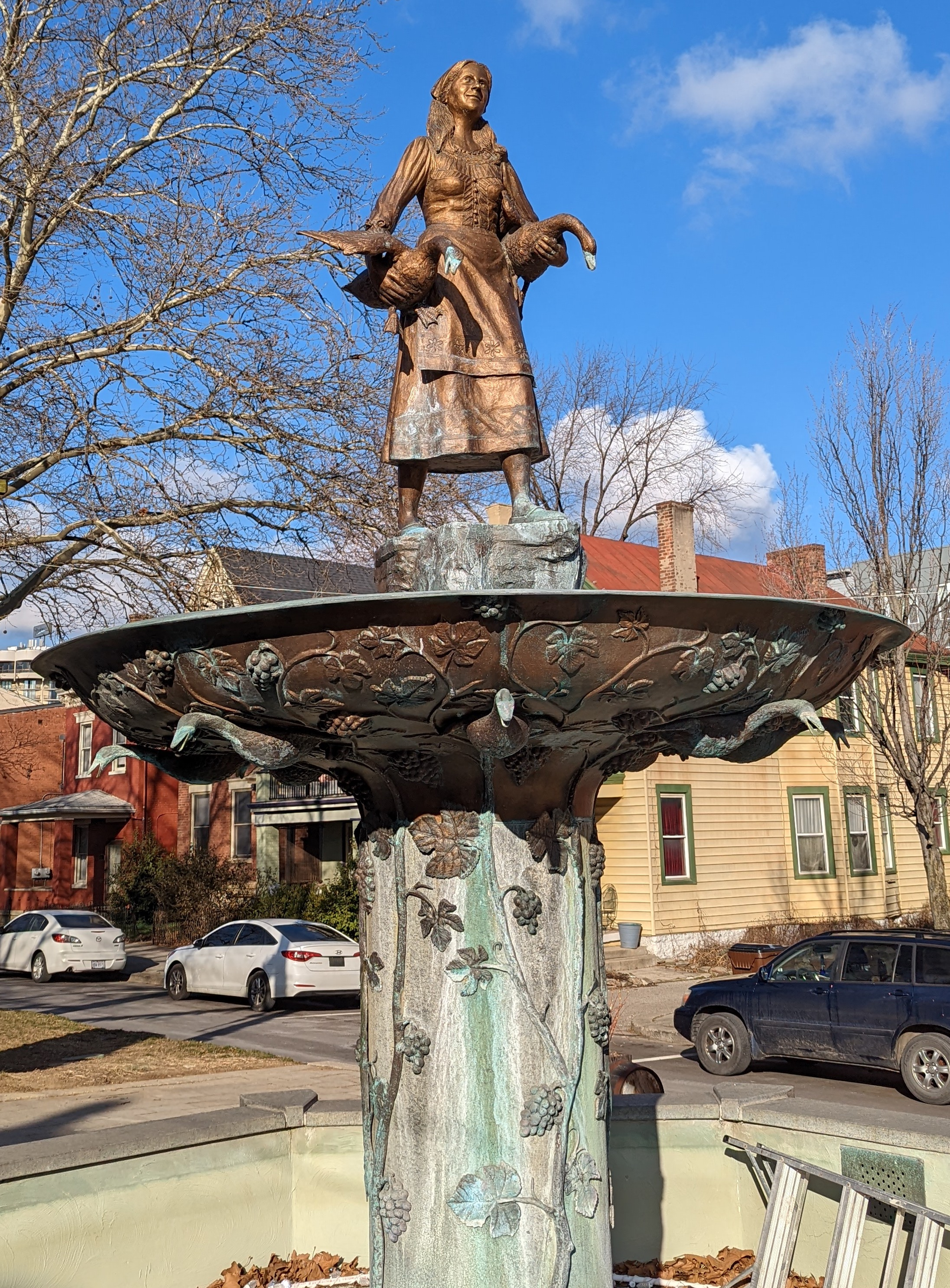
Goose Girl Fountain in Mainstrasse

In the mid-to-late-1980s, the city, using state and local funds, began acquiring properties along the Ohio River for redevelopment. In 1988, the city and local developer Corporex entered into a master development agreement to redevelop the city's riverfront, which kicked the city's renaissance into high gear. The first phase of this redevelopment occurred in 1990 when the $110-million, 18-story Rivercenter office tower and a 230-room Embassy Suites hotel was built atop a 1,100-space parking garage constructed by the city.

In 1994, Fidelity Investments established a 188-acre (0.8 km^{2}) campus in Covington, constructing three office buildings on the campus, totaling approximately 780,000 square feet (72,000 m^{2}) and employing 2,000 employees. At the same time the Fidelity campus was underway, Wessels Construction built the IRS Gateway Center on Scott Boulevard, between Third and Fourth Streets, which would employ approximately 2,000 IRS employees when completed.

In 1997, Rivercenter II was built next to Corporex's first downtown office tower, and during the same year, across Madison Avenue from the Rivercenter complex, a new garage was funded by the Commonwealth of Kentucky and built by Corporex. A year after the garage was finished, a 300-room Marriott hotel was built atop a portion of the garage. Two years later, on the remaining portion of the parking garage, eleven floors of office space was constructed, now known as Madison Place, and on top of this office space four floors of multimillion-dollar residential condominiums called Domaine de la Rive were built.

In 1998, across the street from the Marriott hotel, the Commonwealth of Kentucky contributed $30.5 million to build the Northern Kentucky Convention Center. In 2001, a block away from the convention center, Wessels Construction would add a 110,000-square-foot (10,000 m^{2}) expansion of the Gateway Center on Madison Avenue and Third Street. Another block away, Towne Properties would build Roebling Row Apartments, an 86-unit luxury apartment building with architectural features compatible with nearby structures in the surrounding historic Licking Riverside neighborhood.

Meanwhile, a housing boom was taking place in the southern part of the city. Among new subdivisions built in South Covington in the 1990s were Ridgeport (275 homes), Clover Meadow (88 homes), and Heathermoor (100 upscale homes).

== 21st century ==
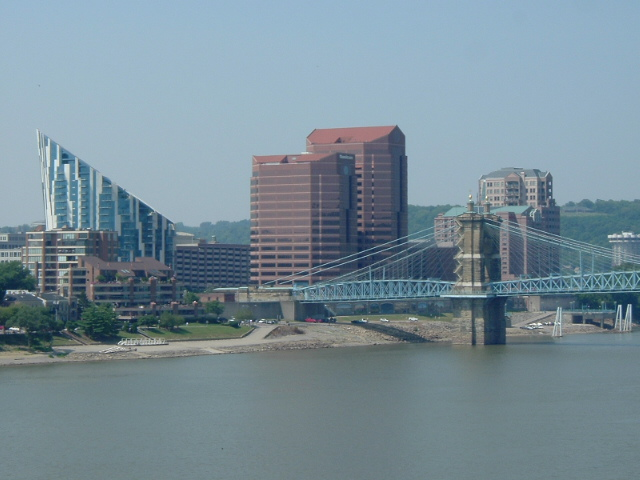
Skyline of downtown Covington

Covington has continued its struggle to rebound into the 21st century. The redevelopment along the riverfront in the 1980s and 1990s slowly moved southward into the downtown area. A few existing structures were rehabilitated and new businesses located there, but by December 2011, nearly one third of the commercial spaces still remained vacant.

In 2005, in an attempt to attract the "creative class" into the commercial district, the City of Covington created the Covington Arts and Technology Zone ("CATZ") on Pike Street . After six years of struggling, it became obvious to city leaders that it did not work as a redevelopment tool and the City Commission voted to repeal the "Covington Arts and Technology Zone" in 2011.

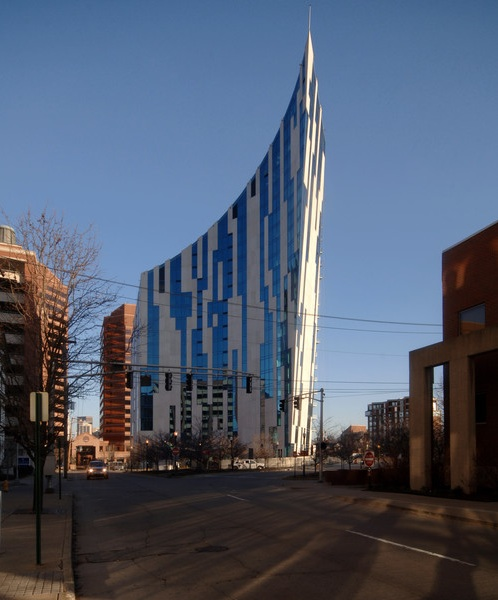
The Ascent at Roebling's Bridge

In 2008, Corporex completed the 22-story luxury condominium project, The Ascent at Roebling's Bridge. Designed by world-renowned architect Daniel Libeskind, with help from local architect GBBN, the wedge-shaped structure won the 2008 CNBC property award for best high-rise in the Americas, and was a featured project in the AIA April 2008 newsletter.

=== Viral video controversy ===
On January 19, 2019, a video appearing to involve students from Covington Catholic High School and a Native American man engaged in a form of conflict was released and quickly gained attention. As a result, Covington city officials have reported receiving threats of violence toward them, as well as the city itself. A "suspicious package" was also found outside of the Diocese of Covington. However, despite the school's name, Covington Catholic High School is not located in Covington, Kentucky, but in Park Hills, Kentucky, which is a neighboring city.

In response to the increasing calls for boycotts against Covington and its businesses, hostilities toward the city, and calls for violence, due to the misidentification, Covington's mayor, Joe Meyer, released a statement on the issue, saying in part "Over the past few days, we at the City of Covington have been cursed and threatened by email, over the phone, and in person. Our City is collateral damage in an incident that had nothing to do with us, happened 500 miles away, and coincidentally involves a school that actually isn’t even in Covington."

== Covington's Neighborhood Movement ==
Covington owes many of its more recent accomplishments to the action of dedicated residents and neighborhood groups. The first round of this neighborhood movement came about in the mid-to-late-1970s as part of a reformist movement to improve the city. Many neighborhood associations were formed at the time, and the Covington Neighborhood Action Coalition, or CNAC, was established. CNAC served as an umbrella organization for many active neighborhood associations, with each organization having delegates as part of annual CNAC conventions. CNAC addressed citywide concerns and endorsed neighborhood issues, such as opposition to the proposed location of a coal dock in Latonia and advocating for the improvement of sewers in Peaselburg.

CNAC also received federal funding from the Law Enforcement Assistance Administration (LEAA) to create the city's first block watch, a forerunner to today's Neighborhood Watch. The neighborhood movement reached its peak in the early 1980s. By the mid-1980s, CNAC membership waned as many citywide issues had been addressed and no funding was available for staff assistance to the neighborhood groups. Several neighborhood associations, such as those in Wallace Woods and Licking Riverside, persisted despite the decline of CNAC.

The Neighborhood Watch Program began in 1985 when Latonia residents began organizing neighborhood watches after a murder and several break-ins in their neighborhood. Watch members work closely with the Covington Police and Code Enforcement Departments and play an instrumental role in making our community safer.

In 1996, residents initiated a call for a new CNAC-like organization. At the same time, the Center for Great Neighborhoods of Covington, then known as the Covington Community Center, was reorganizing and defining strategic growth areas for its organization. At the request of residents, the Center agreed to help organize and staff the new organization, the Covington Neighborhood Collaborative. Today, CNC has 12 member organizations and works on both citywide and neighborhood issues. Several other neighborhoods, including the Eastside, South Covington, and Mainstrasse, also have active neighborhood associations that are not currently a part of CNC.
