= Seminary Square Historic District =

Historic district in Kentucky, United States

- U.S. National Register of Historic Places
- U.S. Historic district
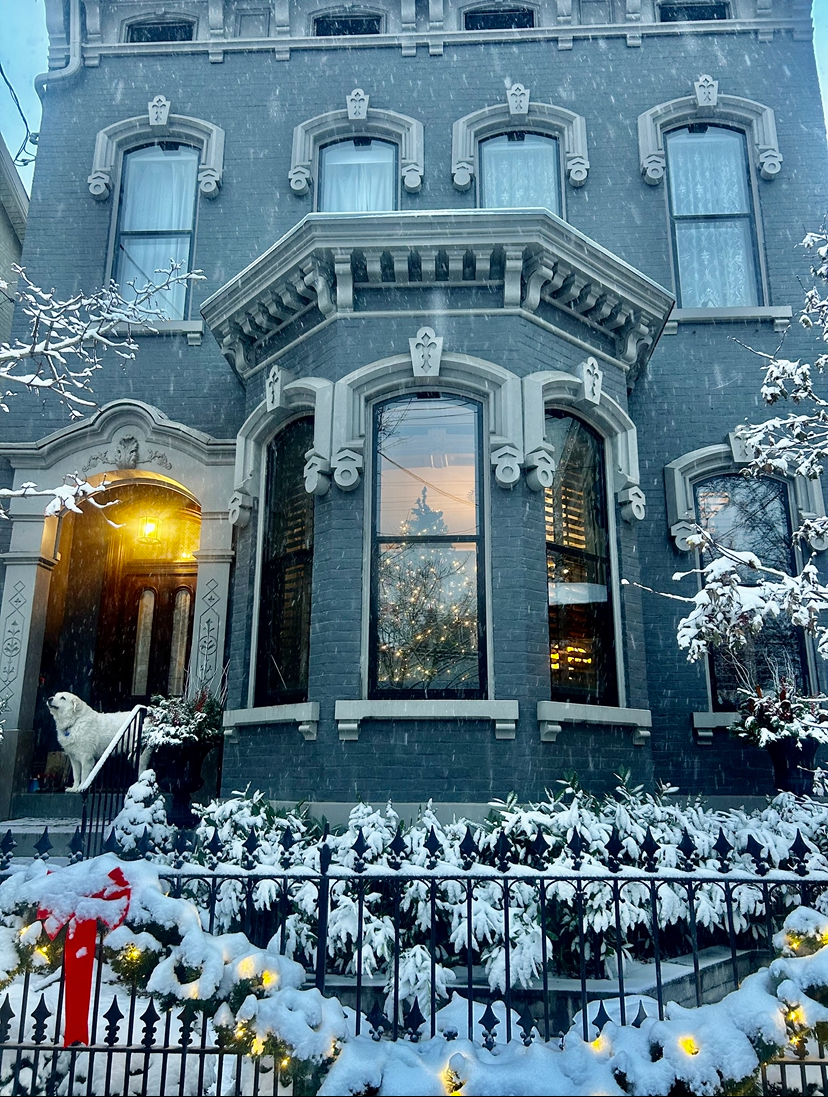
- The Harriet Albro House c. 1874

- Location within Kentucky Location within the United States
- Location: Roughly bounded by CSX Transportation railroad tracks, Banklick Street, Eighth and Twelfth Streets, Covington, Kentucky
- Coordinates: 39°4′45″N 84°30′45.32″W
- Area: 18 acres (7.3 ha)
- Architectural style: Second Empire, Italianate, Victorian
- NRHP reference No.: 80001647
- Added to NRHP: May 27, 1980

The Seminary Square Historic District, also known as Old Seminary Square, is a historic district and residential neighborhood located in Covington, Kentucky.

== History ==
The Seminary Square Historic District traces its origins and namesake to the Western Baptist Theological Institute, established in the 1830s. In 1833, the institute purchased the Sandford House and surrounding acres to establish the first Baptist seminary west of the Alleghenies. Internal conflict over slavery led to the seminary's closure in 1853, after which its property was sold and divided, and the Kentucky Central Railroad bisected the former college square, erasing its footprint. The institute's land holdings were subdivided and sold for residential development, laying the groundwork for the neighborhood and historic district.

After the Civil War, the neighborhood became a fashionable residential area, with many affluent and influential families building homes there. Its elevation above the Ohio and Licking Rivers, along with its distance from the riverfront, provided a healthier, less flood-prone environment than lower-lying neighborhoods like Licking-Riverside, while retaining proximity to downtown commerce. By the 1870s, more than 150 homes had been constructed in the area.

=== Urban decline and revitalization ===
By the mid‑20th century, many Seminary Square homes had been converted into multi-family and rental properties which were poorly maintained, reflecting broader urban decline in Covington and the greater Cincinnati area, following post-World War II suburbanization and economic shifts.

Beginning in the mid‑1970s, a small group of residents began purchasing and rehabilitating Victorian homes that had fallen into neglect, sparking one of the neighborhood's earliest waves of historic preservation and reinvestment. These early "rehabbers" helped revive interest in the district's architectural heritage and laid the groundwork for a broader community renewal that continues through active neighborhood association and preservation efforts. Today, the neighborhood is known for its Victorian architecture, community, and hosts seasonal events, including Christmas Walks and Garden Tours.

== Architecture ==
The district is primarily characterized by Victorian-era residential architecture, with Italianate as the dominant style. Most structures in the Seminary Square Historic District are oriented to the street, with narrow lots, shallow setbacks, and detailed iron fences. Construction dates range from the early 19th to early 20th centuries, with a predominance of 19th-century townhouses and multiple-family dwellings. Later 19th-century construction reflects Second Empire styles, often featuring mansard roofs, bargeboarding, gables, and dormers.

Notable buildings include:

- Alfred Sandford House (c. 1820): The oldest structure in the district, originally Federal-style, later altered in the Victorian period with a mansard roof, octagonal bay, and decorative hood molds. The house is one of the oldest standing buildings in Kenton County.
- James Fisk House (1017 Russell Street, c. 1865): Italianate townhouse with elaborate stone trim and Gothic Revival colonettes.
- William E. Ashbrook House (1010 Russell Street, late 1860s): Three-story townhouse with stone foundation, semi-octagonal bay, and ornate detailing on a large, corner lot.
- Harriett Albro House (1041 Russell Street, c. 1874): Brick Italianate townhouse with exceptional stone entrance detailing surrounding an Eastlake-style door and elaborate interior wood and plasterwork. The house was built for Harriet Albro following the death of her husband, Henry Albro, a prominent Cincinnati sawmill owner. The house was restored in the 1970s by Don Sanders, a captain of the Delta Queen steamboat and a noted storyteller and author.
- The John Todd House (106 W. 11th Street, c. 1865)

== Notable residents ==
- William E. Ashbrook (1820–1882) – Stockyard owner, city council member, and Kenton County sheriff.
- Laban J. Bradford – Tobacco industry leader and trustee of Kentucky's Agricultural and Mechanical College.
- Henry Farny (1847–1916) – Painter and illustrator; who produced notable works including The Song of the Talking Wire.
- John F. Fisk Sr. – Politician and businessman; represented Kenton County in the state senate, served as acting lieutenant governor, and held local business positions.

== Gallery ==
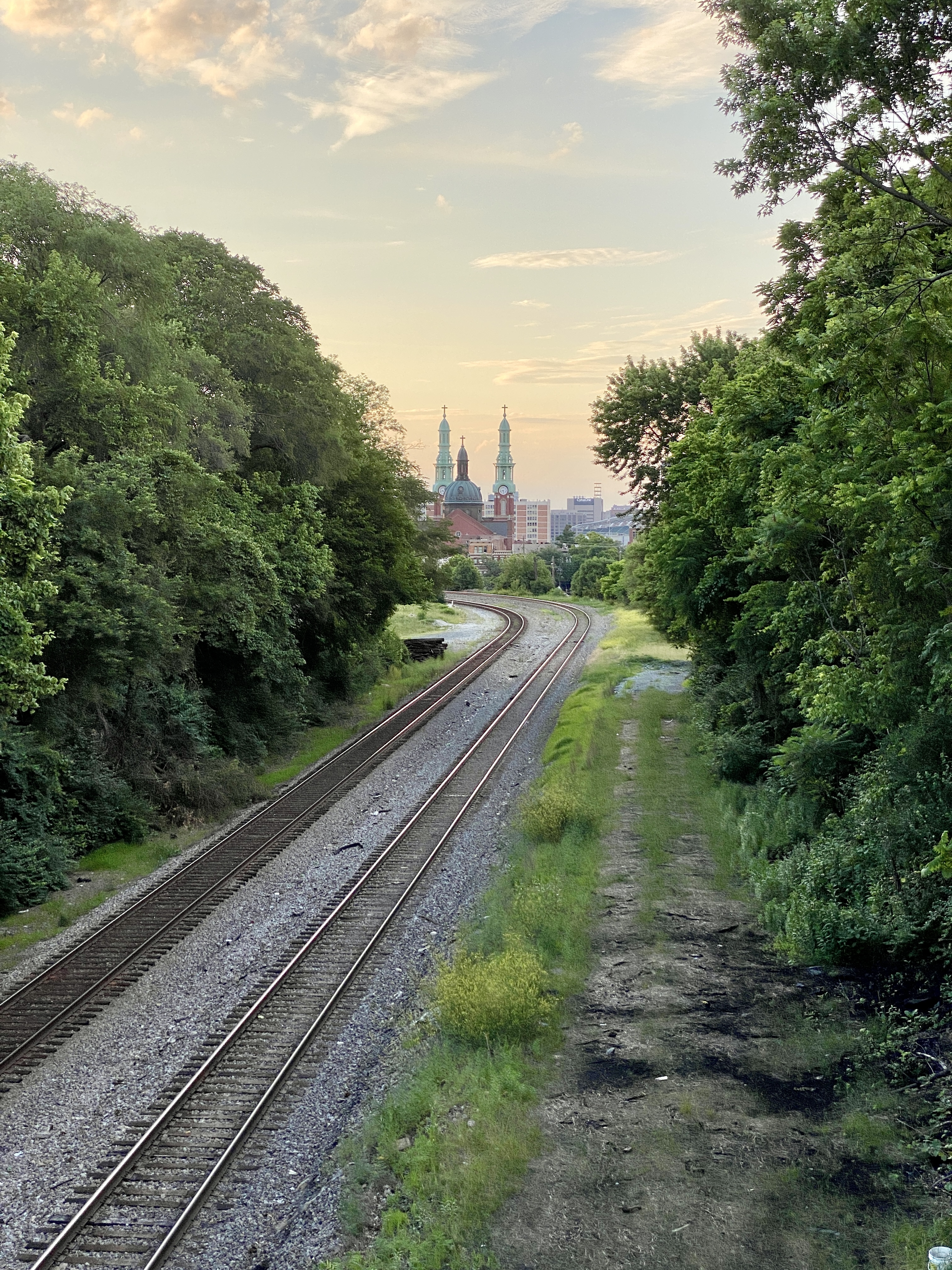
Railroad tracks from 11th Street Pedestrian Bridge, marking the western boundary of the district

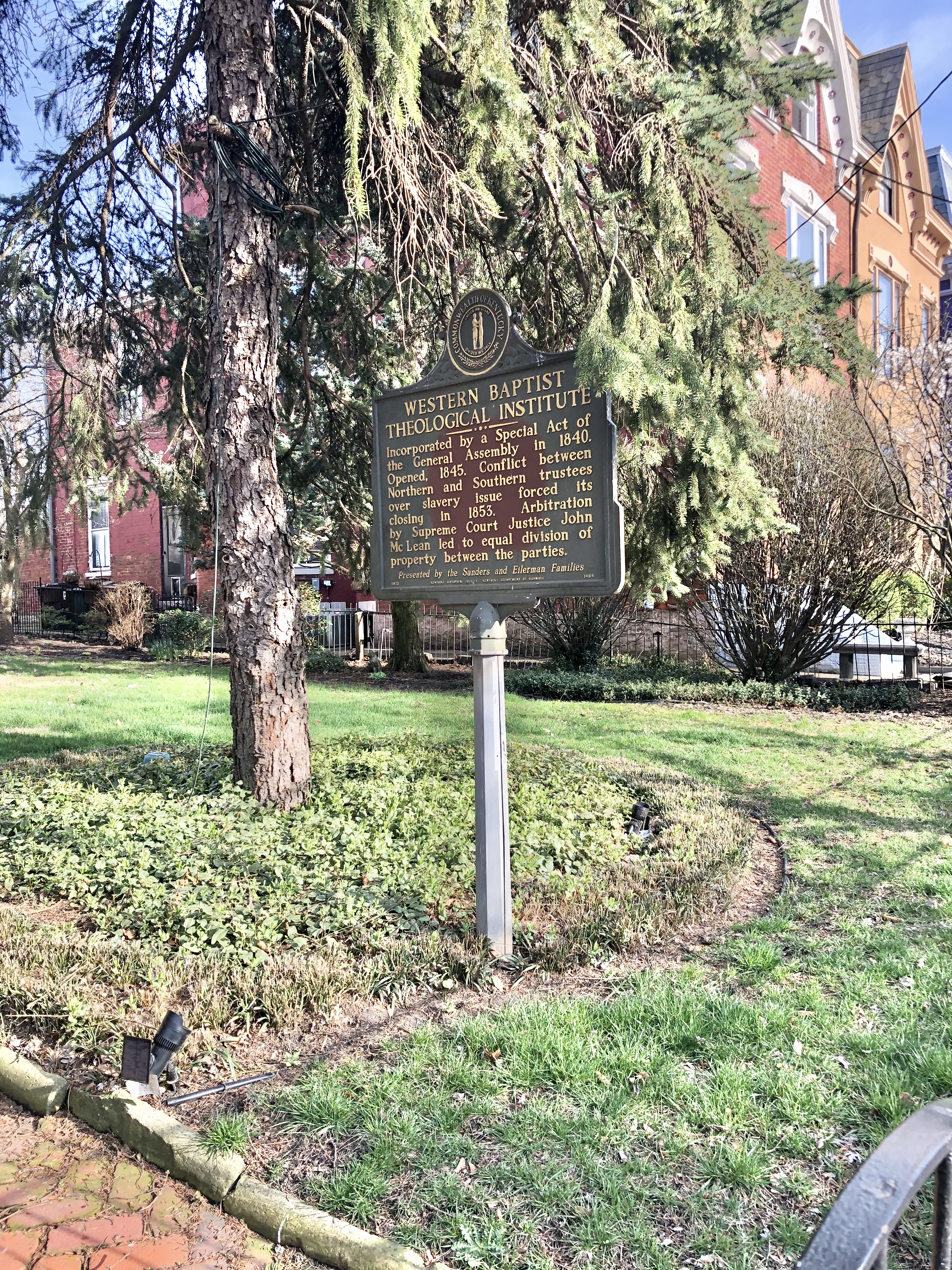
Historical marker for the Western Baptist Theological Seminary at the Sandford House

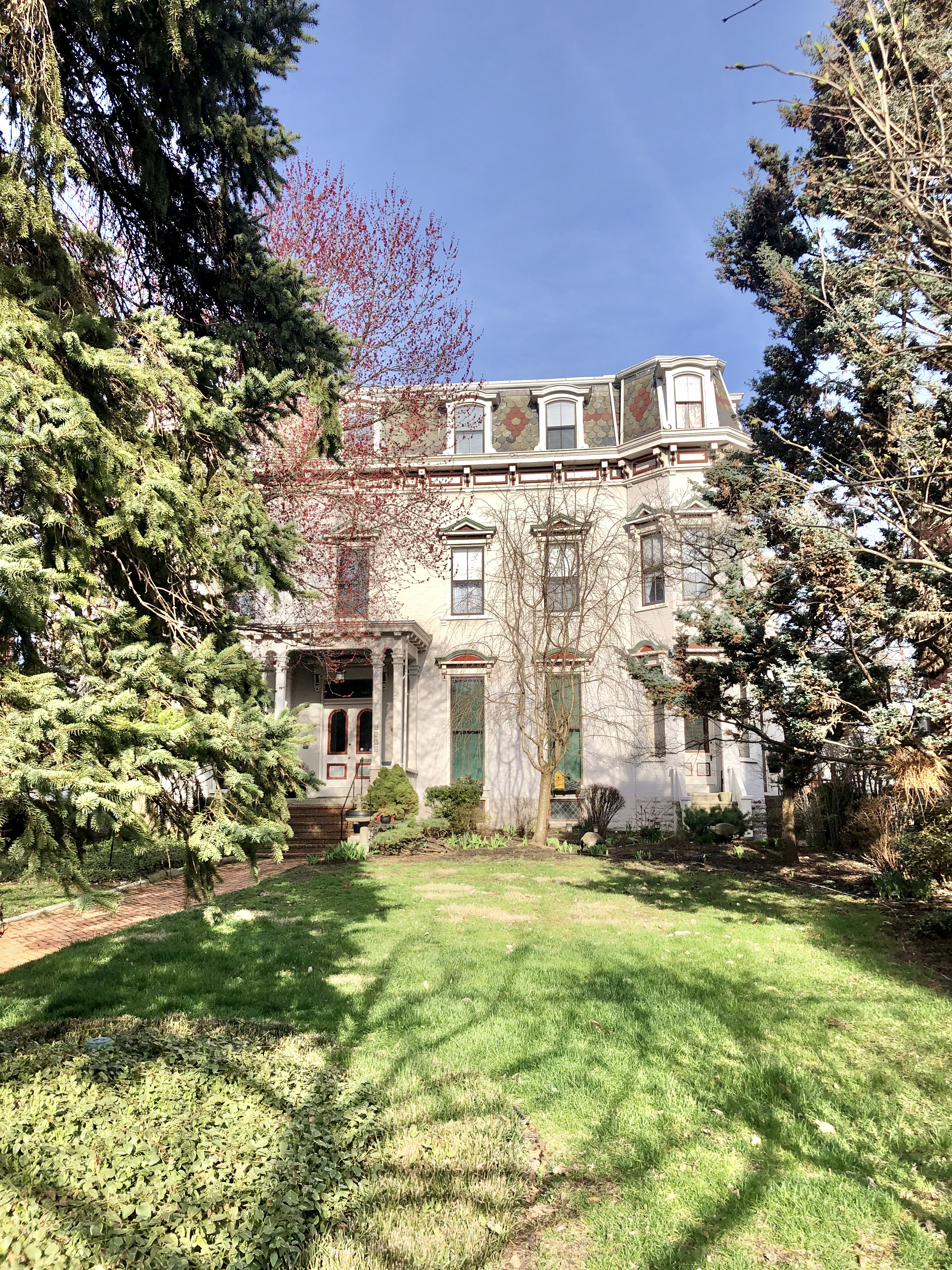
Sanford House, Russell Street

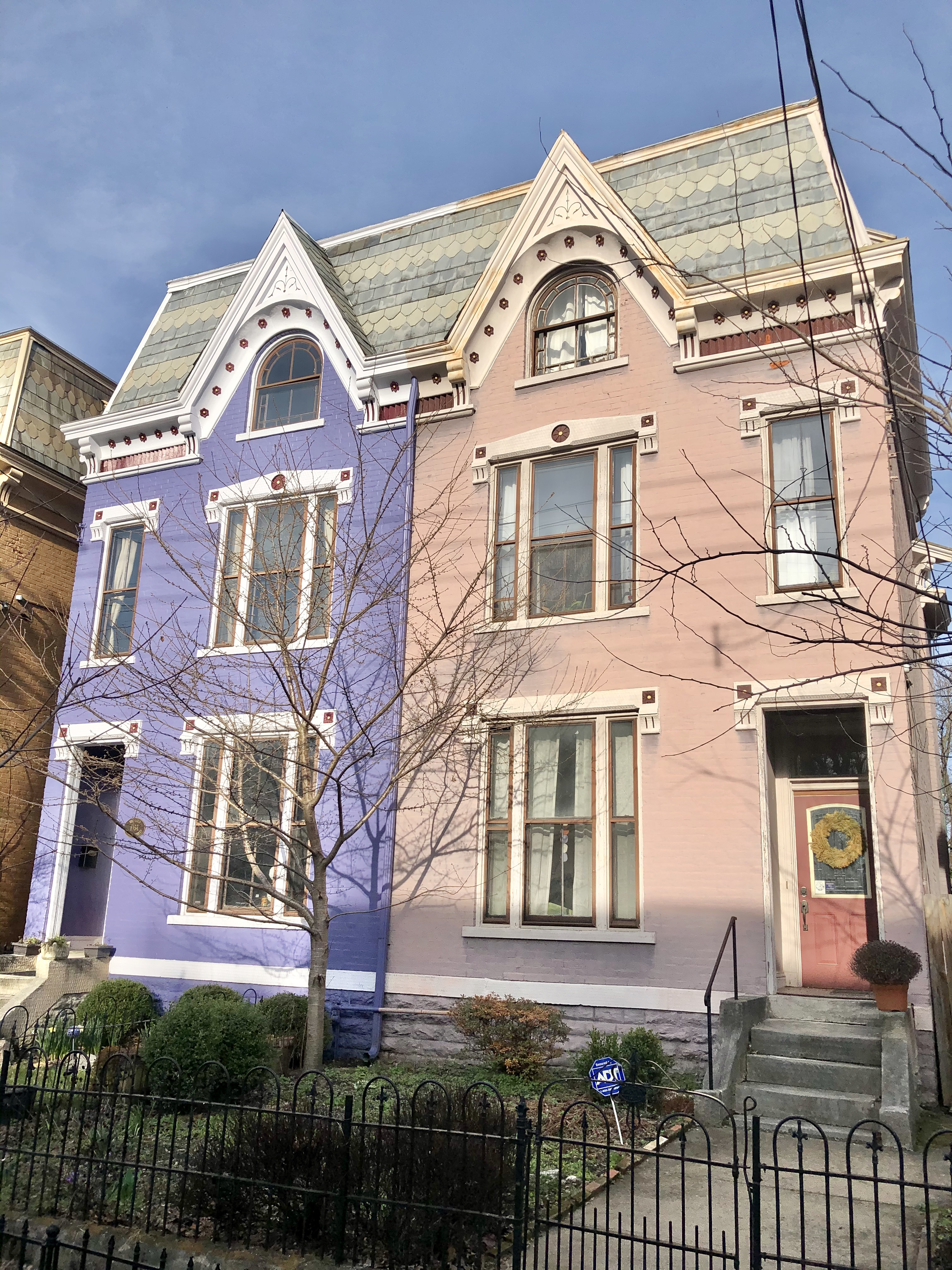
Two Second Empire style houses on Russell Street

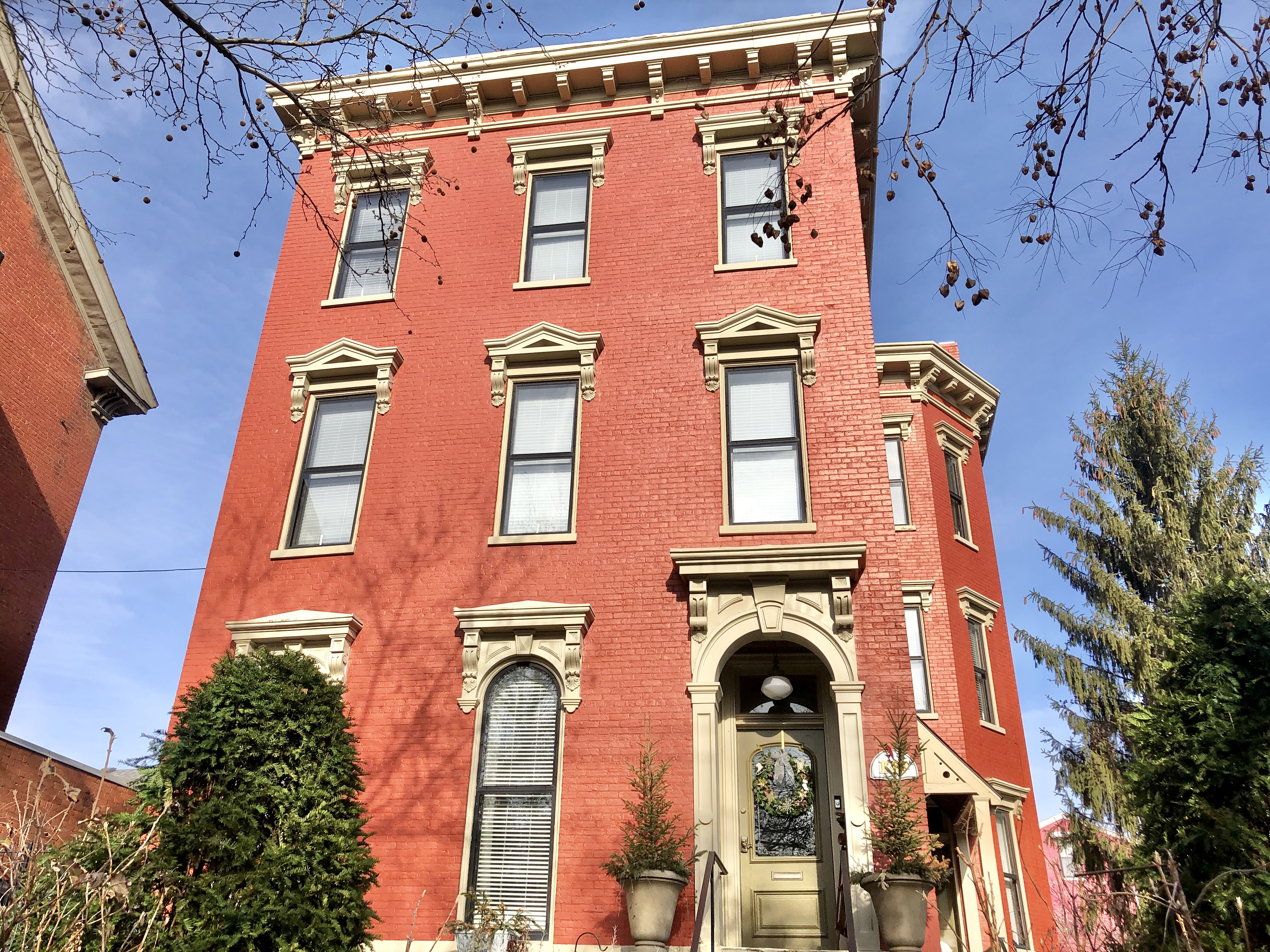
The Ashbrook House, Russell Street

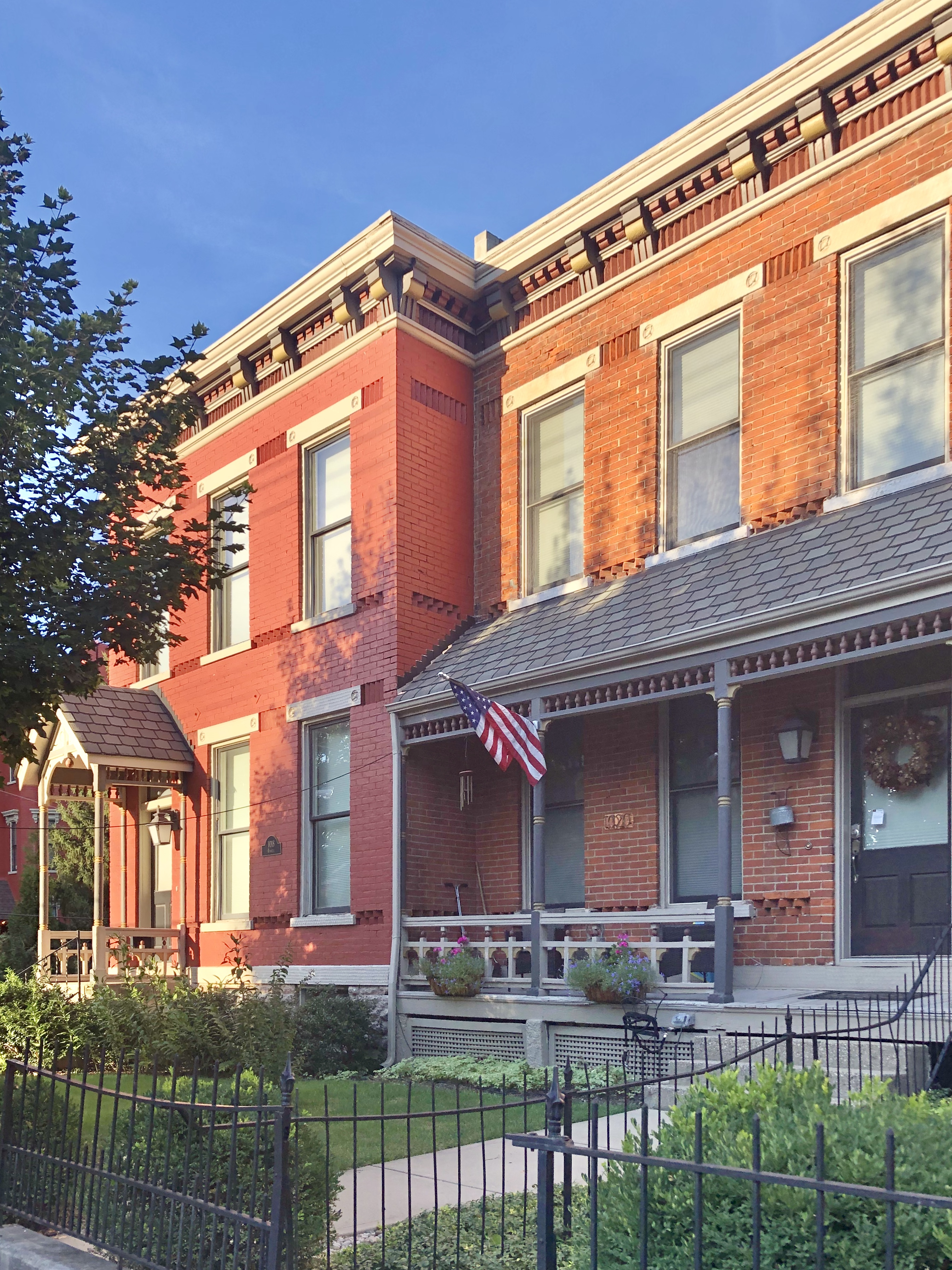
Brick rowhouses on Russell Street

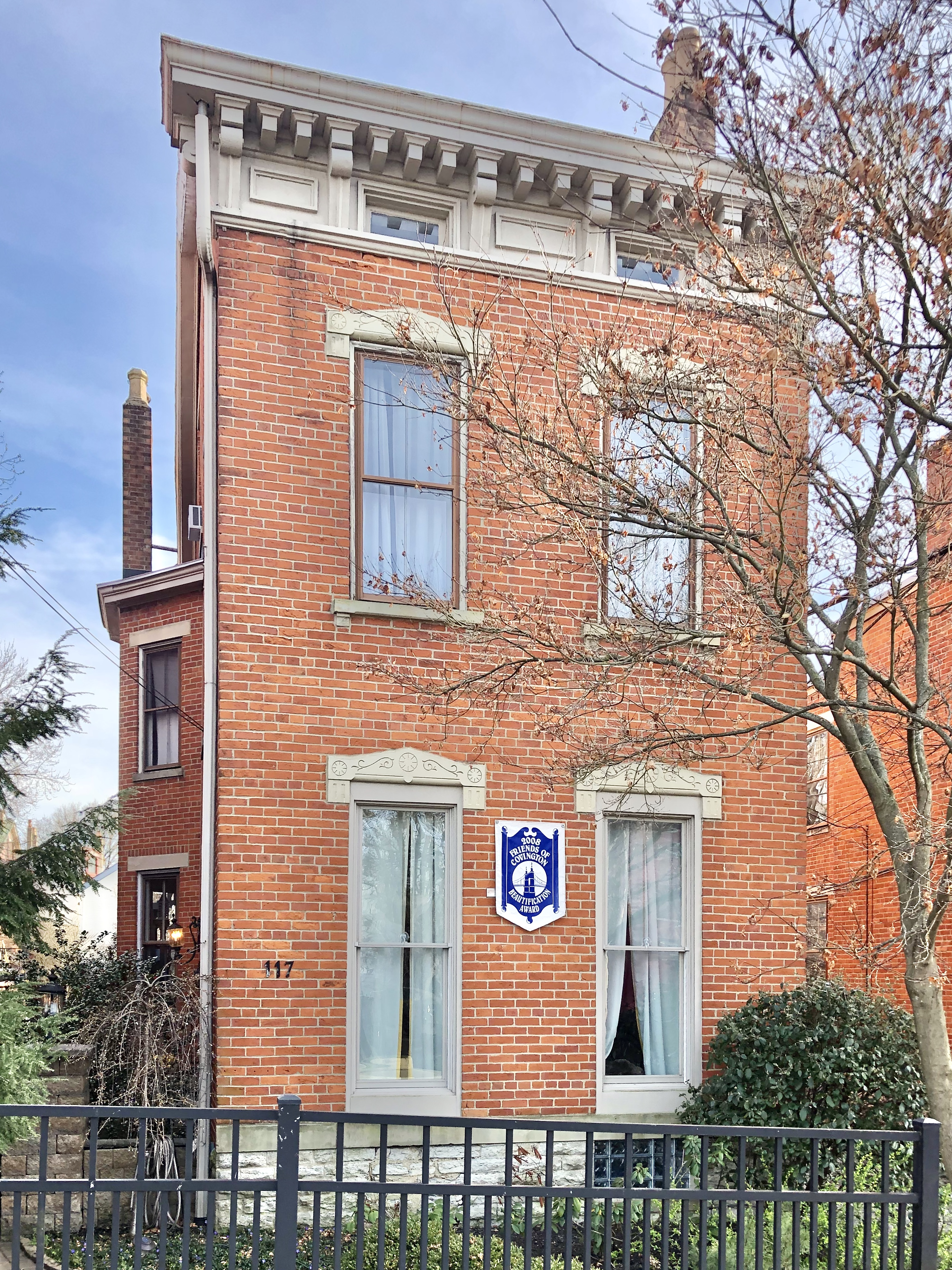
Brick Italianate house on Robbins Street, with a city beautification award displayed on the façade

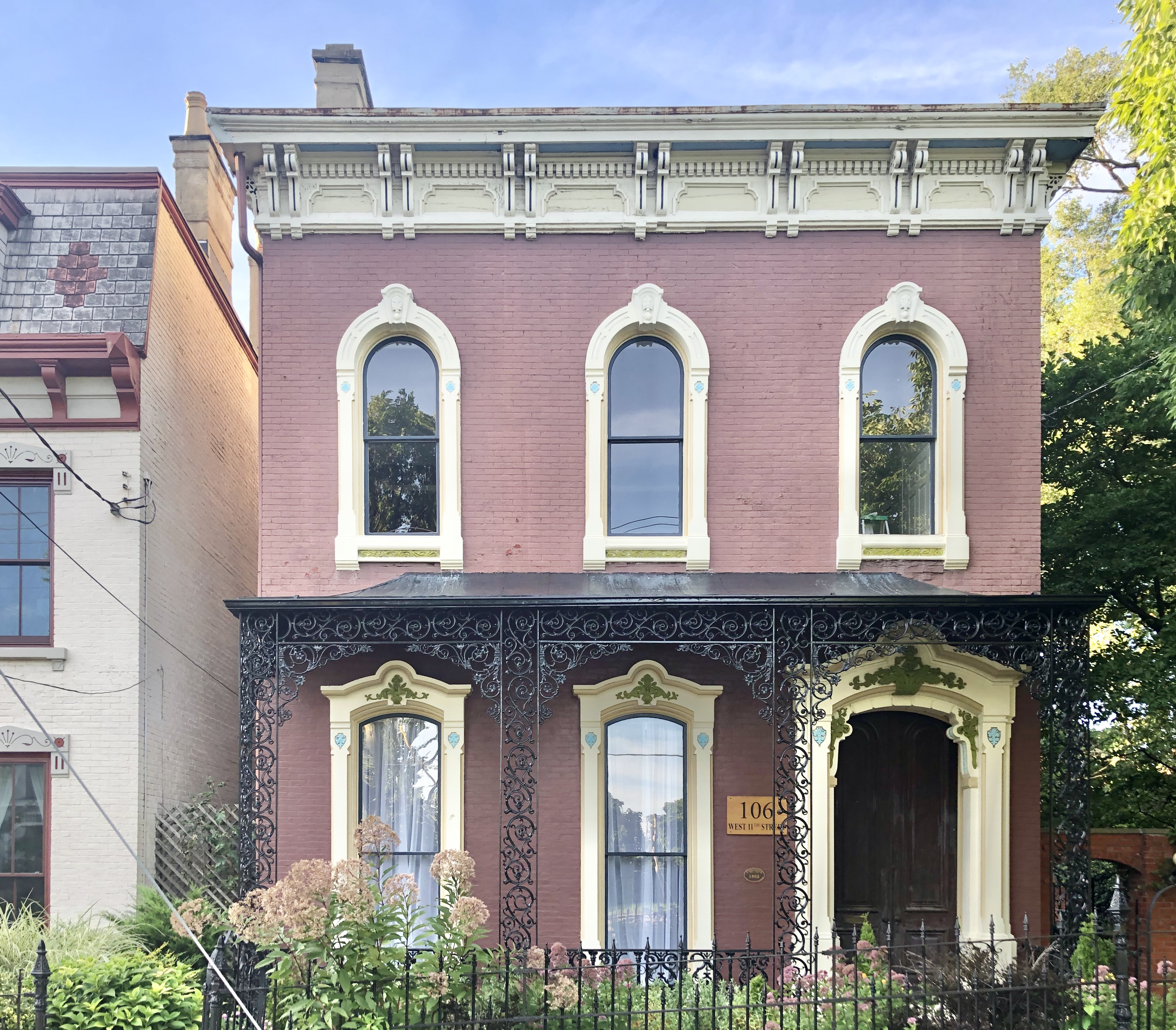
The John Todd House on 11th Street, with extensive ornamental ironwork and iron fencing manufactured by Stewart Iron Works

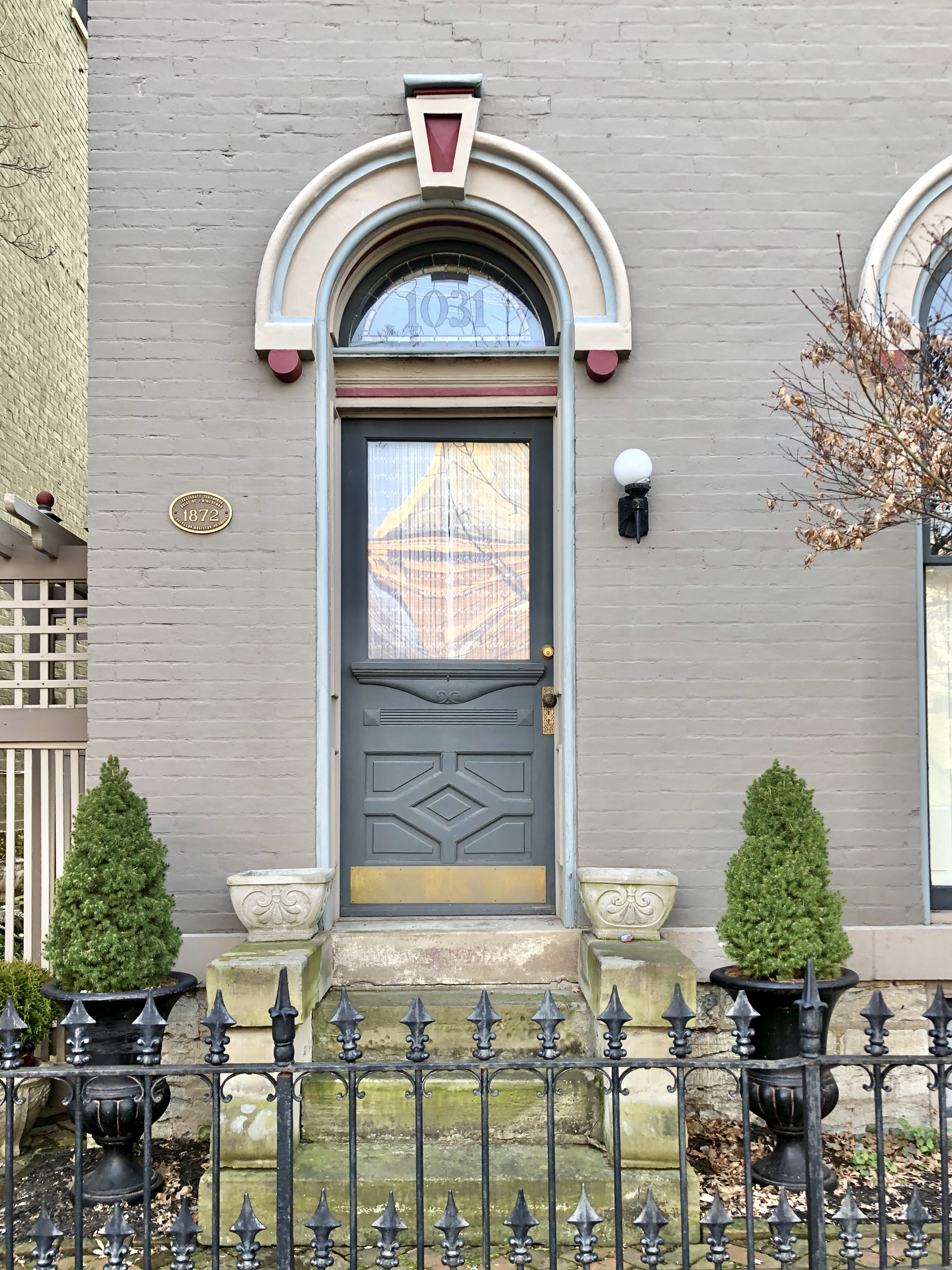
Italianate house on Russell Street with characteristic arched windows and pediments

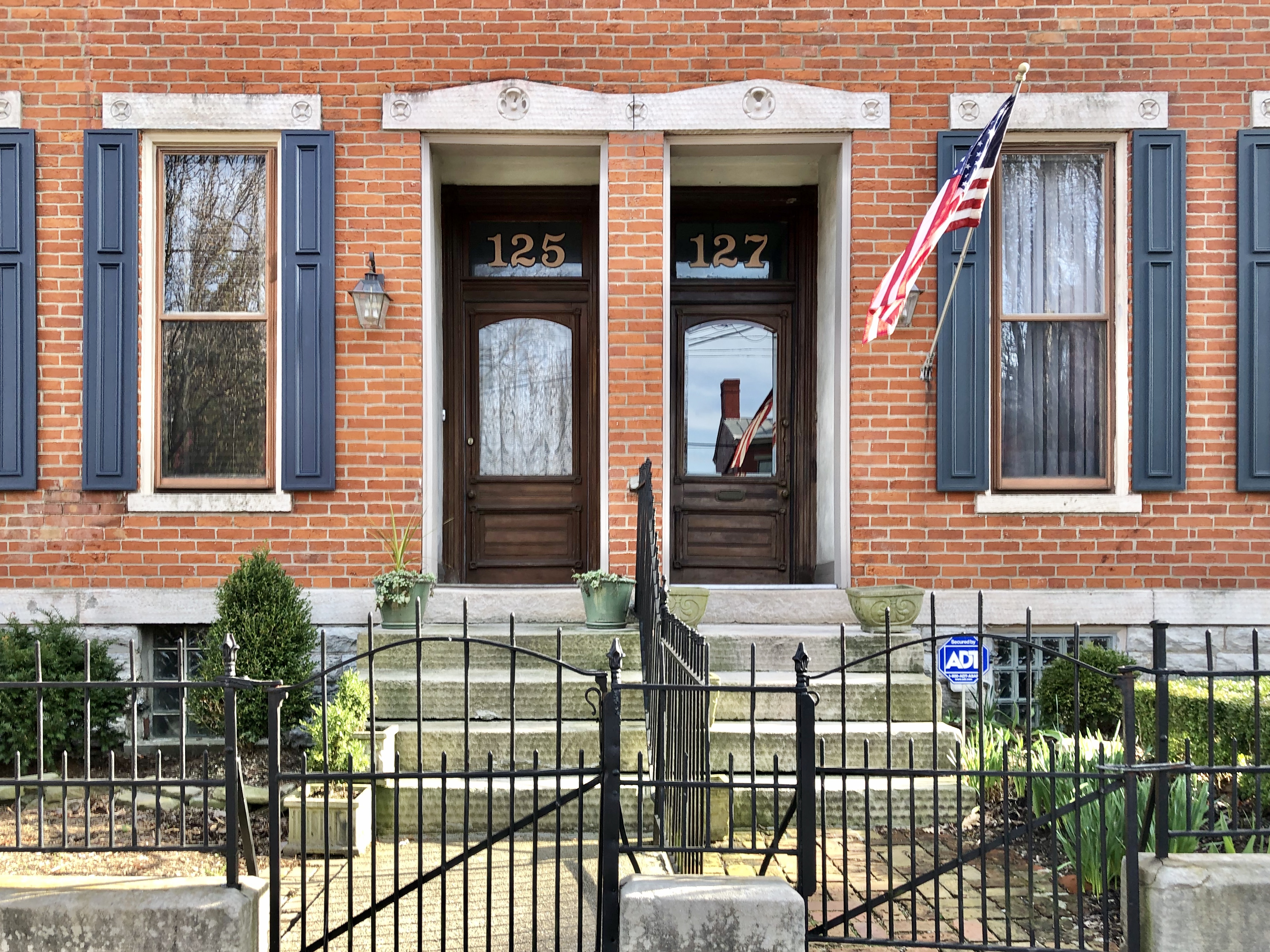
Brick rowhouses on Robbins Street

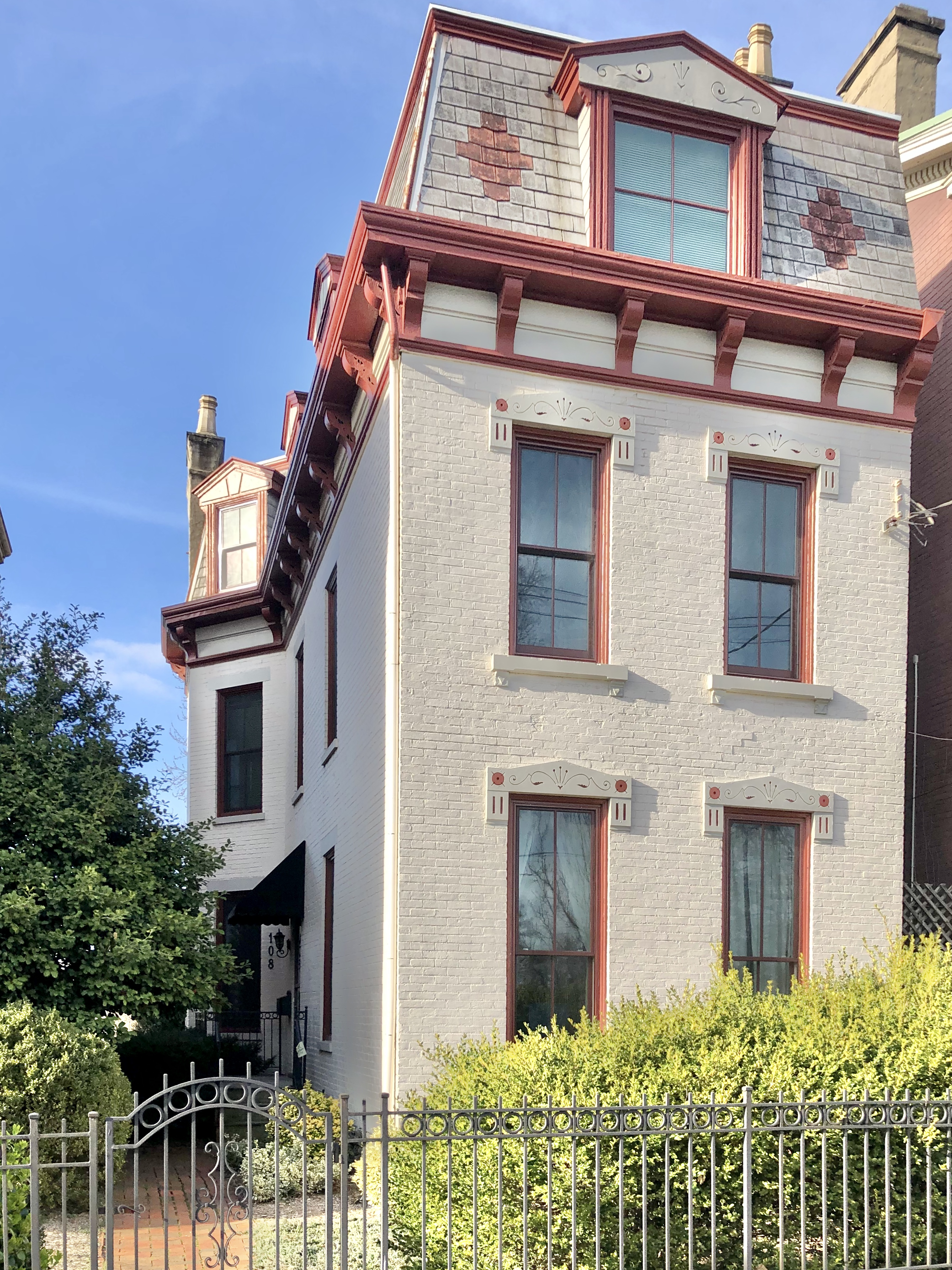
Second Empire house on 11th Street
