= Lewisburg Avenue Historic District =

Historic district in Tennessee, United States

- U.S. National Register of Historic Places
- U.S. Historic district
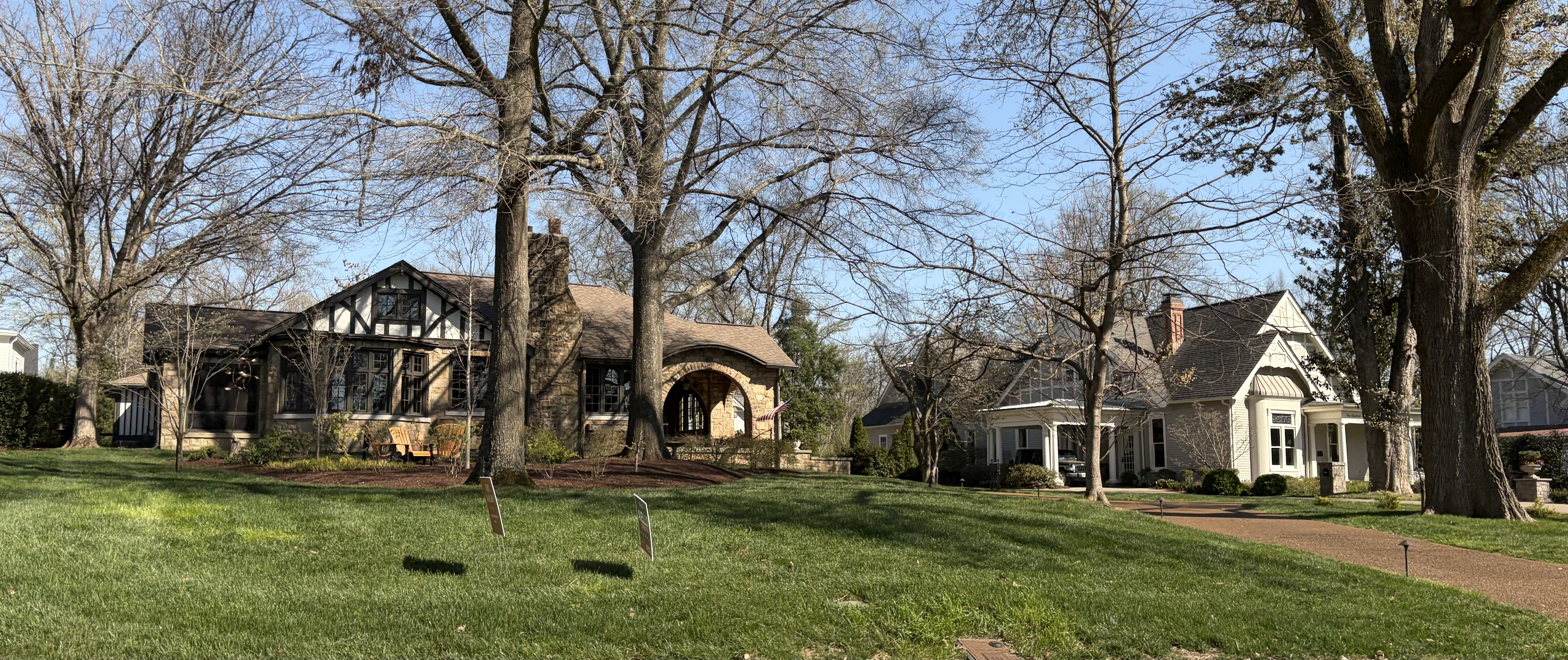
- Houses on Lewisburg Avenue within the district

- Location within Tennessee Location within the United States
- Location: Roughly bounded by S. Margin St., Lewisburg Ave., and Adams St., Franklin, Tennessee
- Coordinates: 35°55′4″N 86°52′10″W
- Area: 28 acres (11 ha)
- Architectural style: Late 19th and 20th Century Revivals, Bungalow/Craftsman, and Late Victorian
- MPS: Williamson County MRA
- NRHP reference No.: 88000312 (original); 100008879 (increase)

Significant dates
- Added to NRHP: April 13, 1988
- Boundary increase: April 20, 2023

Lewisburg Avenue Historic District is a 28-acre (11 ha) historic district in Franklin, Tennessee that was listed on the National Register of Historic Places in 1988 .

It includes Late 19th and 20th Century Revivals, Bungalow/Craftsman, and Late Victorian architecture.

When first listed, the district included 34 contributing buildings and three contributing structures. Also included were six non-contributing buildings, one non-contributing structure,.

The property was covered in a 1988 study of Williamson County historical resources.
