= Bowerman Barn =

- U.S. National Register of Historic Places
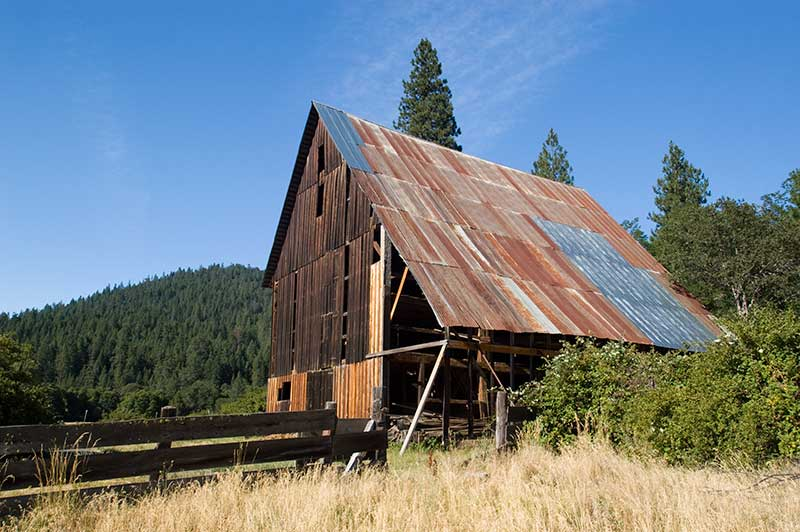

- Location within California Location within the United States
- Nearest city: Trinity Center, California
- Coordinates: 40°54′0″N 122°46′1″W
- Area: 2 acres (0.81 ha)
- Built: 1878
- Built by: Bowerman, Jacob
- NRHP reference No.: 81000181
- Added to NRHP: March 20, 1981

The Bowerman Barn is a historic barn located on Guy Covington Drive southwest of Trinity Center, California. The barn was built in 1878 by Jacob Bowerman, a local cattle rancher. Bowerman built the barn by hand with whipsawn pine wood and board and batten siding, and the barn is a relatively uncommon example of such a hand-crafted design. The barn served as part of Bowerman's ranch, which originally included a ranch house, milk house, and wagon shed, all of which burned down. Bowerman sold beef and dairy products to wholesalers and businesses in Minersville, and his business played a significant role in the development of the regional economy. Bowerman died in 1917, and the barn was subsequently used for sheep farming and storage until the U.S. Forest Service purchased the property in 1974.

The barn was added to the National Register of Historic Places on March 20, 1981.
