= Lewiston Historic District (Lewiston, California) =

Historic district in California, United States

- U.S. National Register of Historic Places
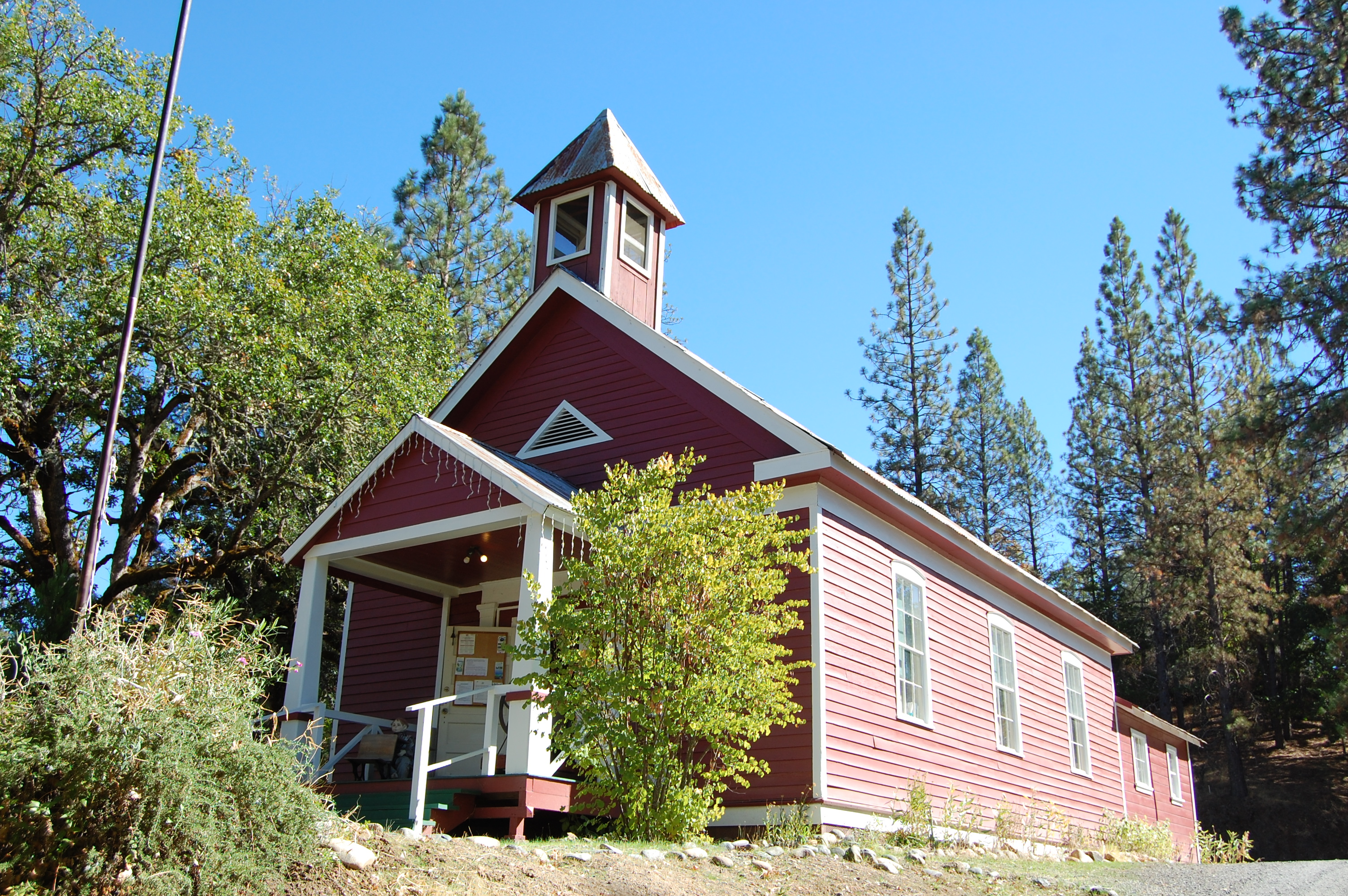

- Location within California
- Location: Roughly Deadwood, Turnpike, and Schoolhouse Rds., Lewiston, California
- Coordinates: 40°42′30″N 122°48′17″W
- Area: 15 acres (6.1 ha)
- Architectural style: Greek Revival
- NRHP reference No.: 88000550
- Added to NRHP: April 17, 1989

The Lewiston Historic District, is a historic district in Lewiston, California. It is 15 acres (6.1 ha) which was listed on the National Register of Historic Places in 1989. The district is roughly bounded by Deadwood, Turnpike, and Schoolhouse Roads.

== History ==
The town of Lewiston was founded in 1853 as a mining and ranching town. It was named after B. F. Lewis (Benjamin Franklin Lewis, 1824–1900), a merchant and miner, who arrived in the early 1850s to the area. The Lewiston post office was opened in 1854, followed by a general store, blacksmith, hotel, butcher shop, and some sort of river crossing (either a ferry or a toll bridge). By 1900, the town had a cemetery. The land was subject to periodic flooding, particularly in winter; until 1957, when they added the Trinity Dam.

The listing included 16 contributing buildings and a contributing structure. It includes Greek Revival architecture.
