= Lewisburg Historic District (Covington, Kentucky) =

Historic district in Kentucky, United States

- U.S. National Register of Historic Places
- U.S. Historic district
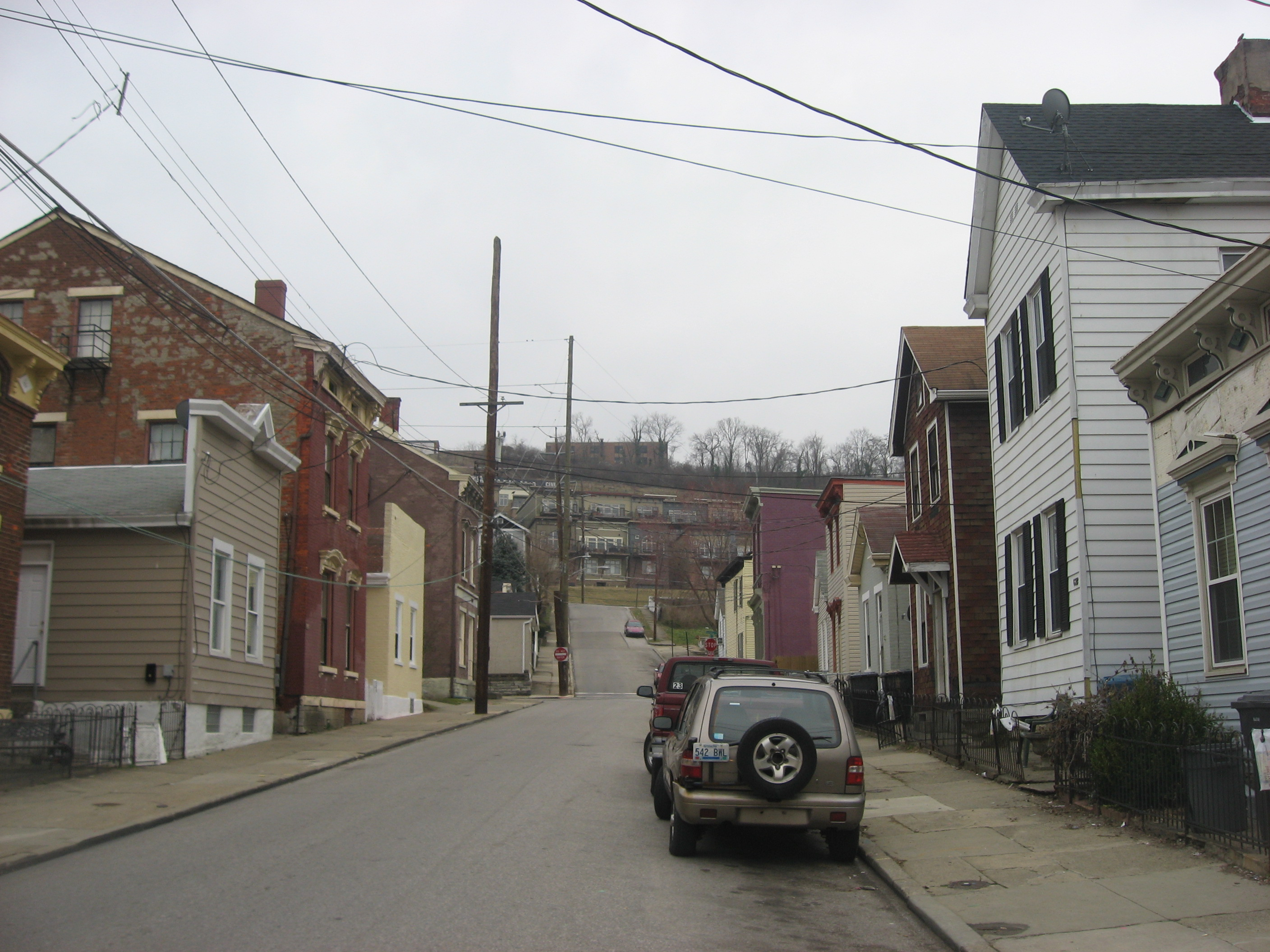
- Scene on Twelfth Street

- Location within Kentucky Location within the United States
- Location: Roughly bounded by I-75 and the Covington city limits, Covington, Kentucky
- Coordinates: 39°4′37″N 84°31′23″W
- Area: 70 acres (28 ha)
- Built: 1842
- Architect: Multiple
- Architectural style: Late 19th and 20th Century Revivals architecture, Late Victorian, Greek Revival
- NRHP reference No.: 93001165
- Added to NRHP: November 5, 1993

Lewisburg Historic District in Covington, Kentucky, United States, is a 70-acre (28 ha) historic district that was listed on the National Register of Historic Places in 1993. At that time, it included 430 buildings deemed to contribute to the historic character of the area, and 46 non-contributing buildings. It is bounded by Interstate 75 on the east and city limits on the southwest and west.
