= 2012 West Liberty tornado =

2012 EF3 tornado across Kentucky and West Virginia, USA

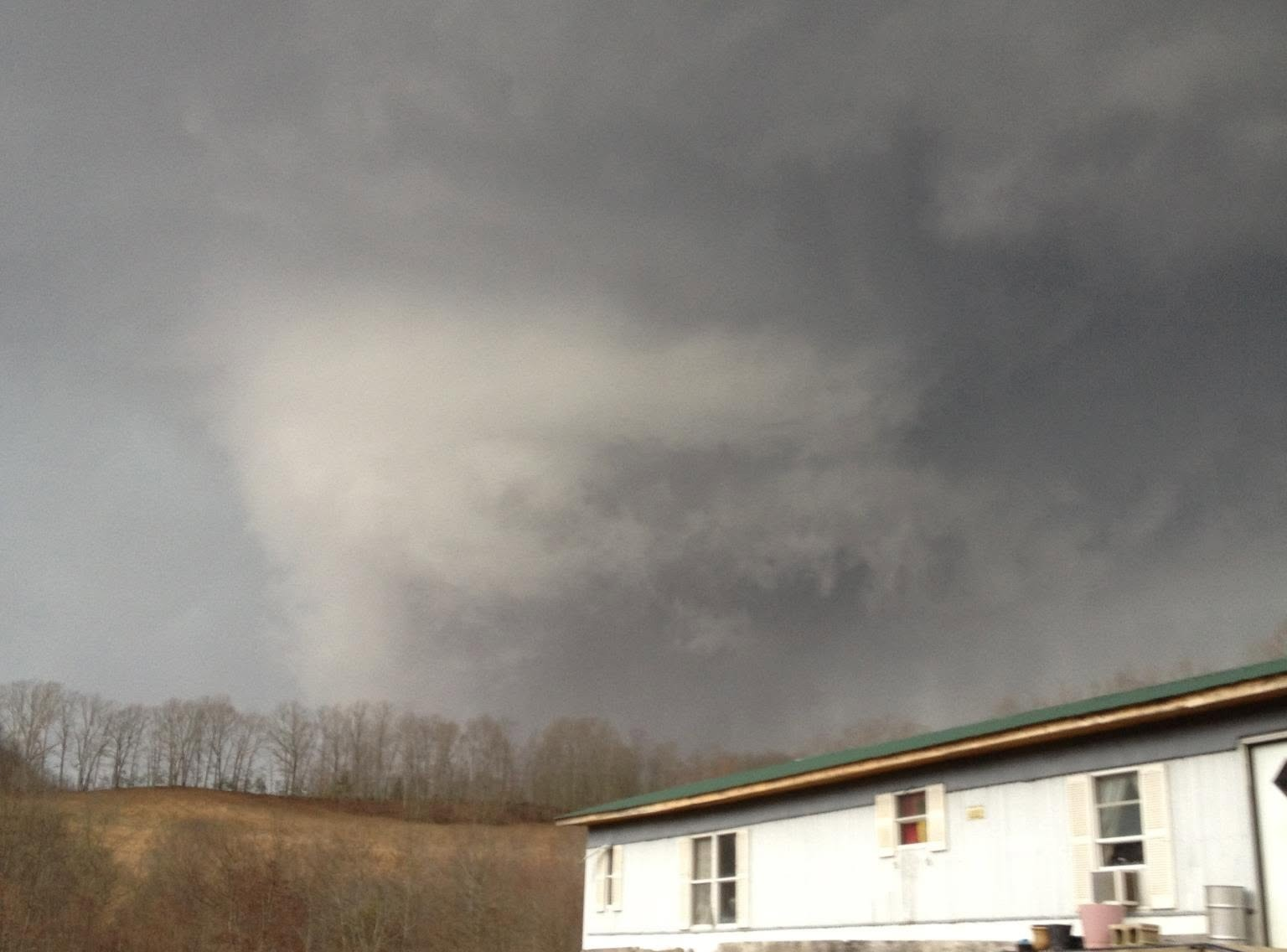
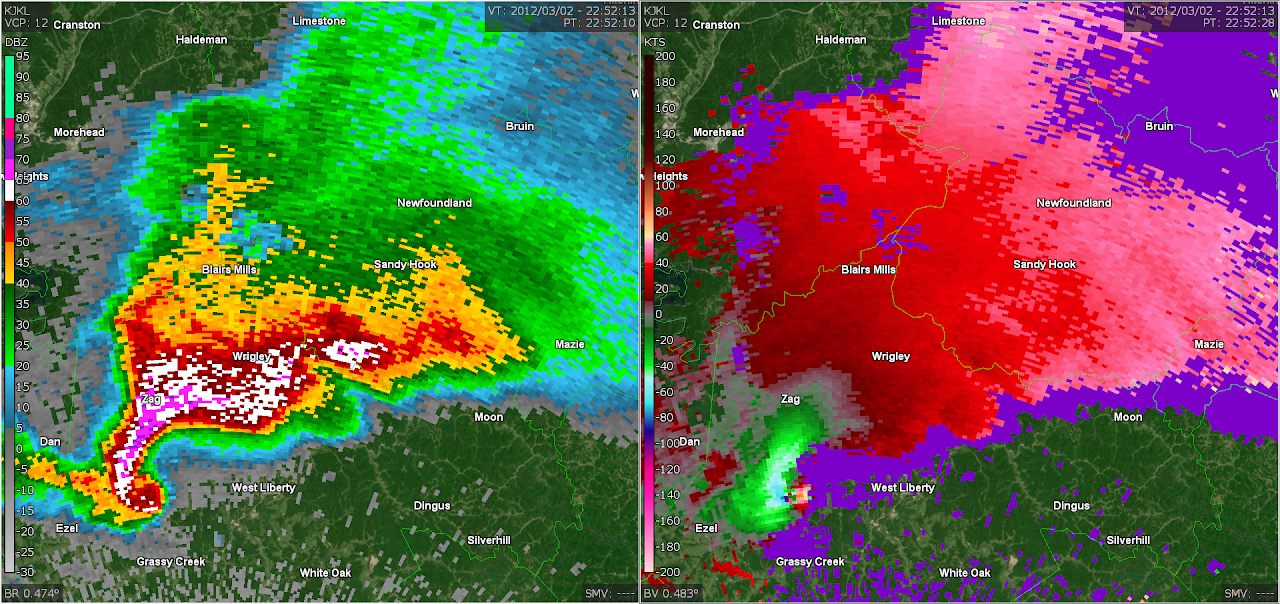
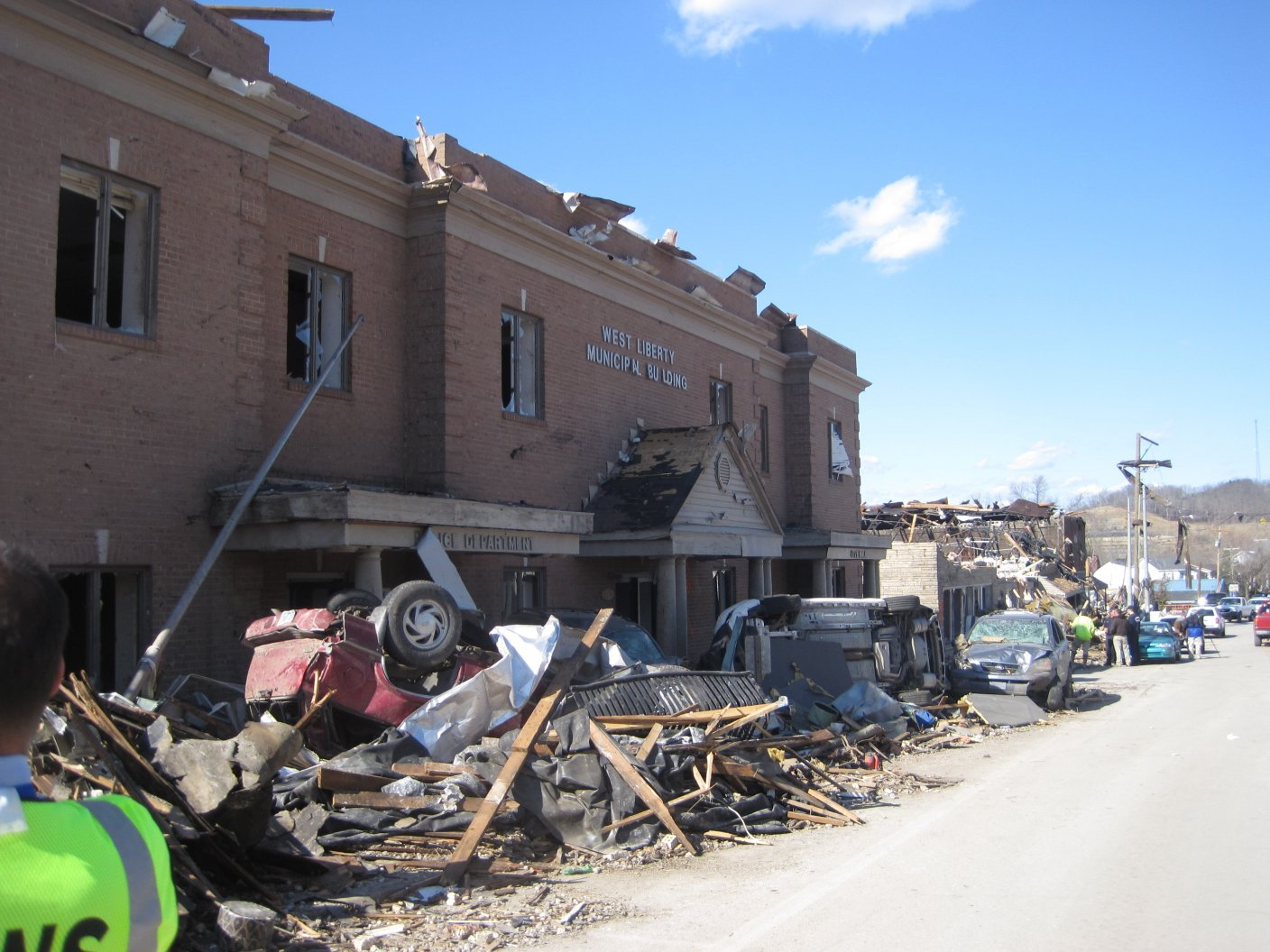
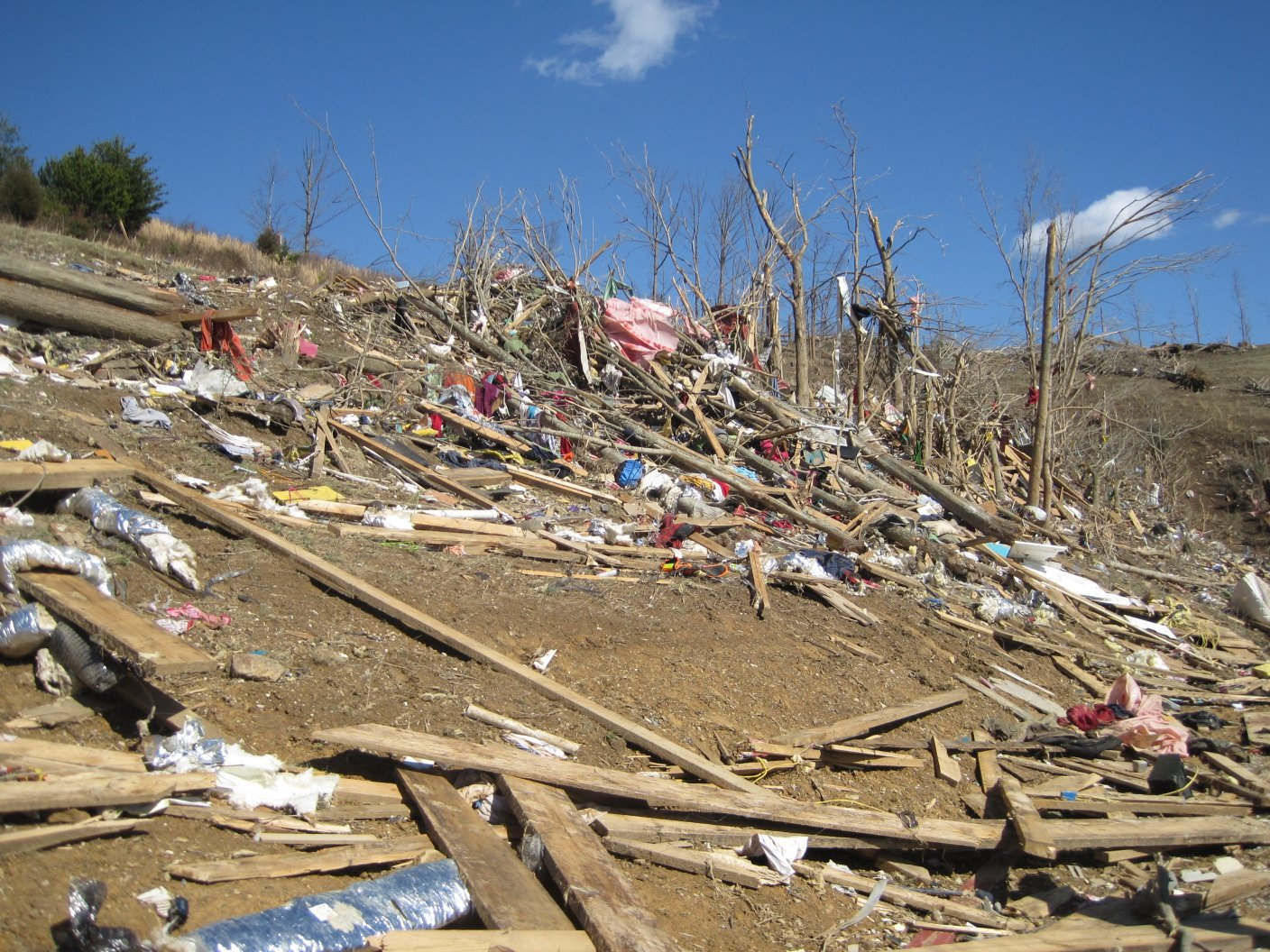
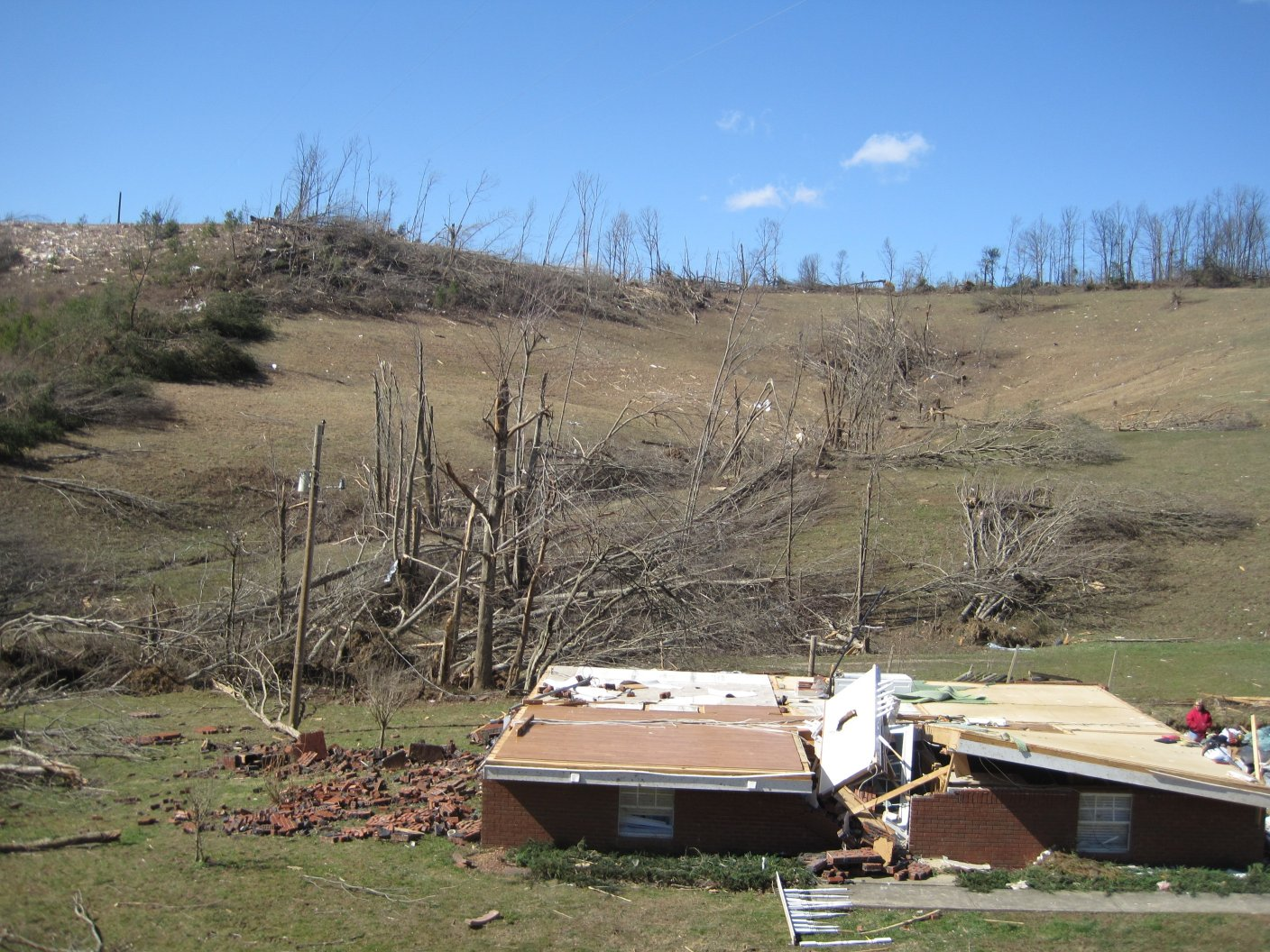
- Clockwise from the top: The EF3 tornado as it was west of West Liberty, Kentucky; severe damage and debris litters downtown West Liberty; EF3 damage to a home along Opossum Hollow Road in Menifee County, Kentucky; debris strewn into a hillside with trees along the aforementioned road; a Next-Generation Radar scan of the EF3 tornado approaching West Liberty

Meteorological history
- Formed: March 2, 2012, 5:39 PM EST (UTC–05:00)
- Dissipated: March 2, 2012, 7:07 PM EST (UTC–05:00)
- Duration: 1 hour, 28 minutes

EF3 tornado
- on the Enhanced Fujita scale
- Max width: 1,580 yd (0.90 mi; 1.44 km)
- Path length: 84.99 mi (136.78 km)
- Highest winds: 140–150 mph (230–240 km/h)

Overall effects
- Fatalities: 10 (+1 indirect)
- Injuries: 118
- Damage: $81.475 million (2012 USD)
- Areas affected: Menifee, Morgan, Lawrence and Johnson Counties, Kentucky to Wayne and Lincoln Counties, West Virginia, United States; specifically near or within Wellington, Ezel, West Liberty, Keaton, Martha and Blaine, Kentucky to Dunlow, Kiahsville and Ranger, West Virginia
- Part of the Tornado outbreak of March 2–3, 2012 and Tornadoes of 2012

On March 2, 2012, a powerful, long-lived and deadly tornado tore across eastern Kentucky and western West Virginia in the eastern United States, through the Cumberland and Allegheny Plateau regions of the western Appalachian Mountains. It was one of several tornadoes rated EF3 on the Enhanced Fujita scale during a large and deadly tornado outbreak across the Ohio River Valley. During the event, the very long-track tornado (Note: Very long-track is defined as traversing 60–90 miles (97–145 km) or more.) covered the longest distance of any tornado during the outbreak, and subsequently of the entire 2012 season. The storm tracked through portions of Menifee, Morgan, Lawrence, and Johnson Counties in Kentucky, to Wayne and Lincoln Counties in West Virginia. Along its path, the tornado most notably impacted the city of West Liberty, Kentucky, in central Morgan County.

The 2012 West Liberty tornado, was among the few, especially strong tornadoes to track across mountainous regions, debunking the myth that tornadoes do not track over such geography. It was also the first time an intense (F3/EF3+) tornado struck the regional county warning area of the National Weather Service in Jackson, Kentucky, with the last such tornado occurring back in 1988 where the city of Middlesboro, Kentucky, was hit. 10 people were killed by the tornado, (Note: One indirect fatality was attributed, making the total death toll to 11 killed.) with 118 others injured across six different counties in Kentucky and West Virginia, causing approximately $81,475,000 (2012 USD) in total damages. The tornado tracked a path length of 84.99 mi (136.78 km) long and 1,580 yd (0.90 mi; 1.44 km) wide at its largest in Morgan County, Kentucky, along its 88-minute lifespan.

== Meteorological synoptics ==
=== Episode narrative ===
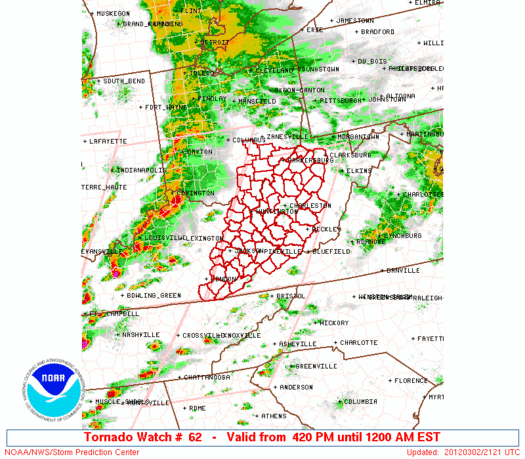
A Particularly Dangerous Situation tornado watch for mainly eastern Kentucky and western West Virginia on March 2

One day prior on March 1, 2012, at approximately 12:30 PM EST (17:30 UTC), the NOAA Storm Prediction Center (SPC) issued a large, 45% hatched and level 4/5 moderate risk area for severe weather across the eastern United States. This large risk spanned across northern Mississippi and Alabama, into central Tennessee and Kentucky, towards southern Indiana and Ohio the following day on the 2nd. A very large mid- and upper level trough was stationed in northern Arkansas and southern Missouri, towards the Columbus, Ohio area. The trough moved slowly eastward from its position in the Ozark Mountains, transporting a belt of fast southwesterly winds to the southeastern side of the storm system. This overlapped with a highly sheared region, resulting in a possibility of tornadic supercells forming and tornadoes in general, some strong per the SPC.

SPC outlooks on March 2, 2012.

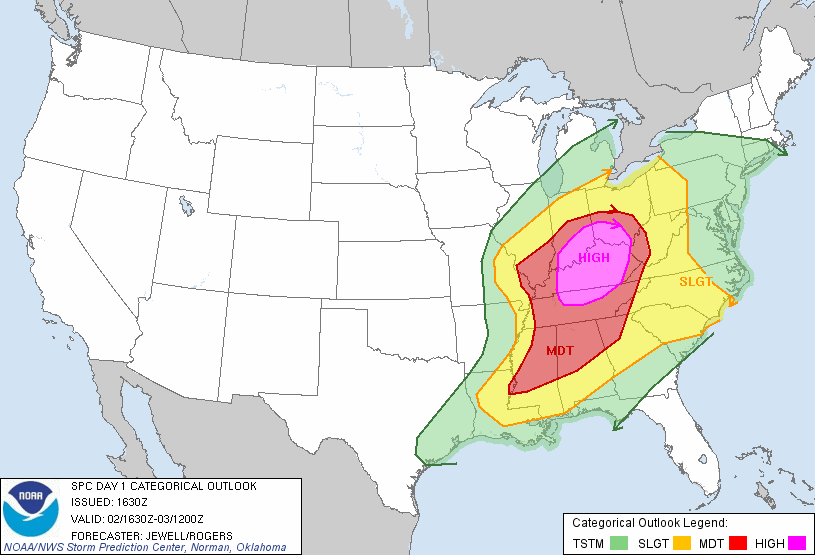
Day 1 1630z categorical outlooks

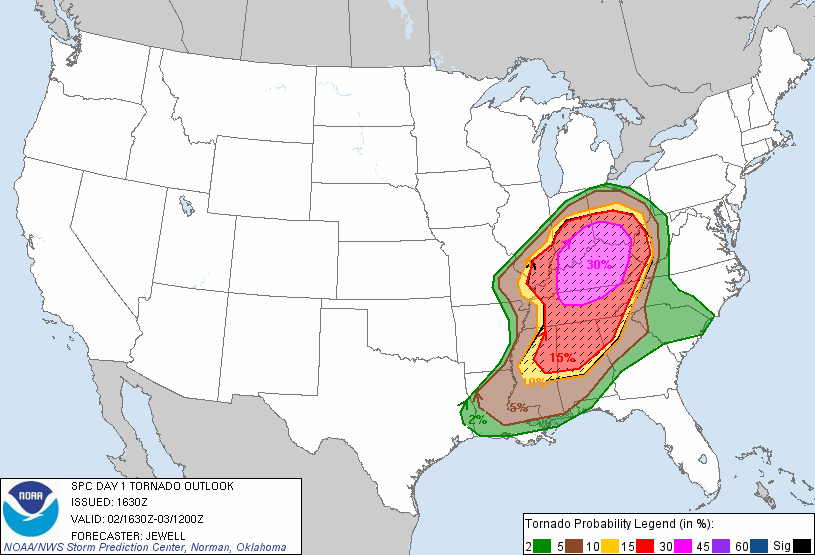
Day 1 1630z tornado outlooks

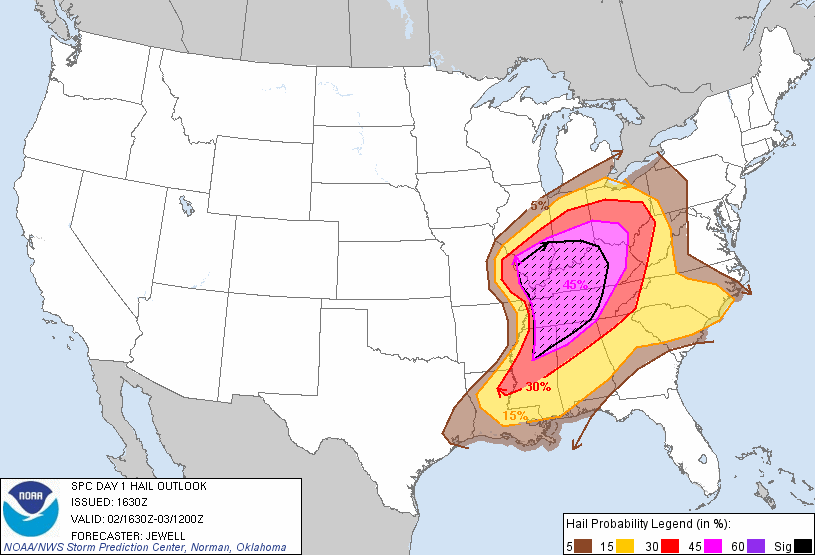
Day 1 1630z hail outlooks

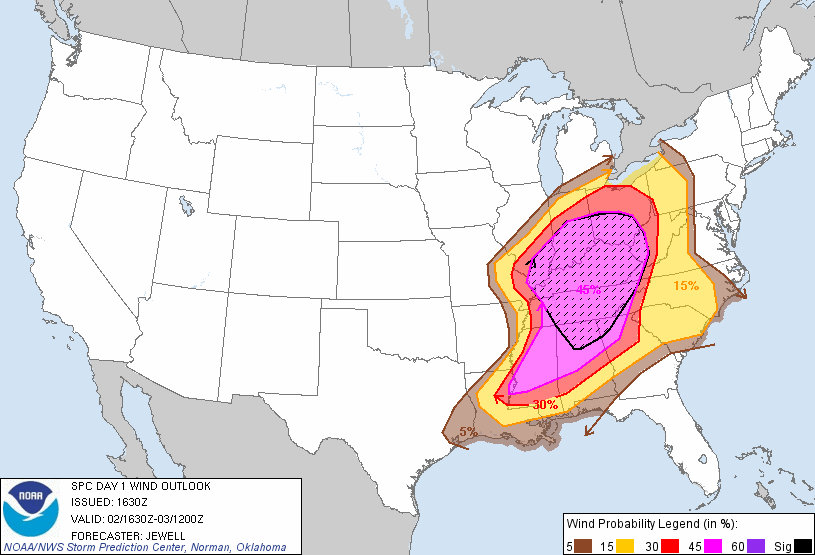
Day 1 1630z wind outlooks

The following day on March 2 at around 8:00 PM EST (13:00 UTC), the SPC issued a Public Severe Weather Outlook (PWO), concerning a more hazardous risk for significant (EF2+) tornadoes than what was expected the day prior. A level 5/5 high risk, which corresponded to a 30% hatched tornado risk, was put in place over central Kentucky and north-central Tennessee. The moderate risk area widened to include portions of southeastern Illinois, northwestern Georgia and the western Virginias. Alongside the main tornado risk, 45% hatched hail and damaging wind risks were issued over parts of the Ohio and Tennessee River Valleys. At 11:30 PM EST (16:30 UTC), the SPC adjusted the outlooks to include southern Indiana and Ohio in the high risk. At the same time, the moderate risk extended more westward, with most of northern Mississippi encompassed by it but also a small portion in eastern Missouri. The 45% hatched wind risk extended south to northern Alabama and Georgia, where as the 45% hatched hail risk moved westward, with northern Mississippi included. The strong upper-level trough with a vorticity center moved from northern Missouri to the Ohio River Valley area. Strong wind shear with the trough created a large and expanding unstable air mass, (Note: Also known as a warm sector.) which then overlapped a massive region across parts of the river valley and southern states, conducive for a widespread and potentially destructive tornado outbreak.

=== Event narrative ===
On the morning of March 2, 2012, around 10:30 AM EST (15:30 UTC), a tornado watch was issued by the National Weather Service across east-central Tennessee, northern Alabama and northwestern Georgia. An initial squall line that formed along the Kansas–Missouri border moved eastward across the state and towards the Tennessee/Ohio River Valley area. Some of these storms within the line showed signs of rotation. These morning storms, including one that was responsible for a damaging EF3 tornado that impacted the northern Huntsville, Alabama metropolitan area, were associated with an incoming warm front that was linked to a low pressure area, located north at the Great Lakes. After many strong tornadoes occurred throughout the warm sector, the latest and final PDS tornado watch was issued at approximately 4:20 PM EST (21:20 UTC) that covered parts of Kentucky, Ohio, West Virginia and Virginia. Many of these supercells that had a history of producing destructive tornadoes, moved towards the Appalachian Mountains later into the evening. High vertical wind shear values were present within the warm sector of the expanding extratropical cyclone, giving way for storms to produce strong tornadoes. One of these supercells at this time would be responsible for the EF3 tornado that struck West Liberty, Kentucky soon after.

== Tornado summary ==
=== Beginning phases ===
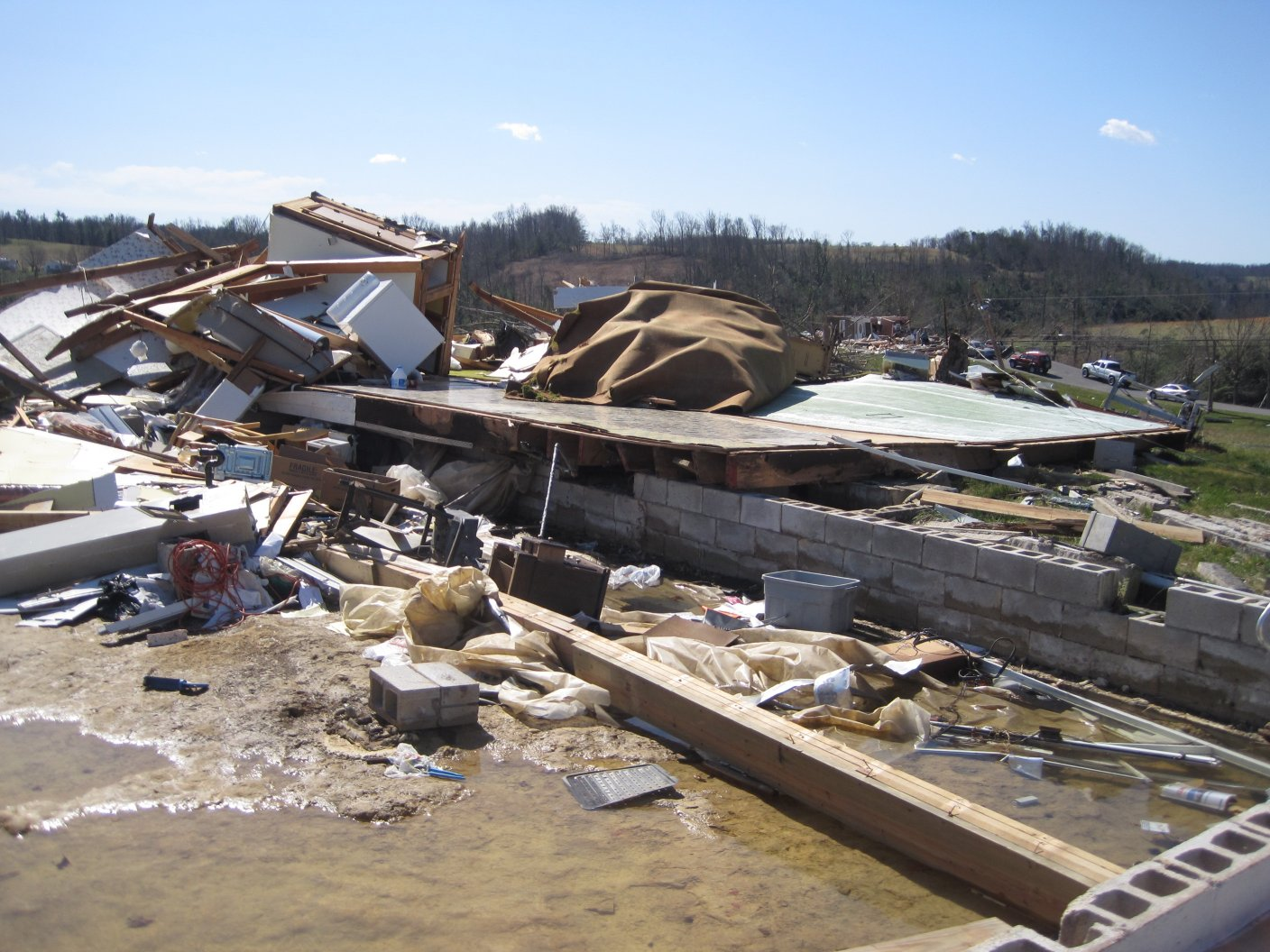
A leveled home along Trimble Bend Road near Denniston, Kentucky

At 5:39 PM EST (22:39 UTC) the tornado touched down along Tarr Ridge, approximately 2.15 mi (3.46 km) southwest of Mariba or due south of Frenchburg, in south-central Menifee County, Kentucky. Along KY 77, the tornado impacted a few residences it encroached over, causing extensive amounts of damage to some. It continued eastwards after causing destruction to some homes along Trimble Bend Road, as it was passing south of Denniston before then approaching areas south of Wellington. South-southwest of the community along Opossum Hollow Road, the tornado struck several residences, with one home being nearly completely destroyed, leaving only the basement remaining. After crossing over US 460, the tornado exited Menifee County where it killed two people. An additional but indirect fatality occurred as one person fell to their death off a staircase during clean-up efforts in the area. Approximately $2,000,000 (2012 USD) in damages were inflicted within Menifee County. (Note: See [1] "Event Details for Menifee County, Kentucky (EF3 Tornado)")

=== Impact on West Liberty ===
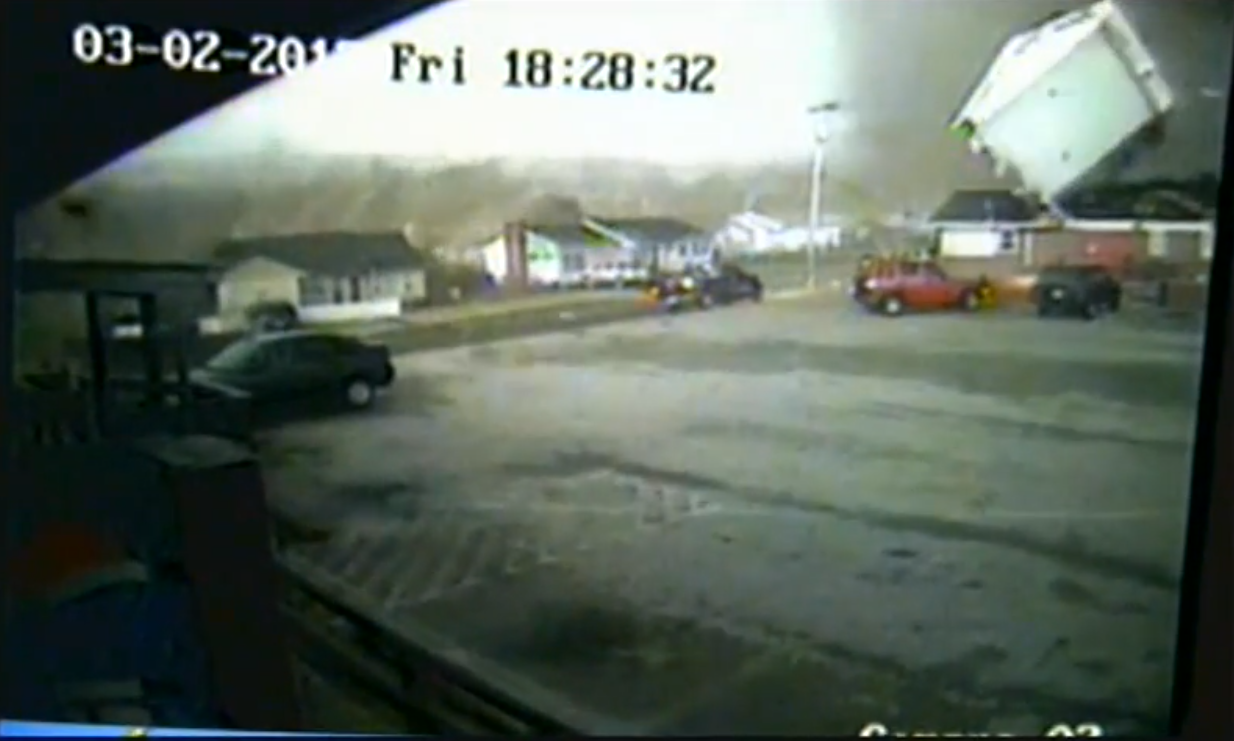
CCTV still of the tornado as it was going into West Liberty

Prior to the tornado's formation, at 5:38 PM EST (22:38 UTC), a tornado warning was issued by the National Weather Service office in Jackson for parts of Morgan, Magoffin, Johnson, Floyd, Breathitt, Lee and Wolfe Counties. The tornado then entered western Morgan County, northwest of Ezel at 5:46 PM EST (22:46 UTC). Spending the following 12 minutes traversing across the hilly terrain, the storm impacted or passed by homes before making a hit on West Liberty at 5:58 PM EST (22:58 UTC). Entering into the city through Dixie Lane, the tornado would level several buildings located along KY 7 and Prestonsburg Street at EF3 intensity, such as the 105-year old courthouse that was built back in 1907. The 100-year old West Liberty United Methodist and Christian churches in the downtown area were destroyed as well. A Great Depression-era Works Progress Administration community center was demolished as the tornado tracked through the city. Much of the downtown area was left littered with debris of buildings, as the tornado continued paralleling Prestonsburg Street eastward. (Note: See [1] "Event Details for Morgan County, Kentucky (EF3 Tornado)")

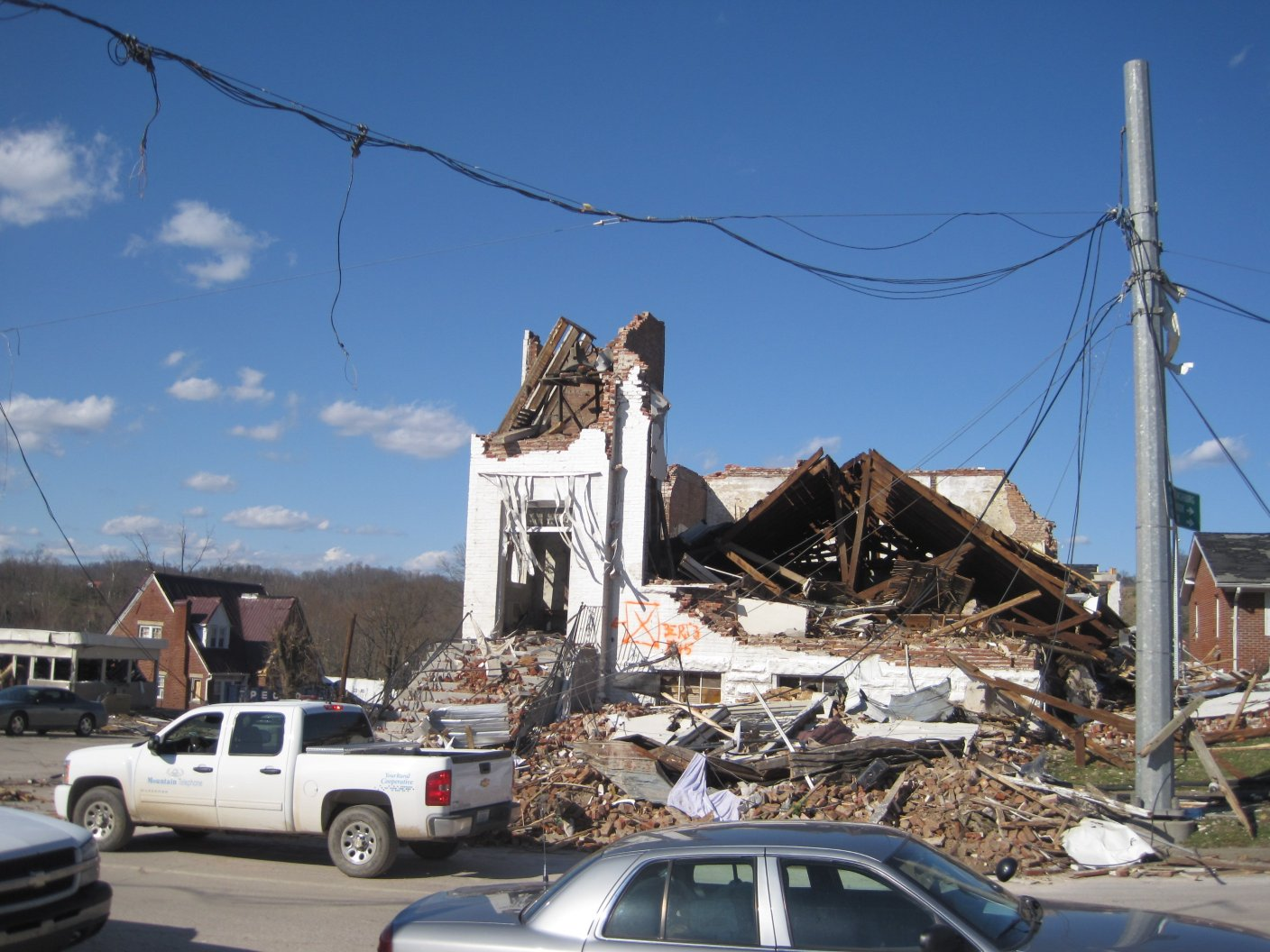
The United Methodist Church heavily destroyed by the tornado

After leaving West Liberty to the northeast, the tornado impacted a few rural residences, causing extensive damage to them. At the same time, the tornado downed thousands of trees around the area east of West Liberty. Within Morgan County, the tornado had estimated winds of 140 mph (230 km/h), and grew to its maximum width of 1,580 yd (0.90 mi; 1.44 km), and caused $75,000,000 (2012 USD) in damages throughout the county, the most out of six counties impacted.

=== Rural track through Appalachia ===
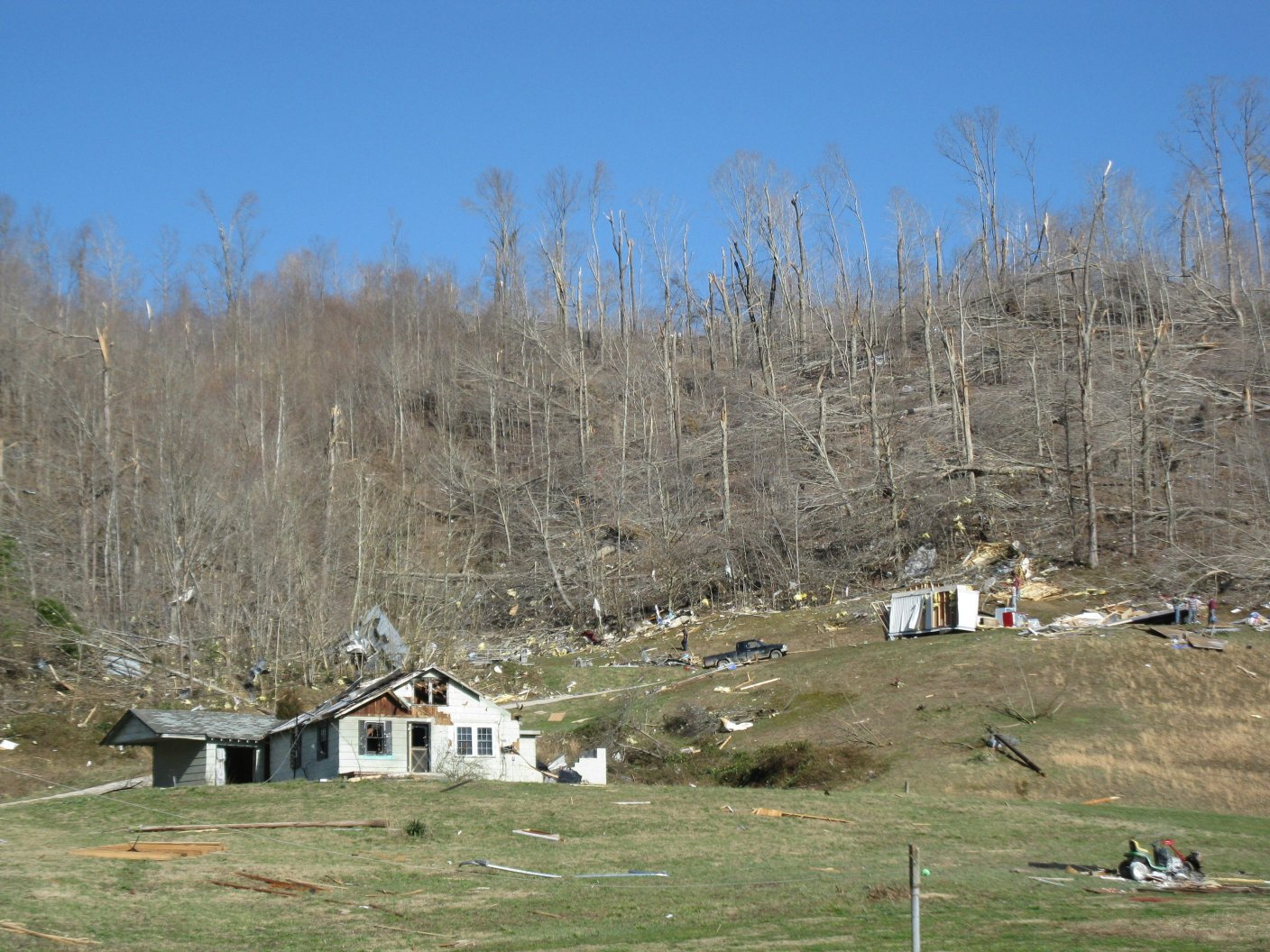
Damage in eastern Morgan County, Kentucky to residences near KY 172

Around 6:10 PM EST (23:10 UTC), the tornado exited Morgan County, and entered the regional county warning area of the National Weather Service in Charleston, West Virginia, into Lawrence County, remaining at EF3 intensity. In portions of the county, the tornado inflicted EF3 damage to two mobile homes along Skaggs Road with winds estimated at 140 mph (230 km/h). Two people inside these modular residences sustained injuries but survived. (Note: See [1] first part of "Event Details for Lawrence County, Kentucky (EF3 Tornado)") After traveling 2.48 mi (3.99 km) through Lawrence County in 3 minutes, the tornado entered Johnson County, back into the county warning area of the Jackson, Kentucky office at 6:13 PM EST (23:13 UTC). The tornado, upon its entry, weakened to EF1 intensity, with homes near Keaton sustaining minor roof damage and numerous trees being downed. (Note: See [1] "Event Details for Johnson County, Kentucky (EF1 Tornado)") The storm once again entered Lawrence County and the county warning area of the Charleston, West Virginia office near Martha, at 6:18 PM EST (23:18 UTC). Passing to the south of Blaine, the tornado struck the community building of the former city. Passing eastwards in between Blaine and Cordell, the tornado caused EF3 damage to a mobile home along Spencer Branch Road, lifting it off its CMU foundation and slamming into the adjacent hillside. Inside the home, three out of five people, an elderly couple and their 14-year-old granddaughter were later extricated out of the residence. Both the 14-year-old girl and her 65-year-old grandmother were killed, where as the 75-year-old grandfather survived with extreme injuries. The two others survivors were juveniles that were unharmed, and a neighbor nearby survived but suffered from a broken leg. Near Chapman, one family of four hunkered down inside a bathtub to ride out the tornado, ultimately surviving while their house was destroyed. In the Clifford area, the tornado reached its peak strength as mid-range EF3 winds that were estimated at 140–150 mph (230–240 km/h) struck and caused severe damage to homes along Rockcastle Creek. (Note: See [1] second part of "Event Details for Lawrence County, Kentucky (EF3 Tornado)")

The tornado maintained its strength as it entered Wayne County, West Virginia, into the Cabwaylingo State Forest at 6:38 PM EST (23:38 UTC). Many trees were blown down in this section of western Wayne County. Passing near Dunlow, the tornado impacted residences across several hilltops, with one home sustaining low-end EF3 damage from estimated winds of 138 mph (222 km/h), and at least three vehicles that were damaged in the vicinity. The tornado continued northeast, reaching the Cove Gap and Kiahsville areas and causing more damage to homes. Many residents in this area were attending a funeral of a local at the time and were away when the tornado passed through the East Lynn Lake area, which likely contributed to no reported casualties despite the damage. (Note: See [1] "Event Details for Wayne County, West Virginia (EF3 Tornado)")

=== Endpoint ===
The tornado then moved into Lincoln County at around 6:57 PM EST (23:57 UTC), as it weakened to EF1 intensity, with damage being inflicted to trees south of Ranger. After tracking through the county for 10 minutes, the tornado dissipated near Union Gap Road, east of Ranger, West Virginia at 7:07 PM EST (00:07 UTC), after being on the ground for 1 hour and 28 minutes. The tornado tracked a total distance of 84.99 mi (136.78 km) from its start in Menifee County, Kentucky, all the way to Lincoln County, West Virginia.. (Note: See [1] "Event Details for Lincoln County, West Virginia (EF1 Tornado)")

== Aftermath ==
=== Historical statistics ===
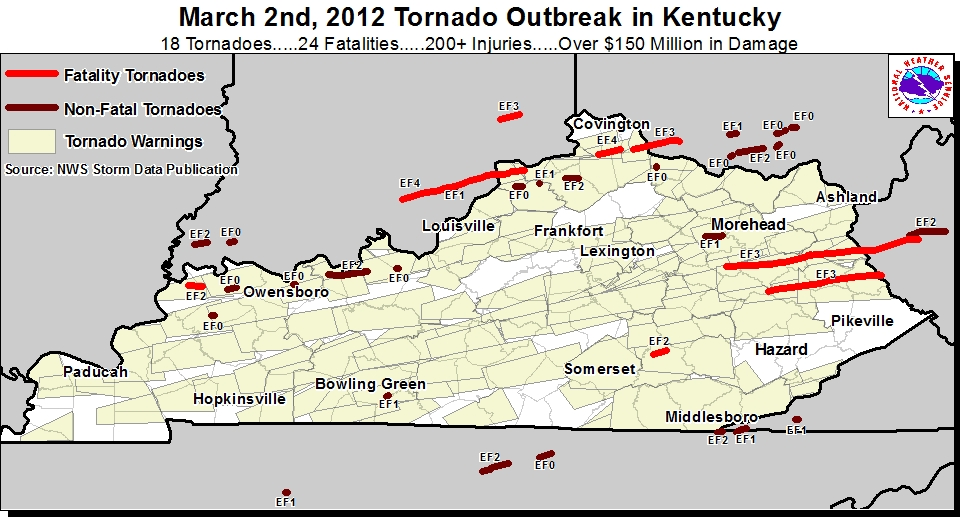
Map of Kentucky during the March 2, 2012 tornado outbreak. The West Liberty tornado was one of two fatal EF3 tornadoes in eastern Kentucky.

This long-track, killer tornado occurred alongside another significant EF3 tornado that impacted Salyersville, Kentucky, to Kermit, West Virginia, during the March 2, 2012 tornado outbreak. This represented the first time since 1988 that an intense (F3/EF3+) tornado was recorded in eastern Kentucky, with last one being an F3 tornado that struck Middlesboro near the Tennessee–Virginia tri-state border area on May 9 that year. It was also the first EF3 tornado to strike West Virginia in nearly two years, since one such tornado struck Belleville back on September 16, 2010.

During its respective 2012 outbreak, the West Liberty tornado was the longest tracked and lived tornado of the entire outbreak, lasting for 88 minutes along an 85 mi (137 km) path across Menifee, Morgan, Lawrence, Johnson, Wayne and Lincoln Counties across Kentucky and West Virginia. EF3 damage occurred in both states, though the highest wind estimate occurred in eastern Lawrence County, Kentucky, where winds of 140–150 mph (230–240 km/h) were estimated per the National Centers for Environmental Information. The EF3 tornado was also the second significant (EF2+) tornado to occur in the area of West Liberty, with the first tornado being an EF2 with estimated winds of 120 mph (190 km/h) that struck to the south of the city. That storm was part of a separate but similar outbreak two days earlier on February 29.

=== Damage and casualties ===
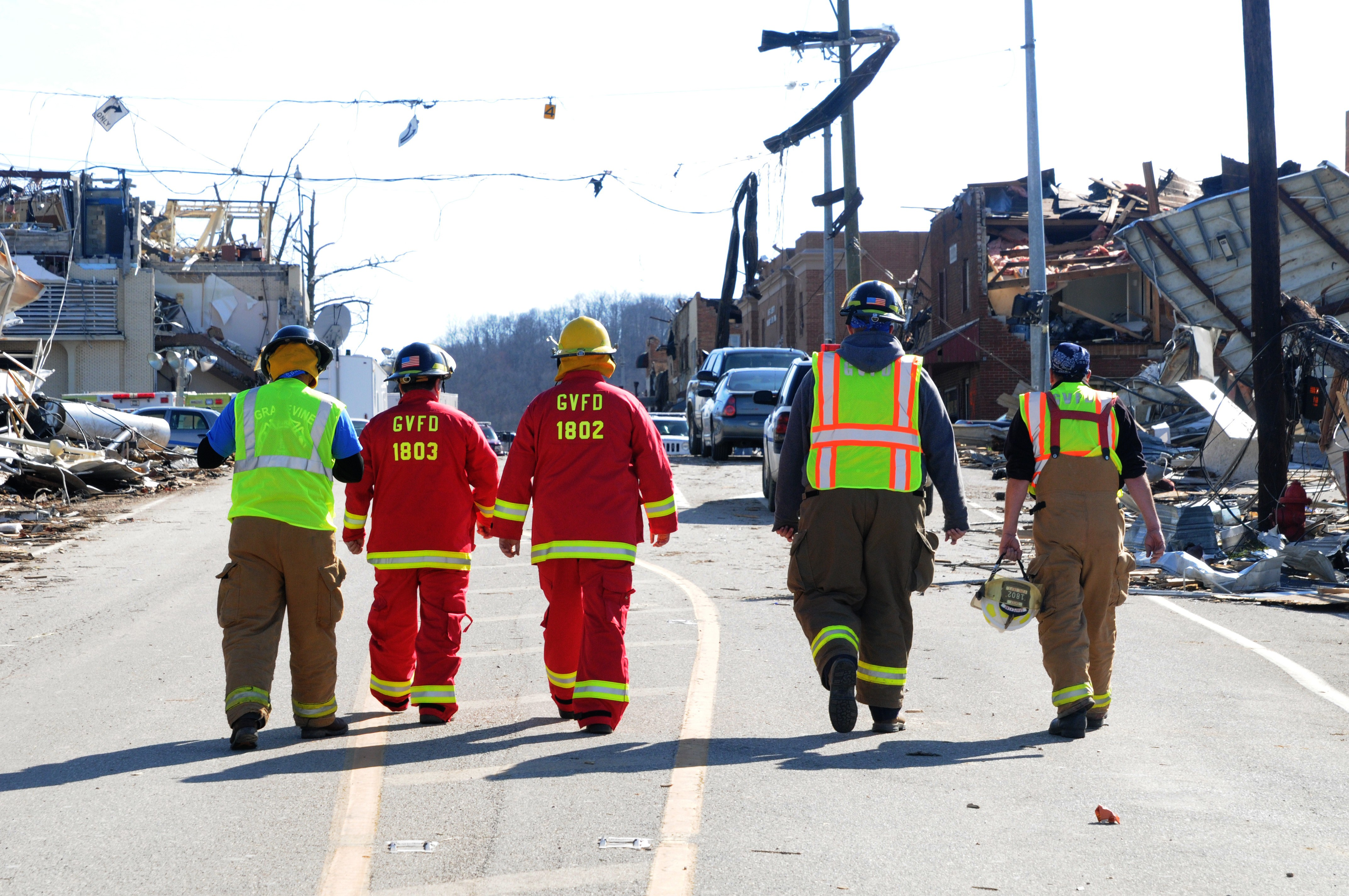
Firefighters from the Grape Vine Fire Department assist local and state law enforcement officials, along with Kentucky National Guard members, in relief efforts taking place in West Liberty following the 2012 tornado.

The tornado destroyed an estimated 390 homes throughout Morgan County, and caused $81.475 million (2012 USD) in damages with the largest portion of the total monetary costs being from West Liberty and the county alone, at $75 million (2012 USD). Many structures from Menifee to Johnson Counties were affected by the tornado, despite the rural nature of the area it occurred in. In Lawrence County, Kentucky, the National Weather Service in Jackson, Kentucky during their damage assessment reported around 30 homes that were destroyed, and another nine damaged to some degree. In Wayne County, West Virginia, the Charleston, West Virginia weather forecasting office concluded that around 18 homes were destroyed, with seven sustaining major damage.

Within Kentucky, 10 direct and one indirect fatality death were attributed to the tornado. Six of the fatalities were from Morgan County alone. The oldest and youngest victims were 90 to 14 years old, with most of the fatalities occurring mainly within mobile homes. These types of residences are very common in many parts of the Appalachian Mountains, which encompasses eastern Kentucky and all of West Virginia due to the region's high poverty rates and how affordable they are. Mobile homes are not able to withstand weaker tornadoes, including EF1-intensity tornadoes with wind speeds around 110 mph (180 km/h). During tornadoes, these structures have a higher fatality rate when compared to other structures.

This list compiles exclusively of fatalities attributed by the EF3 West Liberty, Kentucky, tornado.

| Name | Age | Gender | Location | County | City/Area |
|---|---|---|---|---|---|
| Beverly Bowman | 47 | Female | Permanent Structure | Menifee | Frenchburg, KY |
| Anita Smith | 54 | Female | Mobile/Trailer Home | Menifee | Frenchburg, KY |
| Vershal Brown (Indirect) | 79 | Male | Permanent Structure | Menifee | Frenchburg, KY |
| Wilmer Cecil | 90 | Male | Mobile/Trailer Home | Morgan | Woodsbend, KY |
| Emma Dean Cecil | 86 | Female | Mobile/Trailer Home | Morgan | Woodsbend, KY |
| Alex Dulin | 86 | Male | Permanent Home | Morgan | West Liberty, KY |
| Elizabeth Endicott | 72 | Female | Mobile/Trailer Home | Morgan | Blackwater, KY |
| Charles Endicott | 51 | Male | Mobile/Trailer Home | Morgan | Blackwater, KY |
| Betty Sue Endicott | 50 | Female | Mobile/Trailer Home | Morgan | Blackwater, KY |
| Joyce Chaffins | 65 | Female | Mobile/Trailer Home | Lawrence | Louisa, KY |
| Samantha Wood | 14 | Female | Mobile/Trailer Home | Lawrence | Louisa, KY |

=== Recovery process ===
==== West Liberty area ====
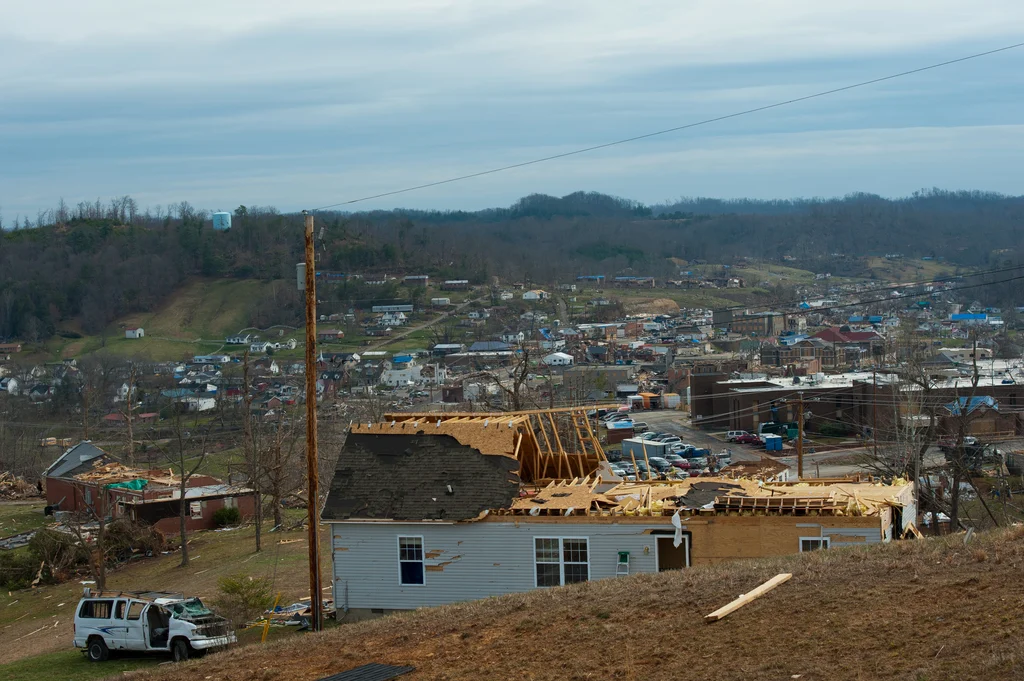
View of West Liberty ten days after the tornado, on March 12, 2012

West Liberty recovered significantly after the tornado. Around $30 million (2012 USD) were pledged into the city, from both government and private sources. Morgan County, Kentucky received the most help from volunteers and aid workers. After the tornado, the Kentucky National Guard and First Response Team of America arrived to West Liberty to conduct clean-up efforts and search/rescue missions, alongside the Federal Emergency Management Agency and former Kentucky governor Steve Beshear visiting West Liberty, and other affected counties in the state to tour the extent of the damage caused by the destructive tornado outbreak, on March 3. A few weeks later, 44 volunteers, consisting of 33 students and 11 staff from West Liberty University in West Liberty, West Virginia, came in to clean up the debris alongside aiding victims that were impacted. By October 25, 2012, the volunteers returned after to assist in the reconstruction of the "sister city." On August 28, 2015, the city was featured on the PBS television show Eco-Sense for Living for their “Rebuilding West Liberty Kentucky” effort. 52 new homes were constructed and Energy Star-certified in the area by then, with much of the town reducing their electricity usage and becoming more energy efficient in the wake of rebuilding. The community was heavily inspired by the recovery process of Greensburg, Kansas after their encounter with a devastating EF5 tornado on May 4, 2007. In July 2016, the commercial bank, which was among the many damaged buildings in West Liberty reopened after four years since the tornado. The same year, the city installed two tornado sirens. 10 years later by 2022, West Liberty and Morgan County recovered completely, though the tornado's long-term impact persisted on.

On December 10, 2021, parts of Kentucky were impacted by a historic tornado, rated EF4 and that tracked 165.6 mi (266.5 km) throughout the western parts of the state. Survivors of the 2012 West Liberty tornado reacted with empathy, alongside also giving reassurance and advice to the heavily impacted communities of Mayfield, Dawson Springs, Bremen, and many others that were destroyed by the 2021 tornado and other tornadoes from that outbreak.

==== Other regions ====
On March 6, 2012, then U.S. president Barack Obama declared the Commonwealth of Kentucky to be eligible for federal aid. The Federal Emergency Management Agency (FEMA) granted federal aid under its Individual Assistance program to several counties that were impacted by the tornadoes four days earlier throughout Kentucky, including Menifee, Morgan, Lawrence and Johnson Counties. All counties in Kentucky that were affected were eligible to apply for assistance under the Hazard Mitigation Grant Program. In Lawrence County, Kentucky, 200 people were approved by FEMA for housing assistance. $300,000 (2012 USD) was used for debris clean-up and road repair efforts within the area.

=== Lawsuit and corruption ===
==== EDS, Inc. v. County of Morgan ====
In May 2015, Morgan County, Kentucky was sued for owing nearly $1 million (2015 USD) in debt from Emergency Disaster Services (EDS), a Lexington-based company in which Morgan County rented various types of equipment from following the 2012 tornado. These included temporary housing trailers, generators, all-terrain vehicles and other apparatus and necessities used during the recovery process. EDS demanded to be paid by the local government for the resourcing and reconstruction of West Liberty and the county. Morgan County in response accused the company owner Jerry Lundergan, father of then state secretary Alison Lundergan Grimes and a former Kentucky Democratic Party chairman, for price gouging. This was noticed by officials from Morgan County's insurance company, Underwriters Safety & Claims of Louisville, after an increase of bills in value handed out by the company. These bills increased from tens of thousands to hundreds of thousands of dollars per Underwriters.

==== Contract rigging scandals ====
Officials of the county claimed Jerry Lundergan entered a shady business deal with Timothy Alexander Conley, Morgan County's former judge-executive who was sentenced in 2014 to seven years in a federal prison. The ex-county judge-executive was convicted for taking more than $120,000 (2014 USD) in kickbacks, as well as bribery and other forms of corruption in Morgan County. EDS was not included within the prosecution of Conley. All records related to the EDS deal were seized by the Federal Bureau of Investigation in their investigation of Conley's tenure in 2015.

Prior from 2009 to 2013, Conley rigged the county's competitive bidding process concerning local building projects, including tornado reconstruction, to select a contractor named PBTHNOJJ Construction as part of a mail fraud scheme. Based in Salyersville, Kentucky, the bridge contractor was operated by the co-founders Kenneth Lee Gambill and Ruth Gambill. Following the 2012 tornado, PBTHNOJJ Construction was among the many organizations hired by Morgan County for reconstruction contracts. Conley abused his position as judge-executive to award PBTHNOJJ Construction with excessive payments for work regarding clean-up efforts, where as Kenneth Gambill in return delivered cash kickbacks. In December 2013, both Gambills and Conley were indicted for various counts of federal crimes involving money laundering and fraud, especially defrauding a federally-funded program in which Conley misappropriated money from the county. By 2014, Kenneth Lee and Ruth Gambill, alongside Conley pleaded guilty for their crimes per the Department of Justice.

== Radar analysis ==
=== Research ===
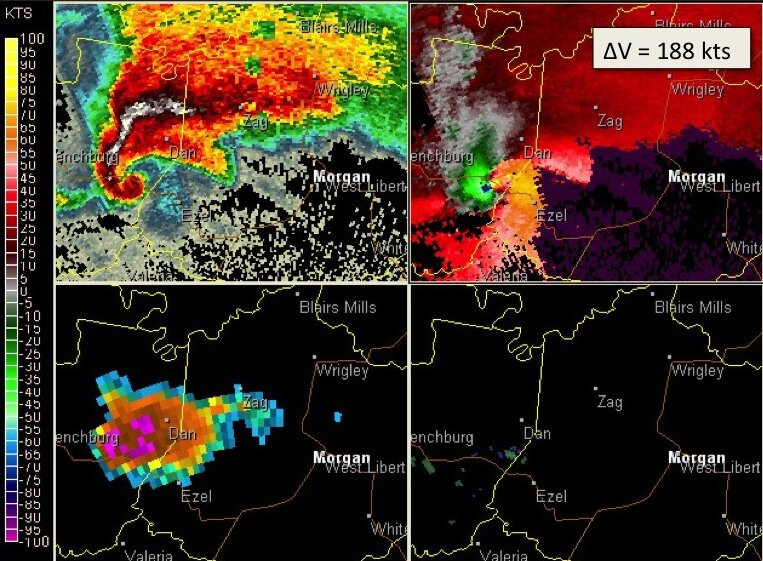
Next-Generation Radar data of the 2012 tornado and supercell shown on GR2Analyst and selected on velocity mode (top right panel). A Delta-V of 188 knots is measured from approximately 20 nautical miles away. (Note: 20 nautical miles (23 mi; 37 km))

In March 2012, James LaDue, an experienced National Weather Service and Storm Prediction Center meteorologist, and an American Meteorological Society Certified Consulting Meteorologist, conducted an independent technical analysis on his personal website of the 2012 West Liberty tornado. Through his research, LaDue concluded that the tornado had two artifact inflow channels feeding into the large parent circulation. These were thought to occur through both the forward flank downdraft, (Note: The forward flank downdraft (FFD) is a region of moist, rain-cooled air within the northern side of a supercell, or northeast of the updraft (upwind air currents) depending on the storm motion. This downdraft (downwind air currents) is responsible for torrential rainfall, large hail and damaging winds.) (Note: In contrast to the FFD in [nb 5], the rear flank downdraft (RFD) depending on storm motion, usually arrives from the southern flank of a storm or southwest of an updraft. The RFD brings with it warm and dry air that wraps around the updraft base, and is crucial for tornadogenesis and intensification. The RFD though can also appear "wet" just like the FFD, when encountering a high-precipitation supercell.) and accelerated inflow bands ahead of the tornadic supercell. LaDue also calculated the "gate-to-gate" windspeeds of the tornado vortex signature, through the WSR-88D radar stationed at the National Weather Service office in Jackson, Kentucky. He estimated that the tornado couplet had a velocity difference (Delta-V) of 188 kn (216 mph; 348 km/h) on both the inbound and outbound velocity outputs. (Note: The inbound and outbound outputs refer to Weather Surveillance Radar - 1988 Doppler (WSR-88D) radial velocity mode measures. The inbound winds are shown in green, and refer to winds heading towards the radar. The opposite outbound winds appear as red, and are winds that move away from the radar.) The KJKL radar site was purportedly around 20 nmi (37 km) from the tornado as it was recording this measurement.

=== Results ===
LaDue's assessments of the 2012 West Liberty tornado showed that the storm exhibited high wind velocity differentials via NEXRAD scans, surpassing his other analysis of the Bridge Creek, Oklahoma tornado from 1999, (Note: This tornado is regarded to have the highest wind speed measurement ever recorded, which was analyzed by a Doppler on Wheels (DOW) mobile radar truck.) in which he recorded a Delta-V of 147 kn (169 mph; 272 km/h). This measurement of the 1999 tornado was possibly due to debris interference, according to him. Despite the 2012 tornado's high estimates by LaDue, he ranked it behind other tornadoes, such as the Tuscaloosa, Alabama, Joplin, Missouri or El Reno, Oklahoma tornadoes from 2011. These tornadoes based on the research of his had higher statistics, such as width, Delta-V outputs and storm core radius sizes, though some had varying distances in between them and the closest radar sites.

== See also ==
- Tornado myths – Includes common misconceptions, such as that tornadoes do not track across mountains
- Tornado climatology
- Weather of 2012
- Tornadoes of 2012
- List of North American tornadoes and tornado outbreaks
- 2012 Henryville tornado – A deadly EF4 tornado that impacted southern Indiana hours prior
- 2012 Crittenden–Piner tornado – A lethal EF4 tornado that took place hours earlier in northern Kentucky, impacting areas of the Cincinnati, Ohio metropolitan area
- 2012 East Bernstadt tornado – Another deadly and significant EF2 tornado in eastern Kentucky that occurred after nightfall during the same outbreak
- 2025 Somerset–London tornado – A violent EF4 tornado in Kentucky that impacted parts of the western Cumberland Plateau region of the Appalachian Mountains
