= Keaton =

Keaton may refer to:

- Keaton (name)
- 2712 Keaton, a main-belt asteroid named after Buster Keaton
- Keaton, Kentucky, U.S., unincorporated community in Johnson County
- Keatons, a race of fictional, fox-like creatures in The Legend of Zelda series of video games

== See also ==
- Keeton (disambiguation)
