= Keeton (disambiguation) =

The Keeton was an automobile built from 1912 to 1914.

Keeton may also refer to:

- Keeton (surname)
- Keeton v. Hustler Magazine, Inc., 1984 case

== See also ==
- Keaton (disambiguation)
