= List of killings by law enforcement officers in the United States, November 2025 =

This is a list of people reported killed by non-military law enforcement officers in the United States in November 2025, whether in the line of duty or not, and regardless of reason or method. The listing documents the occurrence of a death, making no implications regarding wrongdoing or justification on the part of the person killed or officer involved. Killings are arranged by date of the incident that caused death. Different death dates, if known, are noted in the description. The table below lists 86 people.

== November 2025 ==
Date	Name (age) of deceased	Race	Location	Description
2025-11-30	John Carlos Daniel Yangco Haas (30)	Asian	Tamuning, Guam	Off-duty officer Derrick Florenzo Atan struck and killed a cyclist before leaving the scene. He was charged with seven offenses, including vehicular homicide.
2025-11-30	unidentified male	Unknown	Riverton, Wyoming	An out-of-state domestic violence suspect was shot and killed by a Wyoming state trooper in a hotel room at the Wind River Hotel and Casino.
2025-11-30	Jacob Carl Mercer (23)	White	Maryland Heights, Missouri	St. Louis County Police shot and killed a St. Peters, Missouri man at a Walgreens pharmacy after he allegedly fired at them. Authorities confirmed that the man suffered severe mental health problems following a breakup with his fiancée on Thanksgiving Day.
2025-11-30	Christina Miranda (35)	Hispanic	Philadelphia, Pennsylvania	Police responded to reports of a woman with a gun in North Philadelphia and found her holding a gun to her head. After a taser failed to work, the woman fled across a street, and police shot her after she allegedly pointed the gun at them.
2025-11-29	Timothy Keeton (69)	White	Martha, Kentucky	State troopers were attempting to arrest a wanted woman. Upon arrival, Keeton, an unrelated person, threatened to shoot the lights off the police vehicles before returning to retrieve a gun. He reportedly aimed the gun at troopers before they shot him.
2025-11-28	Brian S. Romero-Hester (32)	Unknown	San Bernardino, California	SBPD officers shot and killed a suspect amid an armed robbery. Police said a clerk managed to disarm the suspect and flagged down an officer when the suspect went back to the parking lot to retrieve another rifle. The suspect aimed the rifle at other arriving officers before they opened fire.
2025-11-28	unidentified male (47)	Unknown	Tucson, Arizona	Pima County deputies shot a man who approached them and produced a gun after they were dispatched to a domestic violence situation with shots being fired.
2025-11-28	Jamal Dangelo Williams (26)	Black	Birmingham, Alabama	A police officer shot Williams during the encounter in the Kingston area after they responded to shots fired reports detected on ShotSpotter. Williams produced a gun when officers were giving verbal commands to show his hands. The footage was released by BPD.
2025-11-27	unidentified male	Unknown	La Feria, Texas	La Feria officers responded to a report of a reckless driver who was parking at a handicap parking space. They subsequently noticed that the vehicle was stolen. When an officer attempted to arrest the suspect, the suspect entered the vehicle, putting it in reverse and dragged an officer with it. The officer shot him in defense. The suspect died in the hospital several days later.
2025-11-26	Cindy Wiatrek (67)	White	Seguin, Texas	A Seguin officer fatally struck a pedestrian with a department-issued vehicle while the officer was driving to work.
2025-11-26	Aden Alcide Jeannoutot (18)	Unknown	Greeley, Colorado	During a traffic stop outside the North Colorado Medical Center, a wanted male passenger was ordered to leave the vehicle. He ignored and reportedly reached toward a bag on his lap. The Greeley officer then fatally shot the man, killing him on-scene.
2025-11-26	Julias Jones (37)	White	Trenton, Michigan	Police issued a BOLO on Jones's vehicle after he shot and wounded a security guard at a club in Inkster. Trenton Police located Jones's vehicle and shot him after he allegedly fired at them.
2025-11-25	Robert Bido (47)	Unknown	Franklin, Indiana	Police were searching for Bido, who was wanted on multiple warrants and was also a person of interest in an Indianapolis homicide. They located him in a parking lot inside a semitruck cab. Following a standoff, police shot Bido.
2025-11-25	Jacob Cole Rushing (31)	Unknown	Roseville, California	A knife-wielding man reportedly charged at Placer County deputies before they opened fire. De-escalation efforts failed.
2025-11-24	unidentified male	Unknown	Hillsboro, Texas	A man reportedly confronted a Hill County sheriff's deputy with a gun during a welfare check. The deputy fatally shot the man in a shoot-out.
2025-11-24	Kedric McDonald (31)	Black	Dallas, Texas	Dallas Police were dispatched to a disturbance in Downtown Dallas. Upon arrival, officers found four men shot before immediately confronted the shooter. Two Dallas officers subsequently shot McDonald after he pointed his weapon at officers, killing him on-scene. One of the four male victims, a 27-year-old man, also died from his injuries on-scene. The footage was released.
2025-11-23	Jaja Zambrowski Davis Jr. (27)	Black	Lanett, Alabama	Police attempted to arrest Davis Jr., for he reportedly had fired at Lanett Police vehicles. An exchanged of fire ensued and he was fatally shot by officers.
2025-11-23	Gustavo Sandoval-Rico (27)	Hispanic	Houston, Texas	HPD officers responded to a mental health crisis call. An officer was stabbed in the head before another officer shot the suspect dead. The footage was released.
2025-11-23	Nicholas Adam Parker (42)	White	Lucedale, Mississippi	George County deputies attempted to serve a warrant on Parker. During the encounter, Parker barricaded himself and fired at them. A SWAT team was called to the scene. The SWAT members were fired upon before they returned fire, killing him.
2025-11-23	Brett Jividen (35)	Unknown	Tucson, Arizona	A juvenile called the police, reporting that a family member had threatened him with a gun. Tucson officers later evacuated the two children while a male suspect barricaded himself inside a home. Despite negotiation efforts, the man exited the room and pointed a gun at officers before being shot. The footage was released.
2025-11-23	Jack Andrew Smiley (27)	Unknown	Guntersville, Alabama	Marshall County Deputies and GPD Officers were conducting a joint child sex predator operation. The suspect, Smiley, reportedly attempted to flee and presented a weapon. Police fatally shot him thereafter.
2025-11-22	Todd Donahue (51)	White	Bradenton, Florida	According to BPD, Donahue called the police claiming that he was being chased by the cartel. Officers then responded to another call regarding his erratic behavior at a business establishment. Under the Baker Act, officers later detained him for protective custody despite his resistance and sent him to a hospital. He became unresponsive and died at the hospital.
2025-11-22	William Jenkins (18)	Black	Louisville, Kentucky	LMPD officers responded to a robbery report in the Southside area and found the suspect near the scene. The suspect fled and fired a shot when the officers shot him. Police released the footage.
2025-11-22	unidentified male	Unknown	Elizabethton, Tennessee	Carter County deputies responded to a vandalism report and found a suspect whom later barricaded himself. Despite less-lethal efforts, the man fired shots at them and obliterated a police drone. Deputies ultimately opened fire, killing him.
2025-11-22	Everett Nunn (58)	Black	Evansville, Indiana	EPD officers responded to a disturbance between a father and a son. According to the caller, a gun was in the home. Upon arrival, an officer shot the father who was holding a black gun shaped marijuana smoking device. The footage was released by police.
2025-11-22	Deante Hawthorne (34)	Black	Oklahoma City, Oklahoma	Officers shot Hawthorne after he crashed a vehicle during a pursuit before attempting to carjack a person. Hawthorne was connected to a spree killing earlier that day began in Moore which killed three people and injured another. The footage was released by police.
2025-11-22	Jose Domingo Ayala Alas (37)	Hispanic	Burbank, California	Officers attempted a routine traffic stop when a man jumped out of the passenger seat of a vehicle and darted onto an onramp, where he climbed an embankment wall and escaped to a nearby neighborhood. A search ensued using a helicopter and a K-9. During the search the man encountered the dog and shot it multiple times with a handgun, killing it, before fleeing on foot. The man was eventually located, still armed. Multiple attempts were made to negotiate with the man and urge him to surrender peacefully, but he refused. During the deployment of less-than-lethal munitions to attempt to make him surrender, he opened fire on police. Authorities said he struck multiple police vehicles, leading to officers returning fire and killing him. Police released the footage.
2025-11-21	Jeremy Lawrence Jr. (23)	Black	Pine Bluff, Arkansas	Officers were in pursuit of a vehicle after it was seen speeding. The vehicle stopped at an intersection before Lawrence Jr. exited and took off running armed with a firearm. Officers shot Lawrence Jr., killing him. Two other men in the vehicle were arrested. The footage was released and the officers involved were cleared of wrongdoing.
2025-11-21	Christopher Pearson (36)	White	Beresford, South Dakota	Police conducted a traffic stop for a traffic violation on a Ford Explorer in a parking lot. Police said Pearson pulled out a gun, leading an officer to shoot him.
2025-11-21	Michael Halberstam (37)	White	Vero Beach, Florida	Three Indian River County sheriff's deputies were attempting to serve an eviction notice before they got ambushed by the gunman, Halberstam. Halberstam shot and killed Sgt. Terri Sweeting-Mashkow and locksmith David Long, while injuring another deputy. Another sergeant subsequently returned fire and shot him dead.
2025-11-21	Rodolfo Requenes (50)	Unknown	Lafayette, Indiana	Police pulled Requenes over for suspected drunk driving, but he drove off. Police tracked him to the parking lot of an apartment complex, where police said he claimed he had a weapon. Officers shot Requenes after he allegedly moved his hand towards the back of his waistband.
2025-11-21	Darius Kennedy (31)	White	Airport Township, St. Louis County, Missouri	Police officers at St. Louis Lambert International Airport were conducting routine checks when they encountered a man with a knife. The officers shot the man after he approached them and refused to drop the knife. The footage was released.
2025-11-20	Gabriela Moreno (42)	Hispanic	Alhambra, California	When Alhambra Police were pursuing a stolen SUV, the SUV collided with Police Officer Alec Sanders's cruiser, killing the officer and a passenger in the stolen vehicle. The driver has been charged with murder.
2025-11-19	Kentae Govan (41)	Black	Lakeland, Florida	Govan was shot and killed by Polk County deputies near Eaton Park after he reportedly charged at them with the same brick he beat an elderly man with. Tasers did not work.
2025-11-18	Kiavik Galarza Miranda (31)	Unknown	Corona, California	Police responded to a call that a man was swinging what resembled a crowbar at vehicles near an Applebee's restaurant. Officers shot and killed the man after he allegedly refused to drop the item, later identified as a tire iron. Authorities also said the man assaulted a motorist.
2025-11-18	Albert Benson (62)	Black	Oklahoma City, Oklahoma	OCPD responded to a report about a man who assaulted a person with a machete and left. When officers arrived, the suspect returned to the scene wielding a machete. After less-lethal projectiles were deployed, officers fatally shot him when he approached. Police released the footage.
2025-11-18	unidentified male	Unknown	Richmond County, North Carolina	While Richmond County deputies were executing a warrant, they found the suspect driving on a private road. He reportedly tried to ram over deputies with his pickup truck before being fatally shot.
2025-11-17	Eric Grigsby (50)	White	Midland, Georgia	Grigsby shot and killed two of his stepchildren before Harris County deputies arrived at the scene. During the encounter, Grigsby walked toward them while wielding two handguns. Deputies killed him in a shootout.
2025-11-17	Johnny Michael Queen (41)	White	Marion County, Tennessee	Queen, a homicide suspect, was shot and killed by two Sequatchie County deputies when he pointed a gun at them during a standoff near Walden.
2025-11-17	Matthew Tyler Charles (39)	Native American	Port Angeles, Washington	Multiple agencies attempted to arrest a man on a U.S. Marshals warrant for assault. Following a pursuit, in which the man allegedly pulled out a handgun, police shot and killed the man.
2025-11-17	DaShawn Anthony Larode (24)	Black	New York City, New York	Police were guarding a homicide scene at a Brownsville, Brooklyn apartment building when the homicide suspect fired a shotgun at an officer. The injured officer returned fire, killing the suspect. NYPD released the footage.
2025-11-17	Thomas Noble (37)	White	Union Township, Clermont County, Ohio	After police responded to a 911 hang-up call, the incident escalated into a hostage situation. They shot and killed Noble. The footage was released.
2025-11-17	David Warren Childs (25)	Black	Washington, D.C.	MPD officers received shots fired reports before patrol officers encountered an armed suspect. When an officer ordered him to show his hands, he fled, which later led to a struggle between the two. The officer ultimately shot the suspect. Police released the footage.
2025-11-16	Devonte Armand Hinton (33)	Black	Savannah, Georgia	Police attempted to pull Hinton over for speeding on the highway. A state trooper performed a PIT maneuver on Hinton's vehicle, causing him to crash. He was ejected from the vehicle and died at the scene.
2025-11-16	unidentified	Unknown	Cedaredge, Colorado	A Cedaredge Police officer-involved crash led to the death of a motorist. No other details were released.
2025-11-16	Benjamin Sink (47)	White	Waterloo, Iowa	State troopers along with other agencies were pursuing a man out of Waterloo for unknown reasons. When the man exited the car and fired at them, troopers and Grundy County deputies returned fire, killing him. The Iowa Attorney General’s Office justified the case and a still image of Sink pointing a gun at troopers was shown in the report.
2025-11-16	James Weyaus (37)	Native American	Walker, Minnesota	Sheriff's deputies responded to a report of gunshots and encountered a suspect. The man fled on foot and fired at deputies, hitting one, before police shot and killed him. CCSO released the footage.
2025-11-15	Stephen M. McMillan (22)	White	Carbondale, Kansas	Police were called to a rural farmhouse for a domestic disturbance. Ten minutes after they arrived, a shoot-out occurred, and McMillan shot and injured three sheriff's deputies and a state trooper before being shot and killed. His grandfather was also injured during the shoot-out.
2025-11-15	Ryan Huinker (28)	White	Latrobe, Pennsylvania	A caller told police her husband, Huinker, was firing off shots at their home. When state troopers and Latrobe Police arrived, a shootout occurred which left Huinker dead.
2025-11-15	unidentified male	Unknown	Sarasota, Florida	After responding to a suicide call, Sarasota County deputies shot a man who was holding a gun.
2025-11-14	Kaleb Zachary Williams (20)	White	Orlando, Florida	Police responded to a tip that employees of a tattoo shop were selling drugs out of the business and executed a warrant. When a different man stepped out of the back entrance holding a rifle, an officer shot at him. Williams, a tattoo artist at the business, was found dead by gunshot. Police said they found a stolen gun on him. The video was released.
2025-11-14	unidentified male	White	Braceville Township, Ohio	Deputies and officers responded to reports of a man brandishing a gun in the roadway. When they engaged with the suspect, shots were fired and the suspect was killed.
2025-11-14	Kevin Booker (41)	Black	Washington, D.C.	A suspect reportedly violated his restraining order and showed up at a home with weapons. When MPD officers entered the home after orders being ignored, the suspect reportedly lunged toward them with a knife and a screwdriver. Officers then opened fire.
2025-11-14	Christopher Lindner (40)	White	Manchester, Ohio	Police received a 911 call and a pursuit ensued involving Adams County deputies. After the high speed chase, the suspect entered a house before exiting with a gun. West Union Police subsequently shot him. His family stated that he suffered from mental illness. The footage was released.
2025-11-14	Joseph Suddreth (37)	Unknown	Denver, Colorado	Two Denver police officers fatally shot a burglary suspect, Suddreth who walked towards them with a honing rod.
2025-11-13	Elijah Brown (20)	Black	New York City, New York	NYPD responded to reports regarding a man who pointed a gun at people, demanded a worker to call the police, and threatened to shoot up a hospital before fleeing, in Manhattan's Upper East Side. A brief struggle later ensued when the suspect encountered an off-duty officer in Mount Sinai Hospital. When the other officers arrived, the suspect fired the gun at them and with multiple civilians in the line of fire before they returned fire and shot him dead. Police released the footage.
2025-11-13	Dennis Hoie (75)	White	Bagley, Minnesota	At a Cenex gas station, a Clearwater County deputy attempted to arrest a man he recognized for being wanted on a felony warrant, resulting in a scuffle between the two. The man got into his car and drove away, sparking a pursuit that ended in a home's yard. A deputy shot the man after he fired a flare gun at him. Hoie was a Vietnam veteran with mental health issues. The footage was released by CCSO.
2025-11-11	Jose Reynaldo Lombera (48)	Hispanic	Redwood City, California	Police responded to reports of a man firing into a sidewalk before fleeing. When they found the man and attempted to contact him, the man reportedly grabbed his gun and pointed it toward RCPD officers. Officers subsequently shot him with both less-lethal and lethal ammunition, killing him.
2025-11-11	Patrick Freeland (24)	White	Conroe, Texas	When a Conroe ISD officer was heading northbound while turning into a driveway, a motorcyclist driving at a high rate of speed collided with the officer's vehicle. The rider died as a result.
2025-11-11	Hugo Polanco (56)	Unknown	Los Angeles, California	Multiple people called police to report a man swinging a chain at pedestrians and drivers in the Watts neighborhood. Police used less-lethal weapons, but they did not work, and officers shot the man after he advanced towards officers with the chain. LAPD released the footage.
2025-11-10	unidentified male (34)	Unknown	Dickinson, North Dakota	Dickinson Police went to conduct a welfare check on a man who was making suicidal statements. When they arrived at the parking lot of the St. Alexius Hospital ER, they were told that the man had fired a gun several times. During the encounter, an officer perceived a lethal threat and fatally shot the armed man.
2025-11-09	Michael Andre Greene (53)	Unknown	Magnolia, Arkansas	Greene reportedly fired a gun during an encounter with a MPD officer before being shot. He died several days later.
2025-11-08	Scott Forrest	Unknown	Tulsa, Oklahoma	A woman called police to report Forrest, her boyfriend, was holding her at gunpoint in their apartment. During the stand-off, Forrest fired several shots through the wall. After several hours, Forrest approached a window and members of the Special Operations Team shot him.
2025-11-08	Casey Nelms (31)	White	McAlester, Oklahoma	During a welfare check, police shot and killed Nelms after he allegedly approached them with a knife.
2025-11-08	Michael Duarte (39)	White	Castroville, Texas	Michael Duarte, a popular social media influencer who made food- and barbecue-themed content under the name FoodWithBearHands, was shot by a deputy in Castroville, Texas. A spokesperson for police claimed that Duarte was wielding a knife, threatened and approached the responding deputy, and did not follow numerous “verbal commands” to get on the ground. Prior to becoming a successful influencer, Duarte had attended rehab for mental health issues.
2025-11-07	Brad (30)	White	Nashville, Tennessee	Police responded to a man who made a suicidal 911 call at a bus station. Officers shot the man after he refused to remove his hand from his pocket and said he had a gun. No gun was found on the man or in his backpack. The footage was released by MNPD.
2025-11-07	Adam Randall Richards (37)	White	Whitehall, Michigan	A caller wanted police to conduct a welfare check on their son, worrying he might try to harm himself. When Muskegon County deputies arrived at the room, a man with self-inflicted injuries charged at a deputy with a box cutter before being shot.
2025-11-06	Caleb Weis (26)	Black	Fishers, Indiana	Weis, the suspect in a 2024 homicide, was shot by officers after firing at them as they served an arrest warrant for him. He died of his injuries on November 29.
2025-11-06	Chiquita DeNorris George (40)	Black	Shelby, North Carolina	During a domestic dispute, off-duty Cleveland County deputy Mitchell Hilton was suspected of shooting and killing his wife. He has been charged with first-degree murder.
2025-11-06	Fredrick Mabe (72)	White	Princeton, West Virginia	Mabe, a man who shot his brother and barricaded himself, was shot dead by Special Response Team members when he fired at them.
2025-11-06	Kennedy Graham (36)	Black	Miami, Florida	A loss prevention officer at a Walmart informed a sheriff's deputy that a man was actively stealing. The deputy pursued the man in the parking lot on foot, and the two got into a physical altercation. According to a witness, the man displayed a weapon during the altercation, leading the deputy to shoot him. The footage was released.
2025-11-06	Ali Bayhan (38)	Middle Eastern	Gainesville, Florida	Police attempted to arrest Bayhan for making threats targeting politicians and a Jewish temple in Tallahassee. Police shot and killed Bayhan after he allegedly reached for a gun.
2025-11-05	Brandon Higgins (40)	White	Hopkinsville, Kentucky	Higgins jumped over a guardrail and ran into the path of a Christian County deputy’s vehicle before being fatally struck. Police stated that the deputy was responding to a burglary call and Higgins fit the description of the fleeing suspect.
2025-11-05	Robert Liddell (72)	White	Alpine, California	During a welfare check, San Diego sheriff's deputies entered Liddell's home after announcing themselves. Liddell emerged with a BB gun before they shot him. The footage was released by police.
2025-11-05	William Nelson Griffin (45)	White	Suffolk, Virginia	Police approached a vehicle that was stolen out of Chesapeake. As two officers approached the car, the driver shot at them. Police returned fire, killing the suspect.
2025-11-04	Malik Avila (24)	Black	Indian Springs, Nevada	Avila was an inmate convicted of homicide and was incarcerated in High Desert State Prison. According to Avila family's attorney, a whistle blower's audio recorded that Avila was involved in an altercation with prison guards over an unauthorized phone before being beaten while he was pleading. Avila was transported to a hospital and stayed on life support for 18 days before he died. On the other hand, the Clark County Coroner's Office officially ruled the death "natural," citing brain damage and oxygen deprivation following an initial refusal of medical care.
2025-11-04	Ernest Pino (31)	Unknown	Durango, Colorado	Police were called for a report of a fight between a man and woman in a moving vehicle on the highway. After police stopped the vehicle, the woman exited and ran to officers. Police shot and killed the man after he allegedly followed her holding an axe and bat.
2025-11-03	Jalin Scott Willyard (26)	White	Alva, Oklahoma	Willyard pulled a gun on Woods County deputies and APD officers during a welfare check and was fatally shot. The footage before the fatal shooting was released under OSBI's permission.
2025-11-03	Timothy Glenn Gaskill, Jr. (39)	White	Carteret County, North Carolina	Police responded to a mental health call in the Stacy area of a man breaking windows. A standoff occurred after Gaskill approached deputies holding two sais and barricaded himself. After several hours, deputies shot Gaskill.
2025-11-03	Brice Lajuan Edwards (49)	Black	Midwest City, Oklahoma	During a stolen vehicle pursuit, Midwest City officers performed a TVI on the stolen vehicle, causing it to crash. The suspect died.
2025-11-02	Jacob Allen (24)	White	Cedar Park, Texas	Police responded to calls of a stabbing at a karaoke bar. Officers located the suspect, who had fled on a motorcycle, and shot him after he allegedly brandished a handgun towards them.
2025-11-02	Mario Camacho (27)	Hispanic	Brandon, Florida	During a domestic violence investigation, Hillsborough County deputies encountered Camacho, who was choking his 7-year-old brother at knife-point while wearing a helmet. Deputies kicked down the barricaded door and then one-shot Camacho, who later died. The footage was released.
2025-11-02	David Evans (40)	Black	Salisbury, Maryland	SPD officers responded to the shooting and located the suspect, Evans, who was standing next to a vehicle with an object on its hood. Evans initially said the object wasn't loaded and reach for it, not following the officers' commands. The officers shot him afterward. One of the two shooting victims died from their injuries. The footage was released.
2025-11-02	Stanton McCamey Sembroski (49)	White	Denton, Texas	Police responded to a call that a man was shooting into unoccupied vehicles. Following a standoff, police fatally shot the man after he fired at them.
2025-11-01	Devon Fitch (30)	White	Elyria, Ohio	Police responded to reports of disturbances and assaults caused by a mentally unstable man, possibly under influence of drugs. When officers arrived to his room, he slammed the door shut with blood on his hands which led to a standoff. During which, police breached the door while the man resisted and armed himself with a shard of broken glass. They subsequently shot him with less-lethal weapons and restrained him in order to make the arrest. The man later died of the injuries.
2025-11-01	Junior Jean (48)	Unknown	Lower Paxton Township, Pennsylvania	Police responded to a call that a woman had been stabbed. Officers located Jean, her husband, and shot him after he allegedly approached police with the knife raised.

== See also ==
- Death in custody § United States
- Henry A. Wallace Police Crime Public Database
- List of cases of police brutality
- List of countries with annual rates and counts for killings by law enforcement officers
- List of law enforcement officers killed in the line of duty in the United States
- List of law enforcement officers convicted for an on-duty killing in the United States
- List of shootings by US immigration agents
- List of police reforms related to the George Floyd protests
- List of unarmed African Americans killed by law enforcement officers in the United States
- Lists of killings by law enforcement officers
- Police brutality in the United States
- Police misconduct § United States
- Police riot § United States
- Police use of deadly force in the United States
