= Keeton (surname) =

Keeton is an English surname. Notable people with the surname include:

- Bob Keeton (1918–1996), English footballer
- Cheryl Keeton (1949–1986), American lawyer
- Chuckie Keeton (born 1993), American football player
- Durwood Keeton (born 1952), American football player
- Elmer Keeton (1882–1947), American musician, community leader
- Frederick Keeton (1855–1911), English cricketer
- Haydn Keeton (1847–1921), American football player
- John Keeton (born 1972), British boxer
- Kathy Keeton (1939–1997), American magazine publisher
- Kimberly Keeton, American computer scientist
- Rickey Keeton (born 1957), American baseball player
- Robert Keeton (1919–2007), American lawyer
- Ruth U. Keeton (1919–1997), American politician
- W. Page Keeton (1909–1999), American attorney
- Walter Keeton (1905–1980), English cricketer
- William Keeton (1933–1980), American zoologist
- William D. Keeton (1884–1972), Justice of the Idaho Supreme Court

== See also ==
- Carole Keeton Strayhorn (born 1939), American politician
- Peter Keeton Leisure (1929–2013), American politician
- Keaton (name), given name and surname
