= 2012 East Bernstadt tornado =

Fatal EF2 Tornado in Kentucky

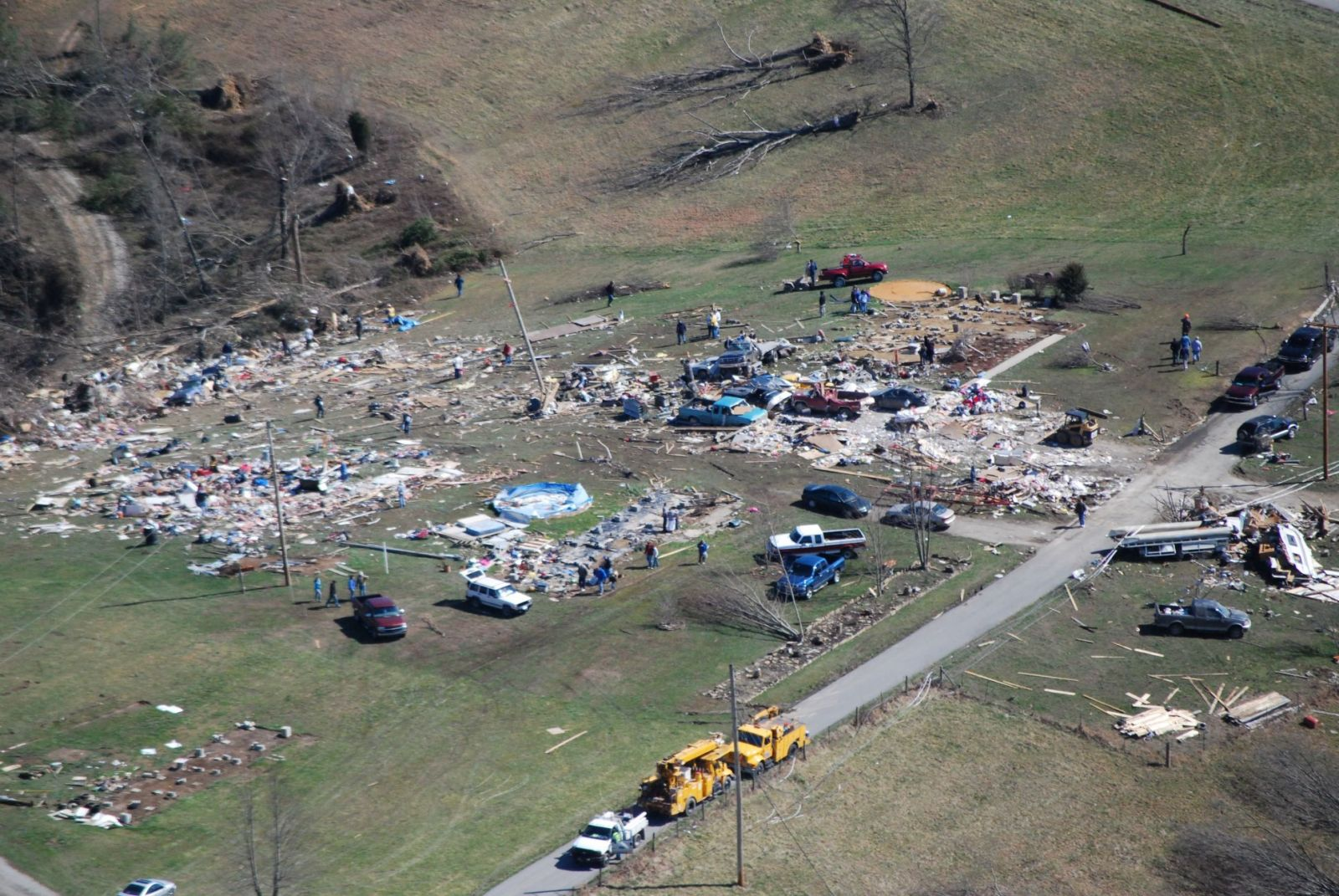
- Clockwise from top: The East Bernstadt tornado, as seen near the communities of East Bernstadt and Hare; the appearance of the storm system just before producing the East Bernstadt tornado; significant damage at a mobile home site in East Bernstadt; radar evolution of the storm system that produced the tornado.

Meteorological history
- Formed: March 2, 2012, 7:04 p.m. EST (UTC–05:00)
- Dissipated: March 2, 2012, 7:12 p.m. EST (UTC–05:00)
- Duration: 8 minutes

EF2 tornado
- on the Enhanced Fujita scale
- Max width: 310 yd (280 m)
- Path length: 7.15 mi (11.51 km)
- Highest winds: 125 mph (201 km/h)

Overall effects
- Fatalities: 6
- Injuries: 40
- Damage: $5 million (2012 USD)
- Areas affected: Laurel County, Kentucky, specifically East Bernstadt, Kentucky
- Part of the Tornadoes of 2012 and Tornado outbreak of March 2-3, 2012

In the evening hours of March 2, 2012, during a widespread and deadly tornado outbreak in the Ohio Valley region, a short-lived yet fatal EF2 tornado struck portions of Laurel County, Kentucky, notably in the East Bernstadt area to the north of London. This tornado caused significant damage, with estimated winds of up to 125 mph (201 km/h). The storm produced a damage path approximately 7.15 miles (11.51 km) long and 310 yd (280 m) wide at its largest. Six fatalities were attributed to this event, every single one of which occurred in a mobile home. Forty people were injured by the tornado. It has been stressed various times by weather officials that mobile homes are a poor choice of shelter during tornadoes, proving to be highly fatal.

Besides damage to mobile homes, severe damage was inflicted on multiple framed homes, trees were uprooted and felled, and outbuildings were collapsed or in some cases entirely swept. A scar, visible on satellite imagery from after the event, was carved into the ground. Damages amounted to around $5 million (2012 USD).

== Meteorological synopsis ==
=== Forecasting in advance ===
In late February, the possibility of significant severe weather on March 2–3, 2012 began to materialize. A day 2 MDT (moderate) risk for severe weather was issued by the Storm Prediction Center (SPC) on March 1, 2012, for regions extending from west-central Ohio to northeastern Mississippi, with a 45% hatched probability for severe weather being issued within this outlook. Weather officials noted the presence of a large mid and upper-level trough that overspread the region, containing a belt of extreme southwesterly flow. In addition to this, a deep surface low, which was forecasted to rapidly shift northeastward with an accompanying warm front to the east and a cold front to the south, was also observed. With this surface low, severe thunderstorms (some rotating), mixed-layer CAPE (MLCAPE) values of 1000-2000 J kg⁻¹, continued advection of steep lapse rates into the mid-lower Mississippi Valley region, extreme shear and thermodynamic profiles, and large hail were expected.

SPC probabilistic outlooks on March 2, 2012.

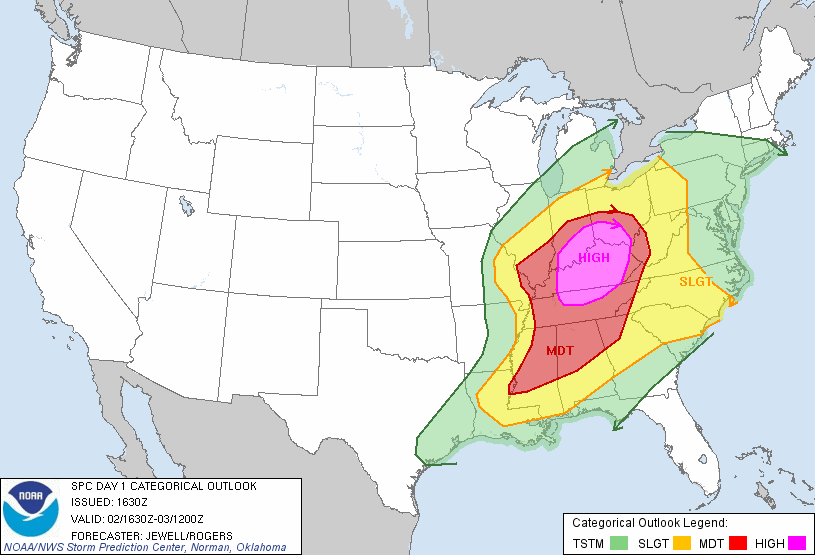
Day 1 1630z categorical outlook.

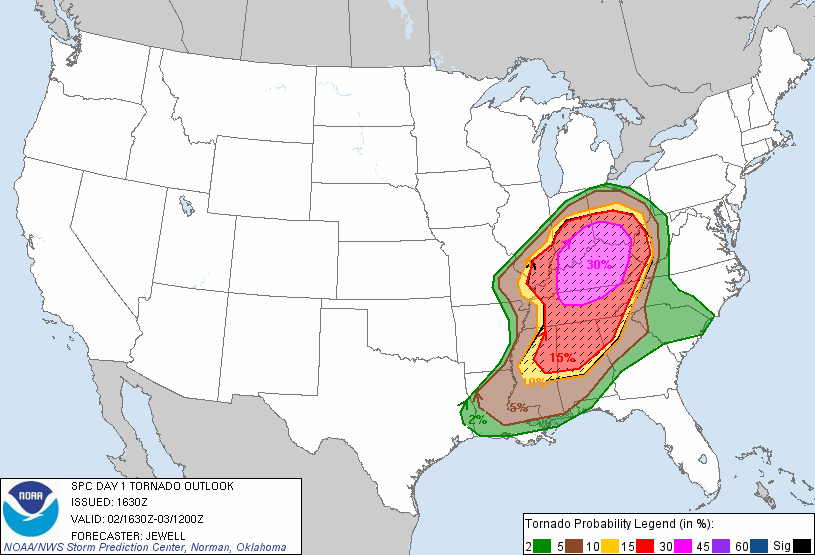
Day 1 1630z tornado outlook.

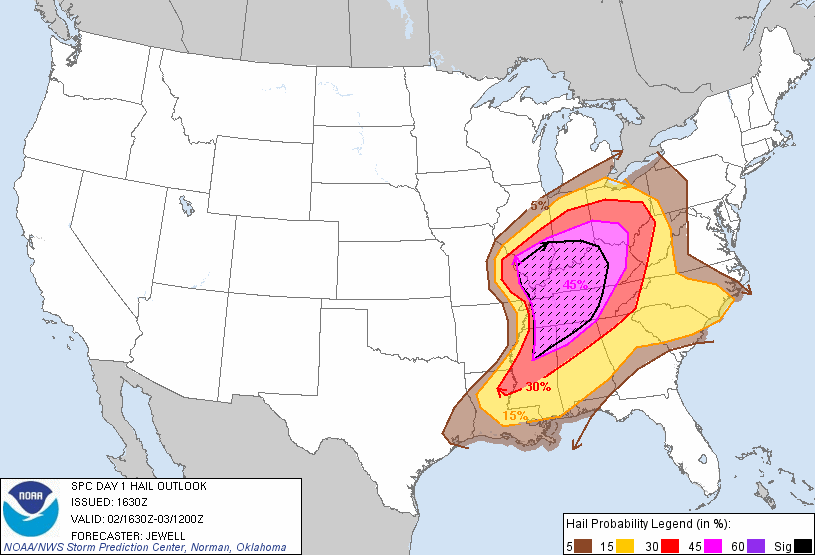
Day 1 1630z hail outlook.

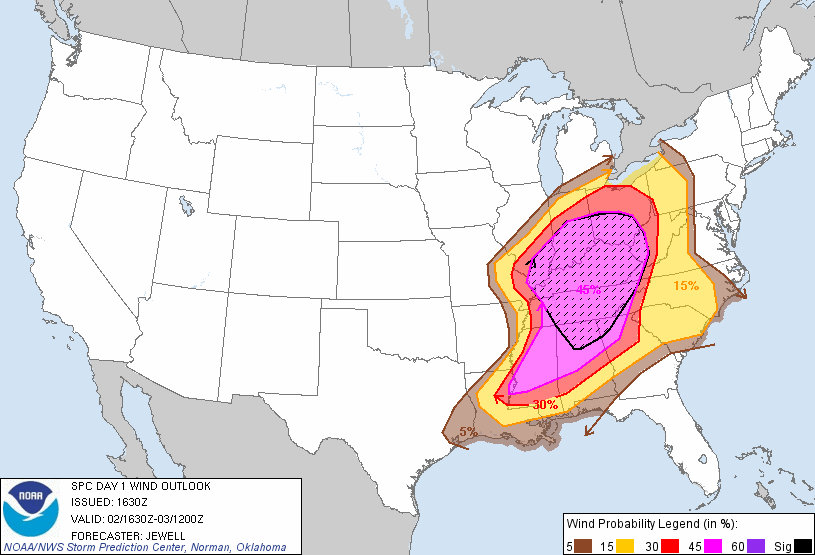
Day 1 1630z severe wind outlook.

=== Initiation of storms ===
By 1630, UTC (11:30 a.m. EST) March 2, 2012, the forecasted parameters for severe weather had remained fundamentally the same, with a 30% hatched risk for significant (EF2+) tornadoes being issued in the Ohio Valley region, encompassing the states of Ohio, Indiana, Tennessee, and Kentucky. By the time this outlook was issued, the aforementioned mid and upper-level trough, now with a well-defined vorticity center, had positioned itself over northern Missouri, and was expected to continue east into the Ohio River Valley in the next few hours. This highly sheared trough was projected to overspread a very large warm sector in the region, creating the potential for severe weather. Extreme levels of moisture and initiation off a trailing cold front (or prefrontal boundaries) were also expected to contribute to the development of storms and tornadoes.

== Tornado summary ==
The East Bernstadt tornado officially made contact with the ground at 7:04 p.m. EST March 2, 2012 (0004 UTC March 3), approximately 5 miles to the west of East Bernstadt. Moving at a pace exceeding 50 MPH, the tornado collapsed and completely destroyed multiple outbuildings, denuded and felled trees, and wiped out multiple mobile homes west of Interstate 75. Moving northeastward, it then crossed the interstate and impacted East Bernstadt, Kentucky — more specifically Hare, an unincorporated hamlet in East Bernstadt. Here, extensive damage occurred, as frame homes were unroofed and partially collapsed (in some cases even swept), trees were uprooted and lofted, and multiple mobile and trailer homes were completely destroyed, with debris windrowed and only mounting blocks remaining at the sites of the mobile homes. Due to this damage (particularly the complete sweeping of mobile homes, with only undercarriages remaining, as well as the collapse and sweeping of frame homes), surveyors assigned a windspeed estimate of 125 MPH to the East Bernstadt tornado, which correlates to a high-end EF2 rating. Near one of the mobile home damage sites in East Bernstadt, an RV dealership and multiple metal-frame buildings were also severely impacted. In multiple areas, shredded insulation was found plastered against bare trees, metal and wood frames were strewn, and acres of trees were downed in the direction of the tornado's core.

The tornado dissipated at 7:12 p.m. EST, south of Victory, Kentucky, having traveled a distance of 7.15 miles (11.51 km) in eight minutes. Costs of damage from the tornado amounted to $5 million (2012 USD). Six fatalities were reported, all of which were in mobile homes, and multiple individuals were displaced after their homes were destroyed by the tornado or were deemed beyond repair.

NWS damage photos from the East Bernstadt tornado.

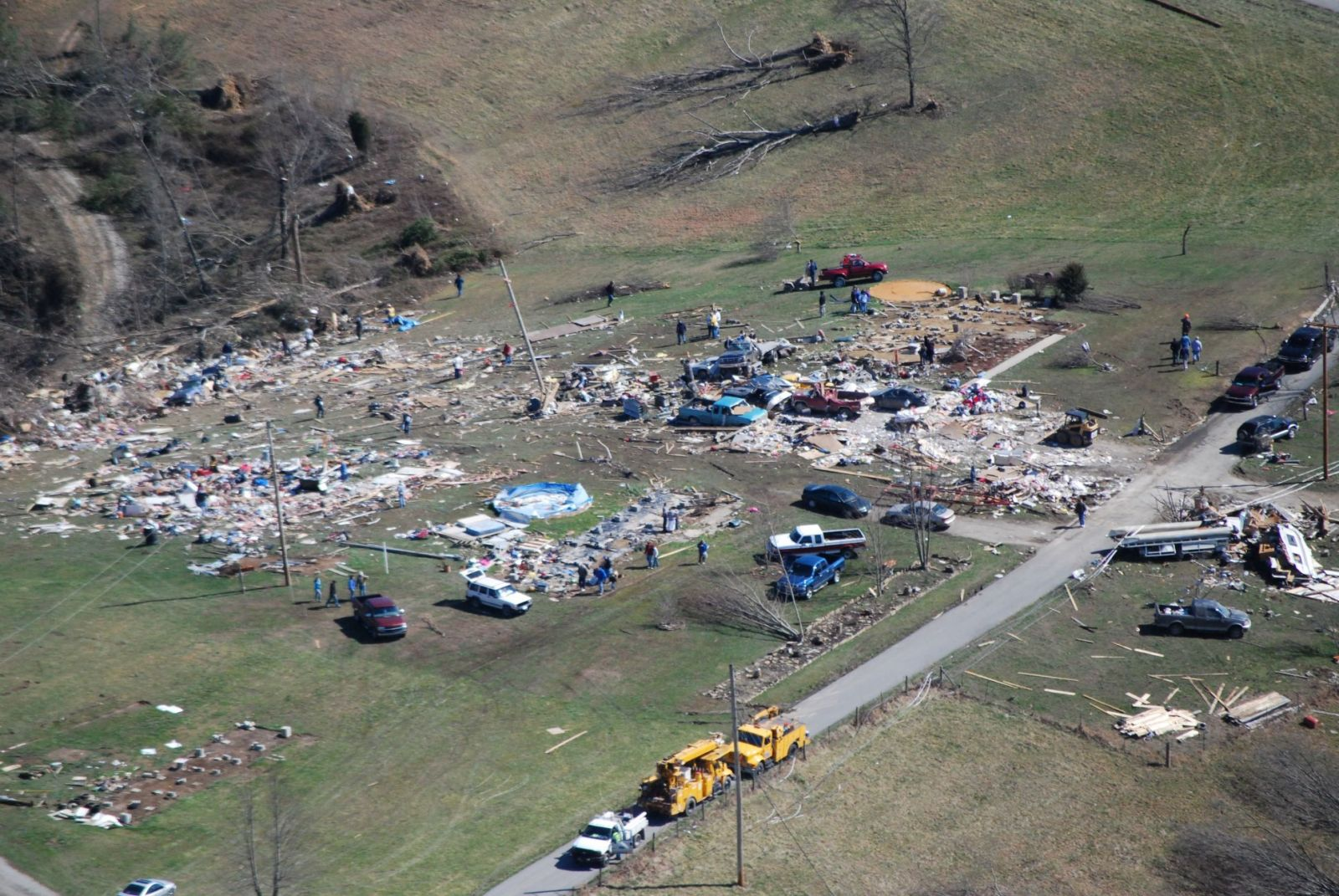
Significant damage to a mobile home site in the East Bernstadt-Hare region.

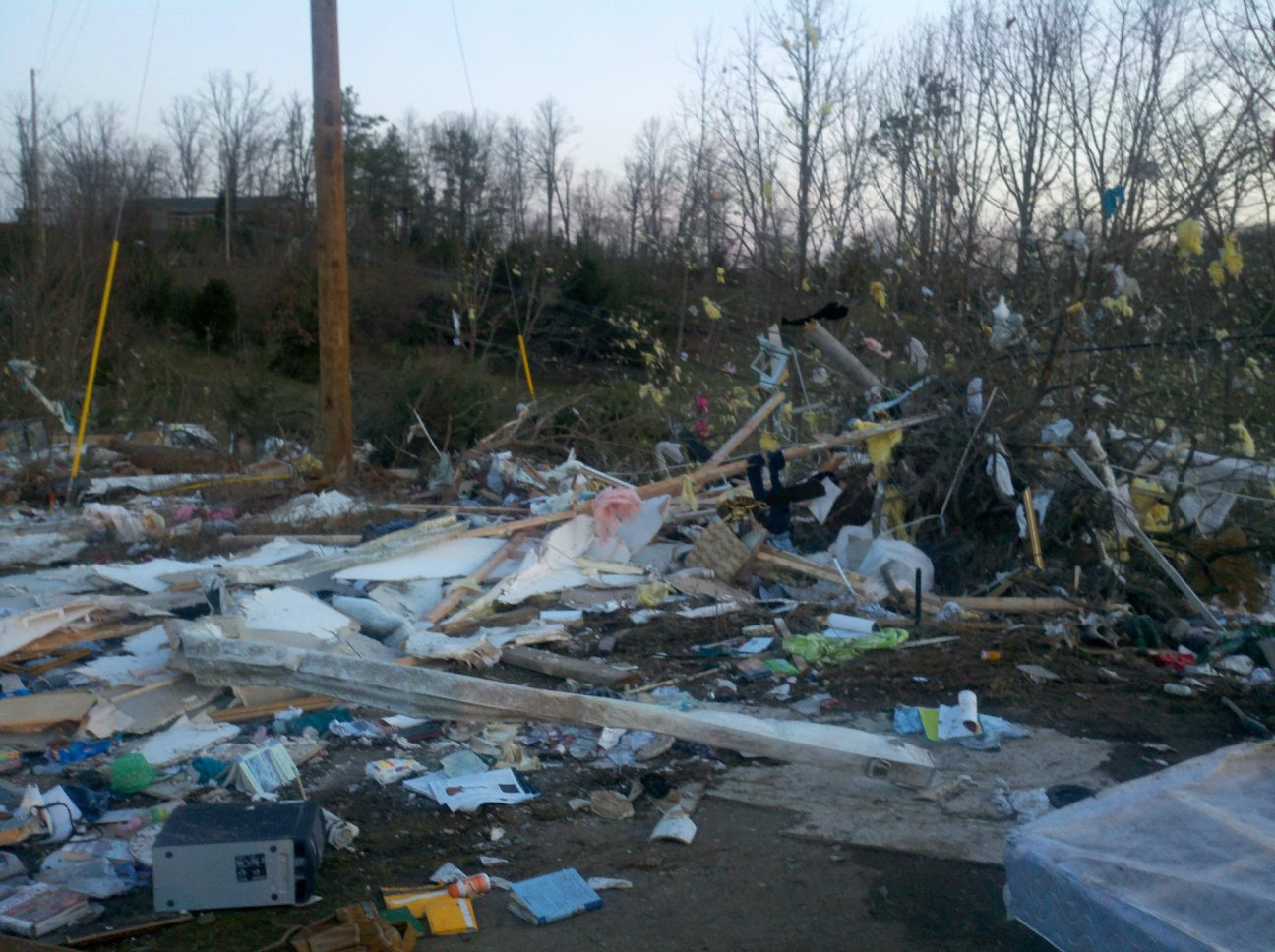
Severe damage west of I-75.

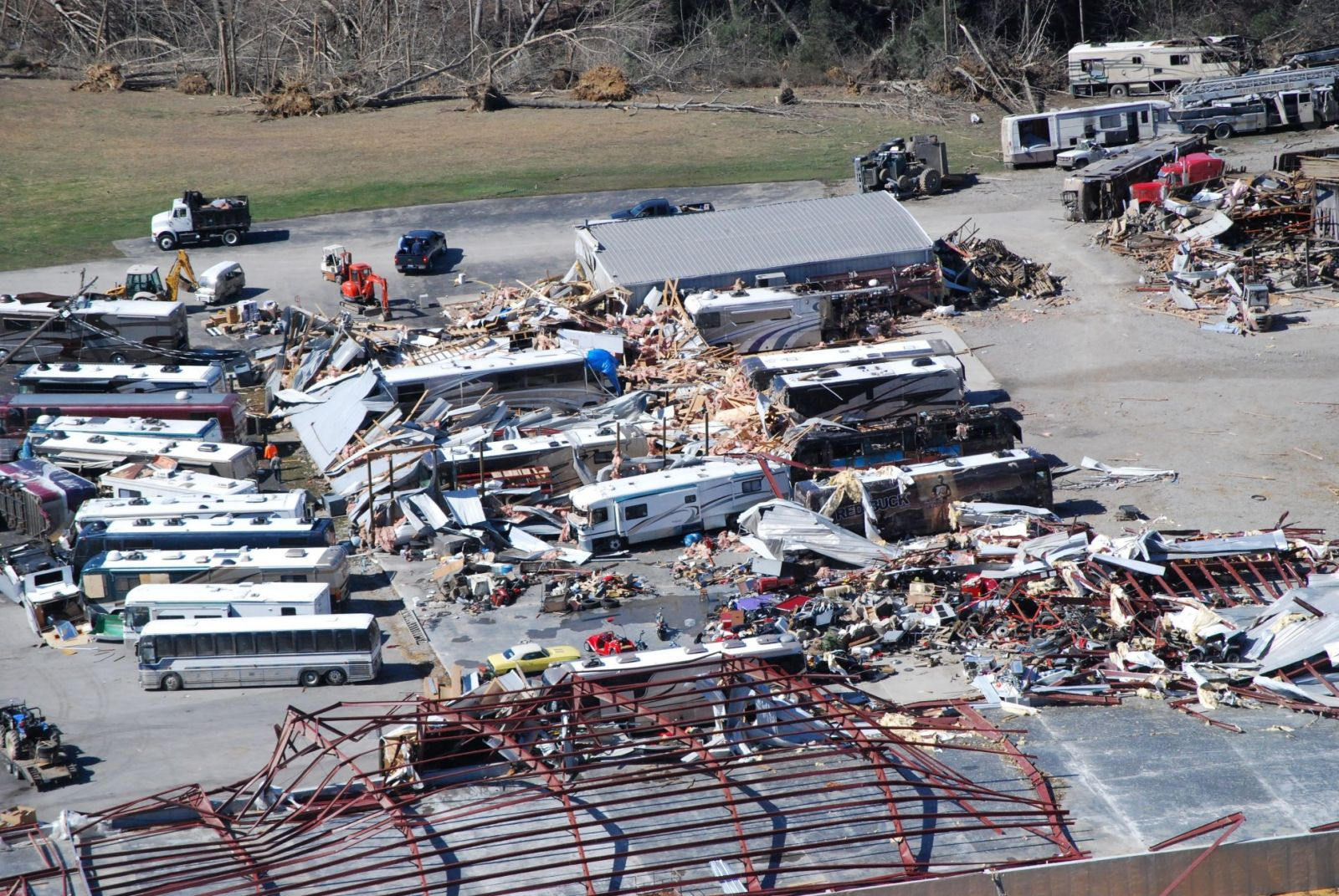
Damage to an RV site in East Bernstadt.

== Aftermath ==
=== Statistics ===
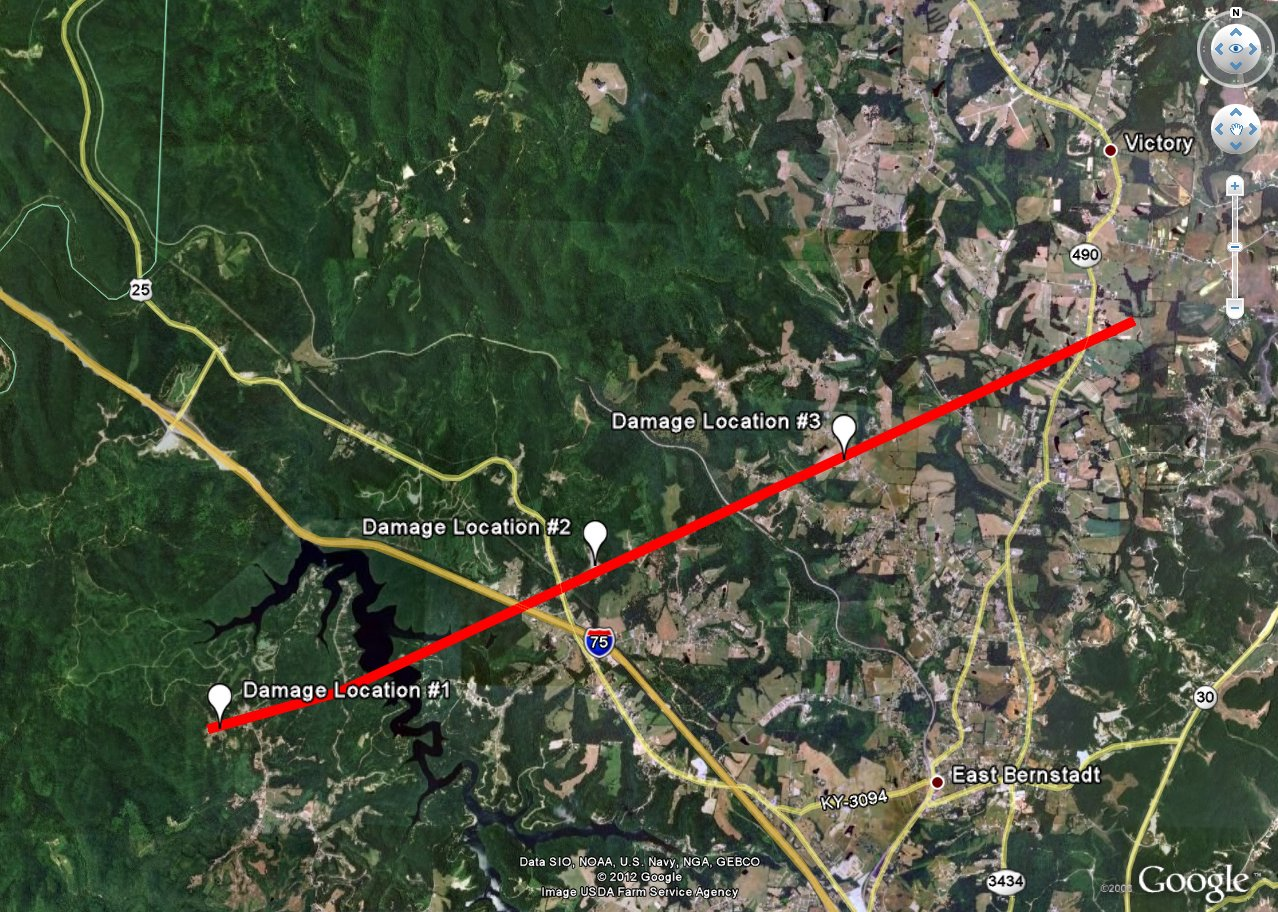
A reconstructed path of the East Bernstadt tornado.

The East Bernstadt, Kentucky tornado was the third most fatal tornado of the March 2–3, 2012 outbreak sequence, with six direct deaths — only behind the EF3 tornado that struck West Liberty, Kentucky (10 deaths, +1 indirect), and the EF4 tornado which impacted Henryville, Indiana (at least 11 deaths) hours earlier. All fatalities attributed to the East Bernstadt tornado were in mobile homes, structures which are notorious for having disproportionately high fatality rates in tornadoes. Since the East Bernstadt tornado, significant advancements in tornado safety have been made, including the propagation of the fact that mobile homes and trailer homes are poor places to shelter in tornadoes. For those who live in a mobile home, the National Weather Service (NWS) advises having a proper evacuation plan in the case of a tornado warning. Options for appropriate shelter include community shelters and frame homes, preferably with a basement or with a fully interior room on the first floor of the home.

=== Legacy ===
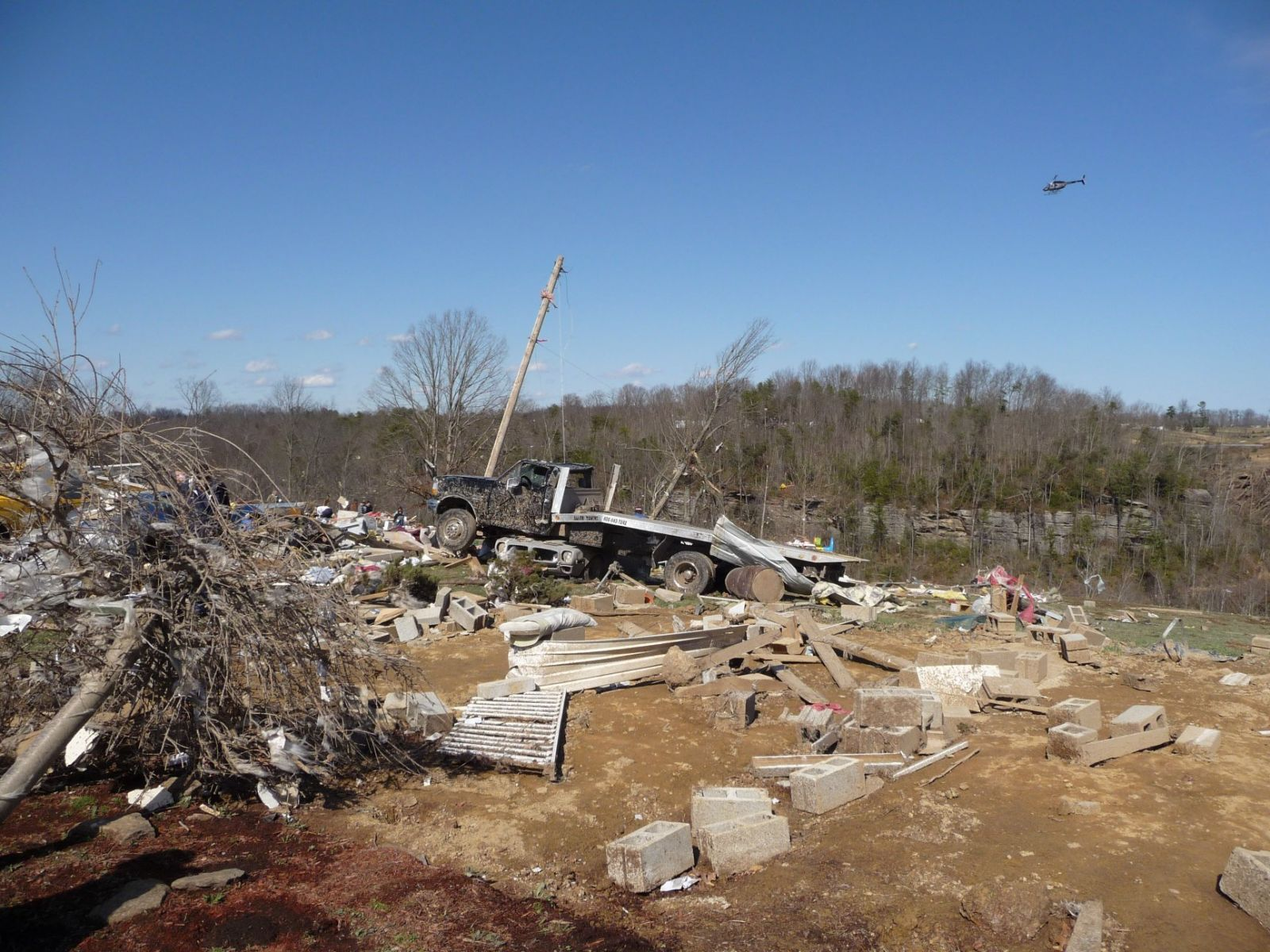
A home destroyed in East Bernstadt.

After the tornado, the East Bernstadt Baptist Church was repurposed as a food and clothing store for those affected by the tornado, and the United Way also repurposed a store off of KY-490 in East Bernstadt as a food and clothing distribution center. A memorial within the community of East Bernstadt was created behind the East Bernstadt Fire Department, in remembrance of the lives lost in the tornado. Besides this memorial, no other significant scars (albeit psychological) from the tornado remain. Multiple witnesses described the characteristic "freight train" sound associated with the tornado as it passed over their homes. As with tornadoes of this nature, witnesses also mentioned that the devastation of the East Bernstadt tornado had a "unifying" effect, allowing for the town to "look out for each other" more and share in their suffering.

Many people within the area, specifically from the nearby city of London, came to the aid of the victims of the East Bernstadt tornado. Since then, the community has made a complete recovery.

== Laurel County tornado history ==
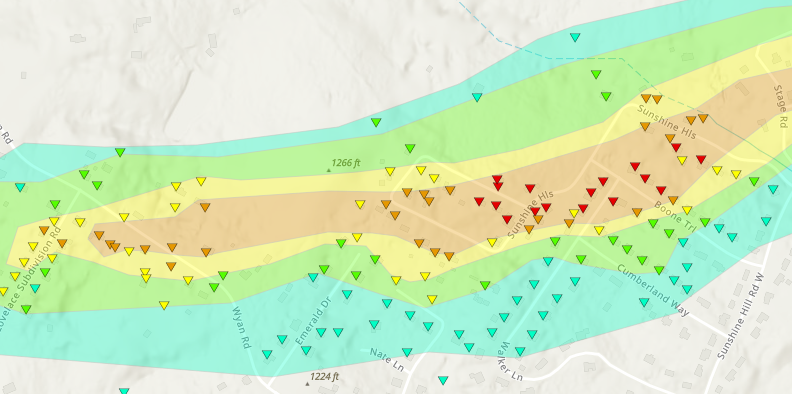
Path of the Somerset-London tornado through the Sunshine Hills subdivision

On May 16, 2025, a large and violent EF4 tornado impacted the communities of Somerset and London, across Pulaski and Laurel Counties. This tornado tracked considerably close to where the East Bernstadt tornado had struck in 2012. The EF4 tornado obliterated and splintered acres of forested land in the Daniel Boone National Forest, produced devastating damage in multiple subdivisions in London (particularly the Sunshine Hills subdivision), and caused 18 fatalities along a 60.08-mile path. This tornado was one of the most devastating to impact the region in years, and echoed the destruction that the East Bernstadt tornado had caused 13 years prior.

== See also ==
- Tornado outbreak of March 2–3, 2012
- 2012 West Liberty tornado – A long-lived and fatal EF3 tornado across eastern Kentucky and western West Virginia
- 2012 Henryville tornado – A long-track and deadly EF4 tornado in southern Indiana during the same outbreak
- 2012 Crittenden–Piner tornado – A short-lived, but destructive and lethal EF4 tornado in northern Kentucky on the same day
- 2025 Somerset–London tornado – A large and violent EF4 tornado that tracked across parts of the Cumberland Plateau and devastated the nearby city of London, Kentucky 13 years later
- 2005 Evansville tornado – Another deadly tornado, rated F3 on the Fujita scale, that struck Evansville, Indiana; an extremely high concentration of fatalities occurred in mobile homes, underlining the importance of taking proper shelter in tornadoes
