= Keaton (name) =

Keaton (/ˈkiːtən/) is an English surname derived from various place names (Caton, Keaton, Keeton, Kiveton, Ketton); less commonly used as a given name despite the given name is more common in North America, also spelled Keatyn or Keatin.

== People ==
=== Given name ===
- Keaton Bills (born 1998), American football player
- Keaton Ellerby (born 1988), Canadian professional ice hockey player
- Keaton Henson (born 1988), English folk rock musician
- Keaton Isaksson (born 1994), Finnish professional footballer
- Keaton Jennings (born 1992), South African-born English cricketer
- Keaton Kristick (born 1988), American football linebacker
- Keaton McCargo (born 1995), American freestyle skier
- Keaton Mitchell (born 2002), American football player
- Keaton Nankivil (born 1989), American basketball player
- Keaton Nigel Cooke, American film actor, television actor, and singer
- Keaton Parks (born 1997), American professional soccer player
- Keaton Simons (born 1978), American recording and performing artist
- Keaton Stromberg, former member of Emblem3
- Keaton Sutherland (born 1997), American football player
- Keaton Verhoeff (born 2008), Canadian ice hockey player
- Keaton Wagler (born 2007), American basketball player
- Keaton Winn (born 1998), American baseball pitcher
- Keaton Yamada (born 1945), Japanese actor

=== Surname ===
- Ben Keaton (1956–2026), Irish actor
- Camille Keaton (born 1947), American actress
- David Keaton (died 2015), member of the Quincy Five group convicted of killing a sheriff
- Diane Keaton (1946–2025), American actress
- Joe Keaton (1867–1946), American vaudeville performer and silent film actor
  - Myra Keaton (1877–1955), American vaudeville performer and silent film actress, wife of Joe and mother of Buster
  - Buster Keaton (1895–1966), American actor and son of Joe
- Jonathan D. Keaton (born 1946), American clergyman
- Josh Keaton (born 1979), American actor
- Michael Keaton (born 1951), American actor

== Fictional ==
- Alex P. Keaton, character on Family Ties
- Taichi Keaton, title character of the Master Keaton series of novels
- Keaton, a race of fox-like creatures in The Legend of Zelda

== See also ==
- Keeton (surname)
