= Bob Keeton =

English footballer

Personal information
- Full name: Albert Keeton
- Date of birth: 15 January 1918
- Place of birth: Chesterfield, England
- Date of death: January 1996 (aged 77–78)
- Place of death: Torbay, Devon, England
- Position: Full back

Youth career
- Mosborough Trinity

Senior career*
| Years | Team | Apps | (Gls) |
| 1937–1948 | Torquay United | 77 | (0) |
- Yeovil Town
- * Club domestic league appearances and goals

Albert "Bob" Keeton (15 January 1918 – January 1996) was an English professional footballer.

Keeton, a Chesterfield-born right-back, began his football career with Gainsborough Trinity, later joining Mosborough Trinity. In June 1937 he joined Torquay United, making his debut in a 1–0 win at home to Swindon Town on 26 February 1938. He lost his place to his former Mosborough teammate Freddie Green after playing the next game, a 1–0 defeat away to Aldershot, but after missing just one game re-emerged as a left-back, replacing Ernie Stokes. He finished his first season as a professional having made 11 league appearances and began the following season as the regular left-back. However, after playing the first 13 league games, he lost his place and was to only make a further 3 first-team appearances that season.

His career was interrupted by World War II, but when league football resumed he was still with Torquay and was the regular right-back in Torquay's 1946-47 side. He left Torquay in 1948, having made 77 league appearances, and joined non-league Yeovil Town. In 1949 he was part of the famous Yeovil side that reached the 5th round of the FA Cup, beating then giants Sunderland, including England star Len Shackleton, who Keeton kept quiet throughout the game, in the 4th round.

Keeton later worked as a commercial traveller in Torquay, and died of cancer in Torquay in January 1996.
