= Keaton, Kentucky =

Unincorporated community in Kentucky, United States

- Unincorporated community
- Location within Kentucky Location within the United States
- Coordinates: 37°59′08″N 82°57′37″W
- Country: United States
- State: Kentucky
- County: Johnson
- Elevation: 775 ft (236 m)
- Time zone: UTC-5 (Eastern (EST))
  - Summer (DST): UTC-4 (EDT)
- ZIP codes: 41226
- GNIS feature ID: 509986

Keaton is an unincorporated community in Johnson County, Kentucky, United States. The community's first post office was established on May 17, 1900, with Sarah A Holbrook as the postmaster and it was named after the local Keaton family. Keaton's ZIP code is 41226.

Keaton is located at an elevation of 775 feet (227 m).
