= 2012 Woodward tornado =

Tornado that hit Woodward, Oklahoma in 2012

- Counterclockwise from top: The tornado seen at peak intensity just outside Woodward; Velocity radar imagery of the tornado throughout its lifespan; Damage to several homes in Woodward.

Meteorological history
- Formed: April 14, 2012, 11:42 p.m CDT (UTC−05:00)
- Dissipated: April 15, 2012, 12:27 a.m CDT (UTC−05:00)
- Duration: 25 minutes

EF3 tornado
- on the Enhanced Fujita scale
- Max width: 400 yards (0.23 mi; 0.37 km)
- Path length: 19 miles (31 km)
- Highest winds: 165 mph (266 km/h)

Overall effects
- Fatalities: 6
- Injuries: 29
- Damage: $26 million (2012 USD)
- Areas affected: Ellis County, Oklahoma and Woodward County, Oklahoma; particularly Woodward
- Part of the Tornado outbreak of April 13–16, 2012 and Tornadoes of 2012

During the overnight hours of April 14–15, 2012, a destructive and deadly EF3 tornado would strike the Oklahoma counties of Ellis and Woodward, particularly the towns of Arnett and Woodward, destroying numerous homes, killing six people and injuring 29 others along its 19 mile long and up to 400-yard-wide path. The tornado was the second strongest and only fatal tornado during a major three-day tornado outbreak that lasted from April 13th to April 16th and was the strongest to hit Woodward since an F5 tornado that killed 107 people in the town on April 9, 1947.

The tornado, commonly referred to as the 2012 Woodward tornado or the Arnett-Woodward tornado, touched three miles to the northeast of Arnett, intensifying to EF2 to EF3 strength as it destroyed several wood-framed homes in the sparsely populated regions nearby. The tornado continued to cause intense damage as it crossed into Woodward County, destroying two mobile homes and inflicting its first two fatalities before entering southwestern Woodward, where the tornado destroyed numerous homes and businesses, including a movie theater, a large Carpet Direct store and a Mutual Of Omaha Customer Support Center. The tornado then struck the Hideaway Mobile Home Park where another four fatalities occurred as numerous mobile homes were shredded. The tornado then rapidly began to weaken as it left town before dissipating four miles to the northeast, having travelled for over 25 minutes.

== Meteorological synopsis ==
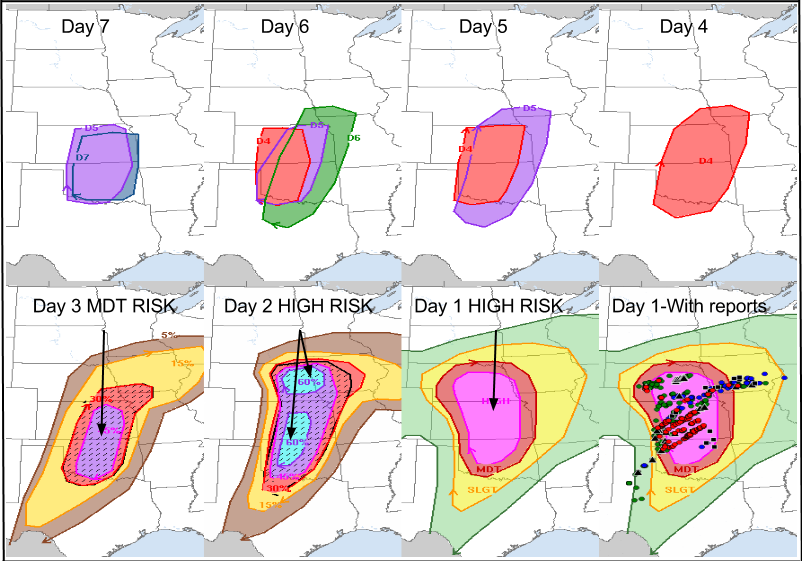
Evolution of SPC forecasts leading up to April 14, 2012

In the days before April 14th, a strong dryline and a large low-pressure area had developed across western Kansas and Oklahoma. A strong upper-level low had also developed that further increased the potential for severe weather in the region. Cape values of up to 3000 J/KG began to develop across the front, while simultaneously wind shear drastically increased as relative helicities of 400 M2/S2 prompted the Storm Prediction Center, at 0600 UTC to issue a day-two high risk for central Kansas and Oklahoma (which is the most recent time a day two high risk has been issued at 0600 UTC and was the first time a day-two high risk had happened in over 6 years), with a 45% chance of tornadoes and potential for an outbreak of multiple long-tracked, strong-to-violent tornadoes being noted. Strong heating occurred throughout much of the day contributing to the instability in the region.

At around 2:30 p.m. the first supercells of the day would begin to fire, with the first report of a tornado occurring at 4:00 p.m. A thunderstorm that had formed ahead of a nearby squall line began to rapidly intensify at around 11:30 p.m., dropping the Woodward tornado 12 minutes later.

== Tornado summary ==
Reflectivity radar imagery of the tornado throughout its lifespan.

The tornado touched down three miles to the northeast of Arnett, traveling through sparsely populated rural regions as it continued on its northeastern track before rapidly intensifying to EF3 strength as several homes suffered severe damage to their exterior walls and roofs, including two that were completely destroyed. The tornado would then slightly weaken as it crossed northwestward into Woodward County, snapping power lines and destroying two mobile homes at EF2 intensity to the southeast of Fargo, resulting in two fatalities.

Peak high-end EF3 damage to a home in Woodward.

The tornado then entered southwestern Woodward at high-end EF3 intensity, destroying numerous homes on Meadowlake Drive with only small interior rooms and walls remaining and snapping nearby trees. The tornado weakened slightly to low-end EF3 intensity on Quail Drive as a poorly built home was completely destroyed with nearby homes suffering roof and exterior wall damage before reaching peak intensity on Willowwest Drive as a well-built home was completely destroyed at high-end EF3 intensity, though surrounding contextual damage was not supportive of a rating higher than EF3. The tornado then weakened back to EF2 intensity on Robin Drive as three homes suffered severe damage to their roof structures and nearby homes suffered moderate damage to their roofs and exterior walls as well. The tornado then re-intensified to low-end EF3 intensity on Lakeside Lane as a home had its exterior walls completely collapsed inwards and multiple condominiums around it suffered similar EF3 intensity damage to their roof structures and exterior walls, including a poorly anchored one-story condominium that completely collapsed and was partially swept from its foundation. A nearby 10,000-foot Carpet Direct store on 34th street was completely destroyed with its exterior walls collapsed and its metal support beams bent and nearby cars were flipped and thrown, including a large truck that was thrown into the ruins of the Carpet Direct, while the nearby Lakeside Theatre suffered severe damage as nearly half of the building was completely destroyed and its entire roof structure was ripped off.

The tornado continued to the northeast at EF3 intensity as trees were snapped, metal signs were bent to the ground and the Mutual of Omaha Customer Service Center was struck at low-end EF3 intensity, with exterior walls collapsing, the roof structure failing, and nearby decorative trees being debarked and defoliated. Crossing U.S. Route 183 to the northeast, the tornado would maintain EF2 to EF3 intensity as it continued to rip off roofs and collapse or completely destroy the exterior walls of multiple wood-framed homes throughout western Woodward. The tornado then struck the Hideaway Mobile Home Park, resulting in four fatalities as dozens of mobile homes were completely destroyed, including several that were thrown with their metal frames completely mangled. Ground scouring and debarking and uprooting of trees also occurred in the area, with mud coating the scattered debris. The tornado then began to rapidly weaken with no further damage noted as it exited Woodward, dissipating 4 miles to the northeast.

== Aftermath ==
=== Damage and fatalities ===
An American flag flies from a home damaged by the tornado.

Over $26 million in damages was inflicted along the tornados 34-mile-long path, including 73 homes that suffered significant damage and another 19 that were completely destroyed. An additional 9 businesses suffered severe damage, with 2 others suffering minor damage as well. Additionally, over 8,507 Oklahoma Gas & Electric customers in Woodward were reported to have lost power as a result of the tornado and preceding storms. Six fatalities occurred, all of which were outside or in mobile homes, including 3 children. One Vietnam War veteran, Steve Peil, was mortally wounded and later died in an Amarillo, Texas hospital. His funeral was held on April 19th, with a funeral procession lead by organizations such as the Legacy Vets Motorcycle Club and the Brotherhood Aiming Towards Education. The procession stretched for several miles and was attended by over 300 riders on motorcycles from multiple states, many of which were fellow Vietnam veterans. Faith Dean and Kelly Marie, two children that were killed in the same mobile home park, were given heart-shaped graves and many gifts were left for them including a Tinkerbell wallet and figurine of Ariel from The Little Mermaid. Some survivors of the previous 1947 Woodward Tornado were also impacted by this tornado as well, including Wilma Nelson, a 65-year-old woman who was struck in the head by a large piece of drywall after her home suffered significant damage to its roof and some exterior walls. She was later interviewed by local news stations.

List of fatalities caused by the tornado
| Name | Age | Location of death | Refs. |
|---|---|---|---|
| Faith Dean Hobbie | 7 | Hideaway Mobile Home Park | |
| Marie Hobbie | 4 | Hideaway Mobile Home Park | |
| Frank Hobbie | 24 | Hideaway Mobile Home Park | |
| Steve Peil | 63 | Hideaway Mobile Home Park | |
| Rose Marie Juul | 10 | Rural Ellis County | |
| Derrin Juul | 41 | Rural Ellis County | |

=== Recovery process and legacy ===
Governor Mary Fallin in front of a home that was severely damaged by the tornado.

Following the tornado, Oklahoma governor Mary Fallin declared a state of emergency for the 12 most impacted counties, including Ellis and Woodward County. After touring the damage and delivering a speech in which she offered her prayers to those affected, she requested federal disaster aid, which was denied. Following a statement in which Governor Fallin said that she was "Extremely disappointed" by the decision, she requested disaster aid from the U.S Small Business Administration, which was accepted, with interest on disaster loans being significantly lowered on large disaster loans to businesses, renters and homeowners who had been impacted by the tornado, with long-term aid for businesses that suffered from sustained economic damage.

First responders helped clean up debris and rescued people that were trapped by debris. Many volunteers from across the state arrived to aid in the cleanup and recovery process while the American Red Cross, which had received over 50,000 dollars in aid from the Woodward Regional Hospital, and the Salvation Army provided food, shelter and other supplies to those impacted. The Oklahoma Southern Baptist Men helped remove trees and debris as well as provided clothing, while the Living Word Fellowship Church provided food. The Oklahoma Medical Reserve Corps was deployed to provide free tetanus vaccines to these volunteers. Many other volunteers organized through social media outlets such as Facebook, where multiple accounts were created to organize relief efforts and resources. Following the immediate cleanup, the accounts moved on to platforming fundraisers for those affected and preparing for any similar events in the future. Around 800 five-gallon buckets containing resources for volunteer work, including trash bags, flashlights, shovels and rakes, as well as a miniature American flag, were handed out to volunteers and to homes near heavily damaged areas by city officials, along with over 1.500 meals for first responders and those affected.

The Lakeside Theatre was later purchased by Mitchell Theatres, a regional chain, being refurbished with six new digital screens. Country singer Larry Gatlin wrote the song "I Can Build Another House", which was inspired by the community's recovery from the tornado, and performed for free in the city of Woodward at the Crystal Beach Stadium. Near the trailer park, where the majority of fatalities occurred, a new storm shelter was installed, while many other citizens of Woodward installed new tornado shelters, especially those whose homes had been damaged or destroyed by the tornado. In 2013, citizens from across town met to commemorate the tornado's first anniversary, which was visited by Oklahoma Lieutenant Governor Todd Lamb. Later that year in May, the Woodward School Board voted to construct FEMA standard safe rooms in all schools under their jurisdiction. In 2022, a new monument to the victims of the tornado was set up outside of the Woodward Emergency Management Office located near the Crystal Beach Park, using an old siren that had been damaged by the tornado.

=== Prior warning and coverage ===
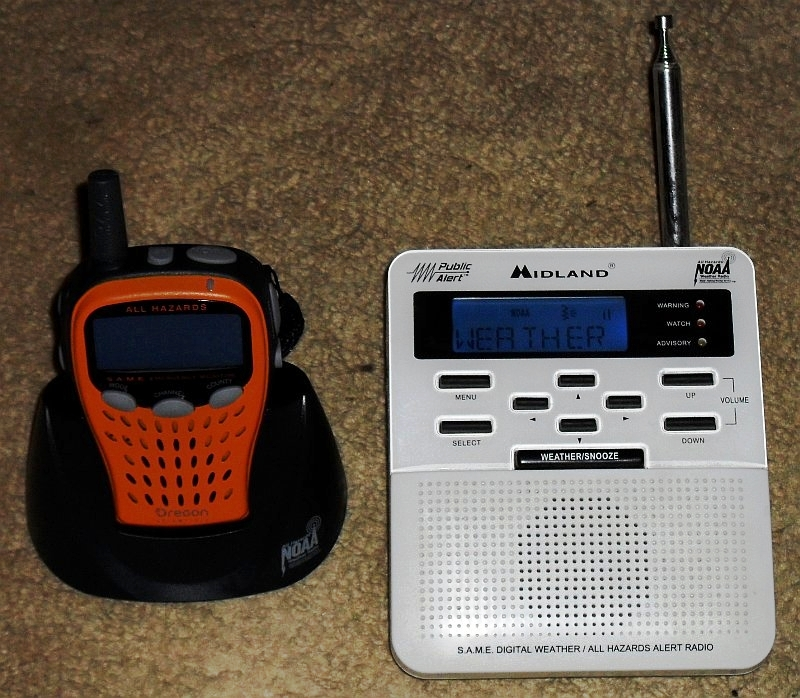
An NOAA All-Hazards Weather Radio, similar to the ones used in Woodward.

A lightning prior to the tornado caused damage to the communication tower, which was supposed to send a repeating signal to warning systems, to stop. This resulted in the failure of 20 tornado sirens, forcing many citizens to rely on NOAA Weather Radios. Additionally, many of the local stations had stopped reporting on the weather, with many storm spotters and reporters going home. This was likely influenced by the fact that Woodward had been placed under multiple tornado watches throughout the day, none of which produced significant or damaging tornadoes. A storm tracker for News 9, Marty Logan, was the only news chaser that was still reporting in the town of Woodward. During the tornado, he provided "life-saving" coverage, including the tornado's location and where it was tracking towards, and as a result was honored by members of the Oklahoma House and Senate, including Bryce Marlatt and Jeff Hickman, as well as the chief meteorologist for News 9, Gary England for his "heroic" coverage during the tornado, with other members of the House and Senate pausing to honor him as well. During the recovery process following the tornado, a fundraiser by local citizens and the Apache Oil Field Company donated over $350,000 to install 27 replacement sirens capable of operating during a similar outage.

Timeline of Watches and Warnings for the Woodward area
| Type | Notes | Time | Refs. |
|---|---|---|---|
| PDS Tornado Watch | None | 10:45 a.m. | |
| PDS Tornado Watch | None | 5:25 p.m. | |
| Severe Thunderstorm Warning | Destructive winds up to 70 mph and golf ball sized hail | 10:35 p.m. | |
| Severe Thunderstorm Warning | Destructive winds up to 70 mph, golf ball sized hail, possibility for tornadoes | 11:13 p.m. | |
| Severe Weather Statement | Destructive winds up to 70 mph and golf ball sized hail | 11:42 p.m. | |
| Tornado Warning | Trained weather spotters reported a tornado 7 miles southeast of Gage | 12:00 a.m. | |
| Severe Weather Statement | Tornado with a history of producing damage reported near Fargo | 12:08 a.m. | |
| Tornado Warning | Dangerous tornado with a history of producing damage | 12:16 a.m. | |
| Severe Weather Statement | Large dangerous tornado moving into Woodward | 12:20 a.m. | |
| Severe Weather Statement | Large dangerous tornado with a history of producing significant damage in Woodward | 12:33 a.m. | |

=== Insurance lawsuit ===
Woodward residents Jeff and Mary Sharpe, Linda and Kim Louthan, and Sterling Parks sued Farmers Insurance for violating Oklahoma's good faith insurance laws by not paying the amount needed to repair their homes and making false claims such as stating that Sterling Parks' home was structurally stable, despite the fact that an independent contractor found that it was structurally unstable and needed to be torn down. Following a six-day court case, District Judge Ray Dean Linder ruled in favor of the three Woodward families, suing Farmers for over $15 million dollars in damages, including $2 million for violating Oklahoma's good faith insurance laws, $3 million in punitive damages, as well as $49,278 to Sterling Parks, $224,202 to the Louthan family and $245,967 to the Sharpe Family.

== See also ==
- 2012 West Liberty Tornado - Another deadly EF3 that occurred in the year of 2012
- 2024 Sulphur tornado - Another nocturnal tornado that reached high-end EF3 intensity
- Tornadoes Of 2012
- Tornadoes in Oklahoma
