= Tornadoes of 2012 =

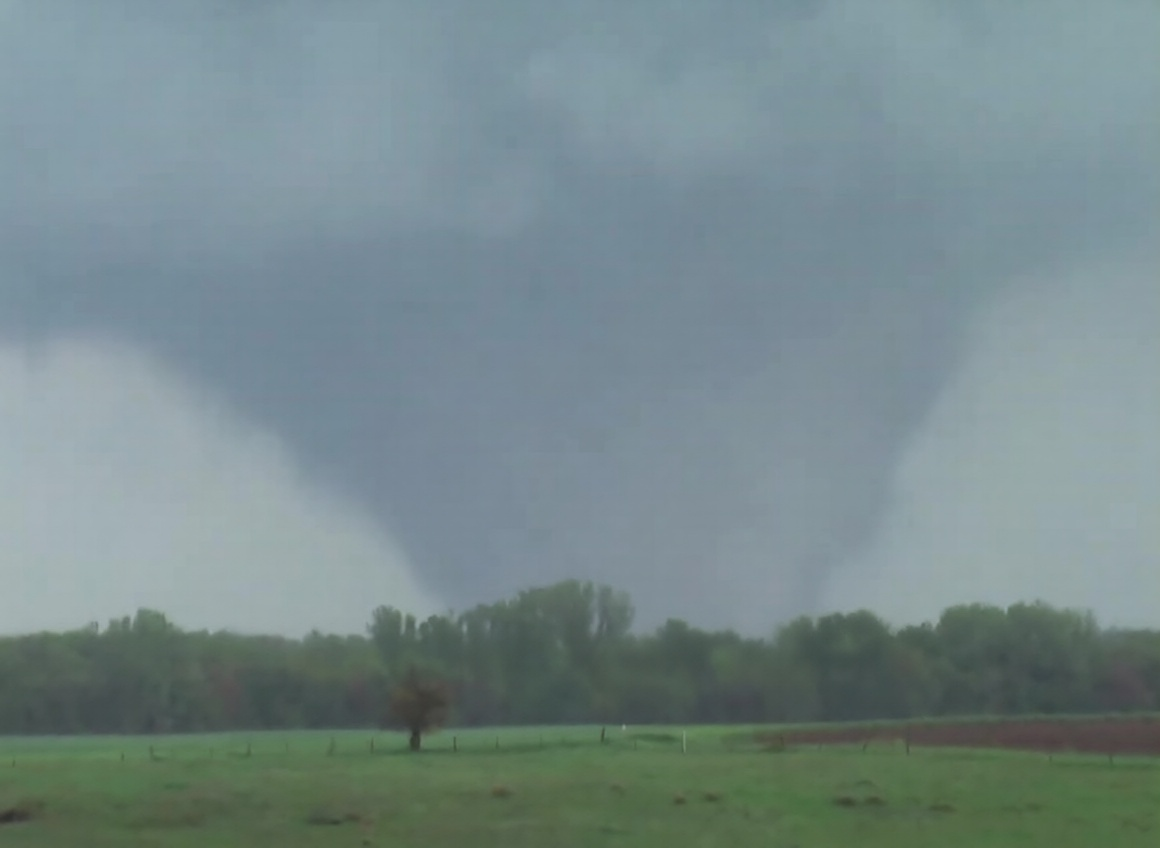
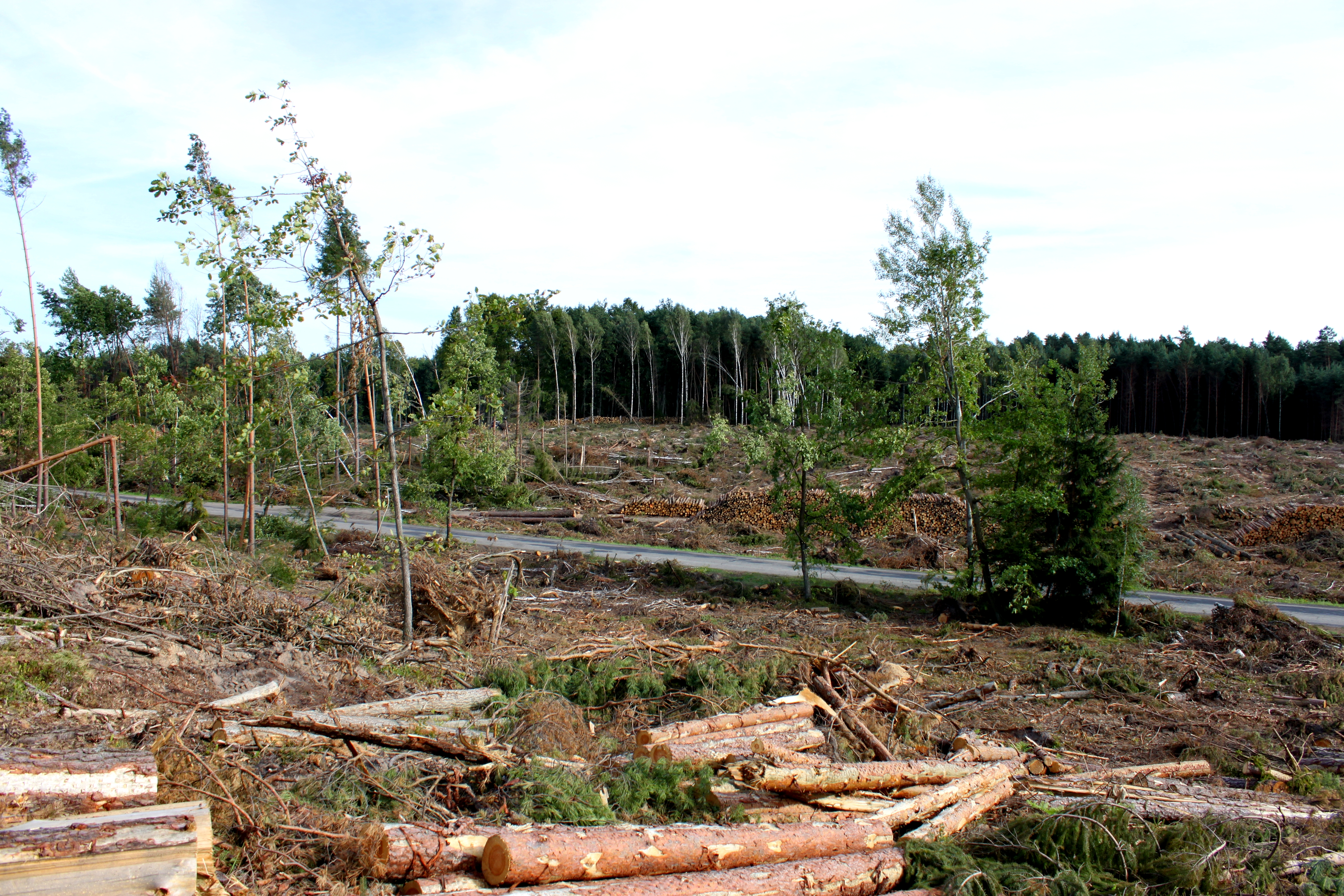
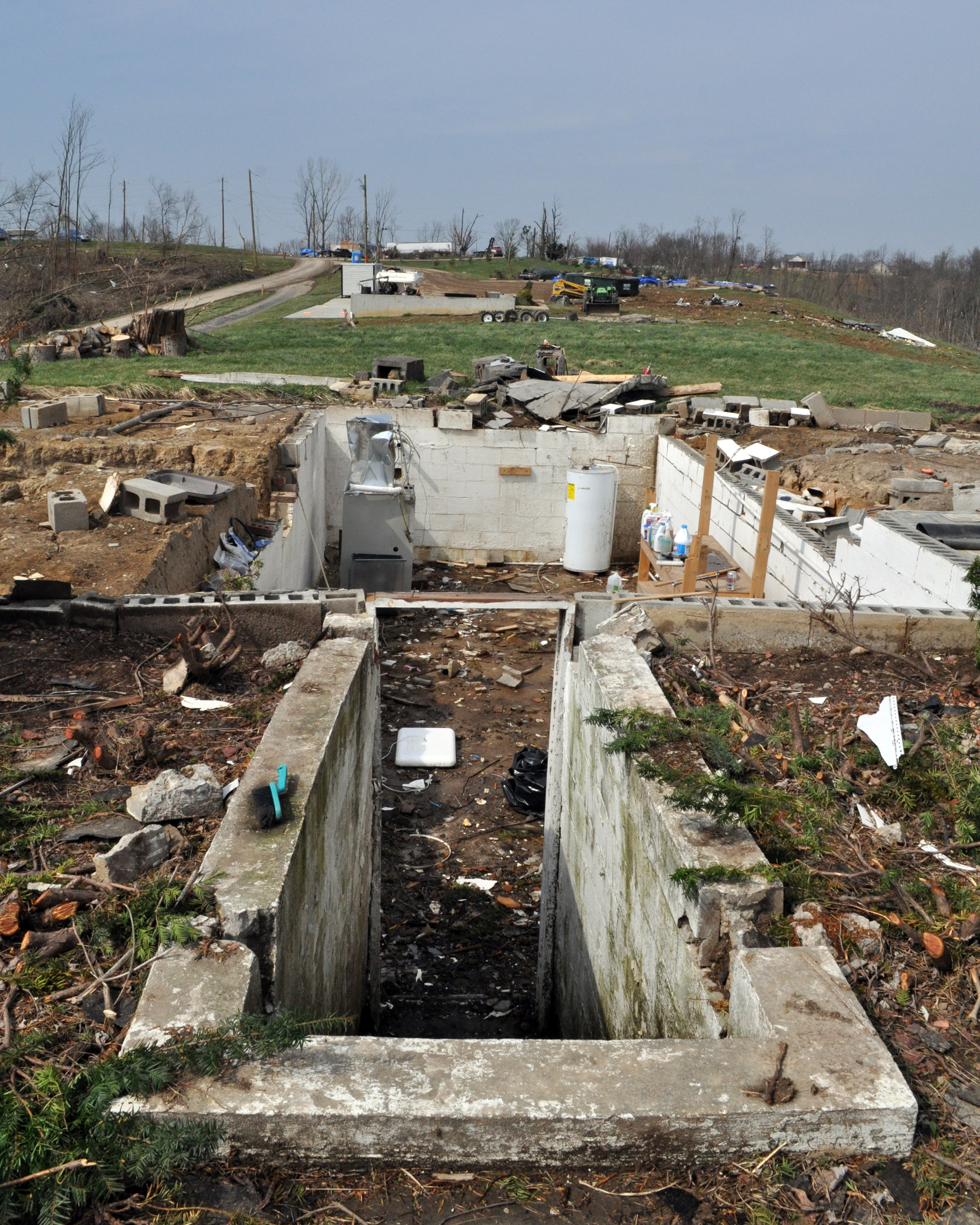
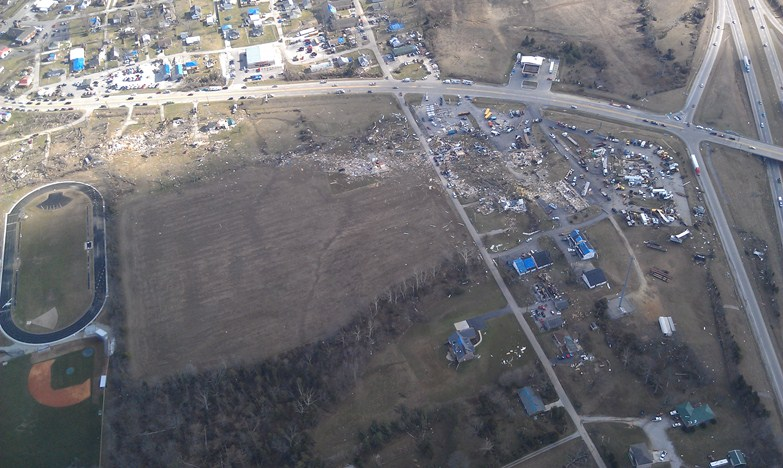
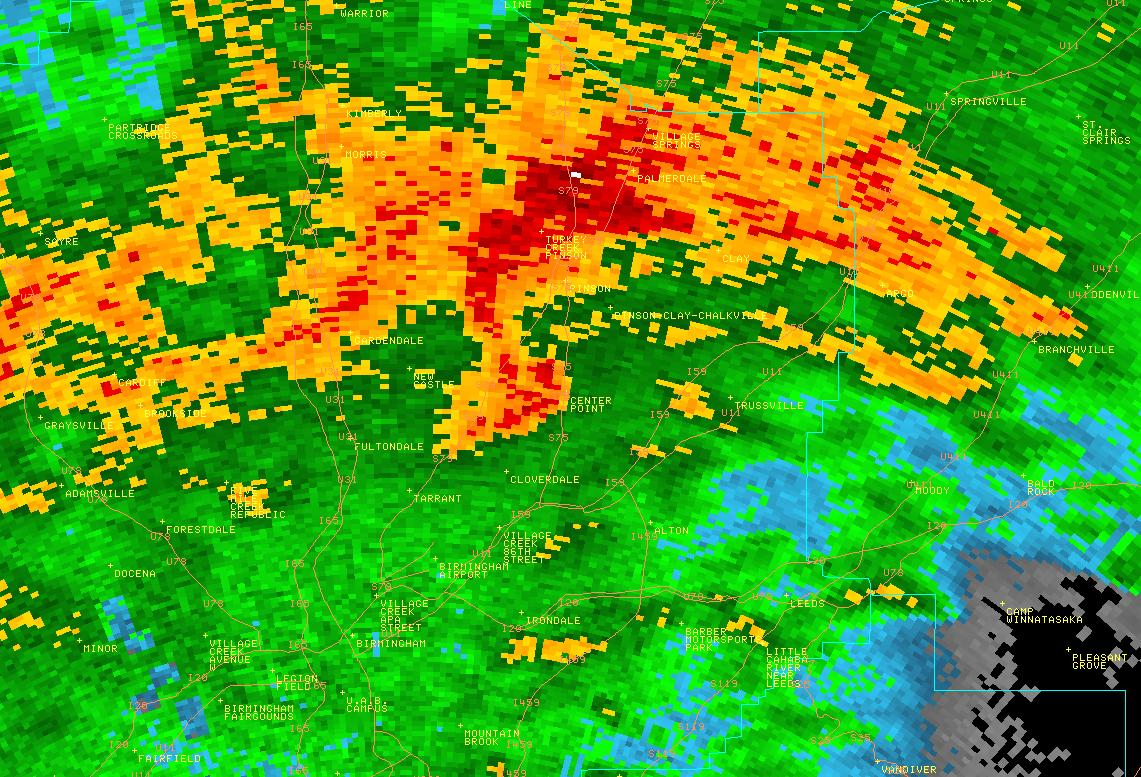
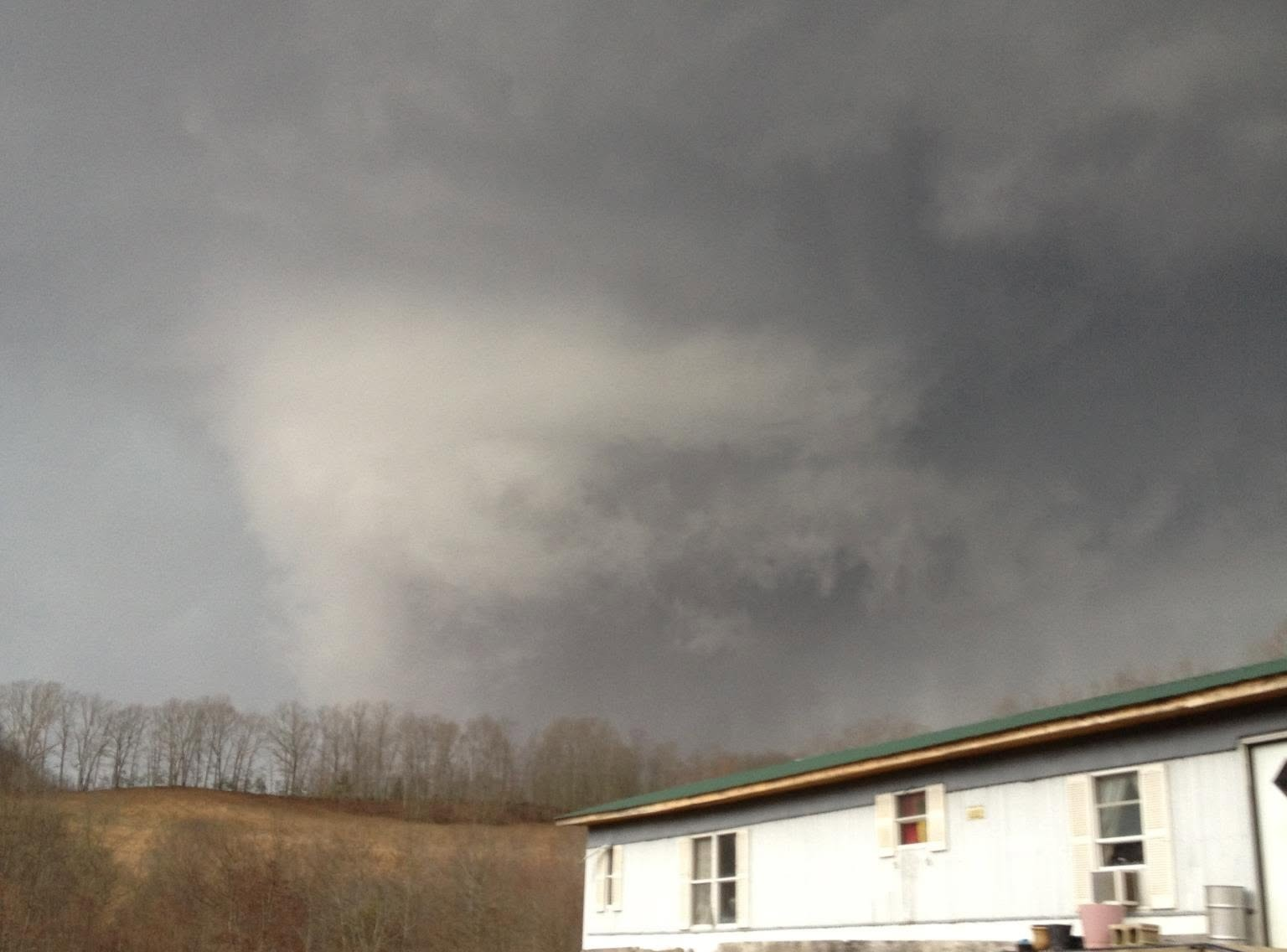
- Clockwise from top: A large EF4 tornado near Kanopolis Lake, Kansas on April 14; Remains of a home near Crittenden, Kentucky following an EF4 tornado on March 2; A radar scan of an EF3 tornado in Center Point, Alabama on January 23; A deadly EF3 tornado outside of West Liberty, Kentucky on March 2; Destruction to several structures in Henryville, Indiana after an EF4 tornado on March 2; A destroyed forest in Poland following an F3 tornado on July 14.
- Timespan: January 9 – December 26, 2012
- Maximum rated tornado: EF4 tornado: Harrisburg, Illinois on February 29; Henryville, Indiana on March 2; Crittenden, Kentucky on March 2; Langley, Kansas on April 14
- Tornadoes in U.S.: 948
- Damage (U.S.): ~$1.6 billion
- Fatalities (U.S.): 69
- Fatalities (worldwide): 93

This page documents the tornadoes and tornado outbreaks of 2012. Extremely destructive tornadoes form most frequently in the United States, Bangladesh, Brazil and eastern India, but they can occur almost anywhere under the right conditions. Tornadoes also appear regularly in neighboring southern Canada during the Northern Hemisphere's summer season, and somewhat regularly in Europe, Asia, Argentina, and Australia.

There were 948 tornadoes confirmed in the U.S. in 2012. Worldwide, 93 fatalities have been confirmed: 69 in the United States, six in Turkey, five each in China and Indonesia, three in New Zealand and one each in Colombia, Italy, Japan, Poland and Philippines.

== Synopsis ==
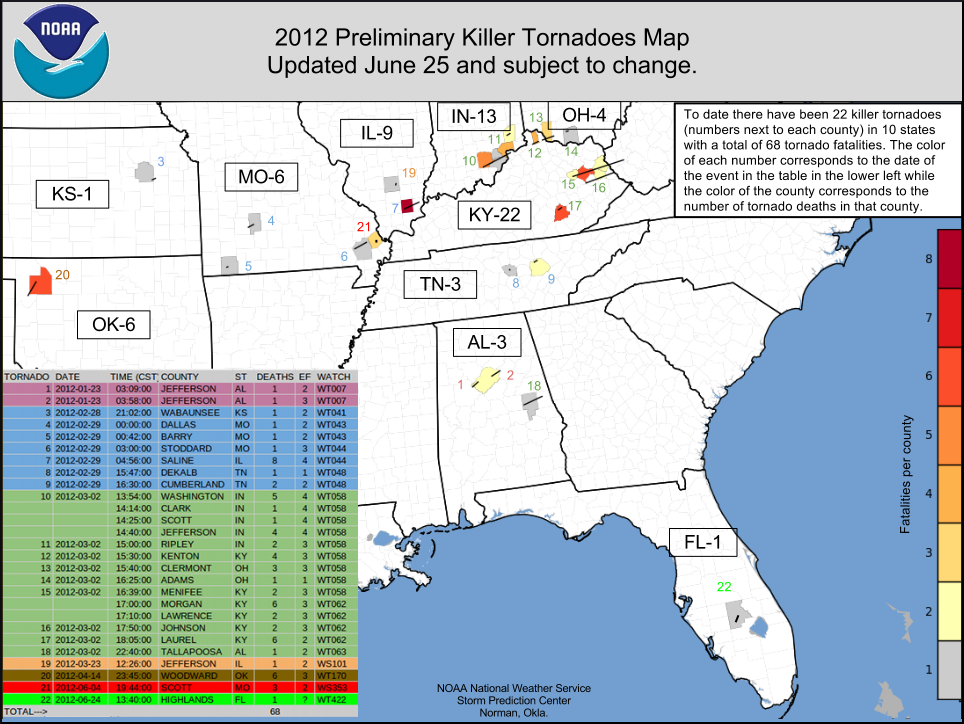
Map of all killer tornadoes within the United States in 2012. Only affected counties with fatalities are highlighted along the tracks.

The year began with an unusual number of tornadoes during January 2012. The first major tornado outbreak occurred on January 22–23, when a spring-like system moved across the southern Mississippi valley, producing at least two dozen confirmed tornadoes across Arkansas, Kentucky, Mississippi, Tennessee, and Alabama. As a whole, January was the third most active on record, behind 1999 and 2008. Despite this, a significant contrast in activity occurred for the month of February. Despite a slow beginning, the month of February ended with a significant tornado outbreak on the 28th and 29th with a strong EF4 doing significant damage and killing eight in Harrisburg, Illinois.

Another ramp-up in activity occurred in early March, with one of the largest outbreaks ever recorded in the United States for that time of the year. This outbreak produced 160 reported tornadoes, and affected areas across Indiana and Kentucky in particular. Using the adjusted preliminary tornado count (85% of the total preliminary reports in order to remove overcount), 2012 attained record tornado activity on March 23 with 319 reports, eclipsing the previous record of 317.

A relative lull in tornado activity occurred in mid-March, but activity soon rose again by the end of the month when an EF2 killed one person on March 23 near Louisville, Kentucky. The beginning of April also started off active, with a tornado outbreak occurring in North Texas, including the Dallas–Fort Worth metroplex. An EF2 caused significant damage in the city of Arlington, where a state of disaster was declared. An EF3 also caused significant damage in Forney, Texas; despite this, no fatalities were reported throughout the outbreak.

From April 13–16, an outbreak producing over 95 confirmed tornadoes swept across the Midwest, Kansas and Oklahoma in particular. A tornado emergency was issued for the city of Wichita late on April 14 as an EF3 moved across the southeastern portion of the city. A couple hours later, an EF3 in Oklahoma killed six people when it hit the city of Woodward just after midnight. One EF4 tornado was confirmed in Kansas on April 14, where it stripped trees of bark and destroyed a farmstead. On April 30, several tornadoes swept across Oklahoma and Kansas.

By contrast, May was much quieter than usual for what is normally the most active month. Several minor outbreaks were spread around the month but no major outbreaks and no fatalities took place. June was also quiet, although there were a few small outbreaks. These included an EF2 on June 4 that caused three fatalities in Diehlstadt, Missouri, and a small outbreak in Florida associated with Tropical Storm Debby that killed one person.

The summer months were among the quietest on record as a persistent ridge prevented any significant storms from developing in the United States, as cooler air was unable to penetrate southward and was held into Canada (similar to February 2010 when warm air was suppressed into the Caribbean). July was very quiet with only 35 confirmed tornadoes. August and September were also generally very quiet as well, broken only by an active period after Hurricane Isaac made landfall, producing a sizable multi-day tornado outbreak.

October continued to be quiet with only 30 confirmed tornadoes throughout the month. As of October 29, 2025, 2012 ranks as the quietest year for tornadoes in the United States, with an estimated 885 tornadoes, below the previous record minimum for that point in the year of 920 tornadoes. Unlike 2011, 2012 went without an EF5 tornado.

== Events ==
=== United States ===
Confirmed tornadoes by Enhanced Fujita rating
| EFU | EF0 | EF1 | EF2 | EF3 | EF4 | EF5 | Total |
|---|---|---|---|---|---|---|---|
| 0 | 583 | 241 | 94 | 26 | 4 | 0 | 948 |

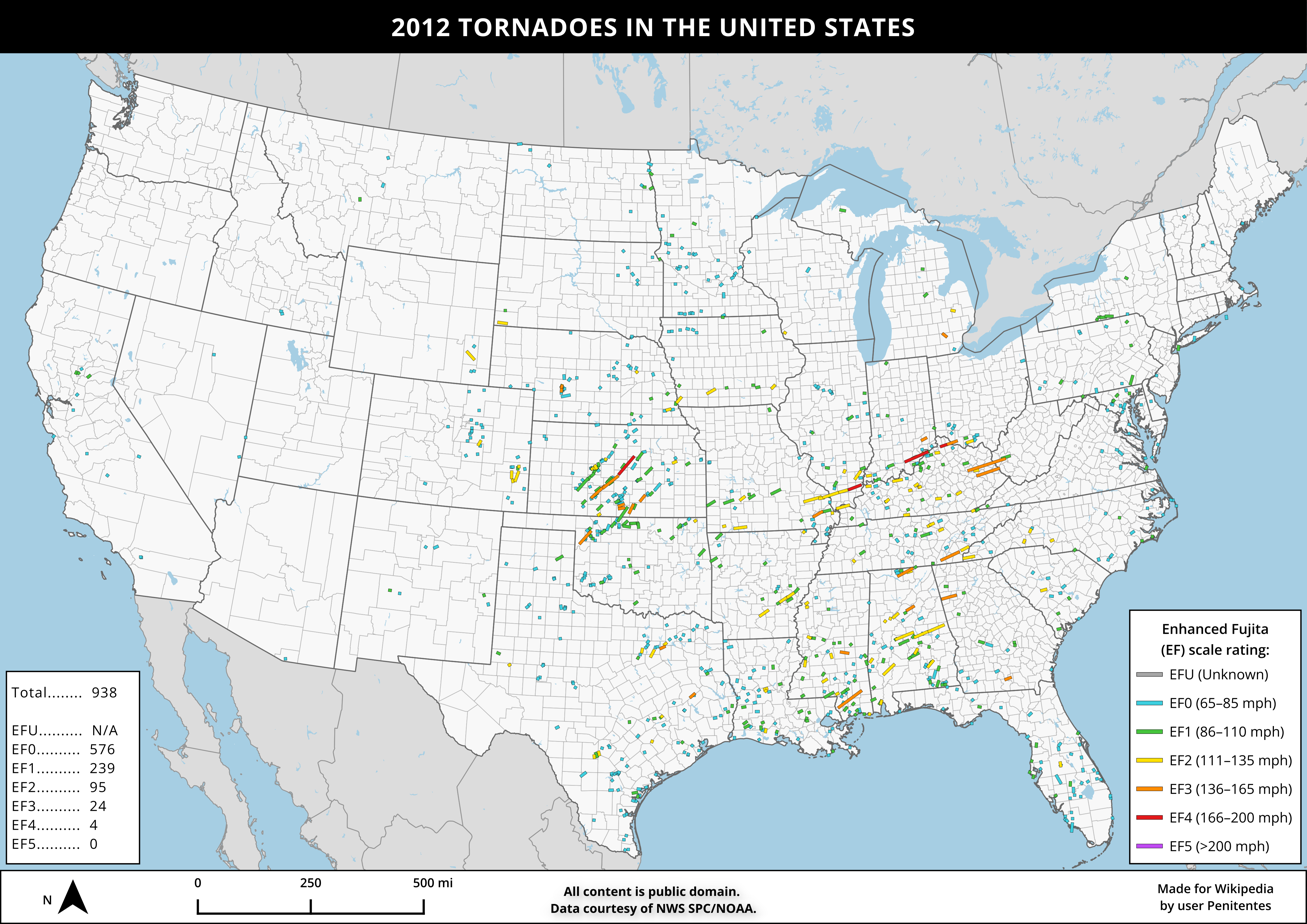
A map of 2012 United States tornado paths from the results of storm surveys.

A chart of the 2012 United States tornado count estimated from the number of preliminary reports

Fatal United States tornadoes in 2012
- Approximate touchdown location of killer tornadoes in 2012 Summary of tornadoes: January 23 – Alabama (1 death); January 23 – Alabama (1 death); February 28 – Kansas (1 death); February 28 – Missouri (1 death); February 29 – Missouri (1 death); February 29 – Missouri (1 death); February 29 – Illinois (8 deaths); February 29 – Tennessee (1 death); February 29 – Tennessee (2 deaths); March 2 – Indiana, Kentucky (11 deaths); March 2 – Indiana (3 deaths); March 2 – Kentucky (4 deaths); March 2 – Kentucky, Ohio (3 deaths); March 2 – Ohio (1 death); March 2 – Kentucky, West Virginia (10 deaths); March 2 – Kentucky, West Virginia (2 deaths); March 2 – Kentucky (6 deaths); March 2 – Alabama (1 death); March 23 – Illinois (1 death); April 14 – Oklahoma (6 deaths); June 4 – Missouri (3 deaths); June 24 – Florida (1 death); Total fatalities: 69

== January ==
=== January 9–11 (United States) ===
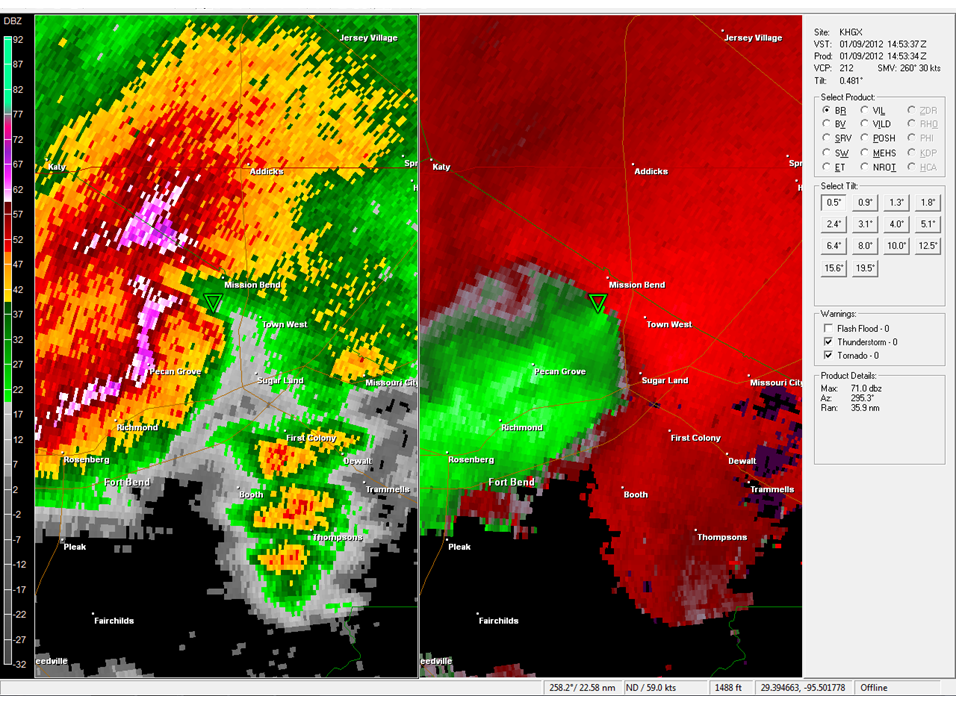
Radar image of the severe thunderstorm that spawned an EF1 tornado near Mission Bend, Texas on January 9.

| EFU | EF0 | EF1 | EF2 | EF3 | EF4 | EF5 |
|---|---|---|---|---|---|---|
| 0 | 5 | 1 | 2 | 0 | 0 | 0 |

On the morning of January 9, a mid-level area of low pressure moved east-northeast across the Big Bend of Texas and triggered the development of a surface low in southeastern Texas before noon local time. Along the eastern side of this system, warm, moist air from the Gulf of Mexico was drawn northward and created an environment favoring supercell thunderstorms, though widespread clouds limited the extent of activity. A line of strong thunderstorms developed in southeastern Texas around 9:00 a.m. CST moved slowly eastward. Only isolated reports of damaging winds and a few tornadoes accompanied this line and no tornado or severe thunderstorm watches were issued. Five tornadoes touched down in association with this line of storms, one of which was an EF1 that caused significant damage to a home near Mission Bend, Texas.

Developing into an upper-level system over the Ark-La-Tex region on January 10, the risk for more widespread severe weather was evident; however, only isolated reports were received that day. Continuing eastward, additional severe weather was expected along coastal North Carolina on January 11 before the system moved into the Atlantic Ocean. However, a severe storm developed in South Carolina and moved into western North Carolina, outside the area anticipated to support tornadoes, and soon spawned a tornado around 5:22 p.m. EST. Rated as a low-end EF2, the tornado tracked for 2.5 mi (4.0 km) and damaged or destroyed dozens of structures near Ellenboro. Ten people were injured by the storm. Continuing northeast, the thunderstorm spawned another, more intense EF2 tornado around 6:04 p.m. that caused extensive damage in the South Fork community. There, several mobile homes were completely destroyed and a few homes sustained significant damage. Eight people in the community were injured by the tornado. Another EF0 tornado touched down less than 20 minutes later before the event ended.

=== January 17 (United States) ===
| EFU | EF0 | EF1 | EF2 | EF3 | EF4 | EF5 |
|---|---|---|---|---|---|---|
| 0 | 4 | 5 | 2 | 0 | 0 | 0 |

As a line of intense thunderstorms moved southward throughout much of the Ohio River Valley and Southeast, many tornadoes were reported. The first tornado of the day occurred near Madison, Indiana, and was rated an EF0 on the Enhanced Fujita scale; only minor damage was reported. The second tornado occurred in Floyd County, Indiana, which destroyed portions of homes and trees; it was later rated an EF1. The third tornado touched down near Clarksville, Indiana, and was rated an EF0 due to the minor damage it caused. One of the first confirmed tornadoes on January 17 was an EF1 near St. Matthews, Kentucky, which injured a truck driver on I-265. The most significant tornado was an EF2 southwest of Scottsville, Kentucky, that tore the roof from one home and destroyed numerous weaker structures. Another EF2 tornado destroyed a mobile home and badly damaged several permanent homes near Sandy Hook, Mississippi. A total of 14 tornado reports were called in this day.

=== January 22–23 (United States) ===
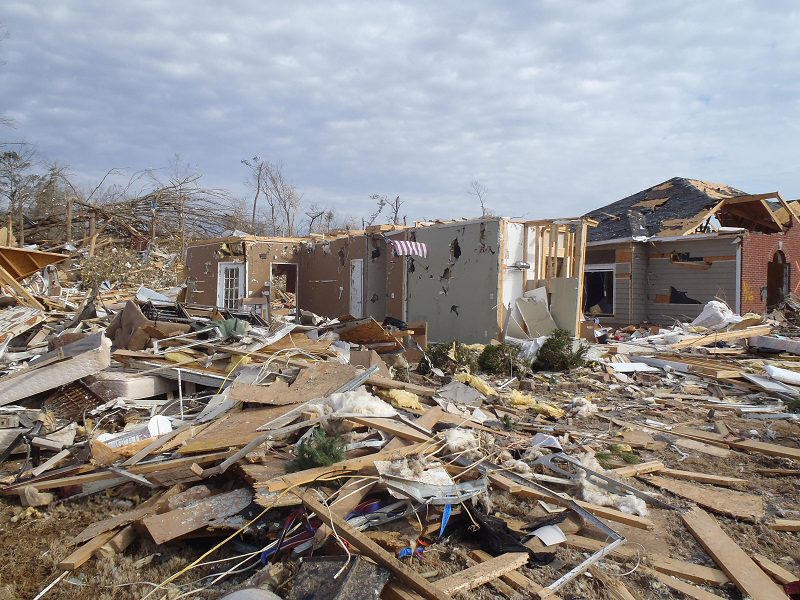
EF3 damage to a house in Center Point, Alabama.

| EFU | EF0 | EF1 | EF2 | EF3 | EF4 | EF5 |
|---|---|---|---|---|---|---|
| 0 | 5 | 10 | 9 | 1 | 0 | 0 |

On January 22, the Storm Prediction Center issued a moderate risk for severe weather across parts of the Southern United States and Ohio Valley. Late that afternoon, a Particularly Dangerous Situation tornado watch was issued for much of Arkansas and parts of Tennessee and Mississippi. At sunset, multiple discrete supercell thunderstorms developed over Arkansas and began producing significant tornadoes. An EF2 tornado impacted the northwestern fringes of Fordyce, Arkansas, damaging or destroying multiple homes, collapsing metal truss towers, and heavily damaging a local country club. Another EF2 tornado near Sweden, Arkansas, severely damaged a metal building, a radio tower, large grain bins, vehicles, and farm machinery. Two separate tornadoes, rated EF2 and EF1, caused considerable damage to metal truss towers, outbuildings, trees, and power poles near De Witt. Further to the east, multiple mobile homes were destroyed by an EF2 tornado near Alligator, Mississippi. While much of this outbreak was centered across the deep south, several tornadoes touched down further to the north as well. This included an EF2 tornado that touched down near Enfield, Illinois, and destroyed many barns, outbuildings, and garages along its path, as well as a communications tower. An EF1 tornado caused moderate damage in the town of Hazel, Kentucky, as well. Further south, the storms pushed eastward and grew upscale into and organized squall line around midnight.

Overnight and into the very early morning hours, another round of discrete supercell activity developed ahead of the squall line as the storms pushed into Alabama. This resulted in a wave of significant tornadoes that raked across the state just before sunrise. An EF2 tornado heavily damaged or destroyed many homes and mobile homes in the rural community of Oak Grove, killing one person. The most significant tornado of the event was a destructive EF3 tornado that severely impacted parts of the Birmingham metro. This tornado touched down near Tarrant before tearing through Center Point, Chalkville, and Clay, killing one person and destroying hundreds of homes and businesses. Another damaging, long-tracked EF2 tornado first snapped and uprooted thousands of trees in the Talladega National Forest before striking Maplesville, heavily damaging or destroying multiple homes and businesses in town before eventually dissipating near Clanton. Overall, this outbreak produced 25 tornadoes and two deaths. Across Alabama alone, insurers estimated damage from the tornadoes to have been at least $30 million.

== February ==
=== February 20 (Philippines) ===
An EF1 tornado struck a village in Kabankalan, Negros Occidental that resulted in 13 houses partially damaged and a 5-year-old kid killed by an uprooted tree.

=== February 24 (Indonesia) ===
A strong tornado struck South Sulawesi province in Indonesia, killing five people and damaging or destroying 98 structures.

=== February 28–29 (United States) ===
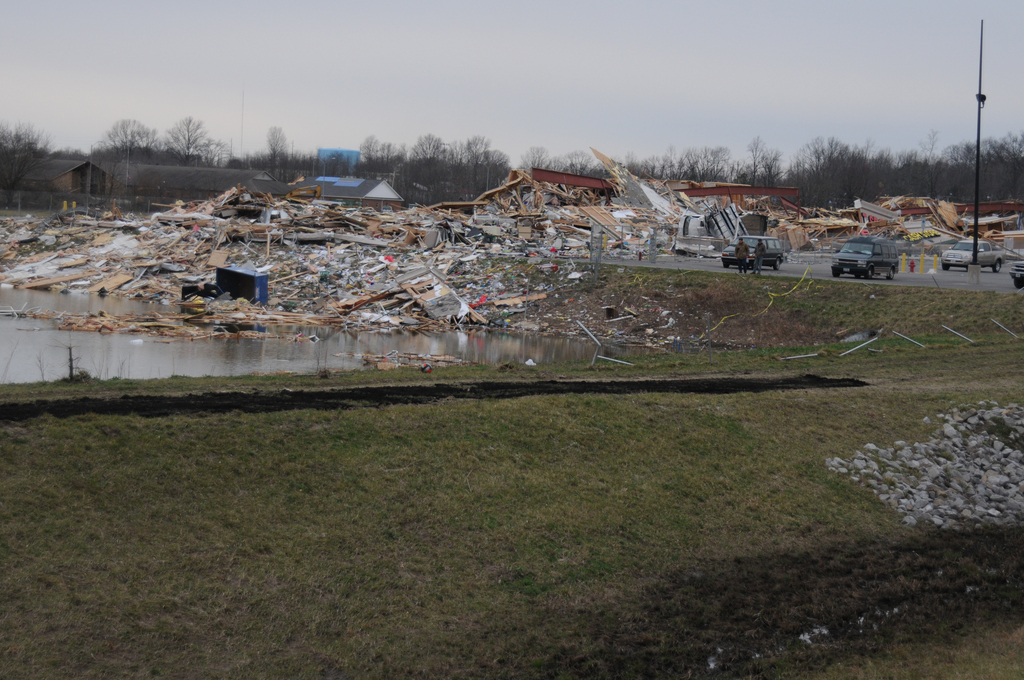
EF4 damage to a shopping center in Harrisburg, Illinois.

| EFU | EF0 | EF1 | EF2 | EF3 | EF4 | EF5 |
|---|---|---|---|---|---|---|
| 0 | 10 | 13 | 17 | 1 | 1 | 0 |

A significant and deadly tornado outbreak began in the Great Plains on February 28, as supercell thunderstorms developed and multiple tornadoes touched down across the region. An EF2 tornado struck the small town of Harveyville, Kansas, during the late evening hours, killing one person and injuring 12 others. The town's only church was completely destroyed, several homes received moderate to severe damage, and every building in the small community received a form of damage. As the storms moved into Missouri later that night and into the early morning hours of February 29, numerous strong tornadoes touched down. An EF2 devastated a mobile home park and killed one person near Buffalo, while an EF3 caused another fatality and destroyed homes near Asherville. By 3:00 am CST on February 29, Branson, Missouri, was reporting injuries and severe damage to the town from an EF2 tornado, with homes destroyed and several hotels, businesses, and theaters sustaining severe damage. Three other deaths occurred in southern Missouri.

As the storms moved into Illinois in the pre-dawn hours, they merged into an intense squall line with embedded semi-discrete supercell thunderstorms. A violent EF4 tornado touched down and ripped through the city of Harrisburg, destroying entire neighborhoods, flattening businesses, and killing 8 people before causing additional destruction in the neighboring town of Ridgway. After sunrise, additional supercells developed and produced numerous tornadoes across Kentucky and Tennessee. Two tornadoes, rated EF1 and EF2, caused significant damage in Greenville, Kentucky. The town of Hodgenville, Kentucky, also sustained heavy damage from two separate EF2 tornadoes. An EF1 tornado caused a fatality near Smithville, Tennessee, and an EF2 destroyed homes and killed two more people near Tennessee before the outbreak came to an end. A total of 42 tornadoes were confirmed, and 15 people were killed.

== March ==
=== March 2–3 (United States) ===
| EFU | EF0 | EF1 | EF2 | EF3 | EF4 | EF5 |
|---|---|---|---|---|---|---|
| 0 | 27 | 18 | 14 | 9 | 2 | 0 |

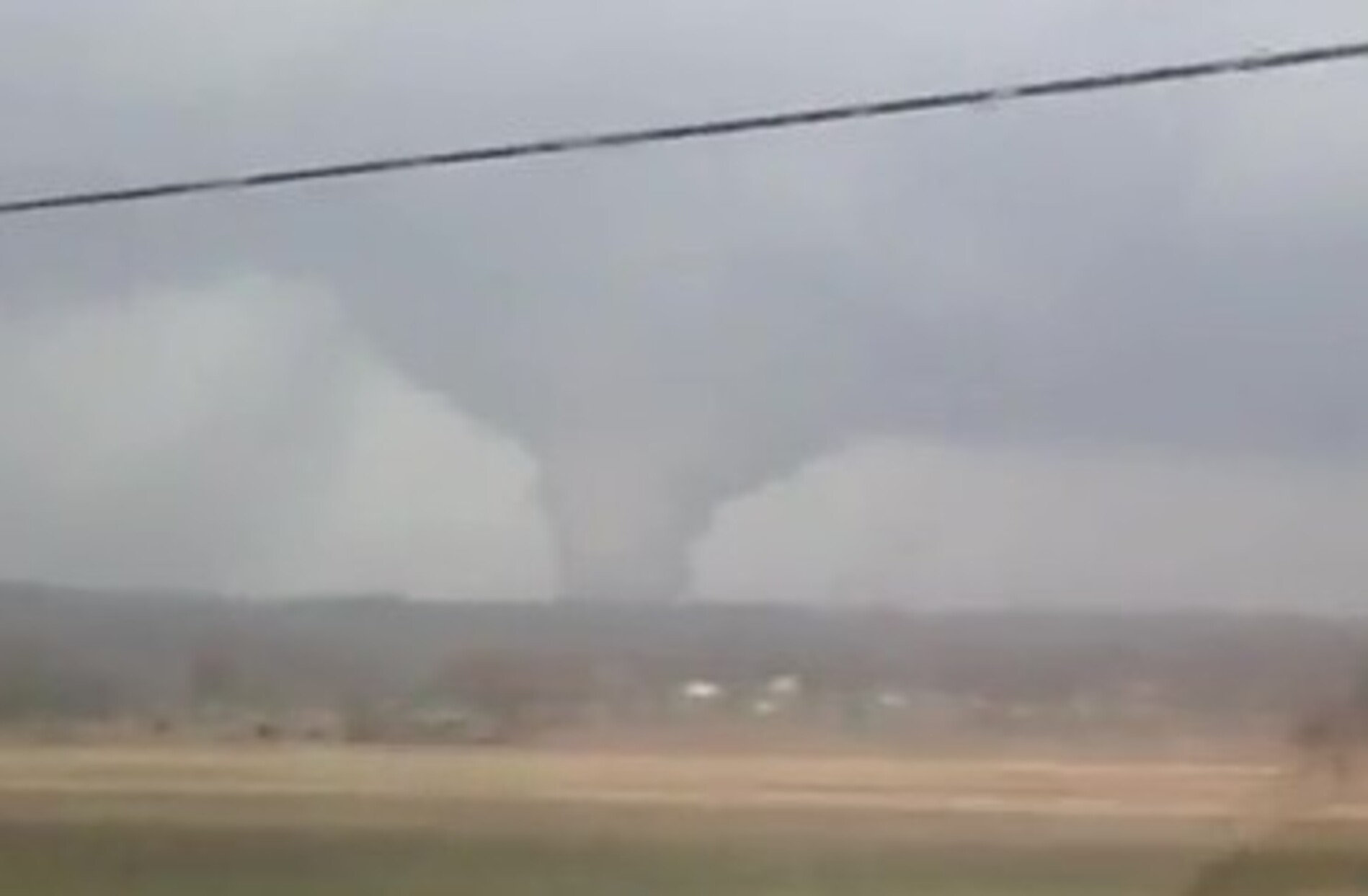
A large EF4 tornado seen in rural forested areas between New Pekin and Henryville, Indiana

From March 2 to 3, a devastating and deadly outbreak of strong to violent tornadoes impacted the Southern United States and Ohio Valley. A moderate risk of severe weather was issued for March 2 a day in advance for a large area from near Tuscaloosa, Alabama, to Dayton, Ohio, as an intense storm system tracked across the region in a very highly sheared and unstable environment. On the morning of March 2, it was upgraded and a high risk of severe weather was issued for Middle Tennessee and central Kentucky, later extended into central and southern Indiana and southern Ohio, including a 30% hatched risk area for tornadoes. The Storm Prediction Center mentioned the potential for multiple long-tracked, violent tornadoes. Multiple PDS tornado watches were issued shortly thereafter. For only the second time in history (the first being April 27, 2011, for the 2011 Super Outbreak), Dr. Greg Forbes, severe weather expert for The Weather Channel, issued a TOR:CON (short for "tornado condition index", a scale to rate the risk of tornadic activity over a given region based on atmospheric conditions) rating of 10 out of 10; this time for the Louisville, Kentucky region and along the Ohio River of Indiana and Kentucky.

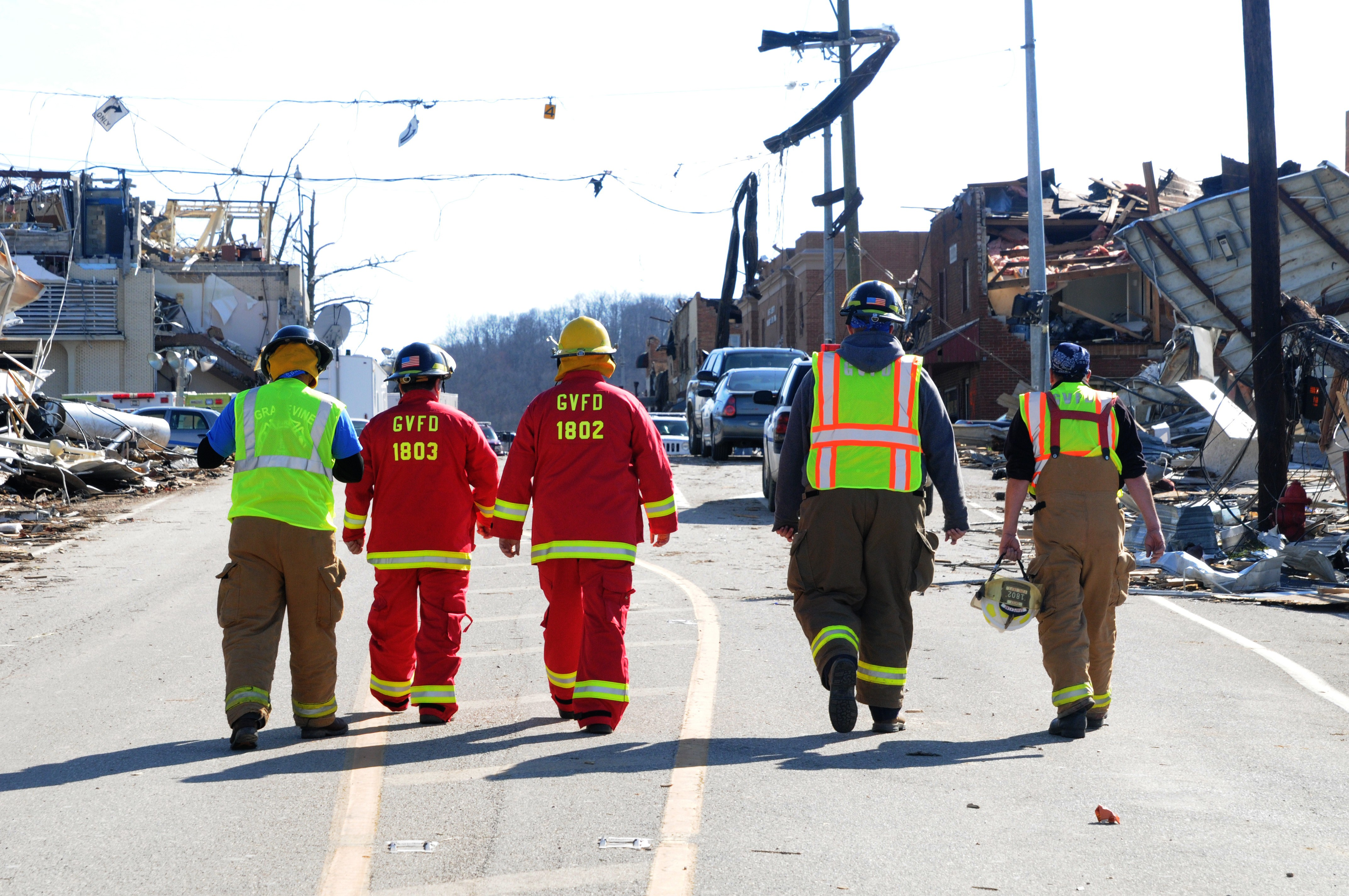
Firefighters and the Kentucky National Guard in West Liberty, Kentucky following an intense EF3 tornado. Photo courtesy of the United States Army.

Tornadoes began early; shortly after 9:00 am CST, an intense EF3 tornado north of Huntsville, Alabama, resulted in severe damage to houses and also caused damage at a school. A long-lived EF4 formed just north of the Ohio River that afternoon, resulting in extreme damage to numerous communities in southern Indiana, including Marysville and Henryville. Another EF4 wedge tornado killed four people and obliterated homes near Crittenden, Kentucky, while a large EF3 killed three people and destroyed most of Moscow, Ohio. At around 6:00 pm EST, an EF3 tornado impacted downtown West Liberty, Kentucky, resulting in major damage and 10 deaths. A high-end EF3 tornado also caused major damage to many homes in businesses in Salyersville, Kentucky, killing two people along its path. Another high-end EF3 tornado touched down at 8:03 pm. This storm tracked into Haralson County, Georgia, and Paulding County, Georgia, where it caused major damage in the Dallas area before dissipating. There was a final tornado-related death toll of 41 people—22 in Kentucky, 14 in Indiana, four in Ohio and one in Alabama. A total of 70 tornadoes were confirmed as a result of this outbreak.

=== March 15 (Michigan) ===
| EFU | EF0 | EF1 | EF2 | EF3 | EF4 | EF5 |
|---|---|---|---|---|---|---|
| 0 | 1 | 0 | 1 | 1 | 0 | 0 |

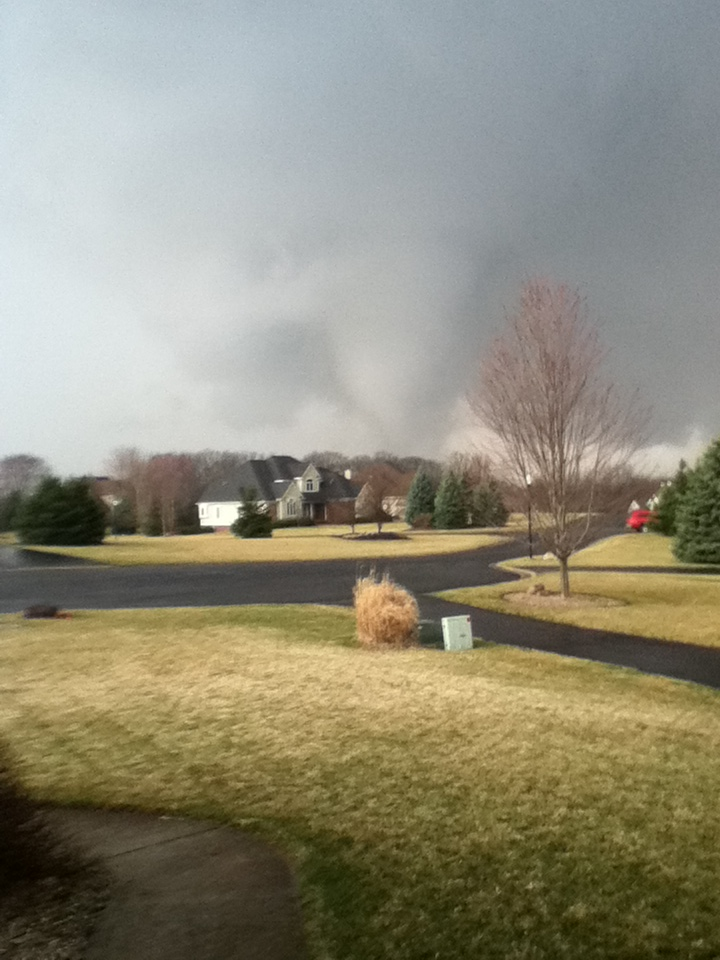
The Dexter, Michigan EF3 tornado near Brass Creek.

As a weak disturbance moved across the Ohio Valley, energy associated with the system, combined with abnormally warm temperatures, led to the formation of severe thunderstorms from Michigan to the Gulf States, where the Storm Prediction Center had already issued a Slight risk. As the day progressed, isolated thunderstorms began to form and quickly strengthened into tornado-producing cells across the state of Michigan, with Tornado Warnings being issued for Lenawee, Washtenaw, Lapeer, and Monroe Counties. After surveying the area, the National Weather Service confirmed three tornado touchdowns on March 15 across Michigan. The first was an EF0, causing minor tree, structure, and power line damage. The second was rated an EF2, uprooting many trees and shifting a house off of its foundation 3 miles (4.8 km) south of Columbiaville, Michigan, 5 miles (8.0 km) northwest of Lapeer, Michigan. The final was rated an EF3 on the Enhanced Fujita Scale, with winds between 135 and 140 miles per hour (217–225 km/h). This tornado impacted the city of Dexter, where severe structural damage was recorded and multiple homes were destroyed.

=== March 18–24 (United States) ===
| EFU | EF0 | EF1 | EF2 | EF3 | EF4 | EF5 |
|---|---|---|---|---|---|---|
| 0 | 36 | 17 | 8 | 2 | 0 | 0 |

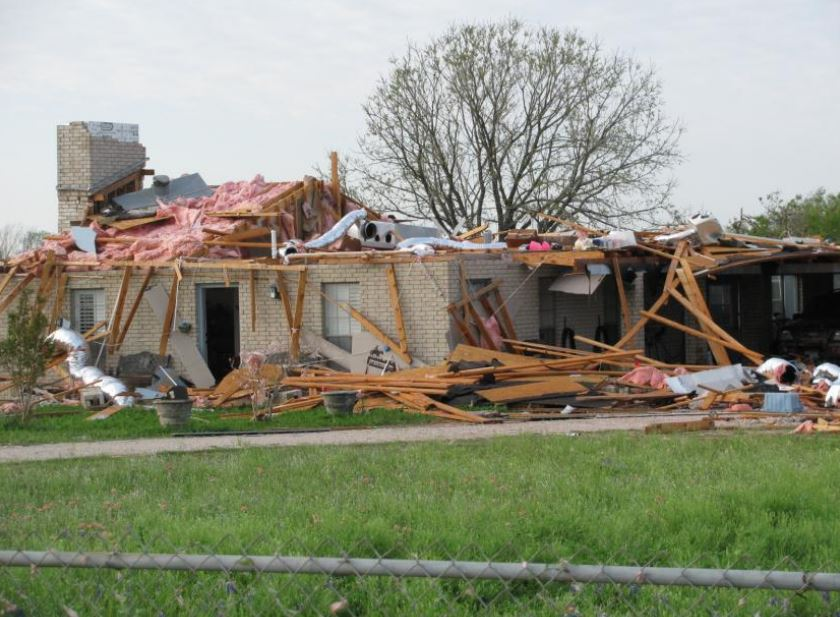
EF2 damage to a house near LaCoste, Texas.

A slow-moving cutoff low produced numerous tornadoes over a seven-day period, several of which were strong. On March 18, two EF3 tornadoes and two EF2 tornadoes destroyed homes and caused severe damage near North Platte, Nebraska. On March 19, several more strong EF2 tornadoes touched down in Southwest Texas, and several weak tornadoes impacted the San Antonio, Texas, area. Other tornadoes, a few of which were strong, touched down in Louisiana and Mississippi from March 20 and 22. One person was slightly injured as a result of an EF2 tornado that struck the town of Gueydan, Louisiana. On March 23, several additional tornadoes were reported across Illinois, Indiana, Ohio, and Kentucky, including a high-end EF1 that caused heavy damage in the Louisville, Kentucky, suburbs. One person was killed and two others were injured when a high-end EF2 tornado obliterated a tied-down mobile home near Opdyke, Illinois. On March 24, a weak EF0 touched down in Florida as the system moved eastward and came to an end.

=== March 20 (Australia) ===
At 5 am, an F2 tornado struck the suburb of Vincent in Townsville, Queensland. The tornado ripped roofs off of homes and businesses and was accompanied by heavy rain. Vehicles were flipped, and trees and power poles were snapped. Damage was said to be "worse than Yasi".

== April ==
=== April 3 (Texas) ===
| EFU | EF0 | EF1 | EF2 | EF3 | EF4 | EF5 |
|---|---|---|---|---|---|---|
| 0 | 16 | 1 | 2 | 2 | 0 | 0 |

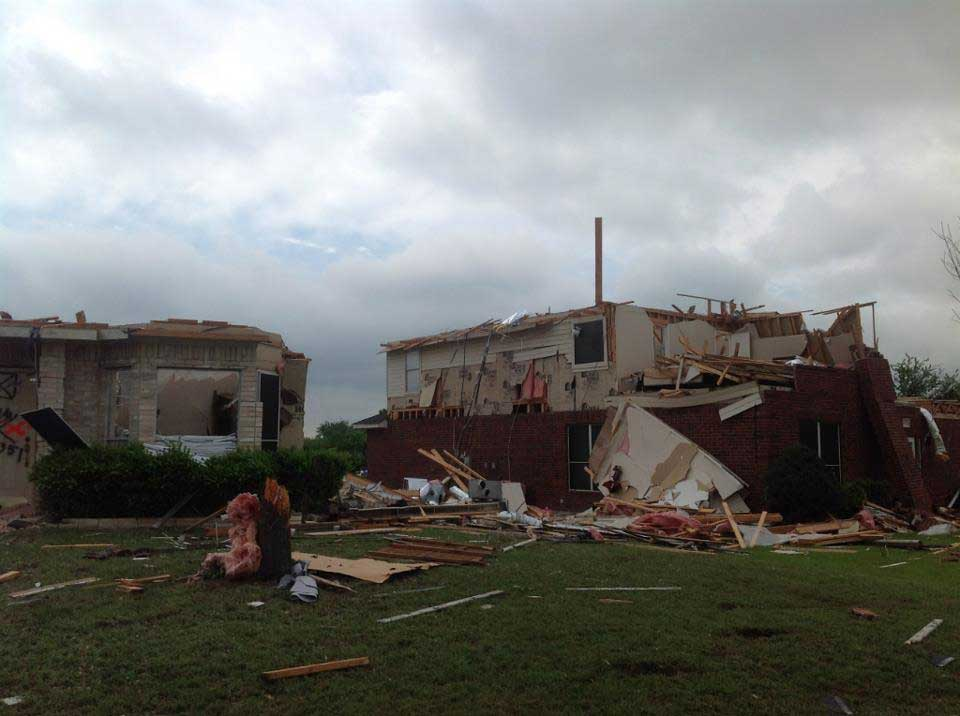
EF2 damage to homes in Lancaster, Texas.

During the afternoon and late evening of April 3, multiple tornadic supercell thunderstorms developed and moved through the Dallas–Fort Worth metroplex, producing multiple destructive tornadoes, injuring many people, and forcing a ground stomp at Dallas/Fort Worth International Airport. In Lancaster, just south of Dallas, the Schneider National facility was impacted by a high-end EF2 tornado live on TV, and a news helicopter broadcast live video of large semi-trailers being lofted into the air at that location. The city of Arlington was also hit by a damaging EF2 tornado and declared a state of disaster shortly afterward. The first intense tornado of the outbreak was an EF3 that completely destroyed homes in Forney with wind speeds up to 150 mph. A second EF3 wedge tornado caused major damage near Royse City, Texas, as well. In addition, numerous weak tornadoes were also observed. Despite the severe damage and injuries, no fatalities occurred. A total of 21 tornadoes were confirmed as a result of this outbreak.

=== April 4 (Argentina) ===
| FU | F0 | F1 | F2 | F3 | F4 | F5 |
|---|---|---|---|---|---|---|
| 0 | 0 | 2 | 2 | 0 | 0 | 0 |

On April 4, 2012, a strong storm styem in the shape of a bow echo formed in the province of Buenos Aires and its storms affected most of the Greater Buenos Aires area, including Ciudad de Buenos Aires. The storm system killed 17 people, injured 893, and inflicted material damage valued at 275.5 million Argentine pesos. For their level of destruction and peculularity, these storms are the most destructive to hit the Buenos Aires-La Plata metropolitan area in its history.

Diego Santilli, the minister of the Argentine Ministry of Environment and Public Space, stated that these storms were the result of climate change, and an ongoing "tropicalization of Buenos Aires."

=== April 9 (Turkey) ===
A destructive F2 tornado struck a construction site in Elazığ Province, Turkey, killing six people and injuring seven others. All of the fatalities took place at a housing complex within the construction site in Maden. A storage container, a tractor, and multiple trucks were tossed. Several homes were reportedly damaged or destroyed along the 11 km (6.8 mi) path of the tornado, and significant damage was also observed in Dutpinar and Kaşlıca.

=== April 10 (Philippines) ===
An EF1 tornado struck two villages in Lake Sebu, South Cotabato at around 14:30 PhST where it destroyed at least 25 houses, killed a 12-year-old girl, and injured 2 others.

=== April 13–16 (United States) ===
| EFU | EF0 | EF1 | EF2 | EF3 | EF4 | EF5 |
|---|---|---|---|---|---|---|
| 0 | 68 | 36 | 3 | 5 | 1 | 0 |

Series of radar images showing supercell thunderstorms and a squall line across mainly Kansas and Oklahoma on April 14.

An impressive low pressure area and associated trough began tracking into the Great Plains on April 13, and a slight risk of severe weather was issued. The outlook mentioned the possibility of tornadoes, including the risk for isolated strong tornadoes. No strong tornadoes occurred, though an EF1 tornado caused considerable damage in Norman, Oklahoma. For only the second time in history (previously for April 7, 2006), a day two high risk of severe weather was issued by the Storm Prediction Center. In the discussion, the SPC stated that a major tornado outbreak was likely across central Kansas and north-central Oklahoma during the afternoon and overnight hours of April 14, with long-tracked violent tornadoes likely. It was later expanded to include a second high risk area across much of Nebraska, where a rare 45% tornado probability was given during the late morning update on April 13. During the morning hours on the 14th, the high risk area was expanded again to combine the two separate areas into a single large one. Later in the day, the 45% tornado probability was shifted from Nebraska south to Kansas and northern Oklahoma. A large outbreak of tornadoes impacted the Great Plains states on April 14, and several PDS Tornado Warnings were issued during the outbreak. Initially, most of the tornadoes were small or remained over open country, though more significant tornado activity began to develop throughout the day. A high-end EF2 tornado struck Creston, Iowa, flipping vehicles and causing major structural damage to homes and other buildings in town. Another EF2 wedge tornado struck Thurman, Iowa, damaging 75% of the town. In Nebraska, a strong EF2 tornado destroyed outbuildings and badly damaged a home near Cook, while a large and violent EF4 tornado leveled a home and debarked trees near Marquette, Kansas.

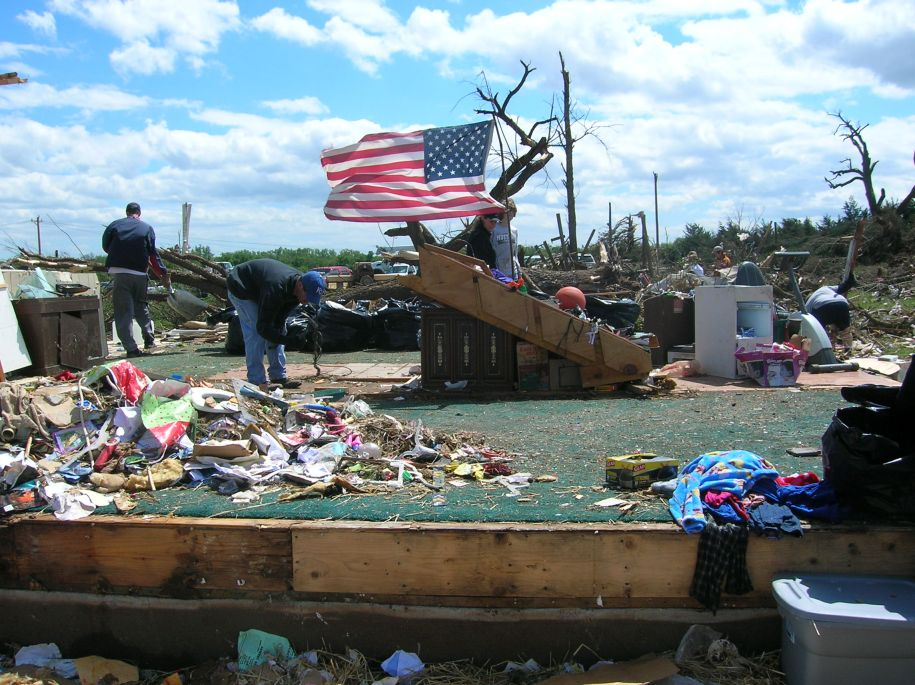
EF4 damage to a farmhouse in Ellsworth County, Kansas.

Later that evening, a cyclic supercell thunderstorm developed in northern Oklahoma before moving into southern Kansas, producing multiple tornadoes along the way. This included a large EF3 wedge tornado that destroyed homes near Conway Springs. As this supercell moved into Wichita around 10:15 pm CDT (0315 UTC), another large EF3 wedge tornado touched down and caused major damage in the southeastern part of the city. Staff at the Wichita National Weather Service Weather Forecast Office at Wichita Mid-Continent Airport were forced to hand over responsibility for their County Warning Area to the National Weather Service offices in Topeka and take shelter at about 10:00 pm CDT (0300 UTC), returning to duty half an hour later. Another supercell thunderstorm also produced two EF3 wedge tornadoes that passed near Fellsburg and Hudson, causing significant damage.

Around 10:00 p.m. CDT (0300 UTC), a broken squall line began to form across the eastern portions of the Texas and Oklahoma panhandles; a thunderstorm developed ahead of the northern line segment in northwestern Wheeler County, Texas, at approximately 10:30 p.m. CDT (0330 UTC), and began developing supercell characteristics as it tracked northeastward into the Oklahoma counties of Ellis and Roger Mills. A tornado warning was issued for Ellis, Harper and Woodward counties at 12:00 am CDT (0500 UTC) on April 15 after weather spotters reported a tornado spawned by this supercell located 7 miles (11 km) southeast of Gage in Ellis County. This high-end EF3 tornado later struck Woodward, Oklahoma, at 12:20 am CDT (0520 UTC), killing six people. Multiple homes and businesses were destroyed in Woodward, and all fatalities occurred as a result of destroyed mobile homes. Additional weak tornadoes occurred on April 15 and 16 before the outbreak came to an end. A total of 113 tornadoes were confirmed as a result of this outbreak.

== May ==
=== May 6 (Japan) ===
| FU | F0 | F1 | F2 | F3 | F4 | F5 |
|---|---|---|---|---|---|---|
| 0 | 0 | 1 | 0 | 1 | 0 | 0 |

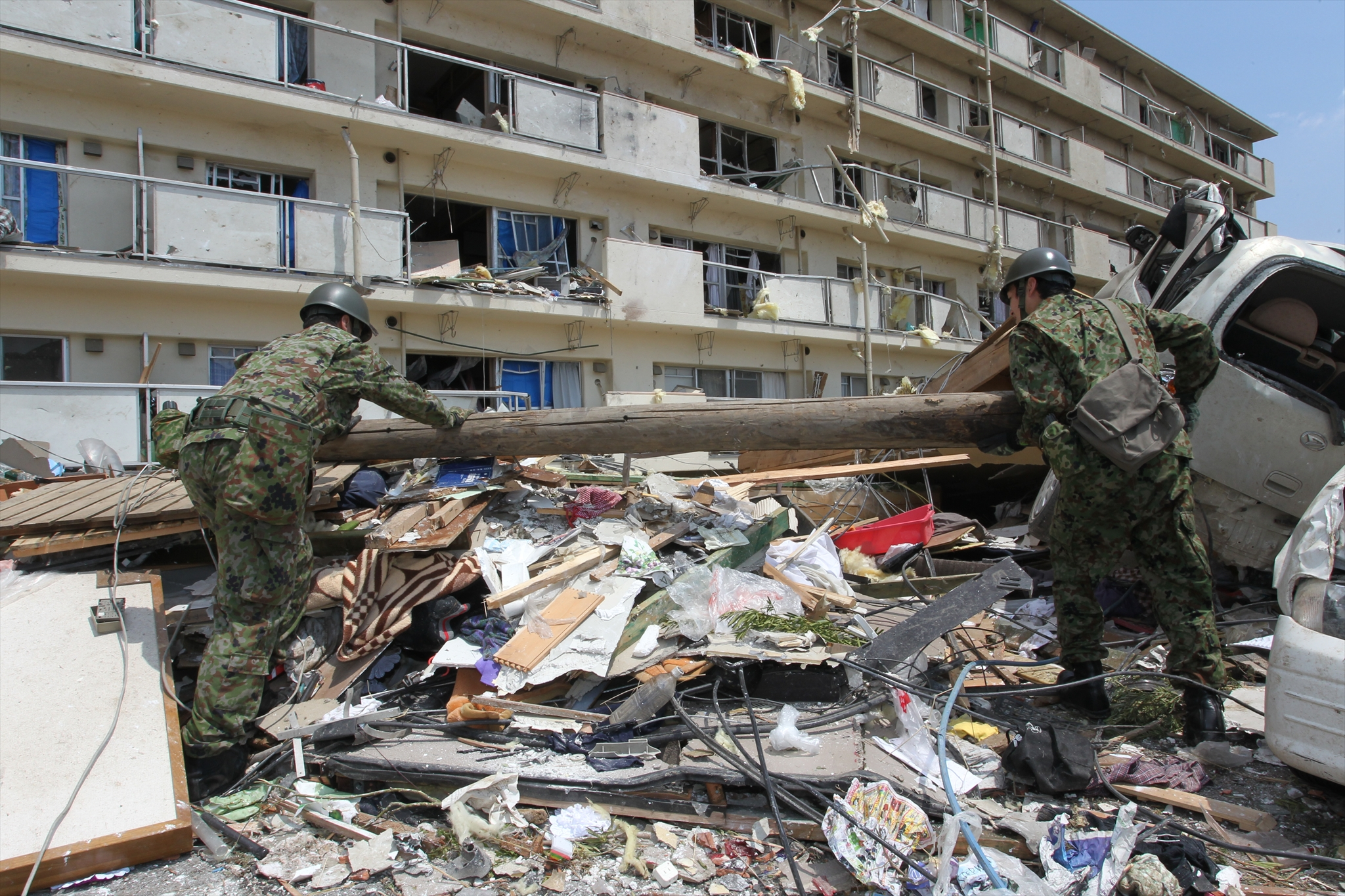
Damage to an apartment building following the F3 Tsukuba, Japan tornado.

On May 6, a powerful and destructive high-end F3 tornado tracked through the town of Tsukuba, Ibaraki roughly 40 mi (64 km) away from Tokyo, Japan, killing one person and injuring thirty-seven others. Many homes were damaged or destroyed by the tornado, including a few that were leveled or swept clean from their foundations. One house was rolled onto its roof and collapsed, pulling its entire concrete slab foundation out of the ground in the process. Homes that remained intact sustained loss of roofs and exterior walls, and were shredded by flying debris. Metal warehouse buildings sustained severe damage as the tornado impacted industrial areas of town, and a large 5-story apartment building sustained major damage to its exterior and interior. Trees were snapped and debarked, power poles were downed, and many vehicles were tossed, piled atop each other, and destroyed. Large amounts of sheet metal roofing was scattered throughout the damage path, much of which was wrapped around power lines. Masonry fences were toppled over, and a gas station canopy was destroyed as well. The tornado destroyed 76 houses and left a damage path roughly 17 km long. The Tsukuba tornado was clearly visible on radar while it was on the ground, with a hook echo and mesocyclone evident. A second tornado, rated F1, struck Moka, Tochigi and injured one person as well.

=== May 19 (Kansas) ===
| EFU | EF0 | EF1 | EF2 | EF3 | EF4 | EF5 |
|---|---|---|---|---|---|---|
| 0 | 7 | 1 | 0 | 2 | 0 | 0 |

On May 19, a localized outbreak of tornadoes occurred in south-central Kansas, to the west of Wichita. Two of these tornadoes were strong, both reaching EF3 intensity. One of these EF3 tornadoes severely damaged two farmsteads just northwest of Harper, Kansas, mangled vehicles and farm machinery, and partially debarked trees. The other EF3 occurred near Duquoin and badly damaged or destroyed several wind turbines. A wind speed measurement device attached to a 300 foot tall crane that was struck by this tornado recorded a 166 mph wind gust before the crane collapsed. Other weaker tornadoes touched down just to the north in the Spivey and Kingman areas. Further to the south in Florida, a brief EF0 tornado touched down in St. Petersburg and ripped part of the roof off of a motel. A total of 10 tornadoes were confirmed. Notably, most of these tornadoes developed from non-supercell processes.

=== May 25 (Kansas) ===
| EFU | EF0 | EF1 | EF2 | EF3 | EF4 | EF5 |
|---|---|---|---|---|---|---|
| 0 | 5 | 4 | 4 | 0 | 0 | 0 |

On the evening of May 25, a small outbreak of tornadoes impacted central Kansas, including a few strong tornadoes. A large EF2 was documented by numerous storm chasers as it passed near the town of La Crosse, causing significant damage to farmsteads, outbuildings, and trees. This tornado spawned two satellite tornadoes as well, including an EF1 that struck La Crosse directly, resulting in minor to moderate damage in town. The second satellite tornado was an EF2 that caused extensive tree damage. Just south of Russell, an EF2 tornado struck a subdivision and damaged several manufactured homes, completely destroying one of them. Another EF2 tornado caused significant damage to vegetation and power lines near Bison. A total of 13 tornadoes were confirmed.

== June ==
=== June 1 (Colombia) ===
A tornado struck Sabanalarga, Colombia. One person was killed and 107 were injured.

=== June 4 (United States) ===
| EFU | EF0 | EF1 | EF2 | EF3 | EF4 | EF5 |
|---|---|---|---|---|---|---|
| 0 | 2 | 0 | 1 | 0 | 0 | 0 |

An isolated, rain-wrapped EF2 tornado touched down in Diehlstadt, Missouri, late on June 4. It was only on the ground very briefly, but hit a mobile home while down, completely destroying the structure and killing three occupants. Trees and some warehouse buildings were also damaged, It was the first killer US tornado since the April 14 outbreak. The tornado was embedded in a larger area of microburst. A brief landspout tornado also touched down in Arkansas and was rated an EF0. Another brief EF0 tornado touched down in Texas. Neither of these weak tornadoes produced any damage.

=== June 7 (Australia) ===
A damaging high-end F1 tornado tore through the northern suburbs of Dianella and Morley in Perth, Western Australia at about midday. Multiple homes sustained considerable roof damage, trees were downed, and a video store was badly damaged. Winds associated with the tornado were estimated at 180 km/h (110 mph).

=== June 12 (Europe) ===
| FU | F0 | F1 | F2 | F3 | F4 | F5 |
|---|---|---|---|---|---|---|
| 4 | 1 | 3 | 1 | 0 | 0 | 0 |

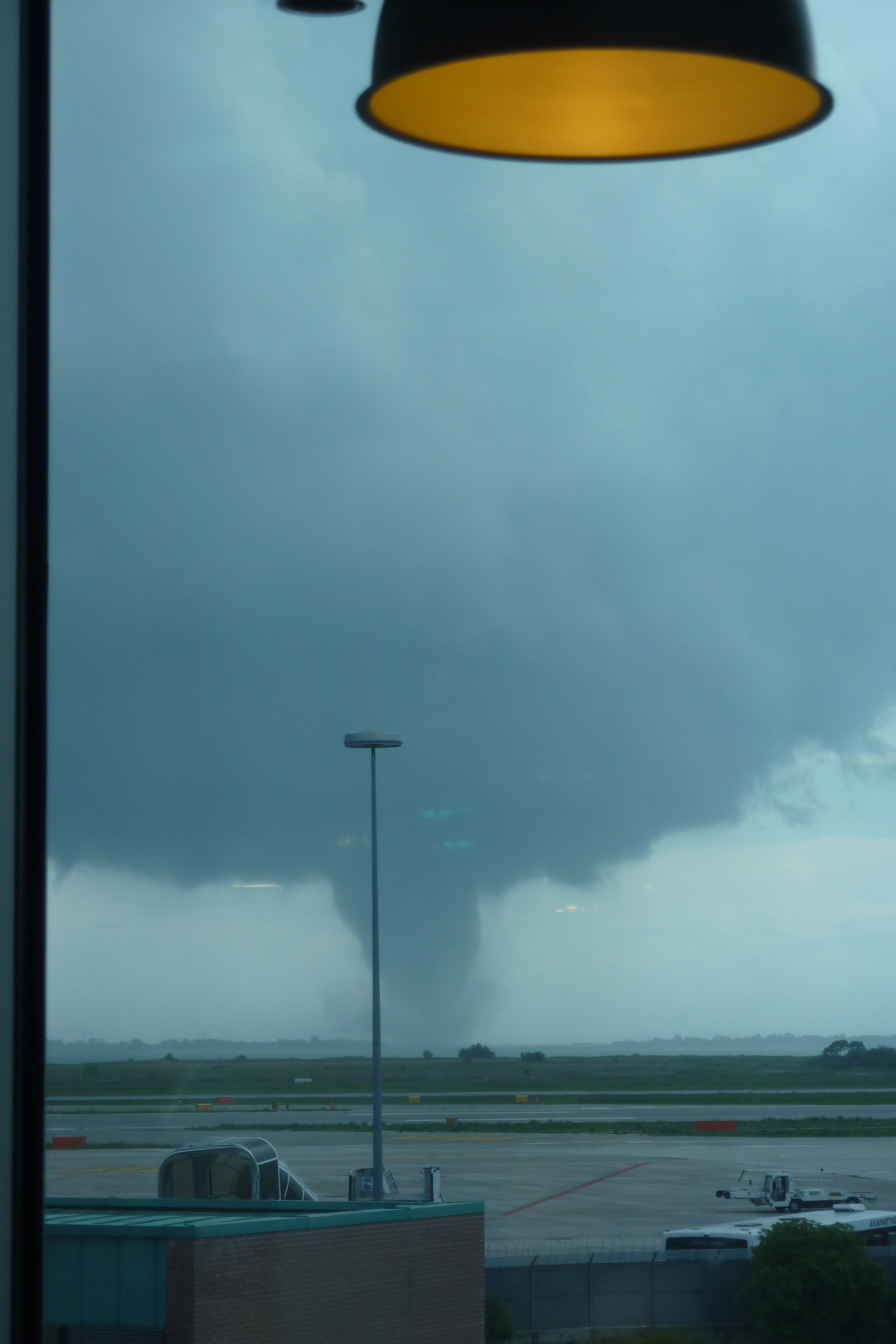
The F1 Venice tornado seen from a window of the Venice Marco Polo Airport.

A small outbreak of mostly weak tornadoes affected Europe on June 12. In Italy, a large stovepipe tornado was photographed and caught on video as it impacted the eastern fringes of Venice (Veneto, North-East Italy), notably the isles of Sant'Elena, Saint Erasmus and Lido, and the nearby town of Treporti. No casualties were reported, though considerable damage occurred, with many trees snapped and some small industrial buildings and outbuildings damaged or destroyed. Multiple sailboats were thrown and damaged, cars had windows shattered, greenhouses were destroyed, and several homes sustained considerable roof damage as well. The tornado was officially rated high-end F1, though some sources list it as an F2. A brief, weak tornado of unknown intensity also touched down near Torre di Fine, causing no damage. In Russia, several tornadoes also occurred, the most significant of which was an F2 that flattened a large swath of trees in a forest near Ryabeyevo in Tver Oblast. Two other tornadoes, rated F0 and F1, both caused minor damage near Khanty-Mansiysk as well. In Ukraine, a tornado of unknown intensity struck the Krylos area, downing many trees and power poles. 40 homes were also damaged along the path, some significantly. In Germany, an F1 tornado was confirmed near Ovenhausen in North Rhine-Westphalia, while a tornado of unknown intensity also touched down near Witten. A brief, weak tornado was also caught on video in Ireland, as it touched down in an open field near Enfield. In all, nine tornadoes were confirmed.

=== June 23–26 (Tropical Storm Debby) ===
| EFU | EF0 | EF1 | EF2 | EF3 | EF4 | EF5 |
|---|---|---|---|---|---|---|
| 0 | 19 | 5 | 1 | 0 | 0 | 0 |

Several tornadoes were spawned from the outer bands of Tropical Storm Debby in the Florida peninsula. On the afternoon of June 23, at least one tornado touched down in Naples, Florida, with significant damage reported. Further tornadoes touched down starting in the morning of June 24 and continuing through the day across several regions of Florida. One person was killed in Venus from an EF0 tornado there that damaged numerous houses. At least 18 tornadoes were confirmed over the two-day period in Florida. The 10 tornadoes (all EF0) in South Florida was the region's largest tornado outbreak in over 50 years.

== July ==
=== July 14 (Poland) ===
| FU | F0 | F1 | F2 | F3 | F4 | F5 |
|---|---|---|---|---|---|---|
| 0 | 0 | 1 | 0 | 2 | 0 | 0 |

Three tornadoes impacted the Pomerania region of Poland on July 14, two of which were strong and caused significant damage. The first was a large F3 stovepipe tornado that struck Barlewiczki, heavily damaging or destroying homes, barns, and businesses, downing many trees and power poles, tossing farm implements, and injuring several people before dissipating. A total of 22 buildings were damaged or destroyed by the Barlewiczki tornado, which was caught on video and photographed by numerous local residents. A second, this time a multi-vortex F3 tornado impacted the Wycinki area, completely flattening a massive swath of trees in the Bory Tucholskie National Park and damaging or destroying multiple homes. A 60-year-old man was killed in the complete destruction of his summer home near Wycinki, and multiple other people were injured along the path. This included a family of three that sustained injuries after a large tree crushed their home. In the latter stages, the tornado shrunk in size into a classic cone, eventually sidewinding before dissipation. The final tornado was an F1 that caused roof damage in Bagienica.

=== July 21 (China) ===
A strong EF3 tornado touched down in the southeastern fringes of Beijing on July 21. Multiple buildings were impacted by the tornado, some of which sustained major structural damage. A factory sustained roof loss and collapse of several brick exterior walls, while a nearby factory building was leveled. Other factories and structures sustained partial to total roof loss, and several motorcycles and a mini-van were thrown. Outbuildings, greenhouses, and storage structures were also destroyed, and a bicycle shed had its supporting pillars pulled out of the ground. Many trees were snapped or uprooted along the path, some of which were denuded and debarked. A few homes had their roofs torn off, and metal electrical pylons and masonry fences were toppled over as well. Two people were killed by the tornado, and several others were injured.

=== July 30 (Philippines) ===
A tornado struck Silay, Negros Occidental at around 19:30 PhST where it destroyed a house and damaged 23 others. It also swept two school in the town where it destroyed multiple classrooms, a canteen, and a stage. One of those schools were almost completely destroyed. A person was killed after being hit by a falling tree. Fifteen minutes later, the tornado went through the nearby town of Enrique B. Magalona where it destroyed four houses and damaged 130 others. It also struck a school where it completely destroyed three classrooms and damaged 5 others. A 14-year-old was injured after being hit by flying debris.

== August ==
=== August 26 (Australia) ===
Two short-lived tornadoes touched down in the suburbs of Adelaide, South Australia. The tornadoes brought extensive damage to homes, trees and powerlines.

=== August 27 – September 4 (Hurricane Isaac) ===
| EFU | EF0 | EF1 | EF2 | EF3 | EF4 | EF5 |
|---|---|---|---|---|---|---|
| 0 | 26 | 6 | 2 | 0 | 0 | 0 |

On August 27, a rain band from Hurricane Isaac produced a brief EF0 tornado near Vero Beach, Florida, that damaged about 100 structures. Two days later, on August 29, several weak tornadoes touched down across Alabama, Florida, and Mississippi in association with the landfall of Isaac. This continued through September 1 as Isaac's remnants moved northward into the Midwest. Alabama, Mississippi, Arkansas, Missouri, Illinois, Indiana, Delaware, and New Jersey all recorded several, mostly weak, tornadoes until the remnants of Isaac moved away from the United States.

== September ==
=== September 8 (United States and Canada) ===
| EFU | EF0 | EF1 | EF2 | EF3 | EF4 | EF5 |
|---|---|---|---|---|---|---|
| 0 | 2 | 1 | 1 | 0 | 0 | 0 |

Just after midnight on the morning of September 8, a weak EF0 tornado touched down near Newtonsville, Ohio, and caused minor roof damage to a few homes. The same day, late in the 10:00 am (EDT) hour, a waterspout formed just off the coast of Queens and moved onshore near Breezy Point. Once onshore, the storm caused structural damage and downed power lines. Damage continued into the Canarsie, Brooklyn area before the tornado dissipated. This section of the tornado received a rating of EF0. it then moved back over water and then back on shore as a stronger tornado in the Canarsie section of Brooklyn and was given a high-end EF1 rating. Further west in New Jersey, 20,000 customers lost power.

The storms were associated with a vigorous low pressure system that spawned severe weather across New England, Pennsylvania, New York as well as across the Canada–US border into southern Ontario and Quebec. An F0 tornado was also confirmed damaging a 5-story building and nearby businesses in downtown Drummondville, Quebec. as well as an F2 east of Napanee, Ontario, which destroyed a trailer and a shed. The trailer rolled for about 30 meters.

== October ==
=== October 17–19 (United States) ===
| EFU | EF0 | EF1 | EF2 | EF3 | EF4 | EF5 |
|---|---|---|---|---|---|---|
| 0 | 2 | 10 | 2 | 1 | 0 | 0 |

During the evening hours of October 17, a fast-moving and powerful low-pressure system brought severe weather, including a small but damaging outbreak of tornadoes, to portions of the Southern United States and Eastern United States. In Arkansas, an EF1 tornado caused moderate damage to homes and businesses in the town of Clarendon. Farther east, an EF2 tornado tracked through areas near Shelby, Mississippi, downing a radio tower and destroying a mobile home, along with several outbuildings. Three separate tornadoes also touched down near the town of Louise, with two EF1 tornadoes that damaged roofs, outbuildings, and trees in the area, while an EF2 damaged or destroyed several mobile homes and snapped many power poles, injuring four. Tornado activity continued into the early morning hours of October 18, including an EF3 that passed near Forest, Mississippi, downing countless trees, destroying mobile homes and outbuildings, and bending three large metal high-tension poles to the ground. This tornado injured one person, and is one of only two EF3 tornadoes to ever be recorded in the state of Mississippi during the month of October. Two other tornadoes, rated EF0 and EF1, were confirmed by the National Weather Service in Little Rock, Arkansas. As the system moved eastward on October 19, two additional tornadoes, EF0 and EF1, touched down in Pennsylvania and Maryland. Several structures were damaged and 15 people were injured in the Pennsylvania tornado when a pavilion near Paradise collapsed. A total of 15 tornadoes were confirmed.

=== October 25 (Philippines) ===
| EFU | EF0 | EF1 | EF2 | EF3 | EF4 | EF5 |
|---|---|---|---|---|---|---|
| 5 | 0 | 0 | 0 | 0 | 0 | 0 |

During Typhoon Son-Tinh (Ofel) five tornadoes were reported across Quezon. In infanta, a tornado destroyed at least 15 houses and a child was injured after they were hit by a fallen tree. In Panukulan, around 29 houses were damaged by another tornado. Meanwhile four houses were damaged in Lucena and three houses were damaged in General Nakar after being hit by tornadoes. In Tiaong, another tornado damaged 2 houses.

=== October 31 (Canada) ===
A weak F0 tornado touched down near the town of Mont-Laurier, Quebec. A barn was destroyed and road signs were blown down by the tornado. Although not notable, it was the final tornado to be rated on the Fujita scale in Canada, as the Enhanced Fujita Scale was adopted by Environment Canada in April 2013.

== November ==
=== November 16–17 (Europe) ===
| FU | F0 | F1 | F2 | F3 | F4 | F5 |
|---|---|---|---|---|---|---|
| 0 | 2 | 0 | 0 | 1 | 0 | 0 |

On November 16, a warm and unstable air mass associated with a depression combined with favorable wind shear, brought an unusually favorable setup for severe weather and tornadoes to Portugal. Later that day, a strong semi-discrete supercell thunderstorm embedded within a Mesoscale Convective System developed, and produced a strong, long-tracked F3 wedge tornado that moved through Carvoeiro, Lagoa and Silves, Portugal, killing one person and injuring 13 others. Multiple concrete-frame apartment buildings and homes had heavy exterior damage, shattered windows, and roofs torn off, while numerous vehicles were thrown and severely damaged. Many large trees were snapped and denuded along the path of the tornado, a few of which sustained debarking. A metal truss high-tension tower was blown over, and a soccer stadium was heavily damaged, with multiple large masonry walls collapsed. Some industrial buildings were also damaged, power poles were snapped, and metal light poles were bent to the ground as well. The following day, two brief F0 tornadoes touched down in Spain as a result of the same storm system, resulting in only minor damage.

=== November 27–29 (Europe) ===
| FU | F0 | F1 | F2 | F3 | F4 | F5 |
|---|---|---|---|---|---|---|
| 0 | 0 | 5 | 1 | 1 | 0 | 0 |

A small, but damaging three-day outbreak of tornadoes that affected the Mediterranean region of Europe began in Italy on November 27, with an F1 tornado that moved through Rosignano Marittimo. Multiple homes in residential areas sustained heavy roof damage, windows were broken, trees were downed, while fencing and sheds were destroyed. On November 28, a large, multiple-vortex, F3 wedge tornado caused major damage in an industrial section of Taranto. Multiple industrial buildings at the Ilva steel plant were severely damaged, a large reinforced concrete chimney was completely destroyed, and a massive multi-ton crane was lifted and toppled at this location. Multiple vehicles were tossed into piles and damaged, and some were thrown considerable distances and severely mangled. Metal power pylons were blown to the ground, while a gas station and several other structures were also damaged. One person was killed by the Taranto tornado, and 40 others were injured. An F1 tornado from the same parent supercell struck the Monopoli area the same day, causing roof, window, and tree damage. The outbreak continued eastward on November 29, with multiple tornadoes causing damage in Greece. Near Preveza, an F1 tornado snapped many trees, damaged some farms, and destroyed signs and greenhouses along its path. Another F1 destroyed a warehouse, an open-air canteen, and a garage in the Argassi area. The strongest tornado to occur that day was an F2 that touched down near Katakolo and uprooted hundreds of olive trees, and also destroyed the roofs of several structures, along with some metal shelter buildings. An F1 tornado also downed many trees near Alfeiousa before the outbreak came to an end. A total of seven tornadoes were confirmed.

== December ==
=== December 6 (New Zealand) ===
A rain-wrapped EF2 tornado killed three people and injured seven others in the Auckland, New Zealand suburb of Hobsonville. The tornado moved through several neighborhoods and a construction site, with the three fatalities occurring at the construction site when several large concrete slabs fell and crushed a vehicle. 150 homes were damaged, a few of which had large portions of their roofs torn off. Numerous trees were snapped or uprooted along the path, and fencing was destroyed. This tornado is tied with the 1948 Hamilton tornado as the deadliest on record in New Zealand.

=== December 25–26 (United States) ===
| EFU | EF0 | EF1 | EF2 | EF3 | EF4 | EF5 |
|---|---|---|---|---|---|---|
| 0 | 10 | 11 | 8 | 2 | 0 | 0 |

A moderate risk of severe weather was issued for much of the Gulf Coast region as an intensifying area of low pressure tracked across the region starting on December 25. It was extended to December 26 as well over parts of the Carolinas. Several tornadoes were reported on December 25, especially across Louisiana and Mississippi. At 5:00 pm CST (2300 UTC), a tornado emergency was issued for Downtown Mobile, Alabama, as a large EF2 tornado was approaching the downtown area.

== See also ==
- Tornado
  - Tornadoes by year
  - Tornado records
  - Tornado climatology
  - Tornado myths
- List of tornado outbreaks
  - List of F5 and EF5 tornadoes
  - List of F4 and EF4 tornadoes
  - List of North American tornadoes and tornado outbreaks
  - List of 21st-century Canadian tornadoes and tornado outbreaks
  - List of European tornadoes and tornado outbreaks
  - List of tornadoes and tornado outbreaks in Asia
  - List of Southern Hemisphere tornadoes and tornado outbreaks
  - List of tornadoes striking downtown areas
  - List of tornadoes with confirmed satellite tornadoes
- Tornado intensity
  - Fujita scale
  - Enhanced Fujita scale
  - International Fujita scale
  - TORRO scale
